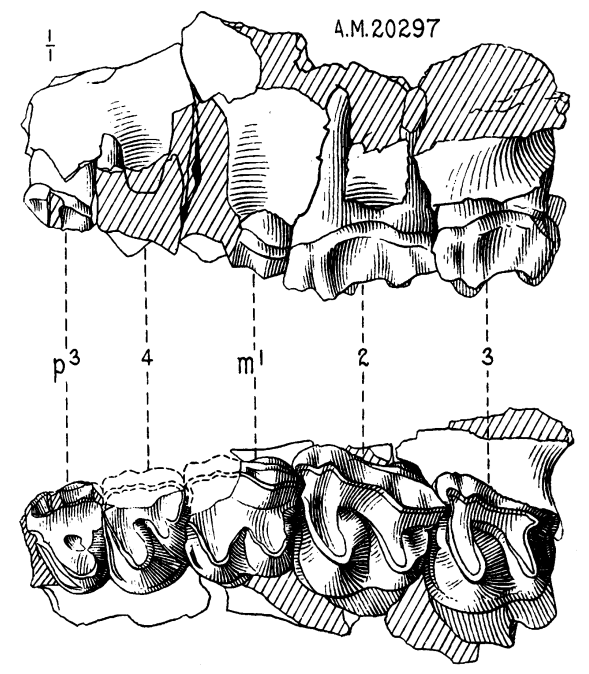
- Type specimen of C. promissus (AMNH 20297), a fragmentary jaw

Scientific classification
- Kingdom: Animalia
- Phylum: Chordata
- Class: Mammalia
- Order: Perissodactyla
- Superfamily: Rhinocerotoidea
- Family: †Amynodontidae
- Genus: †Caenolophus; Matthew & Granger, 1925

Type species
- †Caenolophus promissus Matthew & Granger, 1925

Other species
- †C. obliquus Matthew & Granger, 1925; †C. magnus Shi, 1989; †C. makii? Takai, 1939; †C. minimus (Note: This Caenolophus minimus is the species originally described as Euryodon minimus by Xu et al. in 1979. Despite the identical name, it is not the same taxon as the species described as Caenolophus minimus by Matthew & Granger in 1925, which was transferred to the genus Rhodopagus in 1965.) Xu et al, 1979; †C. medius Zhou, 1957; †C. suprametalophus Shi, 1989

Synonyms
- Genus synonymy: Euryodon Xu et al., 1979; Synonyms of C. minimus: Euryodon minimus Xu et al., 1979

= Caenolophus =

Caenolophus Temporal range: Middle–Late Eocene (Irdinmanhan–Sharamurunian), 47.8–39.9 Ma

Extinct genus of mammals

Caenolophus is an extinct genus of primitive amynodont that lived in East Asia during the Middle to Late Eocene. Although Caenolophus is known only from jaw fragments, it is believed to have been anatomically intermediate between more derived amynodonts and primitive rhinocerotoids. Several species of Caenolophus have been named, with fossils found in both northern and southern China, and in North Korea.

== Research history ==
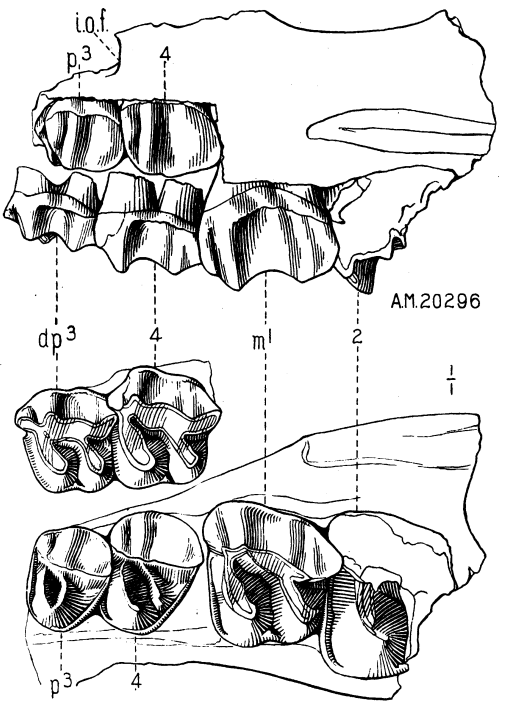
Type specimen of C. obliquus (AMNH 20296), another fragmentary jaw

Caenolophus was described by William Diller Matthew and Walter W. Granger in 1925. Matthew and Granger described four species of Caenolophus, all recovered from the Late Eocene Shara Murun Formation of Inner Mongolia, China: C. promissus, C. obliquus, C. progressus, and C. minimus. C. promissus was apparently the basis of the diagnosis of the genus, and was named first within the paper itself, but was not explicitly designated as the type species. Matthew and Granger corrected this mistake in 1926, when they formally designated C. promissus as the type species.

Matthew and Granger compared Caenolophus chiefly to the genus Prothyracodon, finding Caenolophus to be distinguishable by features of the premolars. All four species were based on fragmentary jaw material, and were given only brief descriptions. Later in 1925, Matthew and Granger described a fifth species, C. proficiens, based on a lower jaw from the earlier Irdin Manha Formation, also in Inner Mongolia. Matthew and Granger noted that the teeth of C. proficiens were "hardly distinguishable" from those of C. obliquus. In 1934, Horace Elmer Wood suggested that C. obliquus may be generically distinct from C. promissus, and opinioned that other species may also require separation into distinct genera.

In 1939, Fuyuji Takai described the new Late Eocene species of Caenolophus makii from Hwanghae Province in Korea (present-day North Hwanghae Province, North Korea), based on fossil teeth. The identification of these teeth have since been doubted, and they are probably indistinguishable from teeth referred by Takai to the separate species Rhinoceros (Aceratherium?) makii. In 1957, Zhou Mingzhen described the new species Caenolophus medius, based on a partial maxilla from the Late Eocene of Lunan, Yunnan. Zhou compared C. medius to C. obliquus, and distinguished the two mainly by the slightly smaller size of C. medius. In 1989, Shi Ronglin named two new species of Caenolophus, Caenolophus suprametalophus and Caenolophus magnus, based on fragmentary jaws from the Late Eocene of Huangzhuang, Qufu, Shandong.

In 1965, Leonard Radinsky transferred C. minimus to the genus Rhodopagus. In 1967, Radinsky further concluded that C. progressus and C. proficiens were not congeneric with C. promissus, and referred both to the genus Triplopus. In 1991, Demberelyin Dashzeveg misinterpreted Radinsky's conclusions as proposing that the entire genus Caenolophus was a synonym of Triplopus; Radinsky maintained C. promissus and C. obliquus in Caenolophus, which he classified as an amynodont.

== Description ==
Caenolophus was a relatively small rhinocerotoid. The largest species was C. magnus, with an estimated body mass of 156 kilograms (344 lb), followed closely by C. obliquus at 141 kilograms (311 lb), and C. suprametalophus at 127 kilograms (280 lb).

The teeth of Caenolophus were recognizably rhinocerotoid, though relatively primitive. The third upper molar had a quadratic outline, a characteristic feature of amynodonts, not seen in any other rhinocerotoid group.

== Classification ==
Matthew and Granger classified Caenolophus as a hyracodont (Hyracodontidae), probably due to the relatively small size of the fossils and shared primitive dental features. Caenolophus continued to be treated as a hyracodont until a revision by Radinsky in 1967. Radinsky identified C. promissus and C. obliquus as amynodonts (Amynodontidae), based on the characteristic quadratic shape of their third molars, a long second molar, and the metaloph (one of the ridges of the tooth) of the fourth premolar being posteriolingually (backwards and towards the tongue) directed.

In 1986, William P. Wall and Earl Manning proposed that the genus Teilhardia was a synonym of Caenolophus. Wall and Manning were also unsure of the correct phylogenetic position of Caenolophus, believing it to be "anatomically intermediate between amynodontids and more primitive ceratomorphs such as Hyrachyus", and in need of more complete fossil material. Later researchers have generally maintained Teilhardia as a distinct genus. Wall and Manning also designated the genus Euryodon as a synonym of Caenolophus, finding its fragmentary fossils "essentially indistinguishable from Caenolophus". Euryodon and its single species, E. minimus, were described by Xu et al. in 1979, from the Middle Eocene Dacangfang Formation in Henan, China. Although Euryodon has sometimes continued to be listed as a distinct genus, later authors tend to treat it as a synonym of Caenolophus.

Modern researchers treat Caenolophus as an amynodont and phylogenetic analyses have recover the genus inside Amynodontidae, as a very basal member (often the basalmost) of the group. The cladogram below shows Rhinocerotoidea per Lu et al. (2026):

- Rhinocerotoidea
  - - Indolophus
    - - Fouchia
      - Breviodon acares
  - - - Minchenoletes erlianensis
      - - Yimengia
        - Triplopus cubitalus
    - - - Ephyrachyus
        - Hyrachyus modestus
      - - Uintaceras radinskyi
        - - Selanaletes scopaeus
          - - - - - Hyracodontidae
                    ⊞
                    - Allaceropinae
                      - Guangnanodon youngi
                      - Megacanodon dongxiangense
                      - Allacerops ningdongica
                      - - "Moissac materials"
                        - Allacerops turgaica
                    - - Eggysodontinae
                        - Eggysodon lingwuensis
                        - - Eggysodon gaudryi
                          - - Eggysodon osborni
                            - - "Allacerops" minor
                              - Proeggysodon qiui
                      - Hyracodontinae
                        - Hyracodon nebraskensis
                        - - - Prohyracodon orientale
                            - Ardynia
                          - - Triplopides rieli
                            - - - Epitriplopus uintensis
                                - Ilianodon lunanensis
                              - - "Hyracodon" priscidens
                                - "Prohyracodon" meridionale
                    ⊟
                  - Rhinocerotidae
                    ⊞
                    - Trigonias
                    - - Subhyracodon occidentalis
                      - - Rhinoceros unicornis
                        - Menoceras arikarense
                    ⊟
                - Teletaceras
              - - Forstercooperiidae
                  ⊞
                  - Pappaceras
                  - - Forstercooperia
                    - Gobicerops
                  ⊟
                - Paraceratheriidae
                  ⊞
                  - Juxia
                  - - Urtinotherium
                    - Paraceratherium
                  ⊟
            - Amynodontidae
              - Caenolophus promissus
              - - Rostriamynodon grangeri
                - - Sharamynodon mongoliensis
                  - - Amynodon
                    - - Paramynodon
                      - - Metamynodon
                        - Cadurcodon
