= Washakie Formation =

Geologic formation in Colorado and Wyoming, United States

- Stratigraphic range: Lutetian (Bridgerian-Uintan); ~48–42 Ma
- Type: Formation
- Sub-units: Adobe Town & Kinney Rim members

Lithology
- Primary: Sandstone

Location
- Coordinates: 41.7°N 109.0°W
- Approximate paleocoordinates: 45.6°N 95.1°W
- Region: Colorado & Wyoming
- Country: United States
- Extent: Sand Wash & Washakie Basins
- Washakie Formation (the United States) Washakie Formation (Wyoming)

The Washakie Formation is a geologic formation in northern Colorado and southern Wyoming. It preserves many mammal, bird, reptile and other fossils dating back to the Lutetian stage of the Eocene within the Paleogene period. The sediments fall in the Bridgerian and Uintan stages of the NALMA classification.

== Fossil content ==
The Washakie Formation has provided many fossil mammals, turtles and other reptiles, birds and other fossils.

The artiodactyl Heliosus apophis was described from the formation by Burger and Jolley, and the rodents Pareumys flynni, Pauromys turnbulli and Thisbemys intermedius by Korth in 2020.

=== Mammals ===
Color key: Taxon / Reclassified taxon / Taxon falsely reported as present / Dubious taxon or junior synonym / Ichnotaxon / Ootaxon / Morphotaxon	Notes; Uncertain or tentative taxa are in small text; ~~crossed out~~ taxa are discredited.

Taeniodonts
Genus	Species	Presence	Material	Notes	Images
Stylinodon	S. mirus	Lower part of the Adobe Town Member.	6 specimens.	A stylinodontid taeniodont.	

Ferae
Genus	Species	Presence	Material	Notes	Images
Carnivoraformes gen. indet.	species A	Adobe Town Member.	Tooth fragments.	A carnivoraform.	
Carnivoraformes gen. indet.	species B	Adobe Town Member.	Teeth.	A carnivoraform.	
Harpalodon	H. sylvestris	Adobe Town Member.		A carnivoraform.	
Hyaenodontidae	Hyaenodontidae gen. indet.		2 partial teeth.	A hyaenodont.	
Limnocyon	L. potens	Adobe Town Member.	Partial skeleton.	A hyaenodont.	
Limnocyon	L. verus	Adobe Town Member.		A hyaenodont.	
Lycarion	L. medius	Adobe Town Member.	Cranium, dentary and right humerus.	A carnivoraform.	
Machaeroidinae	Machaeroidinae gen. indet.		Posterior fragment of a right molar.	An oxyaenid.	
Neovulpavus	N. mccarrolli	Adobe Town Member.		A carnivoraform.	
Neovulpavus	N. washakius	Adobe Town Member.		A carnivoraform.	
Oodectes	O. proximus	Adobe Town Member.	Labial fragment of right molar.	A miacid.	
Oodectes	O. pugnax	Adobe Town Member.	Partial left dentary.	A miacid.	
Patriofelis	P. ferox	Adobe Town Member.		An oxyaenid.	
Sinopa	S. lania	Adobe Town Member.		A hyaenodont.	
Sinopa	S. major	Adobe Town Member.		A hyaenodont.	
Sinopa	S. cf. S. minor	Adobe Town Member.	"FMNH PM 56405, right m1 with broken paraconid".	A hyaenodont.	
Sinopa	S. species A	Adobe Town Member.	Left maxillary fragment.	A hyaenodont.	
Thinocyon	T. cf. T. medius	Adobe Town Member.	Teeth.	A hyaenodont.	
Thinocyon	T. velox	Adobe Town Member.		A hyaenodont.	
Tritemnodon	T. sp.		Dentary fragments, fragments of vertebra and ulna.	A hyaenodont.	
Uintacyon	U. jugulans	Adobe Town Member.	Left dentary fragment and right molar.	A miacid.	
Viverravus	V. gracilis	Adobe Town Member.	Dentaries and teeth.	A viverravid.	
Viverravus	V. minutus	Adobe Town Member.	Right dentary fragment.	A viverravid.	
Viverravus	V. sp. indet.		Right dentary fragment.	A viverravid.	

Rodents
Genus	Species	Presence	Material	Notes	Images
Mattimys	M. sp.	Lower Adobe Town Member.	"FMNH PM 56559, right dentary fragment with m1."	An ischyromyid.	
Metaparamys	M. compressidens	Middle and upper Adobe Town Member.	Skull fragment and dentaries.	An ischyromyid.	
Mysops	M. sp.	Adobe Town Member.	"FMNH PM 55377, right m1 or m2."	A cylindrodontid.	
Pareumys	P. flynni	Lower, middle and upper Adobe Town Member.	Dentaries and teeth.	A cylindrodontid.	
Pauromys	P. turnbulli	Middle Adobe Town Member.	Dentaries.	A sciuravid.	
Perasciuravus	P. mcintoshi	Lower and possibly middle Adobe Town Member.		A sciuravid.	
Protoptychus	P. hatcheri	Middle Adobe Town Member.			
Quadratomus	Q. grandis	Lower Adobe Town Member.	"FMNH PM 55166, left M1 or M2; FMNH PM 55348, associated right p4 and m1."	An ischyromyid.	
Thisbemys	T. intermedius			An ischyromyid.	
Thisbemys	T. cf. T. uintensis			An ischyromyid.	
Tillomys	T. senex	Lower and middle Adobe Town Member.	Left dentary and teeth.	A sciuravid.	
Uintaparamys	U. bridgerensis	Lower and middle Adobe Town Member.	Left and right dentaries.	An ischyromyid.	

Ungulates
Genus	Species	Presence	Material	Notes	Images
Amynodon	A. advenus	Middle unit of the Adobe Town Member.		An amynodontid.	
Dilophodon	D. minusculus	Middle unit of the Adobe Town Member.		A helaletid.	
Dolichorhinus	D. sp.	Middle unit of the Adobe Town Member.		A brontothere.	
Eobasileus	E. cornutus	Adobe Town Member.		A dinoceratan.	
Eomoropus	E. amarorum	Middle unit of the Adobe Town Member.		An eomoropid.	
Epihippus	E. gracilis	Upper unit of the Adobe Town Member.		An equid.	
cf. Forstercooperia	cf. F. minuta	Middle unit of the Adobe Town Member.		A paracerathere, now reassigned to the genus Pappaceras.	
Harpagolestes	H. immanis	Adobe Town Member.		A mesonychid.	
Harpagolestes	H. sp. indet.		Mandibular fragments.	A mesonychid.	
Helaletes	H. nanus	Kinney Rim Member.		A helaletid.	
Heliosus	H. apophis	Lower Adobe Town Member.	Dentary and associated humerus.	A helohyid.	
Hyrachyus	H. eximius	Kinney Rim Member and lower unit of the Adobe Town Member.		A rhinoceratoid.	
Hyrachyus	H. modestus	Kinney Rim Member and lower unit of the Adobe Town Member.		A rhinoceratoid.	
Isectolophus	I. latidens	Lower unit of the Adobe Town Member.		An isectolophid.	
Mesatirhinus	M. sp.	Kinney Rim Member and lower unit of the Adobe Town Member.	Over 20 partial skeletons.	A brontothere.	
Mesonychia?	Mesonychia? gen. indet.		Teeth.	A mesonychian.	
Metarhinus	M. sp.	Middle unit of the Adobe Town Member.		A brontothere.	
Orohippus	O. sp.			An equid.	
Pappaceras	P. minuta	Middle unit of the Adobe Town Member.		A paracerathere.	
Simidectes	aff. S.?		Left molar.	A mesonychian.	
Synoplotherium	S. lanius	Adobe Town Member.		A mesonychid.	
Synoplotherium	S. sp. indet.			A mesonychid.	
Telmatherium	T. sp.	Lower unit of the Adobe Town Member.		A brontothere.	
Triplopus	T. cubitalis	Middle unit of the Adobe Town Member.		A hyracodontid.	
Triplopus	T. implicatus			A hyracodontid.	
Uintatherium	U. anceps	Adobe Town Member.		A dinoceratan.	

=== Reptiles ===
Color key: Taxon / Reclassified taxon / Taxon falsely reported as present / Dubious taxon or junior synonym / Ichnotaxon / Ootaxon / Morphotaxon	Notes; Uncertain or tentative taxa are in small text; ~~crossed out~~ taxa are discredited.

Birds
Genus	Species	Presence	Material	Notes	Images
Bathornis	B. grallator	"Sand Wash Basin, Wyoming, locality 196".	Partial skeleton (CM 9377).	A bathornithid.	
Neocathartes	N. grallator	"Sand Wash Basin, Wyoming, locality 196".		Considered a junior synonym of Bathornis grallator.	

Testudines
Genus	Species	Presence	Material	Notes	Images
Anosteira	A. pulchra	Adobe Town Member (Sweetwater County, Wyoming).	FMNH PR966, a near-complete cranium.	A carettochelyid turtle.	

== See also ==
- List of fossiliferous stratigraphic units in Wyoming
- Paleontology in Wyoming
- Bridger Formation
- Green River Formation
- Uinta Formation
- Wasatch Formation
