= Armania (mammal) =

Armania Temporal range: Late Eocene (Ergilian), 37.8–33.9 Ma
- Drawing of the type fossil (PSS n°27–10) of A. asiana

Scientific classification
- Kingdom: Animalia
- Phylum: Chordata
- Class: Mammalia
- Order: Perissodactyla
- Superfamily: Rhinocerotoidea
- Genus: †Armania; Gabunia & Dashzeveg, 1988
- Species: †A. asiana

Binomial name
- †Armania asiana Gabunia & Dashzeveg, 1988

Extinct genus of mammals

Armania is an extinct genus of rhinocerotoid of disputed affinities that lived in East Asia during the Late Eocene, in the Ergilian land mammal age. A single species of Armania has been described, A. asiana, based on fragmentary skull material found in the Ergilin Dzo Formation of Mongolia. Armania has been classified in various positions within Rhinocerotoidea. Recent research generally favors Armania as either an amynodont or a hyracodont.

== Research history ==
Armania asiana is known from the Late Eocene Ergilin Dzo Formation in Mongolia. The genus and species were described by Leonide Gabunia and Demberelyin Dashzeveg in 1988, with additional descriptive and systematic work being published by Dashzeveg in 1991. The only fossils known of Armania are fragments of upper jaws and isolated teeth. The holotype, PSS n°27–10, is a fragmentary left upper jaw, preserving parts of the canine, as well as the second to fourth premolar. Gabunia and Dashzeveg also designated a paratype specimen, the fragmentary right upper jaw PSS n°27–14, which preserves the alveoli of the incisors, canine, and premolars.

The name Armania is derived from the Mongolian word for rhinoceros, arman. The species name asiana is derived from the Latin asianus ("Asian").

== Description ==
Armania was a specialized rhinocerotoid, and showcased some notable derived features. Armania had a much reduced facial region; the front edge of the orbits (eye sockets) of Armania was directly above its second upper premolars and it had a relatively shallow nasal incisions, which nevertheless reached very nearly all the way to the orbits.

Armania had hypsodont (high-crowned) teeth. The canines were well-developed, round in cross-section, and directed slightly downwards and forwards. The premolars were reduced in number, with the first pair having been lost.

== Classification ==
Dashzeveg classified Armania as a hyracodont, though did so at a time when the paraceratheres were also believed to be part of that family. He specifically classified it as an "indricotheriine hyracodontid" (i.e. what is presently understood as the family Paraceratheriidae). Dashzeveg believed Armania to be a descendant of Forstercooperia. In 1996, Dashzeveg erected a new hyracodont subfamily, "Allaceropinae", in which he included Armania, Eggysodon, Forstercooperia, Juxia, and Tenisia.

Later paleontologists have disagreed with Dashzeveg's classification of Armania, but opinions are divided over its correct position. Koenigswald, Holbrook & Rose (2011) and Lopatin (2020) classified Armania as an amynodont. Bai et al. (2020) and Tsubamoto et al. (2022) classified Armania as a hyracodont.

== Paleoecology ==
The Erlian Basin, in which the Ergilin Dzo Formation is situated, experienced a subtropical and humid climate during the Eocene. The vegetation was highly diverse and dominated by deciduous trees and shrubs. During the Ergilian, the region was undergoing a gradual transition from dense forests to more steppe-like environments that would appear in the Oligocene, but had not yet transitioned into forest steppe. The Ergilin Dzo Formation preserves a highly diverse fossil fauna; over a hundred species have been identified, out of which over 80 are mammals. Perissodactyls were a dominant group in the Ergilian, particularly amynodonts and brontotheres. Other perissodactyl groups represented included paraceratheres, hyracodonts, chalicotherioids, rhinoceroses, and tapiroids. Artiodactyls were represented by entelodonts, anthracotheres, and ruminants. Contemporary predators included a variety of groups, such as nimravids (Nimravus), hyaenodonts (Hyaenodon), and mesonychids (Mongolestes and Metahapalodectes).
