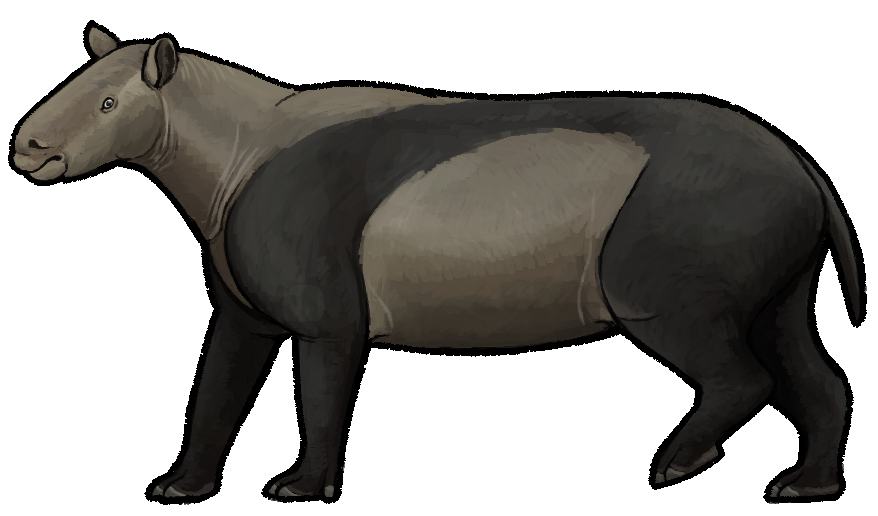
- Restoration
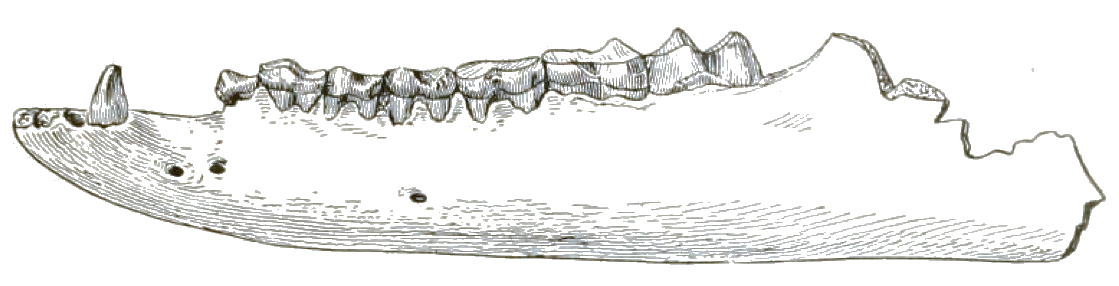
- Holotype jaw of the possible synonym Forstercooperia (Hyrachyus) grandis

Scientific classification
- Kingdom: Animalia
- Phylum: Chordata
- Class: Mammalia
- Order: Perissodactyla
- Superfamily: Rhinocerotoidea
- Genus: †Uintaceras; Holbrook & Lucas, 1997
- Species: †U. radinskyi

Binomial name
- †Uintaceras radinskyi Holbrook & Lucas, 1997

Synonyms
- Forstercooperia grandis? Radinsky, 1967; Hyrachyus grande? Peterson, 1919; Hyrachyus grandis? (Peterson, 1919)

= Uintaceras =

Uintaceras Temporal range: Middle Eocene, 46.2–40.4 Ma

Extinct genus of rhinoceros

Uintaceras is an extinct genus of medium-sized early rhinocerotoids that lived in North America (Wyoming and Utah) during the Middle Eocene, with only the type species U. radinskyi, named in 1997, currently contained within the genus. Traditionally considered the oldest and most primitive species of the Rhinocerotidae, it may instead have been a close relative of the Asian Paraceratheriidae. The dubious species Forstercooperia (Hyrachyus) grandis (Radinsky, 1967; Peterson, 1919) is also possibly the same animal as Uintaceras, although the Asian material of F. grandis was assignable to Forstercooperia confluens.

Uintaceras weighed about 220 kilograms (490 lb) when fully grown. It was a relatively slender animal and Uintaceras resembled a typical hyracodontid (e.g. Hyracodon), but differed from the hyracodonts due to the presence of a primitive four-fingered hand and a number of other features of the structure of the legs, which were clearly not intended for fast and long running.
