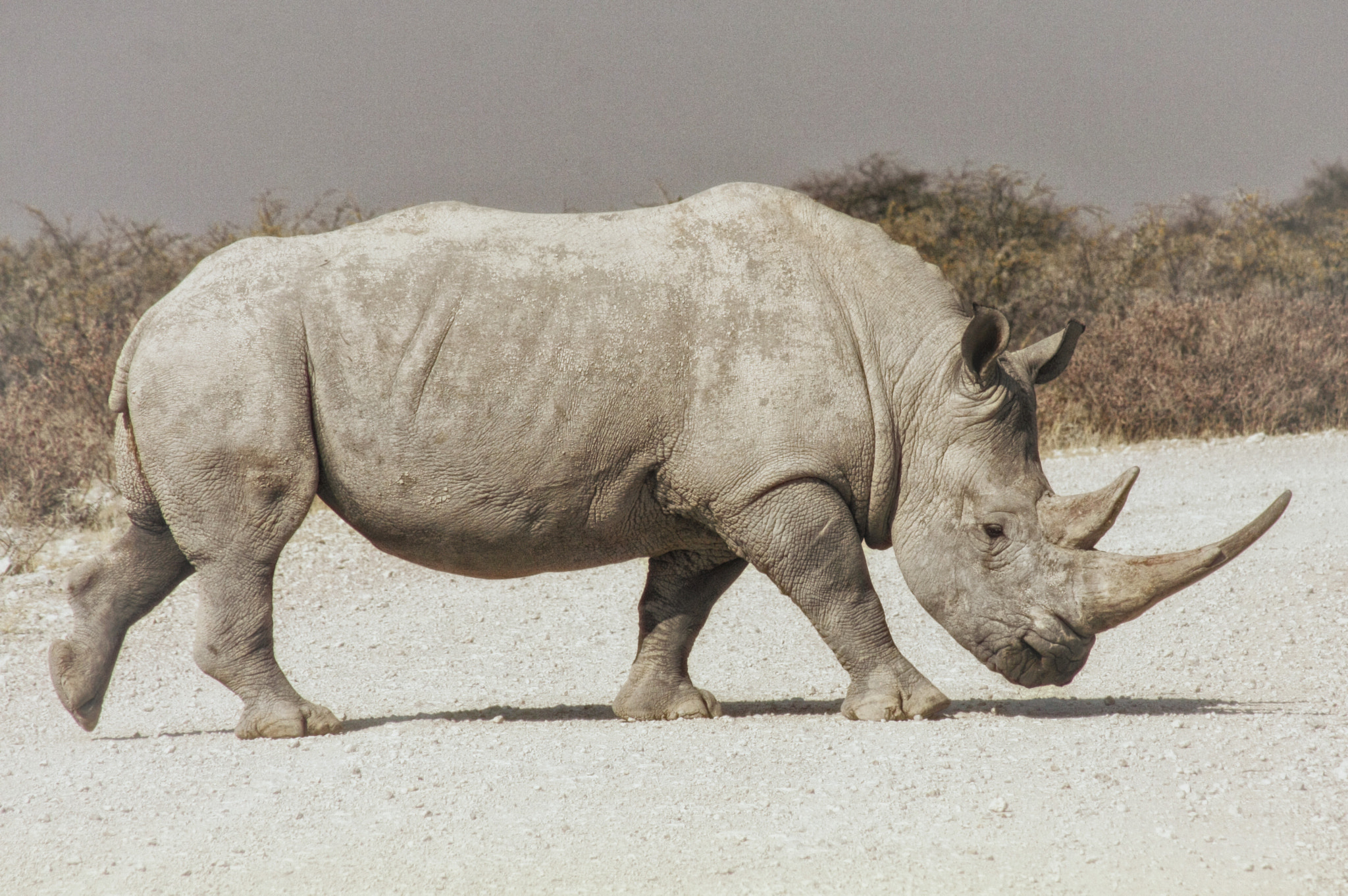
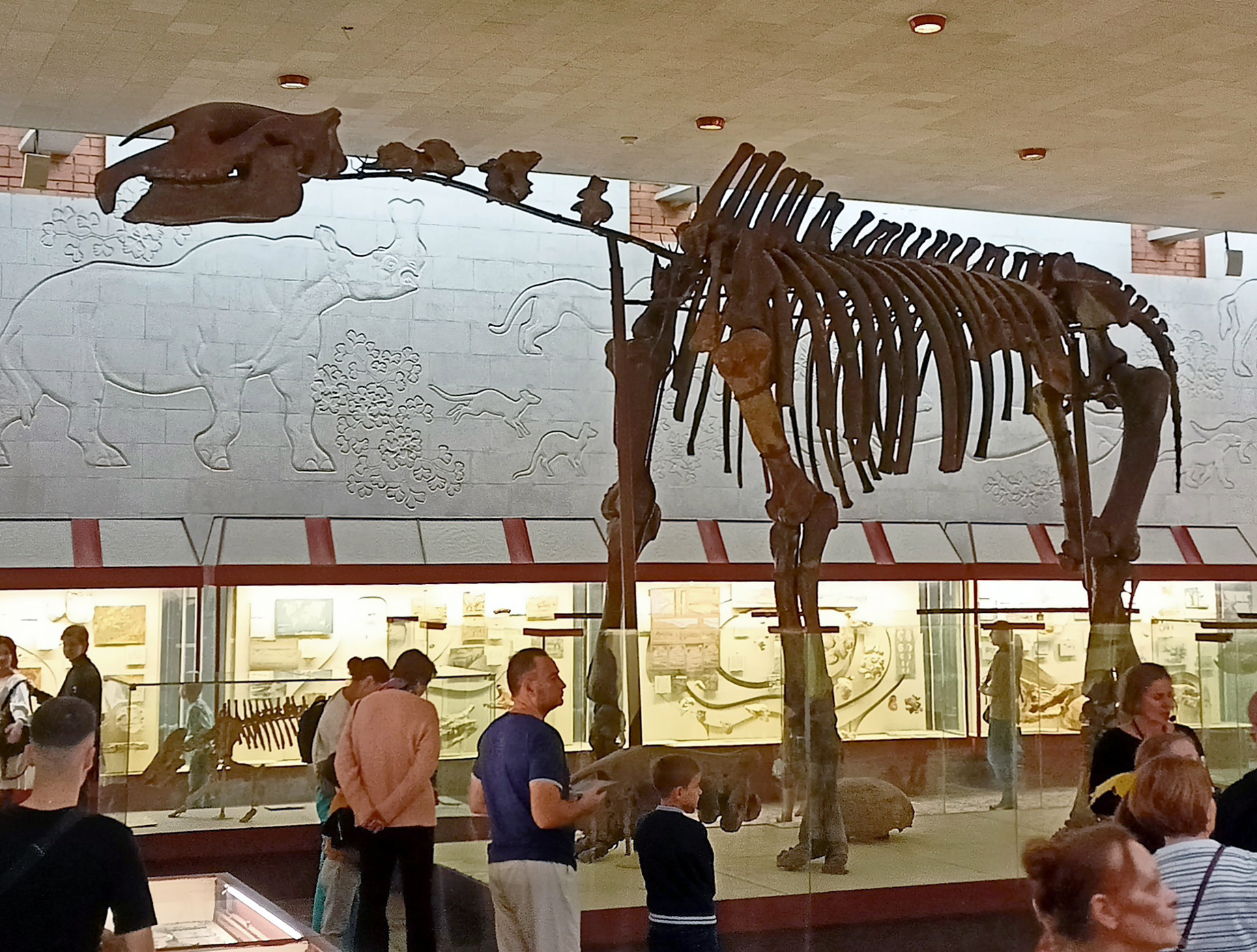
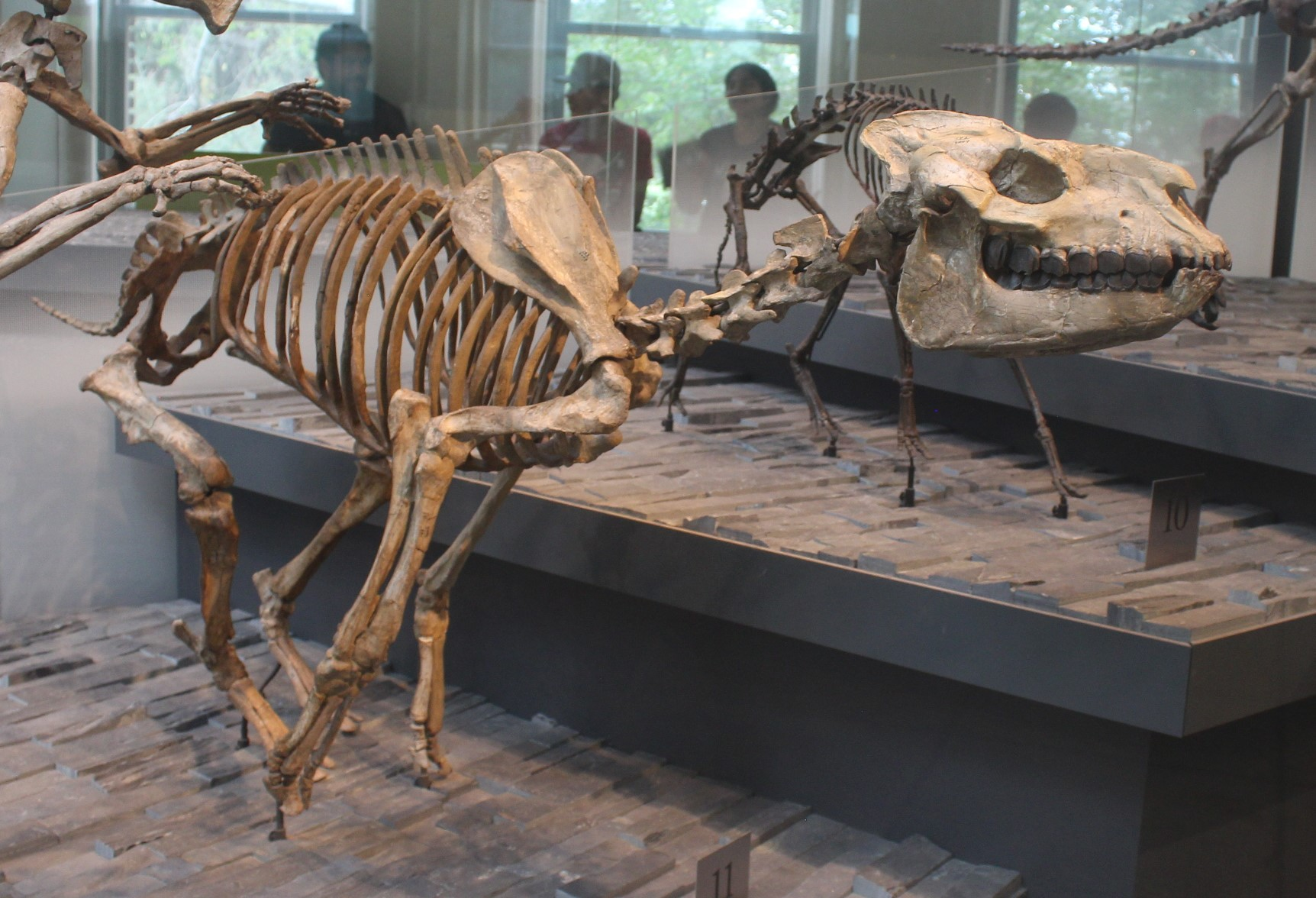
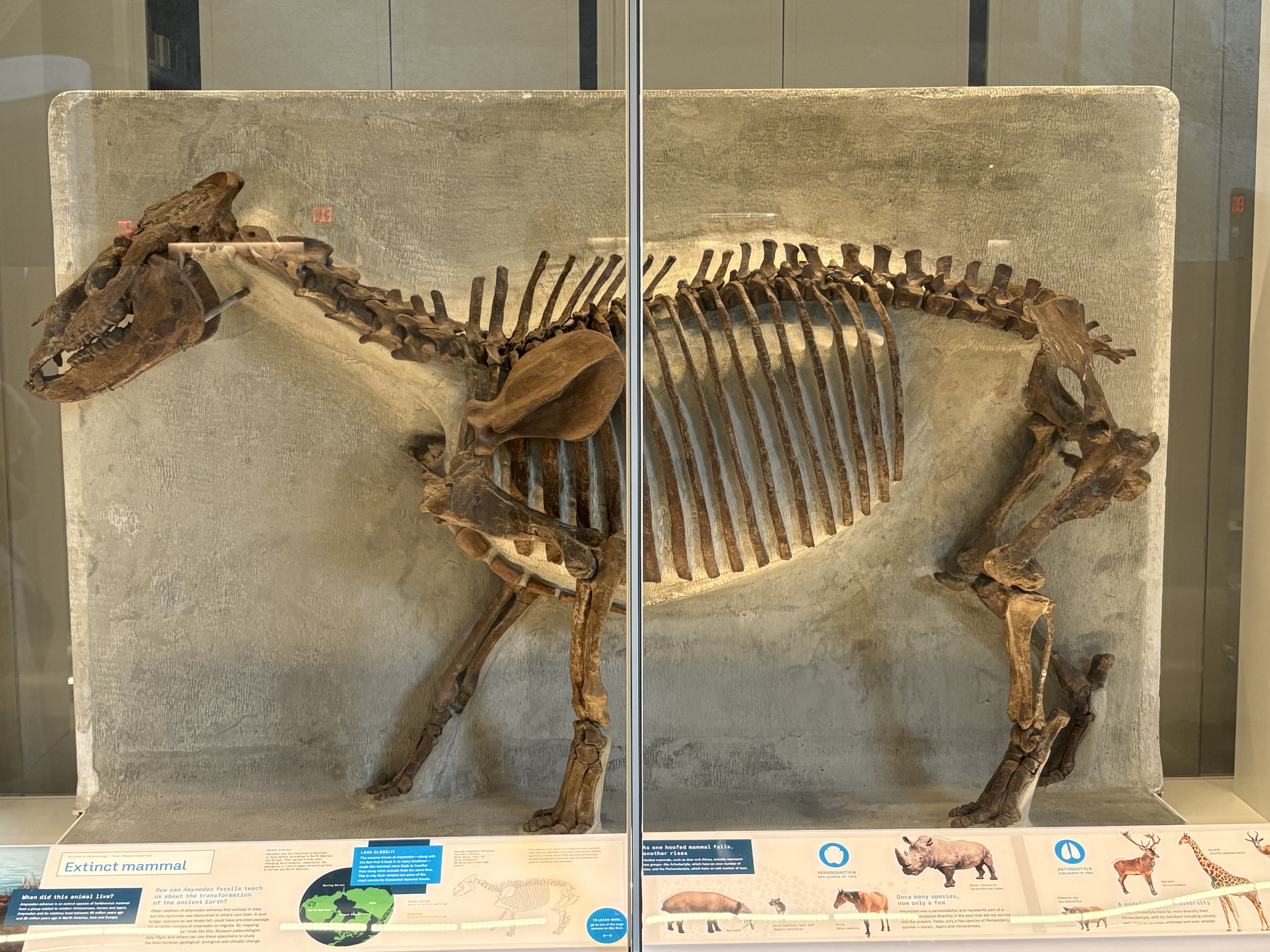
- White rhinoceros (Rhinocerotidae) Paraceratherium (Paraceratheriidae) Hyracodon (Hyracodontidae) Amynodon (Amynodontidae)

Scientific classification
- Kingdom: Animalia
- Phylum: Chordata
- Class: Mammalia
- Order: Perissodactyla
- Clade: Tapiromorpha
- Suborder: Ceratomorpha
- Superfamily: Rhinocerotoidea; Gray, 1821

Families and genera
- Generally recognized families: †Amynodontidae; †Hyracodontidae; †Paraceratheriidae; Rhinocerotidae; Sometimes recognized: †Eggysodontidae (or subfamily in Hyracodontidae); †Forstercooperiidae (or subfamily in Paraceratheriidae); Incertae sedis genera: †Armania; †Breviodon?; †Fouchia; †Hyrachyus; †Indolophus; †Megacanodon; †Minchenoletes; †Selanaletes; †Teletaceras; †Triplopus; †Uintaceras; †Yimengia

= Rhinocerotoidea =

Rhinocerotoids Temporal range: Eocene–Recent

Superfamily of mammals

Rhinocerotoidea is a superfamily of perissodactyls which includes the living rhinoceroses and their extinct relatives. In addition to rhinoceroses (Rhinocerotidae), Rhinocerotoidea also comprises at least three extinct families: the Amynodontidae, Hyracodontidae, and Paraceratheriidae. The relationships between the different groups are not well resolved, and two additional extinct families are sometimes recognized, the Eggysodontidae and Forstercooperiidae.

Extinct non-rhinocerotid members of the group are sometimes considered rhinoceroses in a broad sense. Although the term 'rhinoceroses' is sometimes used to refer to all of these, a less ambiguous vernacular term for this group is 'rhinocerotoids'. Rhinocerotidae are sometimes called "true rhinoceroses" to distinguish them from other rhinocerotoids.

== Internal classification ==
=== Families ===
Rhinocerotoidea has traditionally been divided into three families: the extant Rhinocerotidae (true rhinoceroses) and the extinct Amynodontidae (swamp rhinoceroses) and Hyracodontidae (running rhinoceroses). Phylogenetic analyses often recover the traditional Hyracodontidae as paraphyletic; the giant paraceratheres, historically considered part of the family, are therefore generally recognized as the distinct family Paraceratheriidae.

Whether additional families of rhinocerotoids are recognized depends on the analysis. Historically, the basal rhinocerotoid Hyrachyus and similar forms have sometimes been placed in a family named Hyrachyidae, though recent analyses do not recover Hyrachyus in a consistent position or group. Eggysodonts are variously separated into the distinct family Eggysodontidae or retained within Hyracodontidae; whether eggysodonts and hyracodonts form a monophyletic group varies between analyses. Forstercooperia and similar forms are treated either as paraceratheres or separated into the distinct family Forstercooperiidae. Analyses similarly vary in whether forstercooperiids and paraceratheres are recovered as a monophyletic group or not.

=== Phylogeny ===
Recent analyses do not reach a consensus on interrelationships within Rhinocerotoidea. The cladograms below follow phylogenetic analyses by Bai et al. (2020), Deng et al. (2021), Veine-Tonizzo et al. (2023), and Lu et al. (2026).

Topology A: Bai et al. (2020)

- Rhinocerotoidea (sensu lato)
  - - Indolophus
    - - Breviodon
      - Fouchia
  - - - Minchenoletes
      - - Triplopus cubitalus
        - Yimengia
    - Rhinocerotoidea (sensu stricto)
      - Hyrachyus
      - - Uintaceras
        - - Teletaceras
          - - Selenaletes
            - - Triplopus? youjingensis
              - - - Hyracodontidae
                    ⊞
                    - - Ephyrachyus
                      - Prohyracodon
                    - - Ardynia
                      - - Hyracodon
                        - - Epitriplopus
                          - Triplopides
                    ⊟
                - - - Forstercooperiidae
                      ⊞
                      - Forstercooperia
                      - - Gobicerops
                        - Pappaceras
                      ⊟
                  - - - Amynodontidae
                        ⊞
                        - - Caenolophus
                          - Proeggysodon
                        - - Rostriamynodon
                          - - Sharamynodon
                            - - Amynodon
                              - - Cadurcodon
                                - Metamynodon
                                - Paramynodon
                        ⊟
                    - - Eggysodon
                      - - Paraceratheriidae
                          ⊞
                          - Juxia
                          - - Paraceratherium
                            - Urtinotherium
                          ⊟
                        - Rhinocerotidae
                          ⊞
                          - Trigonias
                          - - Subhyracodon
                            - - Menoceras
                              - Rhinoceros
                          ⊟

Topology B: Deng et al. (2021)

- Rhinocerotoidea
  - Hyrachyus eximius
  - - Amynodontidae
      ⊞
      - Amynodon advenus
      - Rostriamynodon grangeri
      ⊟
    - - Triplopus cubitalis
      - - Hyracodontidae
          ⊞
          - Epitriplopus uintensis
          - - Hyracodon nebraskensis
            - Triplopides rieli
          ⊟
        - - - Uintaceras radinskyi
            - Rhinocerotidae
              ⊞
              - Teletaceras borissiaki
              - - Trigonias osborni
                - - Subhyracodon occidentalis
                  - - Rhinoceros unicornis
                    - - Ceratotherium simum
                      - Coelodonta antiquitatis
              ⊟
          - - Pappaceras confluense
            - - Forstercooperia totadentata
              - Paraceratheriidae
                ⊞
                - Juxia sharamurenensis
                - - Urtinotherium intermedium
                  - - - Turpanotherium yagouense
                      - Dzungariotherium orgosense
                    - - Aralotherium prohorovi
                      - - Paraceratherium grangeri
                        - - Paraceratherium huangheense
                          - - Paraceratherium asiaticum
                            - - Paraceratherium bugtiense
                              - - Paraceratherium lepidum
                                - Paraceratherium linxiaense
                ⊟

Topology C: Veine-Tonizzo et al. (2023)

- Rhinocerotoidea
  - - - Hyrachyus eximius
      - Hyrachyus princeps
    - Rhinocerotidae
      ⊞
      - Trigonias osborni
      - - Ronzotherium filholi
        - Aceratherium incisivum
      ⊟
  - - Eggysodontidae
      ⊞
      - - Proeggysodon qiui
        - Triplopus obliquidens
      - - Eggysodon osborni
        - Allacerops turgaica
      ⊟
    - - Unnamed clade
        - Pappaceras confluens
        - - Uintaceras radinskyi
          - Teletaceras radinskyi
      - - - Hyracodon nebraskensis
          - Paraceratheriidae
            ⊞
            - Urtinotherium intermedium
            - - Paraceratherium bugtiense
              - Paraceratherium transouralicum
            ⊟
        - - "Pappaceras" meiomenus
          - Amynodontidae
            ⊞
            - Rostriamynodon grangeri
            - - Amynodon advenus
              - - Sharamynodon mongoliensis
                - - Metamynodontini
                    - Paramynodon birmanicus
                    - - Megalamynodon regalis
                      - - Sellamynodon zimborensis
                        - Metamynodon planifrons
                  - Cadurcodontini
                    - - "Amynodon" reedi
                      - - Zaisanamynodon borisovi
                        - Zaisanamynodon protheroi
                    - - Sianodon gaowangouensis
                      - - - - Amynodontopsis bodei
                            - Amynodontopsis aff. bodei
                          - - Cadurcotherium minus
                            - Cadurcotherium cayluxi
                        - - Cadurcodon bahoensis
                          - - Cadurcodon maomingensis
                            - - Cadurcodon ardynensis
                              - Cadurcodon kazakademius
            ⊟

Topology D: Lu et al. (2026)

- Rhinocerotoidea
  - - Indolophus
    - - Fouchia
      - Breviodon acares
  - - - Minchenoletes erlianensis
      - - Yimengia
        - Triplopus cubitalus
    - - - Ephyrachyus
        - Hyrachyus modestus
      - - Uintaceras radinskyi
        - - Selanaletes scopaeus
          - - - - - Hyracodontidae
                    - Allaceropinae
                      ⊞
                      - Guangnanodon youngi
                      - Megacanodon dongxiangense
                      - Allacerops ningdongica
                      - - "Moissac materials"
                        - Allacerops turgaica
                      ⊟
                    - - Eggysodontinae
                        ⊞
                        - Eggysodon lingwuensis
                        - - Eggysodon gaudryi
                          - - Eggysodon osborni
                            - - "Allacerops" minor
                              - Proeggysodon qiui
                        ⊟
                      - Hyracodontinae
                        ⊞
                        - Hyracodon nebraskensis
                        - - - Prohyracodon orientale
                            - Ardynia
                          - - Triplopides rieli
                            - - - Epitriplopus uintensis
                                - Ilianodon lunanensis
                              - - "Hyracodon" priscidens
                                - "Prohyracodon" meridionale
                        ⊟
                  - Rhinocerotidae
                    ⊞
                    - Trigonias
                    - - Subhyracodon occidentalis
                      - - Rhinoceros unicornis
                        - Menoceras arikarense
                    ⊟
                - Teletaceras
              - - Forstercooperiidae
                  ⊞
                  - Pappaceras
                  - - Forstercooperia
                    - Gobicerops
                  ⊟
                - Paraceratheriidae
                  ⊞
                  - Juxia
                  - - Urtinotherium
                    - Paraceratherium
                  ⊟
            - Amynodontidae
              ⊞
              - Caenolophus promissus
              - - Rostriamynodon grangeri
                - - Sharamynodon mongoliensis
                  - - Amynodon
                    - - Paramynodon
                      - - Metamynodon
                        - Cadurcodon
              ⊟
