= Armania =

Armania may refer to:

- a misspelling of Armenia, a country in the South Caucasus region of Eurasia
- Armania (plant), a synonym for Encelia, a genus of the plant family Asteraceae
- Armania (insect) Dlussky, 1983, a genus of fossil ant-relatives, the type of the family Armaniidae
- Armania (mammal) Gabunia and Dashzeveg 1988, a genus of prehistoric rhinocerotoid mammals
