= Perasciuravus =

Perasciuravus Temporal range: Early Eocene

Scientific classification
- Kingdom: Animalia
- Phylum: Chordata
- Class: Mammalia
- Infraclass: Placentalia
- Order: Rodentia
- Family: †Sciuravidae
- Genus: †Perasciuravus; Korth, 2020
- Species: †P. mcintoshi

Binomial name
- †Perasciuravus mcintoshi Korth, 2020

Extinct genus of rodents

Perasciuravus is an extinct genus of sciuravid rodent that lived during the Bridgerian.

== Distribution ==
Perasciuravus mcintoshi is known from the Washakie Formation of Wyoming.
