= Aralotherium =

Aralotherium Temporal range: Oligocene, 28–23 Ma

Scientific classification
- Domain: Eukaryota
- Kingdom: Animalia
- Phylum: Chordata
- Class: Mammalia
- Order: Perissodactyla
- Family: †Paraceratheriidae
- Genus: †Aralotherium; Borissiak, 1939

Type species
- †Aralotherium prohorovi Borissiak, 1939

Species
- A. prohorovi Borissiak, 1939; A. sui (Ye, Meng & Wu, 2003)

Extinct genus of indricothere

Aralotherium is an extinct genus of hornless rhinocerotoids closely related to Paraceratherium, one of the largest terrestrial mammals that has ever existed. It lived in China and Kazakhstan during the late Oligocene epoch (28–23 million years ago). It is classified as a member of the Paraceratheriidae subfamily Paraceratheriinae.

Two species are known, A. prohorovi and A. sui.
