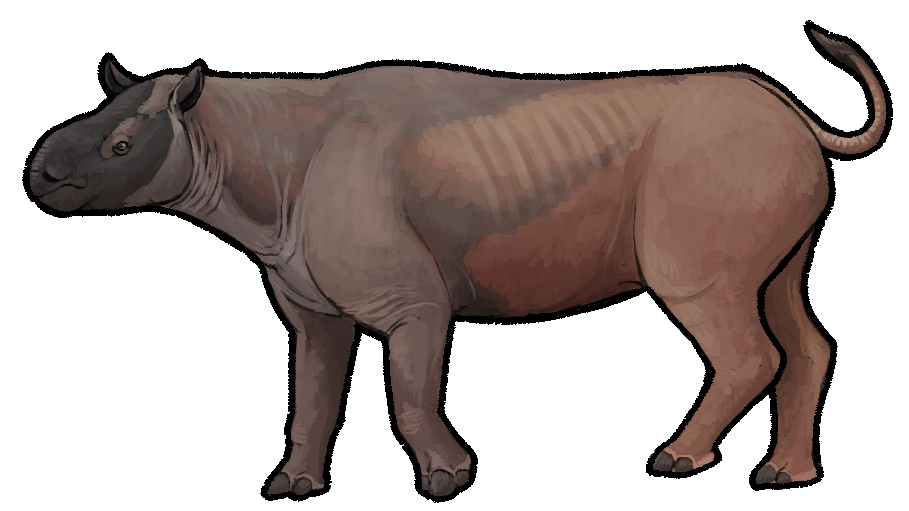
- Life restoration

Scientific classification
- Kingdom: Animalia
- Phylum: Chordata
- Class: Mammalia
- Infraclass: Placentalia
- Order: Perissodactyla
- Superfamily: Rhinocerotoidea
- Genus: †Megacanodon
- Species: †M. dongxiangense

Binomial name
- †Megacanodon dongxiangense Lu et al., 2024

= Megacanodon =

Megacanodon Temporal range: Oligocene

Extinct genus of mammals

Megacanodon is an extinct genus of rhinocerotoid that inhabited China during the Oligocene epoch. It is a monotypic genus containing the species M. dongxiangense.
