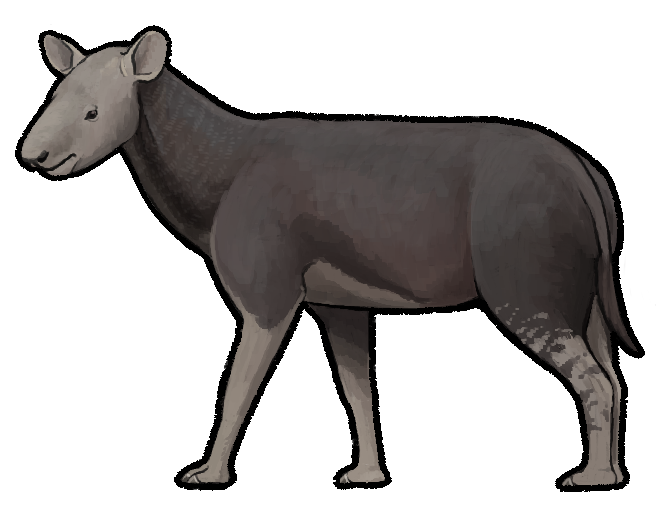
- Life restoration of Eggysodon

Scientific classification
- Kingdom: Animalia
- Phylum: Chordata
- Class: Mammalia
- Order: Perissodactyla
- Superfamily: Rhinocerotoidea
- Family: †Eggysodontidae; Breuning, 1923

Genera
- †Allacerops; †Eggysodon; †Guangnanodon; †Proeggysodon

= Eggysodontidae =

Eggysodonts Temporal range: Oligocene, 34–23.03 Ma

Extinct family of perissodactyls

Eggysodontidae or Eggysodontinae is an extinct family or subfamily of rhinocerotoids. Fossils have been found in Oligocene deposits in Europe, the Caucasus, Central Asia, China, and Mongolia.

== Taxonomy ==
Eggysodonts are traditionally considered a subfamily of the rhinocerotoid family Hyracodontidae, as Eggysodontinae. Rhinocerotoid phylogeny is highly variable between analyses. Some recent analyses recover eggysodonts as outside of Hyracodontidae, which has led to some researchers recognizing them as a distinct family, Eggysodontidae. They have been recovered in a variety of different positions in the rhinocerotoid family tree. Some analyses still recover eggysodonts within a monophyletic Hyracodontidae, in which case they are still treated as a subfamily.

== Biology ==
Eggysodonts were small, ground-dwelling browsers.
