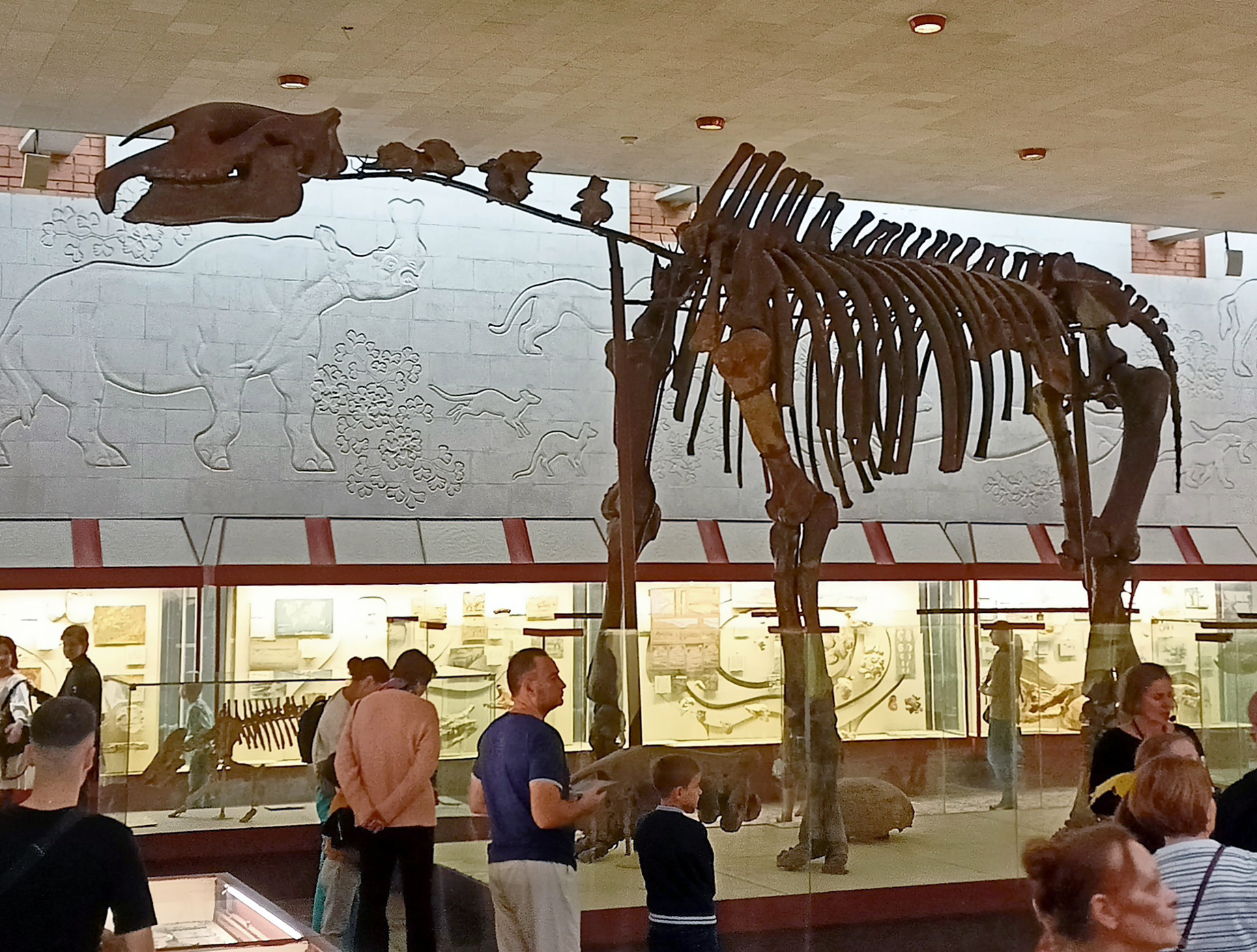
- Skeleton of Paraceratherium
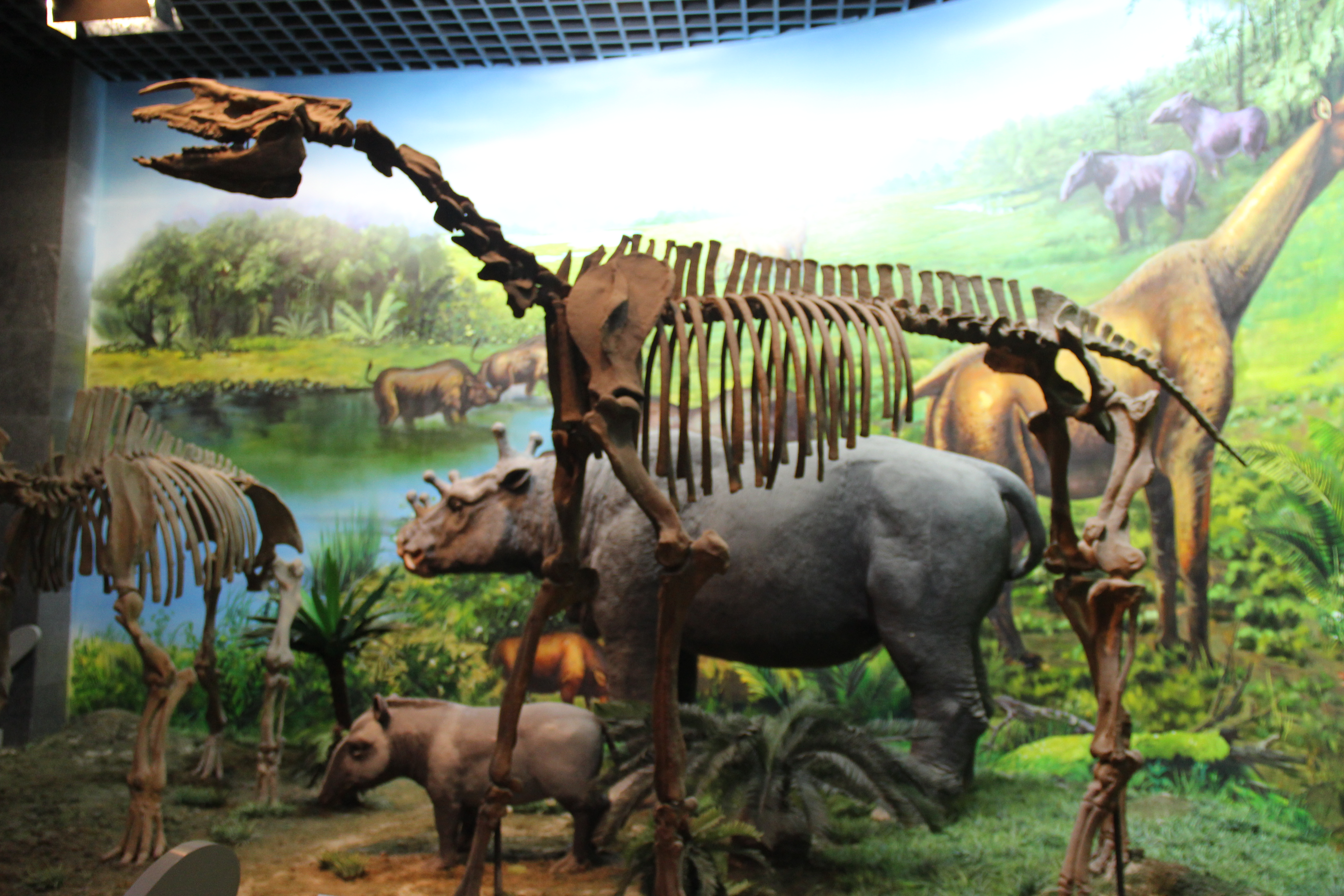
- Skeleton of Juxia

Scientific classification
- Kingdom: Animalia
- Phylum: Chordata
- Class: Mammalia
- Order: Perissodactyla
- Superfamily: Rhinocerotoidea
- Family: †Paraceratheriidae; Osborn, 1923

Subgroups
- †Forstercooperiinae?; †Forstercooperia; †Gobicerops; †Pappaceras; †Paraceratheriinae; †Aralotherium; †Dzungariotherium; †Juxia; †Paraceratherium; †Turpanotherium; †Urtinotherium

Synonyms
- Baluchitheriinae Osborn, 1923; Indricotheriinae Borissiak, 1923; Forstercooperiidae? Kretzoi, 1940

= Paraceratheriidae =

Paraceratheres Temporal range: Middle Eocene to Early Miocene, 47–23 Ma

Extinct family of mammals

Paraceratheres, historically also called indricotheres and baluchitheres, are long-limbed and hornless rhinocerotoids belonging to the family Paraceratheriidae. Paraceratheres were native to Asia and Eastern Europe, originated in the Eocene epoch and lived until the beginning of the Miocene. They represent some of the largest terrestrial mammals to have ever lived.

== Description ==
Size comparison one of the largest known Paraceratherium individuals compared to a giraffe and a human

The necks and limbs of paraceratheriids are elongate relative to those of living rhinoceroses. The earliest paraceratheres like Juxia were comparable in size with living rhinoceroses with a body mass of three quarters to one and a half tons, while later members grew substantially larger, with the largest representatives (Dzungariotherium and Paraceratherium) estimated to have a body mass of around 17 to 20 tons, making them the largest land mammals to have ever lived (though possibly equalled or exceeded by some proboscideans in body mass). Non-forstercoopine paraceratheriids are united by the possession of a retracted nasal notch, a lack of contact between the premaxilla and nasal bones of the skull, enlarged upper and lower first incisors and small lower canine teeth, along with characters relating to the size and shape of the molars and premolars.

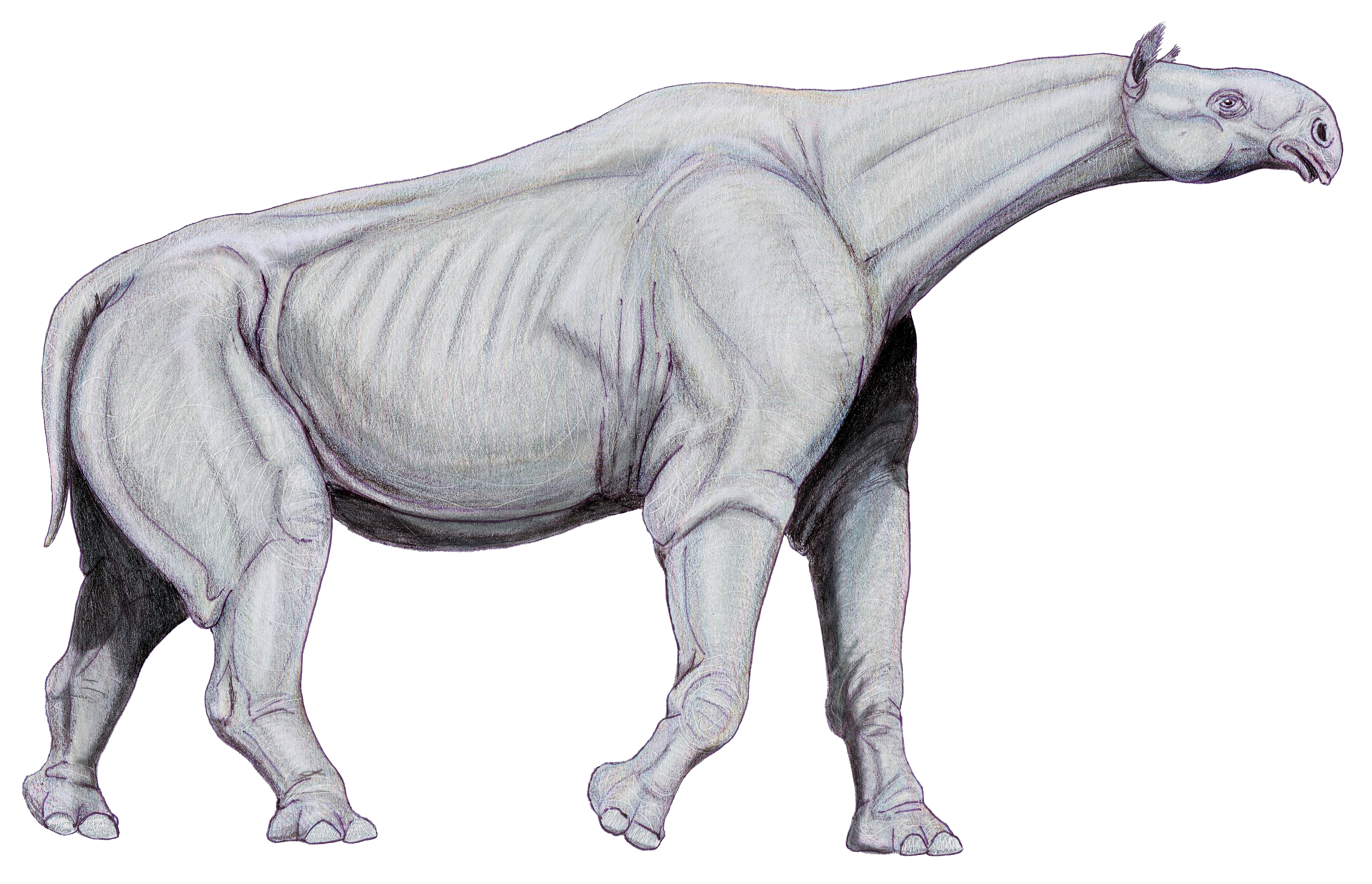
Artist's reconstruction of Paraceratherium. It stood about 4.8 metres (15.7 feet) tall at the shoulder and weighed 15 to 20 tonnes (33,000 to 44,000 lb).

== Range ==
Their range spanned from Eastern Europe in the west, the Indian subcontinent in the south, to Northern China in the east.

== Ecology ==
Paraceratheriids are thought to have been primarily browsers.

== Taxonomy ==
Paraceratheres were originally classified as members of the family Rhinocerotidae. In 1962, Vera Gromova was the first to propose that paraceratheres did not belong in Rhinocerotidae and were instead a distinct family, for which she used the name Indricotheriidae.

Radinsky argued that the traditionally understood Rhinocerotidae was a polyphyletic group, which included rhinocerotoids with erect tusks derived from their canines (Allacerops and relatives), stubby and conical tusks derived from the first pair of incisors (Paraceratherium and relatives), and chisel-shaped and lanceolate tusks derived from the second pair of inscisors (Epiaceratherium, Trigonias, and their descendants). The Epiaceratherium-Trigonias group includes virtually all rhinocerotoids younger than the Oligocene, including modern genera, and Radinsky proposed restricting Rhinocerotidae to encompass only this group. Radinsky referred the other former rhinocerotids that fell outside this group, including Paraceratherium and relatives, to the family Hyracodontidae. Radinsky's version of Hyracodontidae was widely recognized as a paraphyletic wastebasket taxon. Some phylogenetic analyses recovered paraceratheres separately, but they were nevertheless generally considered to represent a subfamily within Hyracodontidae.

In 2016, Wang et al. recovered paraceratheres separately from hyracodonts, and recognized them to represent the distinct family Paraceratheriidae. Subsequent analyses have continued to use Paraceratheriidae as a separate family. The status of the small and primitive forstercooperiines (Forstercooperia, Gobicerops, Pappaceras) is variable between analyses. Wang et al. placed them in Paraceratheriidae, but they have sometimes been recovered in other positions in Rhinocerotoidea. Some authors therefore place forstercooperiines in a distinct family, Forstercooperiidae.

Cladogram after Deng et al. 2021:

- Rhinocerotoidea
  - Hyrachyus
  - - Amynodontidae
    - - Hyracodontidae
      - - Uintaceras + Rhinocerotidae (modern rhinoceroses)
        - Paraceratheriidae (s.l.)
          - Pappaceras
          - - Forstercooperia
            - Paraceratheriidae (s.s.)
              - Juxia
              - - Urtinotherium
                - - - Turpanotherium
                    - Dzungariotherium
                  - - Aralotherium
                    - Paraceratherium
