= Indolophus =

Indolophus Temporal range: Early Eocene

Scientific classification
- Kingdom: Animalia
- Phylum: Chordata
- Class: Mammalia
- Order: Perissodactyla
- Superfamily: Tapiroidea
- Family: Indolophidae
- Genus: Indolophus
- Species: I. guptai

Binomial name
- Indolophus guptai Pilgrim, 1925

Extinct genus of mammals

Indolophus is an extinct genus of perissodactyl belonging to the clade Tapiromorpha, which includes modern-day tapirs. Fossils have been found in Eocene deposits of Myanmar.

== Description ==
Indolophus can be distinguished from other tapiromorphs in the characteristics of the upper dentition; it is distinguished from other basal tapiromorphs in having a more developed molar and protolophid and hypolophid. Indolophus is more primitive than tapiroids due to the lophodont dentiton and the absence of lingual and buccal cingula and molar metaconule. I. guptai has been estimated to have had a body mass of approximately 20.7 kg.
