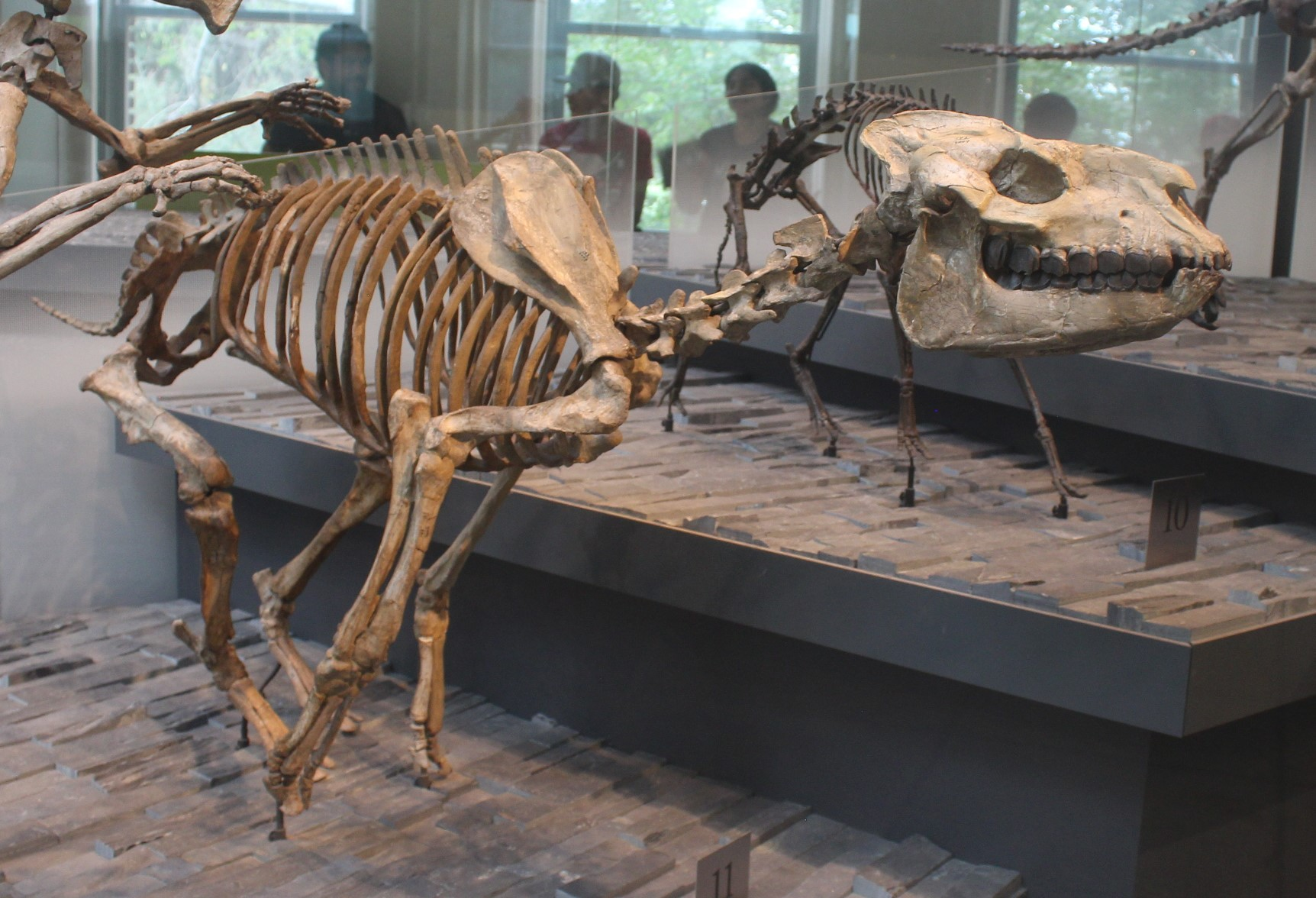
- Skeleton in Natural History Museum of Los Angeles

Scientific classification
- Kingdom: Animalia
- Phylum: Chordata
- Class: Mammalia
- Order: Perissodactyla
- Family: †Hyracodontidae
- Genus: †Hyracodon; Leidy, 1856

Species
- †H. browni; †H. leidyanus; †H. medius; †H. nebraskensis; †H. petersoni; †H. affinis; †H. eximus; †H. modestus; †H. primus; †H. princeps; †H. priscidens

= Hyracodon =

Hyracodon Temporal range: Middle Eocene–Late Oligocene

Extinct genus of mammal

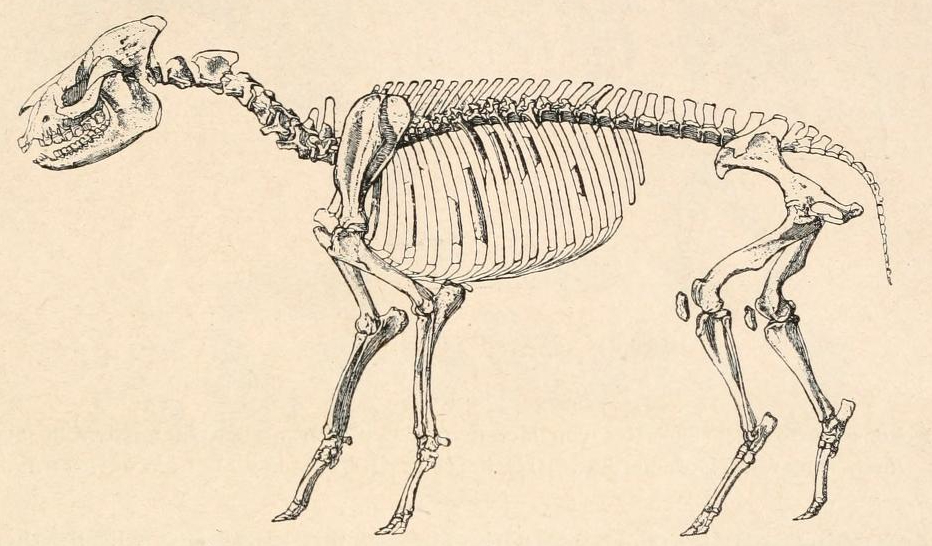
Skeletal reconstruction of Hyracodon

Hyracodon ('hyrax tooth') is an extinct genus of perissodactyl mammal from the White River Formation.

== Description ==
Hyracodon was a lightly built, pony-like mammal about 1.5 m (5 ft) in length, with a large skull in comparison to the rest of the body. Hyracodon was much smaller than modern rhinocerotoides and differed very little in appearance from the primitive horses with which it was contemporaneous (32–26 million years ago). It had a short, broad snout and its long, slender limbs had three digits. When put next to the comtemporary Mesohippus, Hyracodon had a proportionally long neck, with robust vertebrae. Compared to earlier hyracodontids from the Uinta Formation, like Triplopus, Hyracodon had a more gracile manus structure. The median toe was enlarged whilst the lateral toes were greatly reduced. The molars of Hyracodon were similar to those of the modern day rhinoceros, with the last upper molar assuming a triangular shape. The canines and incisors, however were quite different. In form, the anterior teeth of Hyracodon were small and similar in shape, being pointed and curved.

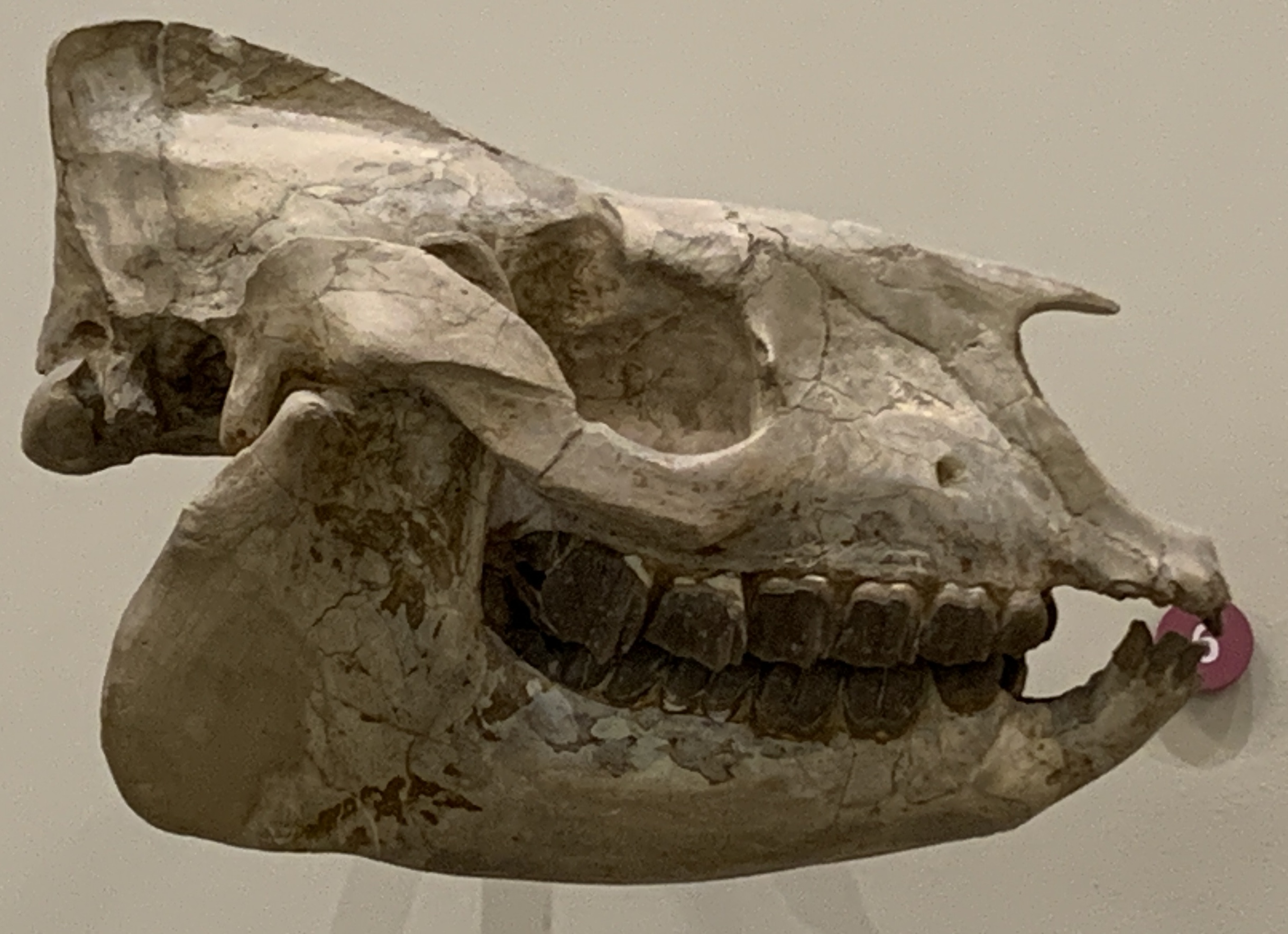
H. nebraskensis skull, found near Hermosa, South Dakota.

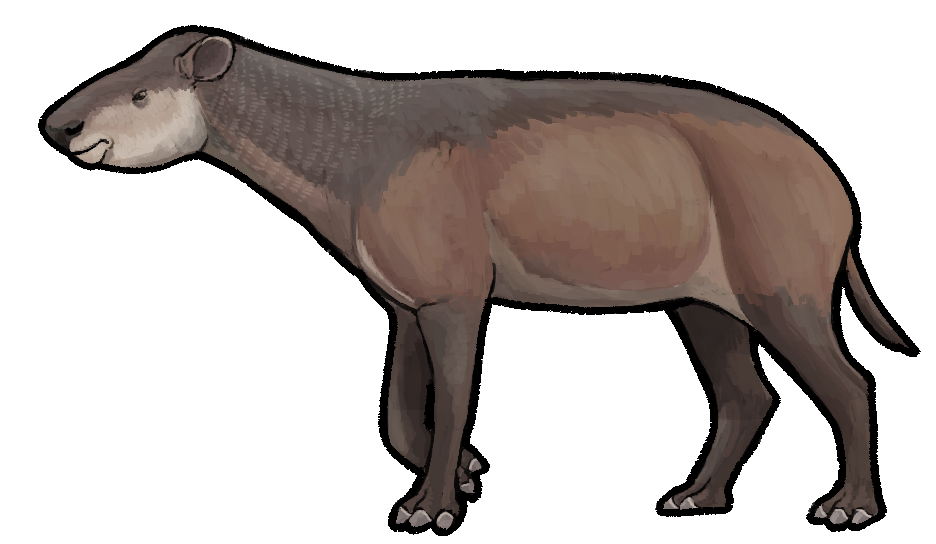
Reconstruction of H. nebraskensis.

Like the primitive horses, hyracodonts inhabited open forests and wooded steppes and turned from browsing foliage to grazing grass. They died out without leaving any descendants and they mark the end of the phylogenetic branch of hornless, running rhinocerotoids.

Illustrations

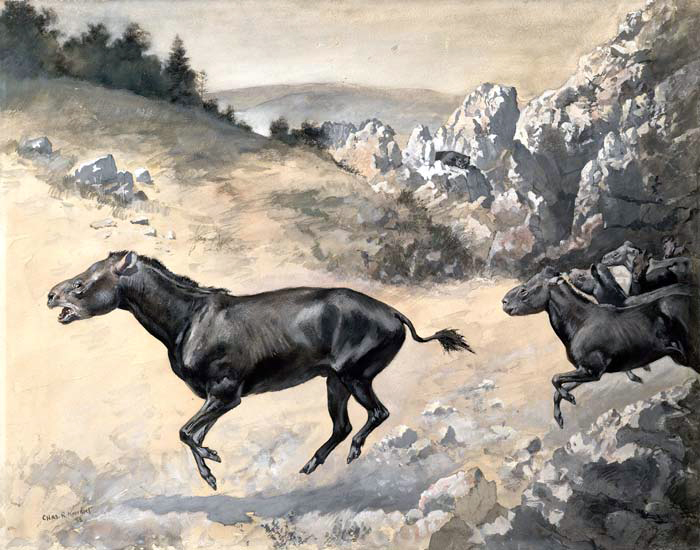
1896, Charles R. Knight

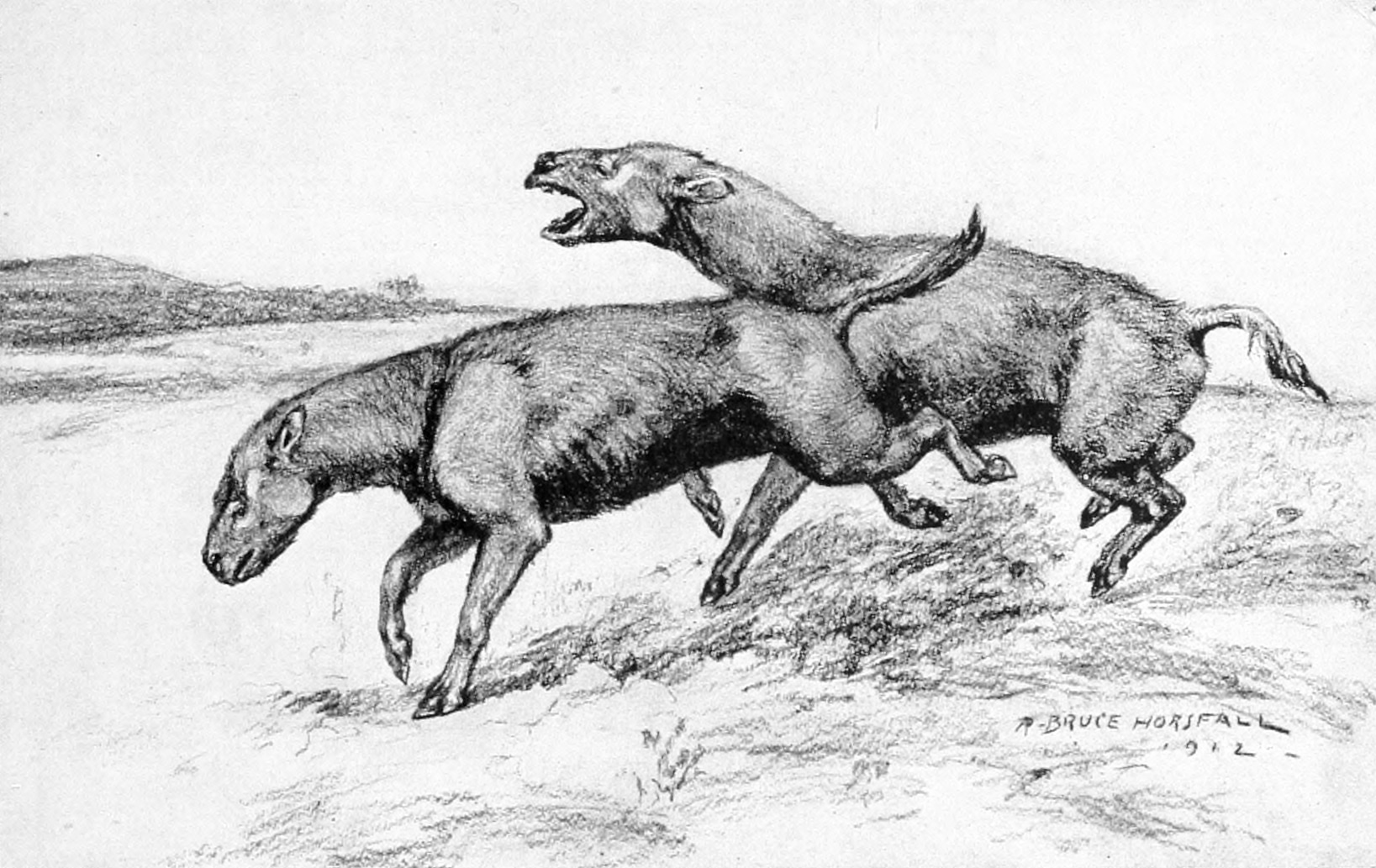
1913, Robert Bruce Horsfall

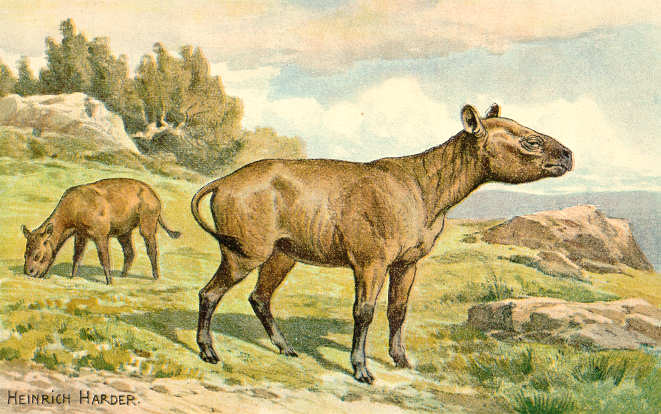
1920, Heinrich Harder

== Palaeoecology ==
Palaeoecological analysis of a specimen of cf. Hyracodon nebraskensis from Rancho Gaitán, Chihuahua found it to mainly feed on C_{3} plants located near bodies of water based on its δ^{13}C_{VPDB} and δ^{18}O_{VPDB} values. Dental mesowear and microwear were also performed on the specimen but were found to be unusable.

== Sources ==
- Benes, Josef (1979). Prehistoric Animals and Plants. Prague, CZ: Artua. p. 220.
