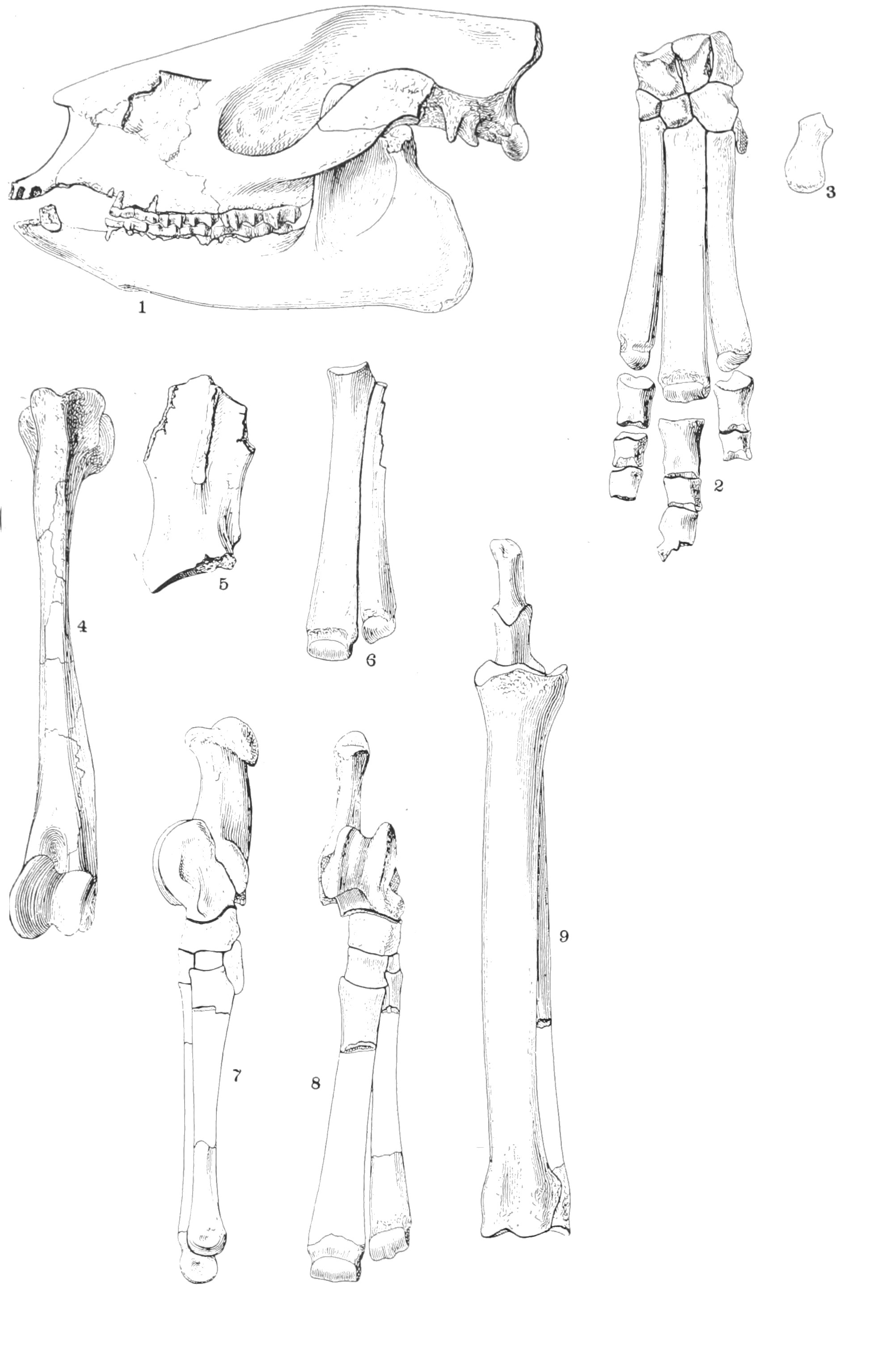

Scientific classification
- Kingdom: Animalia
- Phylum: Chordata
- Class: Mammalia
- Order: Perissodactyla
- Family: †Hyracodontidae
- Genus: †Triplopus; Cope, 1880

Type species
- T. cubitalis Cope, 1880

Species
- T. cubitalis Cope, 1880; T. woodi Stock, 1936; T. mergensis Dashzeveg, 1991; T. jeminaiensis Bai et al., 2020

Synonyms
- Eotrigonias petersoni (Wood, 1927)

= Triplopus =

Triplopus Temporal range: Eocene, 46.2–42.0 Ma

Extinct perissodactyl genus

Triplopus is a genus of perissodactyl, possibly a hyracodont, from the Uinta Formation. Some species formerly assigned to Triplopus have been assigned to Eotrigonias and Hyrachyus in the past, though this is disputed. Triplopus was likely a cursorial browser, similar to other hyracodonts.

== Description ==
Compared to derived hyracodonts, like Hyracodon, Triplopus was fairly gracile. Triplopus possesses three toes on each forefoot and three on each hind foot, whereas other perissodactyls from the Uinta Formation generally bear four on their forefeet and three on their hindfeet.
