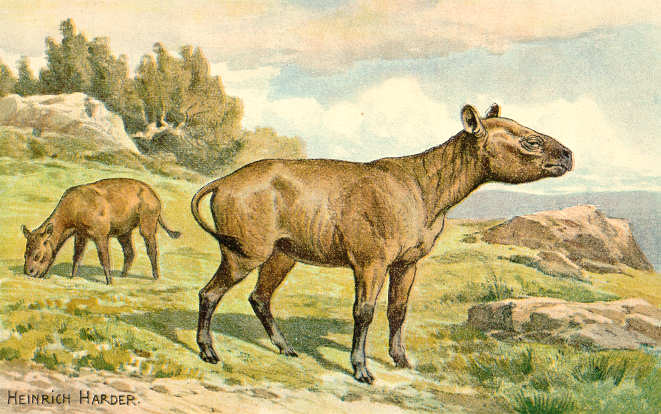
- Hyracodon

Scientific classification
- Kingdom: Animalia
- Phylum: Chordata
- Class: Mammalia
- Order: Perissodactyla
- Superfamily: Rhinocerotoidea
- Family: †Hyracodontidae; Cope, 1879

Genera
- †Eggysodontinae?
- †Hyracodontinae
  - †Ardynia
  - †Epitriplopus
  - †Hyracodon
  - †Ilianodon
  - †Prohyracodon
  - †Triplopides
  - †Ulanodon
Possible hyracodonts
- †Armania
- †Ephyrachyus
- †Triplopus
- †Toxotherium

= Hyracodontidae =

Hyracodonts Temporal range: Ypresian-Chattian, 48.6–26.3 Ma

Extinct family of mammals

The Hyracodontidae are an extinct family of rhinocerotoids endemic to North America, Europe, and Asia during the Eocene through early Oligocene, living from 48.6 to 26.3 million years ago (Mya), existing about 22.3 million years. Hyracodonts have been nicknamed running rhinoceroses due to their long limbs, which made them more specialized for running than any other rhinocerotoid group. The hyracodonts thrived in the rainforests of Kazakhstan, Pakistan, and southwest China, a former coastal region. Fossil evidence also extends their geographical range to Germany, as well as to Mongolia.

Hyracodontidae is sometimes considered a problematic grouping; several groups historically included in the family have since been removed and broken out to their own families, such as Paraceratheriidae, and Hyracodontidae has been suggested to be polyphyletic.
