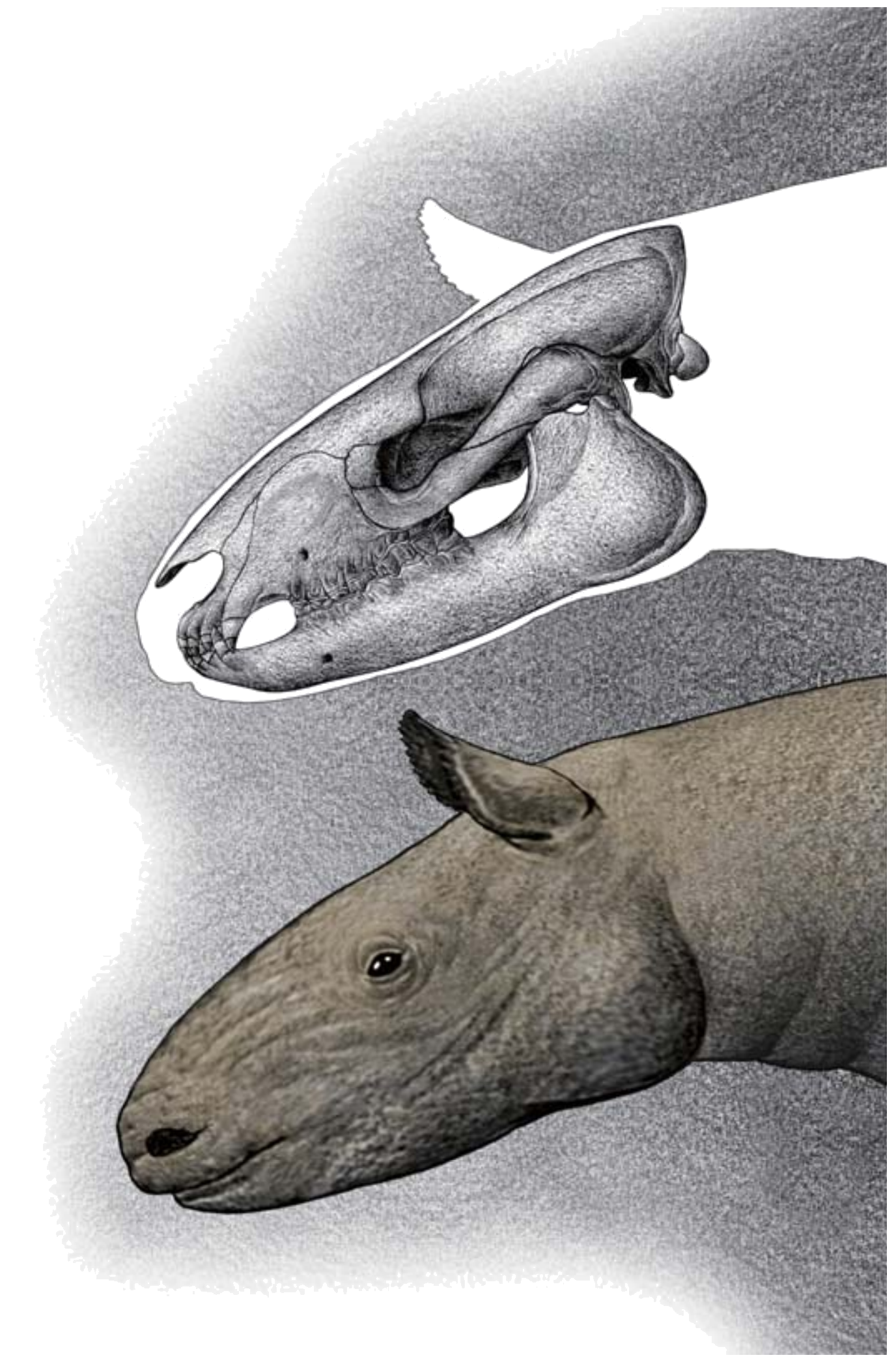
- Illustration of the skull and life restoration of P. minuta

Scientific classification
- Kingdom: Animalia
- Phylum: Chordata
- Class: Mammalia
- Order: Perissodactyla
- Superfamily: Rhinocerotoidea
- Family: †Paraceratheriidae
- Genus: †Pappaceras; Wood, 1963

Type species
- †Pappaceras confluens Wood, 1963

Other species
- †P. minuta (Lucas et al., 1981); †P. meiomenus Wang et al., 2016

Synonyms
- Species synonymy: P. minuta: Forstercooperia minuta Lucas et al., 1981; ?"Forstercooperia crudus" Gabunia, 1977 (nomen nudum)

= Pappaceras =

Pappaceras Temporal range: Early Eocene, 50–48 Ma

Extinct genus of mammals

Pappaceras is an extinct genus of rhinocerotoids from the Early Eocene of Asia belonging to Paraceratheriidae.

== Taxonomy ==
In 1963, material including a partial skull containing cheek teeth was unearthed in Late Eocene deposits of Mongolia. These remains were identified as from a true rhinoceros by Wood, who found them an important discovery with the scant amount of previous cranial material of early rhinocerotids available. On July 25, the same year, a paper was published by Wood concerning the taxonomy and osteology of these remains, in which he named them a new genus and species (or binomial) as well as re-ranking a previously named family as a subfamily containing the new taxon. The binomial created was Pappaceras confluens, classified as a close relative of Forstercooperia within Forstercooperiinae (before Forstercooperiidae, named in 1940 by Kretzoi). Wood noted that the generic name is derived from the Latin word πaππos, "grandfather", and the Greek words alpha, "without", and keras, "horn", translating as "Grandfather without horn". The species name is based on the confluent morphology of the teeth. The catalogue number for the skull is AMNH 26660, and it specifically preserved a "front half of the skull and a complete lower jaw, with most of the teeth and remaining alveoli, totaling a full placental series". Other remains included a portion of the mandible and a premolar. All of these specimens were from the lame locality, the Upper Gray Clays, of the Irdin Manha Formation in Inner Mongolia. In the revision by Radnisky, it was found that this species was assignable to Forstercooperia, and the new combination F. confluens was erected. This species is well known, although in the 1981 review of Forstercooperia, it was synonymized with F. grandis.

In the 1960s, newly uncovered material from the Arshanto Formation was identified as belonging to a new species of rhinocerotoid. Originally, they were found to be from F. confluens, as they were in the same location as that species holotype. They were later assigned to Forstercooperia sp., with no new name being given. The material included an almost complete skull, an almost complete lower jaw, an anterior portion of the skull, and an astragalus. These bones were first assigned a new species by Lucas et al., Forstercooperia minuta. They were found to be a unique species based on their size and the anatomy of their teeth. The species has been retained in the species complex of Forstercooperia throughout major revisions, by Lucas et al. in 1981, Lucas and Sobus in 1989, and Holbrook and Lucas in 1997.

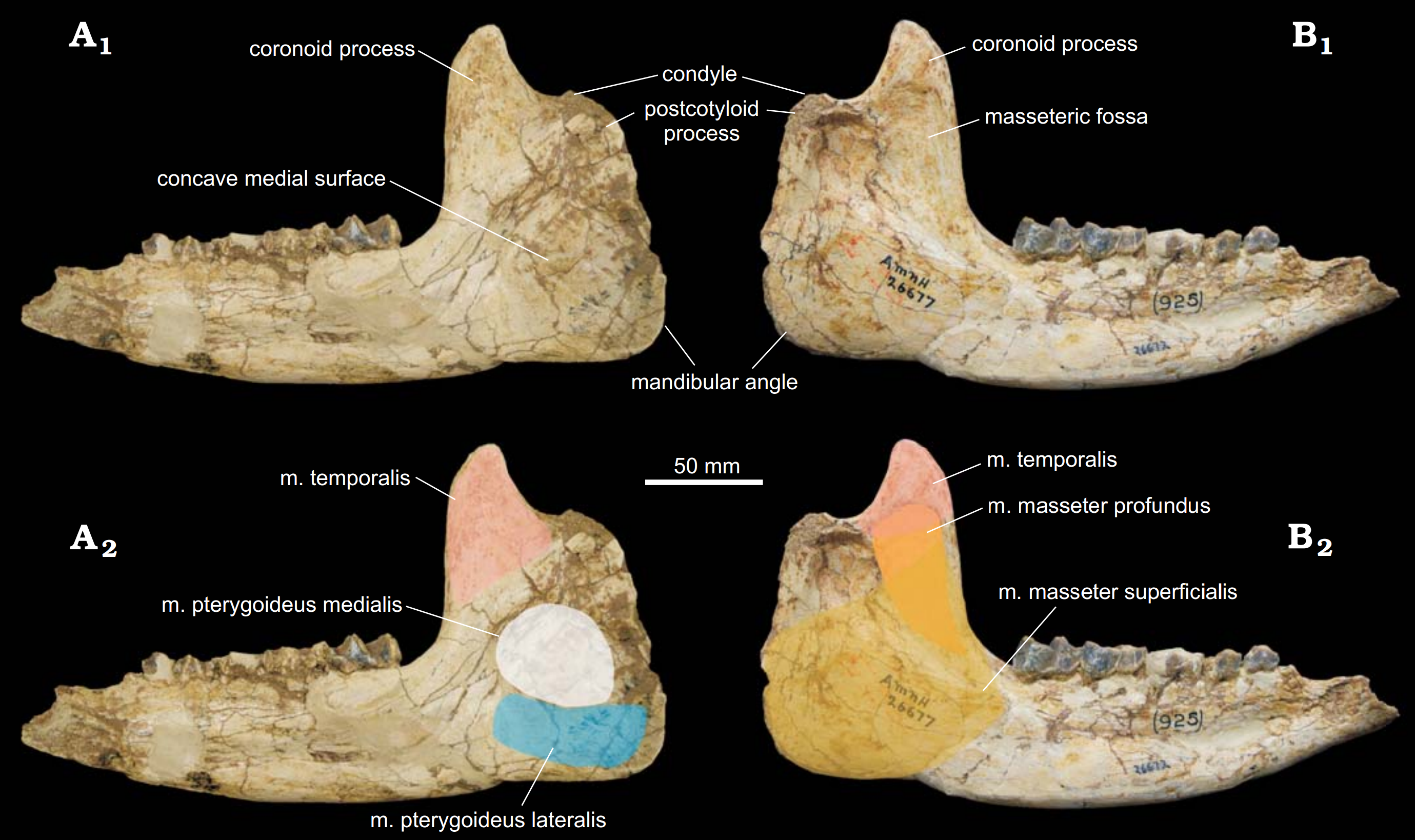
Mandible of P. meiomenus

In 1977, some the first description of a dentary from Kazakhstan's Sargamys Formation was published. Authored by Gabunia, the paper figured the dentary, as well as some other material. In the images caption, the dentary was assigned to as Forstercooperia sp. although the text used a different name. In the text, the dentary and its teeth were assigned to Forstercooperia crudus, although no size was mentioned. As the text did not have a description in it of F. crudus, the name is now considered a nomen nudum. Its material is possibly assignable to F. minuta, however. In 1997, other material from Kazakhstan, specifically the Kolpak Formation, was assigned to F. minuta, meaning that it certainly lived in Kazakhstan at the same time as F. crudus.

In a 1981 paper focusing purely on the genus Forstercooperia, it was found that there was very little diversity in the species found valid by Radinsky. This paper, authored by Spencer G. Lucas and Robert Schoch and Earl Manning and published in 1981 reviewed all currently-named species of Forstercooperia, and named the new species F. minuta. F. crudus, named in 1977 by Gabunia, was found to be a nomen nudum, and Pappaceras synonymized with Forsterocooperia. However, recent study has found Pappaceras to be generically distinct.

=== Evolution ===
The superfamily Rhinocerotoidea can be traced back to the early Eocene—about 50 million years ago—with early precursors such as Hyrachyus. Rhinocerotoidea contains three families; the Amynodontidae, the Rhinocerotidae ("true rhinoceroses"), and the Hyracodontidae. The diversity within the rhinoceros group was much larger in prehistoric times; sizes ranged from dog-sized to the size of Paraceratherium. There were long-legged, cursorial forms and squat, semi aquatic forms. Most species did not have horns. Rhinoceros fossils are identified as such mainly by characteristics of their teeth, which is the part of the animals most likely to be preserved. The upper molars of most rhinoceroses have a pi (π) shaped pattern on the crown, and each lower molar has paired L-shapes. Various skull features are also used for identification of fossil rhinoceroses.

== Description ==
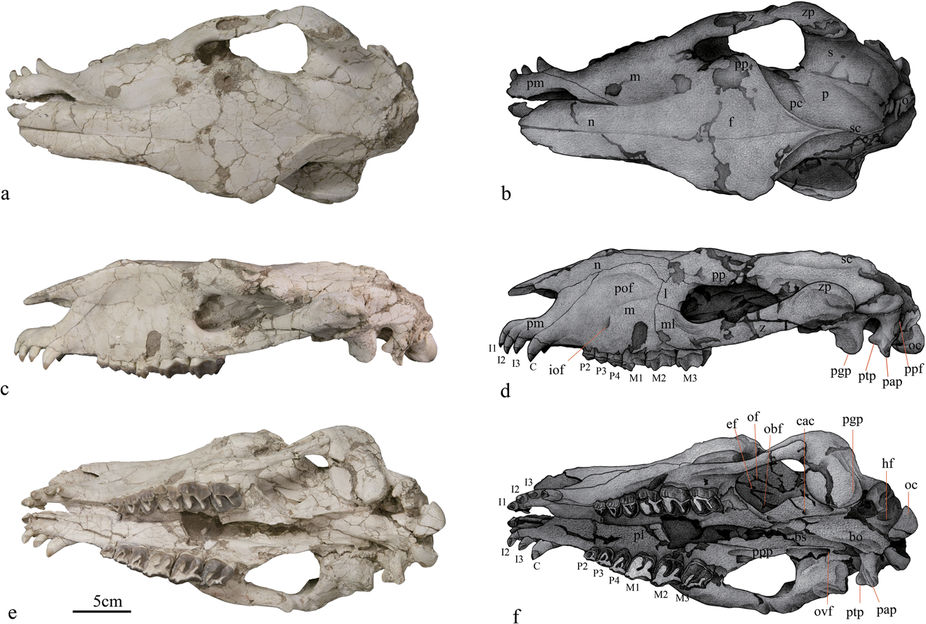
Skull of P. meiomenus

Pappaceras is known from a vast amount of cranial material, although only some scant postcranial remains. The largest species is P. confluens, followed P. minuta. The average size of all species, is about equal with a large dog, even though later genera like Juxia reached the size of a modern horse and Paraceratherium exceeded the size of the largest African elephant. Each species is distinguished by cheek tooth morphology, with the remaining skull quite similar. Like primitive rhinocerotoids, Pappaceras possesses blunt ends on the tips of its nasals, above the nasal incision. Unlike all modern rhinoceroses, the nasals of Pappaceras, as well as many related genera, lack rugosities, which suggests that they lacked any form of horn. The nasal incision extends fairly far into the upper jaw, ending just posterior to the canine. Pappaceras possesses a small post-incisor diastema, not as large as its descendants, and similar in size to that of Hyracodon.

== Distribution and habitat ==
Remains of Pappaceras have been found all across Asia. Most important remains are from the Early Eocene Arshanto Formation of Inner Mongolia (China). In 1963, the species Pappaceras confluens was described from the same region, probably within the same formation. Pappaceras minuta, is based on a maxilla from the Irdin Manha Formation as well. P. confluens is known from Shara Murun Formation, Ulan Shireh Formation and Houldjin Formation, as well as the Arshanto Formation. P. minuta is known from specimens only from the Arshanto Formation, as is P. meiomenus, and possibly the Shara Murun Formation of China, and the Kolpak Formation of Kazakhstan,
