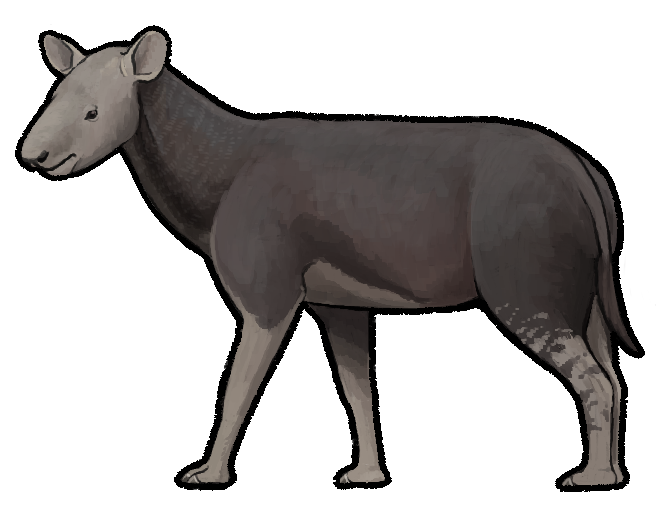
- Life restoration

Scientific classification
- Kingdom: Animalia
- Phylum: Chordata
- Class: Mammalia
- Order: Perissodactyla
- Family: †Eggysodontidae
- Genus: †Eggysodon; Roman, 1910

Type species
- †Eggysodon osborni Schlosser, 1902

Species
- E. cadibonense (Roger, 1898); E. gaudryi (Rames, 1886); E. osborni; E. pomeli (Roman, 1910); E. reichenaui (Deninger, 1903)

= Eggysodon =

Eggysodon Temporal range: Oligocene, 33.9–23.03 Ma

Extinct genus of mammal

Eggysodon gaudryi

Eggysodon is an extinct genus of odd-toed ungulate belong to the rhinoceros-like family Eggysodontidae. It was a small, ground-dwelling browser, and fossils have been found in Oligocene deposits throughout Europe. Eggysodon may have been related to Preaceratherium, and both had tusklike canines and smaller, and fewer, incisors.

Allacerops (=Teniseggysodon), a close relative of Eggysodon, was synonymized with Eggysodon by Heissig (1989), but is now considered a distinct genus.
