= Allacerops =

Allacerops Temporal range: Oligocene, 33.9–23.03 Ma

Scientific classification
- Kingdom: Animalia
- Phylum: Chordata
- Class: Mammalia
- Order: Perissodactyla
- Family: †Eggysodontidae
- Genus: †Allacerops; Wood, 1932

Type species
- †Epiaceratherium turgaicum Borissiak, 1915

Species
- †A. turgaica (Borissiak, 1915); †A.? minor (Beliajeva, 1954); †A. ningdongica Lu et al., 2026

Prehistoric mammal

Allacerops is an extinct genus of odd-toed ungulate belong to the rhinoceros-like family Eggysodontidae. It was a small, ground-dwelling browser, and fossils have been found in Oligocene deposits throughout Central and East Asia.

Allacerops was synonymized with Eggysodon by Heissig (1989), but is now considered a distinct genus. Unaware that Wood (1932) made turgaica the type species of Allacerops, Reshetov et al. (1993) erected Tenisia for "Epiaceratherium" turgaica. Tenisia, however, was already in use for a brachiopod, so Spassov (1994) erected Teniseggysodon as a replacement. In any case, Qiu et al. (1999) recognized Teniseggysodon a junior objective synonym of Allacerops as both were based on the same type species.
