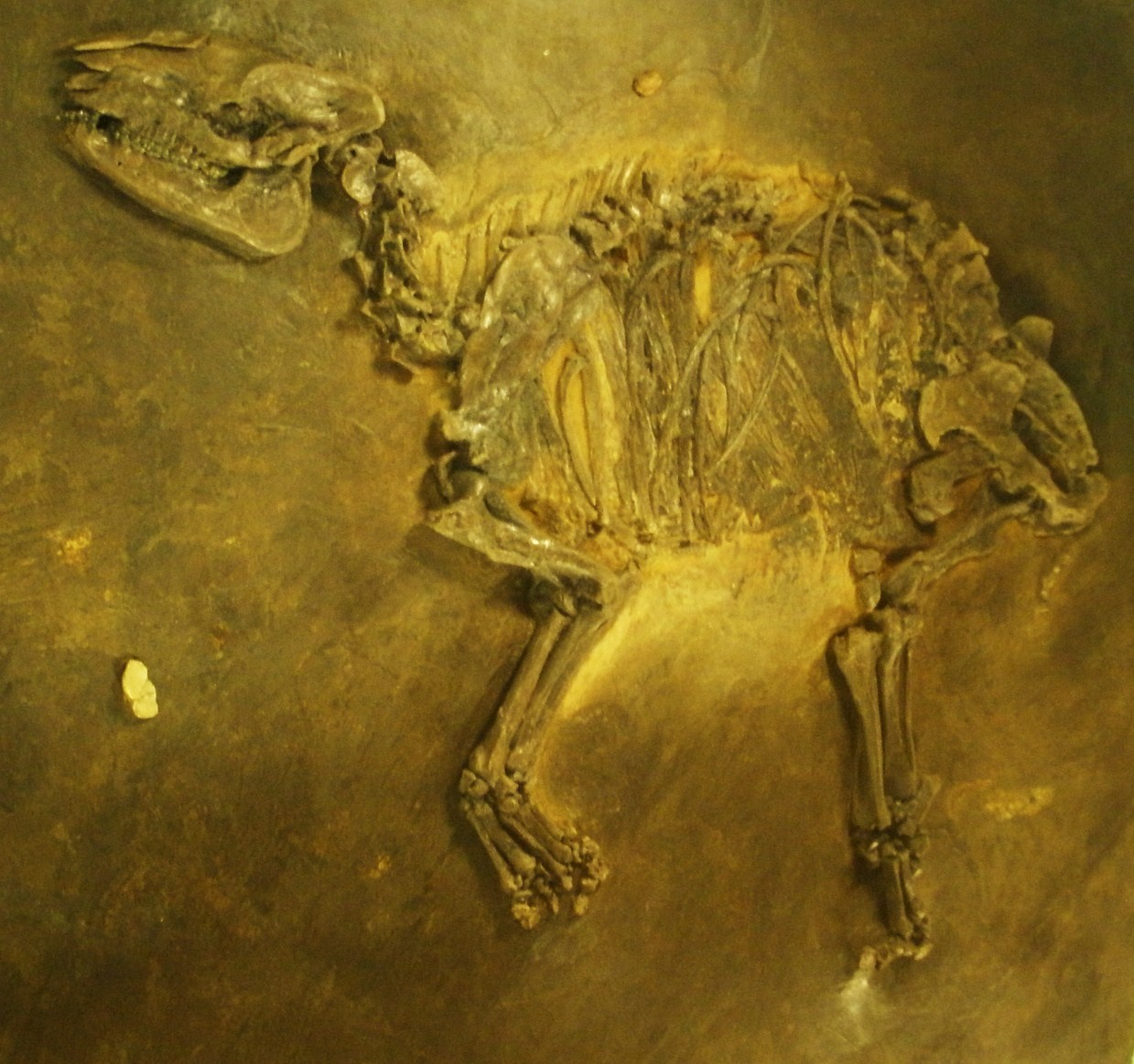
- Fossil

Scientific classification
- Kingdom: Animalia
- Phylum: Chordata
- Class: Mammalia
- Order: Perissodactyla
- Suborder: Ceratomorpha
- Superfamily: Rhinocerotoidea
- Genus: †Hyrachyus; Leidy, 1871

Species
- H. affinis; H. bicornutus; H. douglassi; H. eximius; H. lunanensis; H. modestus; H. minimus; H. minor; ?H. stehlini

= Hyrachyus =

Hyrachyus Temporal range: Eocene

Extinct genus of Mammals

Hyrachyus (from Hyrax and Ancient Greek: ὗς "pig") is an extinct genus of perissodactyl mammal that lived in Eocene Europe, North America, and Asia. Its remains have also been found in Jamaica.

== Description ==
Spanning 1.5 meters in length, Hyrachyus was related to palaeotheres. Physically, it would have looked very similar to modern tapirs, although it probably lacked the tapir's characteristic proboscis. Its teeth, however, resembled those of a rhinoceros, supporting the idea of its relationship with that group. It is proposed by some that Hyrachyus (or a hyrachyid of similar form) served as a common ancestor for North American rhinoceratoids.

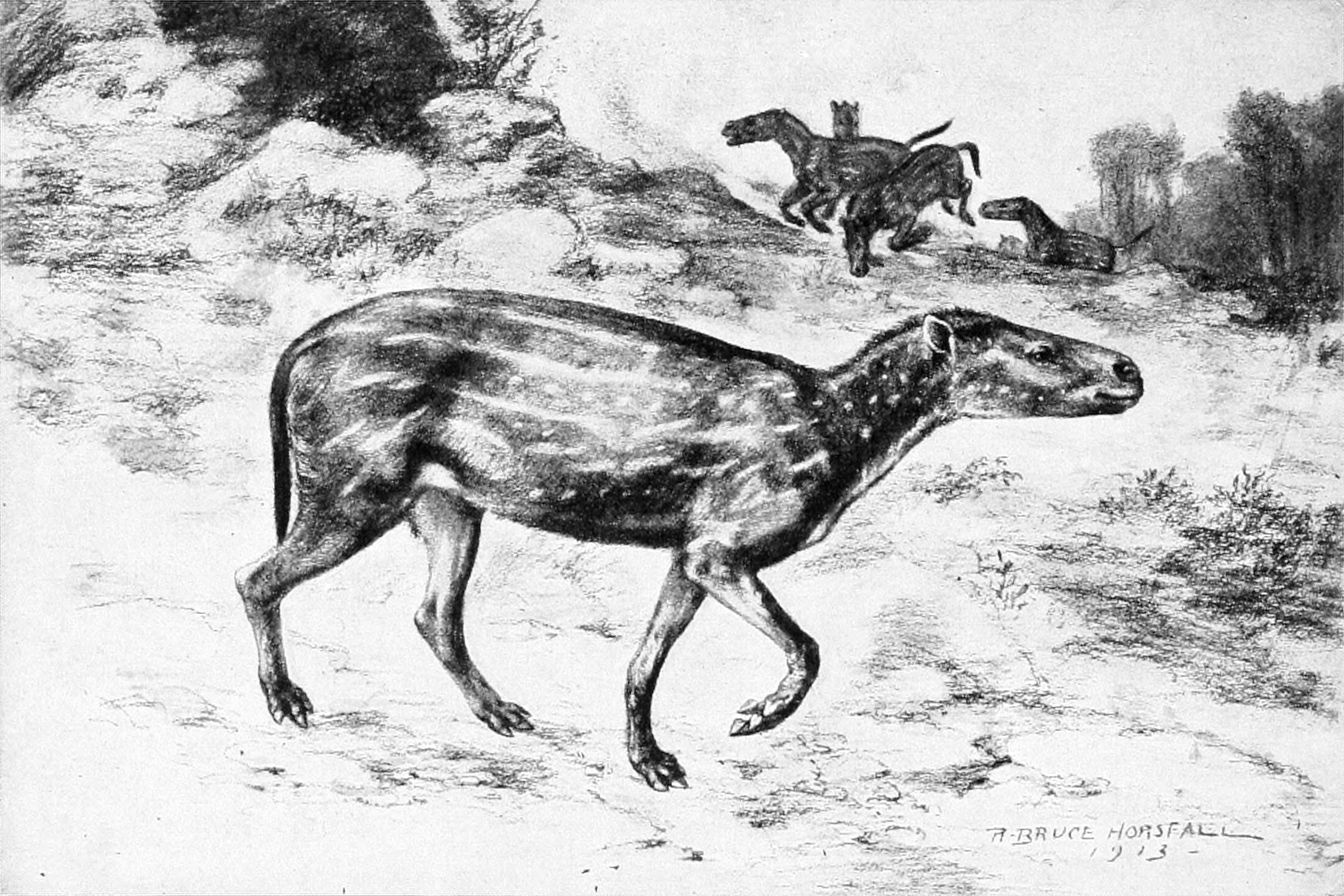
Restoration of H. eximius

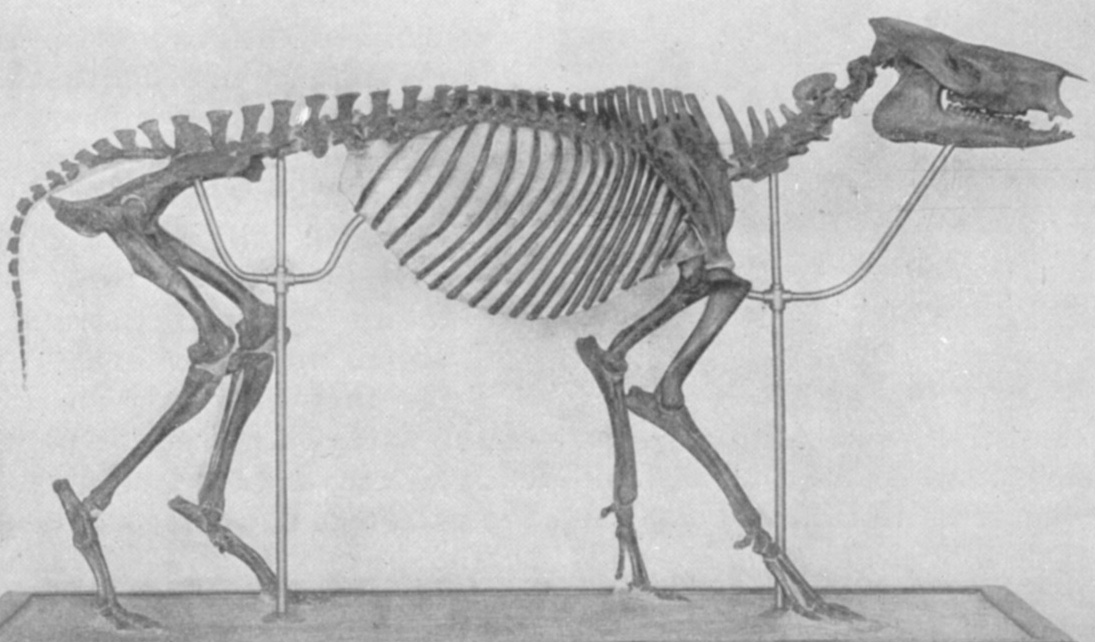
Skeleton of Hyrachyus
