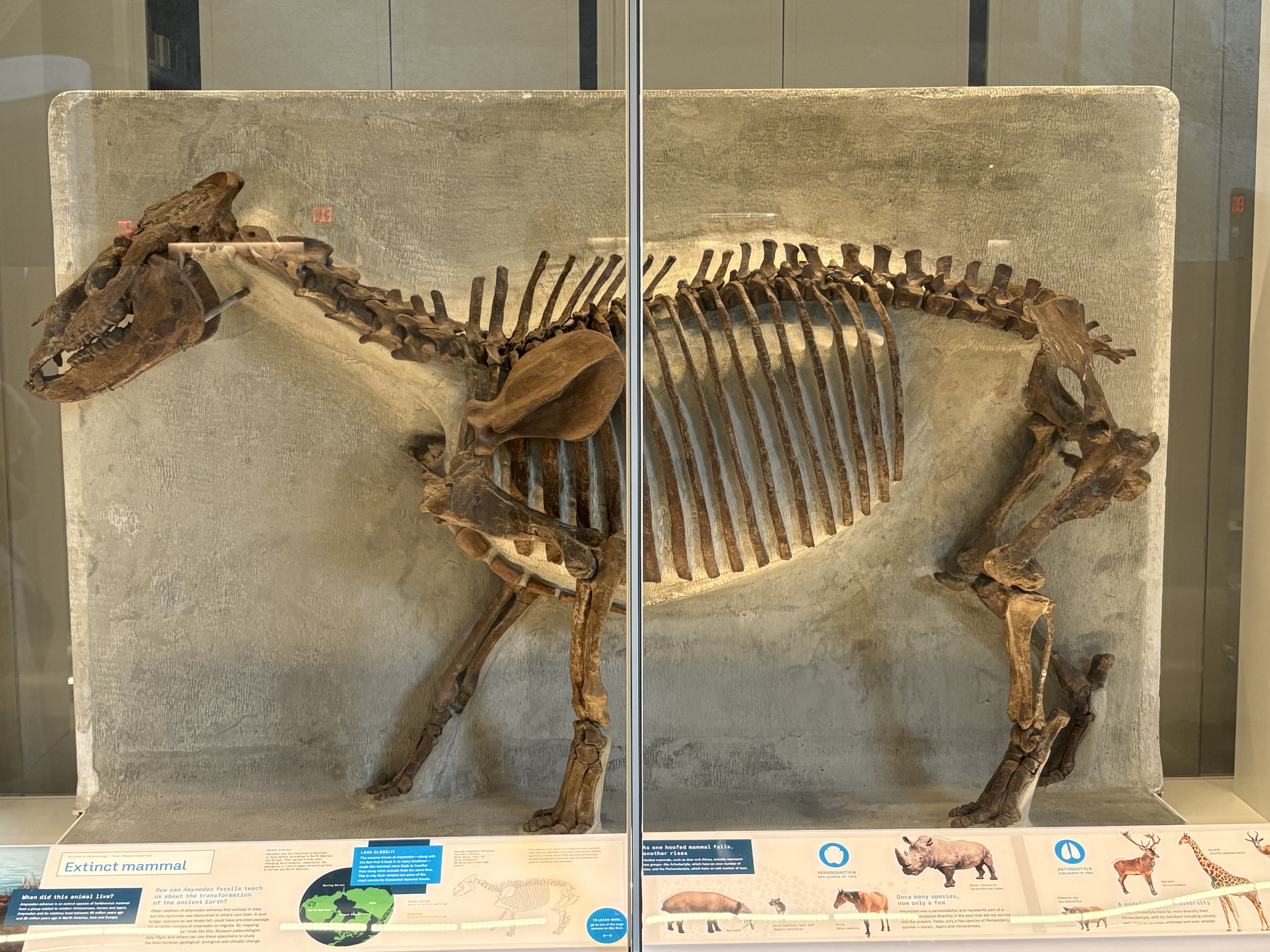
- Mounted skeleton of A. advenus, American Museum of Natural History

Scientific classification
- Kingdom: Animalia
- Phylum: Chordata
- Class: Mammalia
- Order: Perissodactyla
- Superfamily: Rhinocerotoidea
- Family: †Amynodontidae
- Genus: †Amynodon; Marsh, 1877

Type species
- †Diceratherium advenum (original combination) Marsh, 1875

Species
- †A. advenus (Marsh, 1875); See species of Amynodon for historically referred species

Synonyms
- Genus synonymy: Orthocynodon Scott & Osborn, 1882; Synonyms of A. advenus: Diceratherium advenum Marsh, 1875; Orthocynodon antiquus Scott & Osborn, 1882; A. antiquus (Scott & Osborn, 1882); A. intermedius Osborn, 1890; A. erectus Troxell, 1921

= Amynodon =

Amynodon Temporal range: Middle Eocene (late Bridgerian–late Uintan), 46.7–40.1 Ma

Extinct genus of mammals

Amynodon ("threatening tooth") is an extinct genus of amynodont that lived in North America during the Middle Eocene, from the late Bridgerian to the late Uintan land mammal age. Several species of Amynodon have been named historically but only the type species, A. advenus, is seen as valid today. Fossils of Amynodon have historically also been reported from Eurasia, though the genus is now generally considered to have been restricted to North America.

Amynodon is the type genus of the family Amynodontidae. It was a medium-sized member of the family, estimated to have weighed 589 kilograms (1,299 lb). Amynodon is the earliest known amynodont in North America, and was probably descended from Asian ancestors that migrated across Beringia. It was a characteristic animal of the Uintan land mammal age, sometimes treated as an index taxon. Amynodon was a relatively primitive and unspecialized, with teeth intermediate between those of more primtitive rhinocerotoids and more derived amynodonts. The canines of Amynodon took the form of semi-erect tusks, which were further developed in more advanced amynodonts.

Amynodon was historically interpreted as a semiaquatic animal, but reinterpretations in the 20th century argued that Amynodon does not preserve any obvious semiaquatic adaptations; such adaptations did evolve in amynodonts, but may have been restricted to the more derived metamynodontines, such as Metamynodon. Amynodon was instead interpreted as a terrestrial browser. The broad range of Amynodon across the modern-day United States further support to this idea, since this indicates that Amynodon was accustomed to the dominant environment type of the Uintan, savannas with open-canopied forests. Recent isotope analyses of Amynodon teeth have lent renewed support to the idea that it might have been semiaquatic.

== Research history ==
=== Description of A. advenus ===
Different fossils interpreted as type specimens of A. advenus

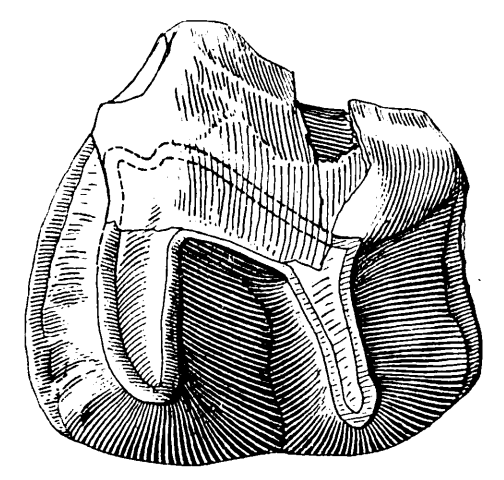
YPM 11763, an isolated third upper molar

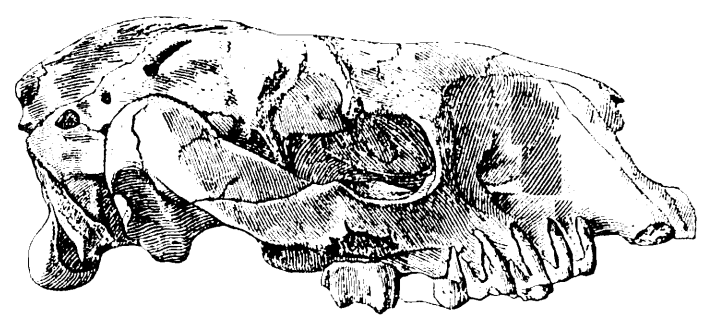
YPM 11453, a skull

Amynodon is the best represented amynodont in the fossil record. The first fossils of Amynodon were briefly reported by Othniel Charles Marsh in 1875 from the Uinta Basin (Uinta Formation) in Utah. Marsh recorded several fragmentary fossils, most notably an isolated upper P_{3} (third upper molar; YPM 11763) and a corresponding lower molar. Marsh believed that the fossils came from a true rhinoceros and named the new species Diceratherium advenum based on the material. The species was mainly based on the upper molar, for which Marsh provided measurements.

In 1877, Marsh named the new genus Amynodon based on a nearly complete skull (YPM 11453), also from the Uinta Formation in Utah. The type species was A. advenus, "which was provisionally referred to the genus Diceratherium when first described." Marsh believed the animal to be the earliest rhinoceros yet discovered, with a skull intermediate between rhinoceroses and tapirs but with molars entirely like those of rhinoceroses. Marsh's description was wrong on several anatomical details since the skull had not been removed from its matrix (surrounding rock) or properly put together before it was described.

Marsh did not designate a type specimen, a problem compounded by the use of different fossils to diagnose Diceratherium advenum in 1875 (YPM 11763) and Amynodon advenus in 1877 (YPM 11453). In 1890, Henry Fairfield Osborn interpreted YPM 11453 as the type specimen of A. advenus. In 1921, Edward Leffingwell Troxell instead interpreted the upper molar YPM 11763 as the type specimen. Later authors generally follow Troxell's assessment. In 1955, Jean Hough considered YPM 11453 to be a paratype specimen.

Marsh did not provide etymologies for the species name advenus or the genus name Amynodon. The American Museum of Natural History traces the etymology of Amynodon to the Greek amynos (to ward off or threaten) and odontos (tooth) and interprets the name as a reference to the large, tusk-like canines. The species name advenus is Latin and can refer to a foreigner or stranger, something that is foreign or strange, or someone who is a stranger to a specific thing (i.e. inexperienced).

=== Additional fossils and proposed species ===
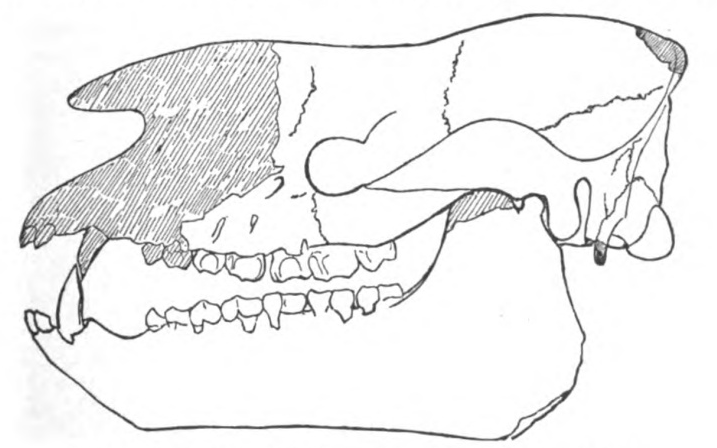
Scott and Osborn's reconstruction of the skull PU 10047, type specimen of "Orthocynodon antiquus"

In 1882, William Berryman Scott and Osborn described the new genus and species Orthocynodon antiquus, based on an associated skull and lower jaw (PU 10047), and another partial skull, found in the Washakie Formation in Wyoming. Scott and Osborn distinguished O. antiquus from A. advenus by several dental features, and noted that it was from the Bridgerian, and thus earlier in age than Marsh's A. advenus fossils. In 1883, Scott and Osborn described O. antiquus in more detail and established the new family Amynodontidae to contain Orthocynodon and Amynodon. Orthocynodon was named before YPM 11453 had been fully prepared out of its matrix; once Scott and Osborn examined the prepared YPM 11453, they realized that much of the distinguishing features did not apply, and Orthocynodon was designated as a junior synonym of Amynodon, with A. antiquus then treated as a species of the latter.

Osborn described another species in 1890, A. intermedius, based on a third partial Amynodon skull (PU 10309), from the Uinta Formation. The new species was distinguished by its larger size, and dental features. In 1895, Osborn reported the discovery of a relatively complete Amynodon skeleton in the Uinta Formation, which he referred to A. intermedius. Osborn appears to never have figured this skeleton. Earl Douglass described a poorly preserved jaw (CM 734) in 1903, from Sage Creek in Montana. Douglass referred the jaw to Metamynodon but Horace Elmer Wood identified it as Amynodon, possibly a new species, in 1934. According to Wood, CM 734 is more advanced than A. antiquus and similar in size to A. intermedius, but distinguished by having one less pair of upper incisors. In 1910, Walter W. Granger reported a new Amynodon skull (AMNH 14601) from Beaver Divide in Wyoming. Walter initially referred the skull to A. antiquus but later changed his mind to A. advenus. Elmer S. Riggs reported new Amynodon fossils from the Uinta Basin in 1912 but did not describe them. The fossils found by Riggs included a skull (FMNH 12184) and a lower jaw (FMNH 12191), which were later referred to A. advenus. In 1919, Olof August Peterson reported Amynodon fossils from the Uinta Basin, from several individuals. Peterson referred the fossils to both A. advenus and A. intermedius, almost entirely based on size.

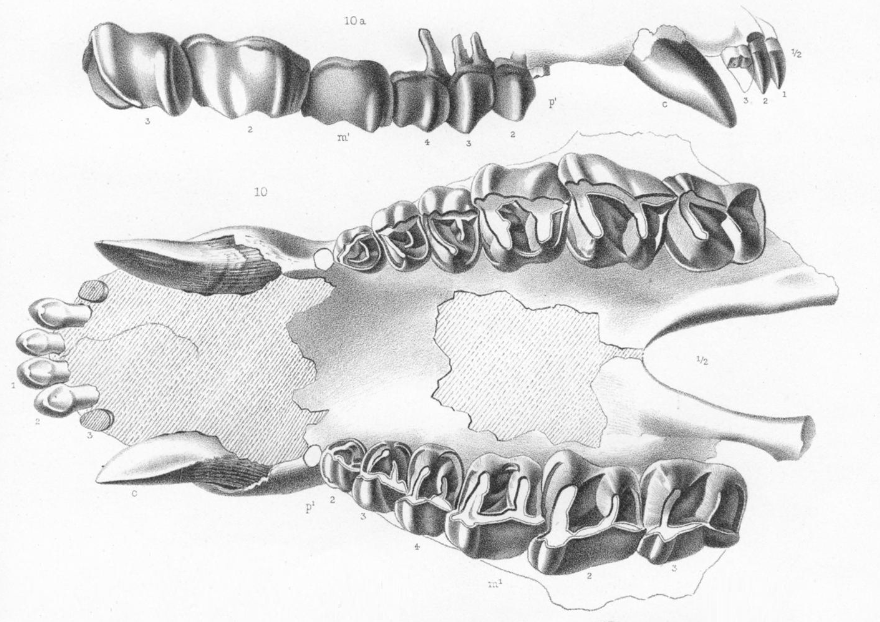
Illustration of the partial skull PU 10309, type specimen of "Amynodon intermedius"

In 1921, Troxell suggested that YPM 11453 was distinct from YPM 11763 on the species level, based on features in the third upper premolar (since nothing else is preserved in YPM 11763). Since Troxell interpreted YPM 11763 as the type specimen of A. advenus, he moved YPM 11453 to a new species, A. erectus. In 1939, Chester Stock described the new species Amynodon reedi, from the Friars Formation in California, based on the fragmentary left maxilla LACM (CIT) 314/2529. Stock also reported an Amynodon tooth, possibly A. advenus, from the Sespe Formation in California. David J. Golz and Jason A. Lillegraven reported additional Californian Amynodon fossils in 1977, from the Santiago Formation and referred these to A. intermedius.

In 1981, John Andrew Wilson and Judith Schiebout described a large number of Amynodon fossils from Uintan-age strata at Pruett Tuff in the Buck Hill Group of Brewster County, Texas. Wilson and Schiebout referred the fossils to A. advenus. As the largest published sample of Amynodon from a single population, the assemblage allowed Wilson and Schiebout to study the degree of individual variation in a single Amynodon species. High variability was observed in several features, and they determined that the fossils previously assigned to A. antiquus, A. erectus, A. advenus, and A. intermedius showed less variability than the single-population sample from Texas, despite being from different sites and slightly different stratigraphic levels (early/late Uintan). Wilson and Schiebout thus suggested that A. antiquus, A. erectus, and A. intermedius were all synonyms of A. advenus.

William P. Wall revised Amynodon in 1982. Wall recognized only A. advenus and A. reedi as valid, and agreed with Wilson and Schiebout's assessment that A. antiquus, A. erectus, and A. intermedius are junior synonyms of A. advenus. Wall pointed out that Wilson and Schiebout had made some mathematical errors in their analysis; contrary to their calculations, the Texan Amynodon sample shows less variability than the total sample. The species other than A. advenus were instead reassessed by Wall individually. Wall assessed the differences used to separate A. erectus to be minor, and within the range of variation in A. advenus. The supposedly distinguishing features of A. antiquus were found to be due to misinterpretations of the fossils, and those of A. intermedius were found to be problematic, based on parts of the fossils that were reconstructed, sometimes with plaster. Wall recognized only A. advenus and A. reedi as valid species. In 2018, Jérémy Tissier et al. recovered A. reedi as only distantly related to A. advenus in a phylogenetic analysis, and thus concluded that A. reedi was not a species of Amynodon. A. reedi was instead recovered as close to Zaisanamynodon.

Several species of Amynodon have been named based on fossils found in East Asia. The best known Asian species, A. mongoliensis, was reclassified as part of a distinct genus by Miklós Kretzoi in 1942, Sharamynodon, though numerous more poorly known species are yet to be reassessed. In his revision of Amynodon, Wall restricted the use of Amynodon to fossils from North America. As Amynodon is currently understood, the Asian or European species do thus not belong to the genus. Wall recommended that the Asian material should be treated as Amynodontidae incertae sedis, but believed some of the fossils may belong to Sharamynodon. Detailed reexaminations of most of the Asian fossils are still necessary. A single species of Amynodon has also been named based on fossils from Europe: "A. hungaricus", based on a fragmentary mandible from Hungary. Kretzoi, who described A. hungaricus, later considered its fossils to be "defective".

== Description ==
A. advenus was a medium-sized amynodont; the precise size varies considerably between fossil specimens. A. advenus is estimated to have had a mean body mass of 589 kilograms (1,299 lb).

=== Skull ===
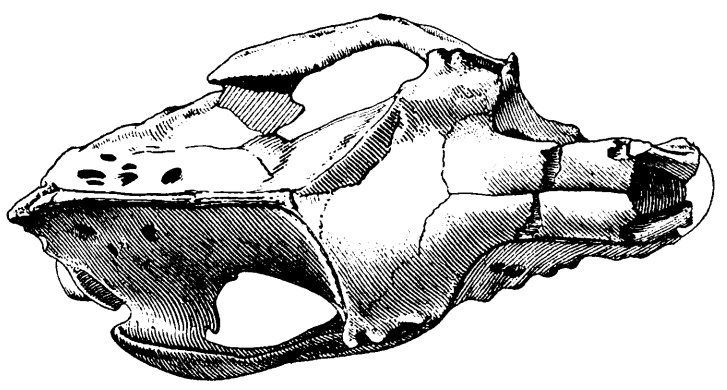
Top view of YPM 11453

Skull size varies between Amynodon specimens. PU 10057 is 44 centimeters (17 in) long and YPM 11453 is 35 centimeters (14 in) long. 41576-19, one of the skulls described by Wilson and Schiebout in 1981, is 51 centimeters (20 in) long. The skull of Amynodon was relatively dolichocephalic (long relative to its width); the skull was about as wide as 49–54% of its length. This sets Amynodon apart from more derived amynodonts. In metamynodontines, the skull is brachycephalic (wide relative to its length) due to enlarged zygomatic arches, with the width ranging between 55–70% of the skull length. In cadurcodontines, the skull is even more dolichocephalic, only about 45–50% as wide as it is long.

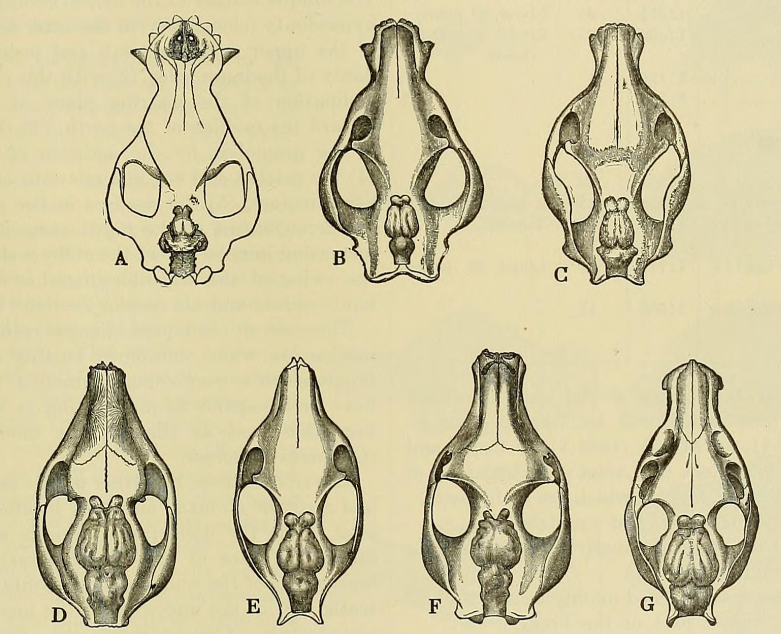
Skulls and relative braincase sizes of various Eocene perissodactyls. F, in the bottom row, is Amynodon advenus.

Cadurcodontine amynodonts have a noticeably higher skull, and metamynodontines have elevated eye orbits; neither of these traits are present in Amynodon. The zygomatic arches did not have any noteworthy adaptations, contrary to those of caducodontines (reduced in height and thickness) and metamynodontines (increased in size). The premaxillae are not thickened or fused with each other, as in some more derived amynodonts, but the premaxillae extend relatively far back, below the nasal bones. Extensive contact between the premaxillae and nasals such as this is a primitive trait, seen in more primitive rhinocerotoids but not in more derived amynodonts. Amynodon had large preorbital fossae (grooves in front of the eye orbits).

A major trend observed in amynodont evolution is the shortening of the snout compared to more primitive rhinocerotoids; this is observed in Amynodon, which had a shorter snout than the more basal amynodont Rostriamynodon, but a longer snout than all more derived amynodonts. The nasal bones of Amynodon were relatively long, and the nasal incision extends back above the diastema (gap) between the canines and cheek teeth. The frontal sinuses of Amynodon were not as large as they were in the cadurcodontines.

The occiput of the skull was relatively narrow, and there is a distinct post-orbital constriction (constriction of the skull behind the eye orbits), due to Amynodon's small braincase. The skull had a well-developed sagittal crest.

=== Dentition ===
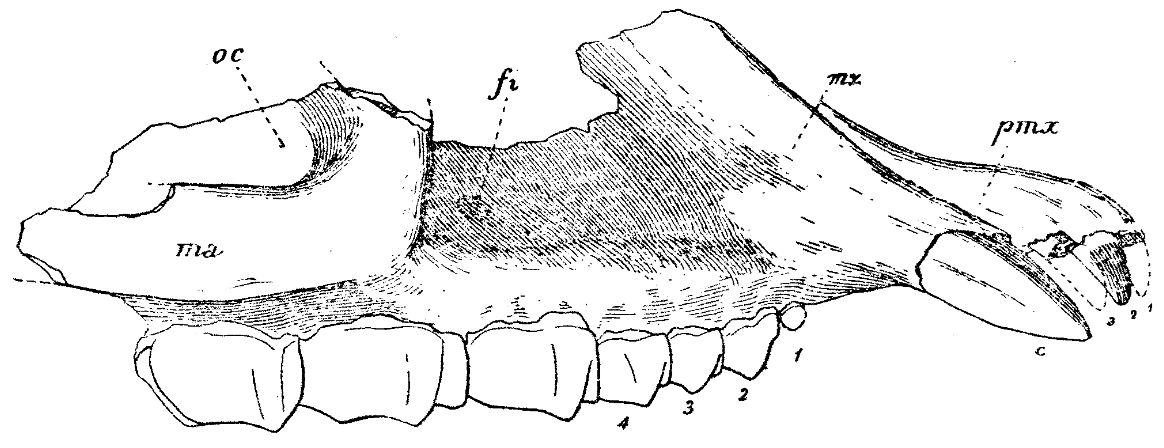
Side view of PU 10309

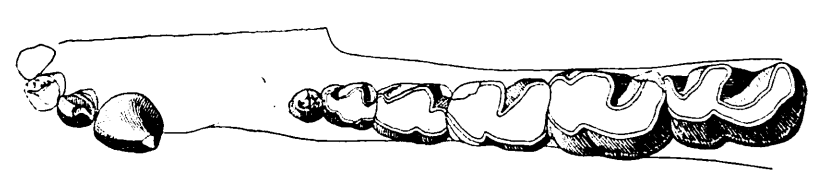
Top view of the lower jaw associated with YPM 11453

Amynodon had the dental formula 3.1.3.33.1.3.3, i.e. both the lower and upper jaws had three pairs of incisors, one pair of canines, three pairs of premolars, and three pairs of molars. The dentition of Amynodon is similar to primitive rhinocerotoids such as Heptodon and Hyrachyus, and is primitive when compared to later amynodonts. The teeth nevertheless demonstrate the early beginnings of evolutionary trends later observed among the amynodonts, including that the canines were enlarged, that the premolars had decreased in importance, and that there was an increased emphasis on shearing by the ectolophs of the molars and a corresponding simplification of the crosslophs of the molars (the ectoloph and crossloph being two prominent ridges on the surface of the molar).

The incisors and canines were relatively primitive in Amynodon, and the retention of three pairs of upper and lower incisors is a primitive trait. The incisors of Amynodon are more conical than in Heptodon and Hyrachyus, and vary in relative size between individuals; in some Amynodon, both the upper and lower I_{2} is larger than the other incisors. The canines of Amynodon were moderately-sized semi-erect tusks, clearly larger than in more primitive rhinocerotoids but smaller than in many more derived amynodonts. The lower canines were positioned in front of the upper canines. In most Amynodon skulls, there is a short diastema (gap) in the upper jaw between I_{3} and the canine, to accommodate the lower canine. This diastema is a derived trait in amynodonts, not present in more primitive rhinocerotoids. In some specimens, this diastema is not present, and the lower canine preserves a wear pattern caused by contact with I_{3}. The canines–premolar diastema is longer in Amynodon than in more derived amynodonts, but relatively shorter than in Hyrachyus and Heptodon due to the reduced length of the snout.

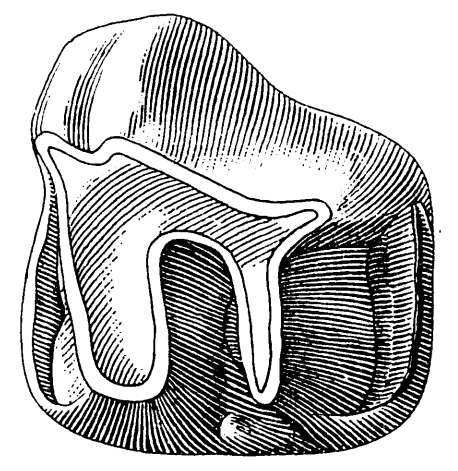
The upper M_{3} (third molar) of YPM 11453, showing its vaguely quadratic outline

Amynodon had low-crowned cheek teeth. The upper premolar series of Amynodon was relatively short, only about half the length of the upper molar series, but still relatively longer than in more derived amynodonts. The upper P_{2} was relatively small, with its long axis oriented posteriolingually (backwards and towards the tongue). The protoloph (an internal ridge joining the cusps together) of the upper P_{2} is angled sharply to the back, and there is usually a small metaloph (another ridge). The hypocone (a cusp in the corner of the tooth) is either missing or small in the upper P_{2}. The upper P_{3} is larger and more complex than the P_{2}, and its long axis is less posteriolingually oriented than in P_{2}. The P_{3} had a large parastyle, an anterior rib, and a small posterior rib along its ectoloph. In most known P_{3} there was also a lingual cingulum. The upper P_{4} was relatively large, taking up about 42% of the length of the premolar series. In most other amynodonts, this tooth is relatively smaller. The P_{4} had anterior and posterior ribs more developed than those of the other cheek teeth, as well as a developed parastyle. The metaloph of P_{4} was distinct from the proloph, and relatively larger than the metaloph of P_{3}. The molars do not have distinct crochets (a crest on the metaloph) or crichets (a crest on the ectoloph), and only sometimes an antecrochet (a crest on the protoloph). The upper M_{2} is larger than the M_{1}, though these teeth are otherwise similar. The parastyles of the upper molars were relatively small, but larger than in more derived amynodonts. Developments of the cusps and ridges of the upper M_{3} gave the tooth a somewhat quadratic outline; this is feature unique to amynodonts, which separates them from all other rhinocerotoids.

The lower premolar series was shortened, similar to the upper one, about 45–50% the length of the lower molar series. The lower P_{2} is relatively large and double-rooted. In other amynodonts, P2 is either much smaller (Sharamynodon), only sometimes there (Amynodontopsis), or completely lost (Cadurcodon). Most of the lower P_{2} was taken up by the protoconid (the most prominent cusp) but the P_{2} also had a small paralophid, small protolophid, and small talonid (the other cusps). The lower P_{3} was much larger than the P_{2}. In the P_{3}, the other cusps were enlarged but the protoconid was still dominant. The lower P_{4} had an even smaller protoconid, though it was still the largest cusp. P_{4} also had a well-developed paraconid, and distinct trigonid and talonid basins (depressions, for the cusps of the upper teeth). Both the lower P_{3} and lower P_{4} were submolariform, i.e. somewhat similar to molars. All of the lower molars were relatively broad, though M_{3} was relatively narrower than the others, and they increased in size from front to back.

=== Postcranial skeleton ===
The postcranial skeleton of Amynodon has not been described at the same level of detail as the skull or dentition. The centra of the vertebrae of Amynodon were relatively small. The anterior (forwards) dorsal vertebrae had long and slender spines. The humerus of Amynodon was similar in length to the femur, and very broad. The ulna and radius were long and slender. The hip bones were elongated and slender, the pubis was short, and the ischium was long. Like other amynodonts, Amynodon had four toes on their manus (front feet) and three on their pes (hind feet), a primitive condition among perissodactyls. The metapodials (long bones) of the manus were longer than the metapodials of the pes, and all were relatively slender. The third metacarpal was the longest of the metacarpal bones, but not by much.

== Classification and evolution ==
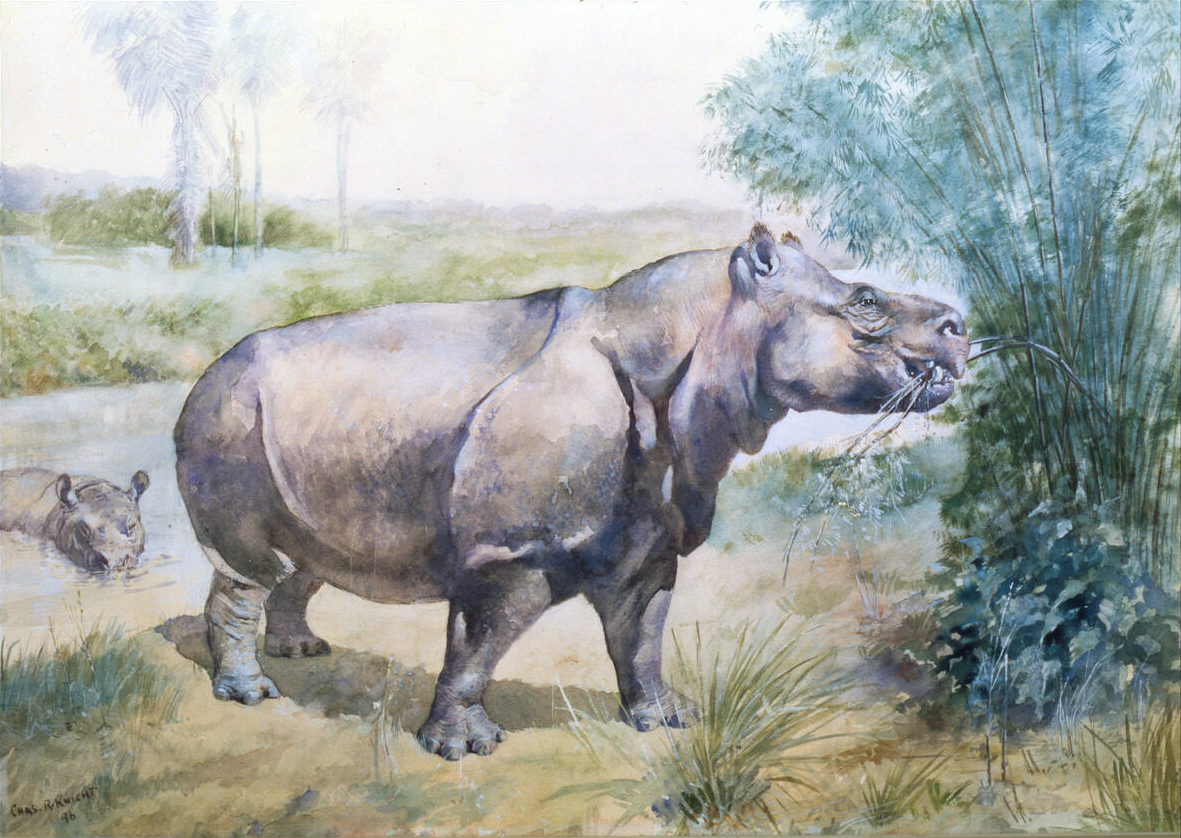
Later North American amynodonts, such as Metamynodon (pictured), may not have been descended from Amynodon, since their closest known relatives are known from outside North America

When Amynodon fossils were discovered, they were initially interpreted as the remains of very early true rhinoceroses (Rhinocerotidae). Marsh described the fossils as such in 1875 and 1877, and Scott and Osborn initially believed them to represent rhinoceroses as well. Amynodon was placed in its own family, Amynodontidae, by Scott and Osborn in 1883, but was still believed to be an animal on the path to modern rhinoceroses. Amynodon is the type genus of Amynodontidae. The description of Metamynodon by Scott and Osborn in 1887 challenged the idea that Amynodon was a predecessor of modern rhinoceroses. In 1890, Osborn opinioned that Metamynodon was "certainly far from the rhinoceros line" and yet "undoubtedly a successor" to Amynodon. The discovery of Metamynodon prompted Osborn to suggest that amynodonts represented a parallel lineage of "pseudo-rhinoceroses" that were not ancestral to any modern forms. The precise relationship between amynodonts and other rhinocerotoids remains disputed and recent analyses do not reach a consensus on rhinocerotoid relations. Amynodonts have been recovered both as the sister group of paraceratheres, or in a more basal position as the sister group of the clade containing eggyosodonts, paraceratheres, and rhinocerotids.

Both the anatomy and age of Amynodon place it as a relatively primitive amynodont. Amynodon is the earliest known amynodont from North America and was probably descended from Asian ancestors that migrated across Beringia, given that earlier and more basal amynodonts, such as Rostriamynodon, are known from Asia. Several features of Amynodon show primitive states compared to more derived amynodonts, though it is also noticeably more derived than Rostriamynodon. The preorbital (in front of the eyes) portion of the skull in A. advenus is reduced to about 40 or 35% of the skull, compared to 42% in Rostriamynodon. The contact between the nasal bones and premaxilla is relatively short, and the width of M_{3} in A. advenus ranges from 49 to 55% of its length, compared to 58% in Rostriamynodon. All more advanced amynodonts were more derived in these features.

Wall divided the amynodonts into two subfamilies: Rostriamynodontinae (including only Rostriamynodon) and Amynodontinae (all other amynodonts). Inside Amynodontinae, Wall placed Amynodon into its own tribe, Amynodontini, as the sister taxon of the more derived amynodont tribes Cadurcodontini and Metamynodontini. More recent approaches to amynodont classification have not retained all of Wall's clades (e.g. "Rostriamynodontinae", "Amynodontinae", "Amynodontini") but support Wall's derived clades Cadurcodontini and Metamynodontini. Later authors generally group all non-cadurcodontines and non-metamynodontines (including Amynodon) merely as "early diverging amynodontids".

The cladogram below presents the results of a phylogenetic analysis by Veine-Tonizzo et al. (2023), showing the basal position of Amynodon:

- Amynodontidae
  - Rostriamynodon grangeri
  - - Amynodon advenus
    - - Sharamynodon mongoliensis
      - - Metamynodontini
          - - Paramynodon birmanicus
            - Megalamynodon regalis
          - - Sellamynodon zimborensis
            - Metamynodon planifrons
        - Cadurcodontini
          - - Zaisanamynodon protheroi
            - Zaisanamynodon borisovi
          - - - - Amynodontopsis bodei
                - Amynodontopsis jiyuanensis
              - - Cadurcotherium cayluxi
                - Cadurcotherium minus
            - - Cadurcodon bahoensis
              - - Cadurcodon maomingensis
                - - Cadurcodon ardynensis
                  - Cadurcodon kazakademius

In the latest Uintan, several new amynodont genera appeared in North America (Amynodontopsis, Megalamynodon, and Metamynodon). It is not clear if Amynodon was ancestral to these forms, since most of them had closer known relatives and sister taxa in Asia. There were probably several amynodont dispersal events, where new forms migrated across Beringia between Asia and North America.

== Paleobiology ==
Historically, Amynodon was interpreted as a semiaquatic animal, similar to the later amynodont Metamynodon. In the late 20th century, William P. Wall argued that this was a misinterpretation, and that Amynodon fossils do not show any traits or adaptations that would suggest a semiaquatic lifestyle. Metamynodon had several adaptations similar to modern hippopotamuses, such as eyes positioned high on the skull and reduced neural spines, which Amynodon lack. Wall instead interpreted Amynodon as a terrestrial browser, and as a sub-cursorial to mediportal (cursorial means an animal that is adapted to run, whereas mediportal means an animal that is adapted to walk with moderate speed) animal.

Oxygen isotope analyses of Amynodon tooth enamel in 2024 revealed relatively low δ^{18}O values. When compared to fossils from the same sites, Amynodon had lower values than contemporary brontotheres, such as Telmatherium, and was numerically close to garfish scales. This data has lent renewed support to the idea that Amynodon spent considerable amounts of time in or near water, and that it might have been semiaquatic, albeit not as specialized as Metamynodon.

== Paleoecology ==
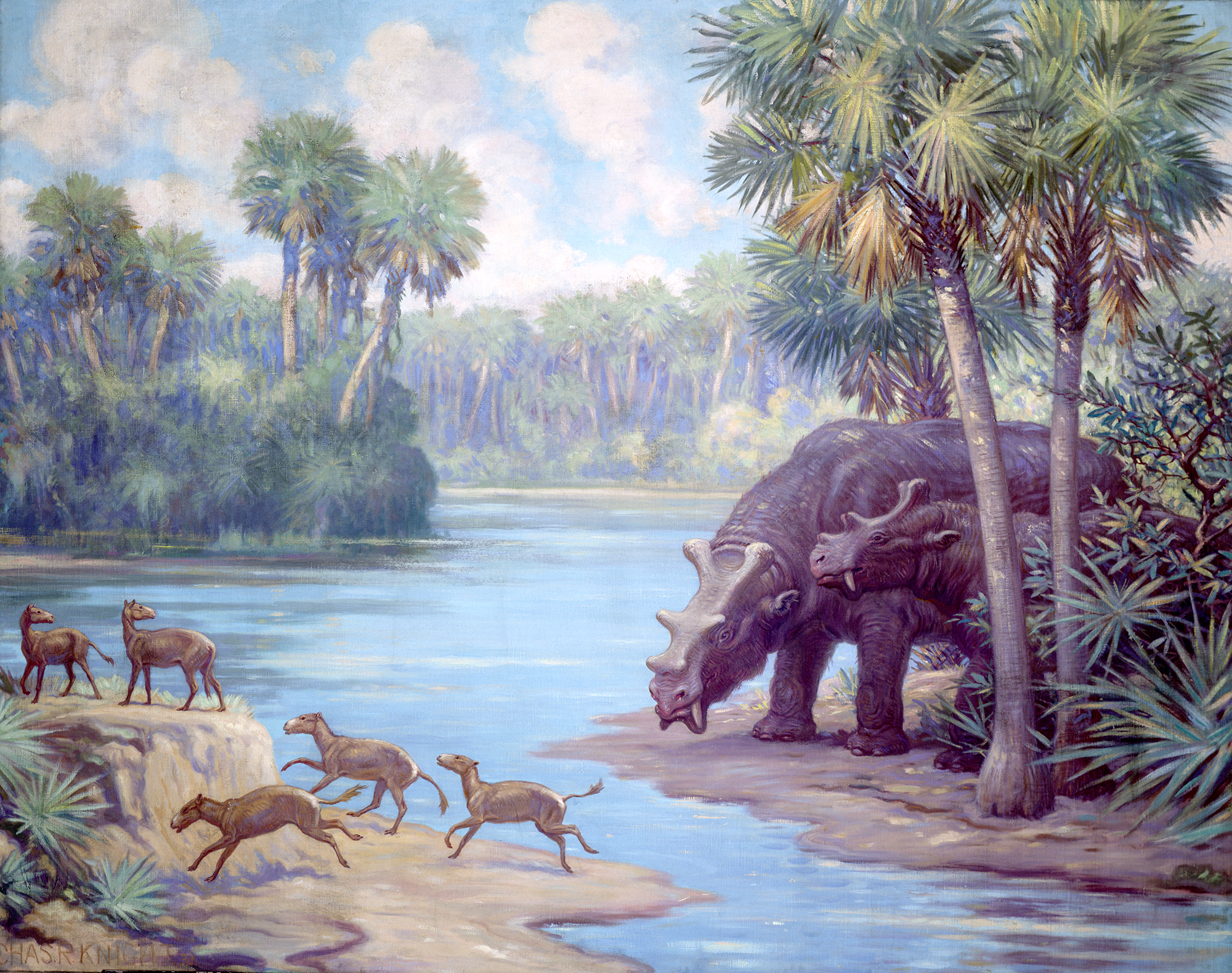
Early Uintan river landscape painted by Charles R. Knight, with Orohippus (left) and Uintatherium (right)

Amynodon advenus had a relatively long geologic range, first appearing in the late Bridgerian and persisting through the entire Uintan. Amynodon is sometimes treated as an index taxon of the Uintan. Amynodon also had a relatively wide geographic distribution; fossils are known from the western interior of North America, the Pacific Coast, and the Gulf Coast. Amynodon is not known from Canada, not even from Uintan localities that preserve other typical Uintan mammals. The lack of Amynodon in the north may be due to some environmental factor. The northernmost record of Amynodon is from the Kishenehn Formation in Montana.

The Eocene was a time of great environmental changes across the world. During the Middle Eocene, the global climate experienced a trend of global cooling. In the Uintan, much of the land of North America was dominated by savannas with open-canopied forests. Over the course of the Bridgerian and Uintan, the climate changed from tropical/subtropical to sparser open-country communities. The large geographic range of Amynodon suggests that it was accustomed to the Uintan savannas and forests, which dominated much of the North American landscape. Wall considered this to be additional evidence against Amynodon being semiaquatic.

There were great faunal changes in North America during the Bridgerian and Uintan, During the Bridgerian, new perissodactyl groups (mainly brontotheres and hyracodonts) grew to dominate among large-bodied mammals, while primates (in particular the omomyids), and archaic groups of rodents were the dominant small-bodied mammals. In the Uintan, new perissodactyl groups became more prominent, such as the amynodonts, and there was also a greater number of artiodactyls, such as agriochoerids, camelids, oromerycids, and protoceratids. Several archaic groups were still present in the Uintan, such as hyopsodontids and dinoceratans, but they were on the decline. Primates were also declining in North America during the Uintan, as were the rodent groups that had been dominant in the Bridgerian, which gave way to new rodent groups and lagomorphs. The dominant groups of predators of Middle Eocene North America were hyaenodonts, mesonychians, oxyaenodonts, and primitive carnivoramorphs. There was a general trend of decreasing predator diversity over the course of the Bridgerian to late Uintan.
