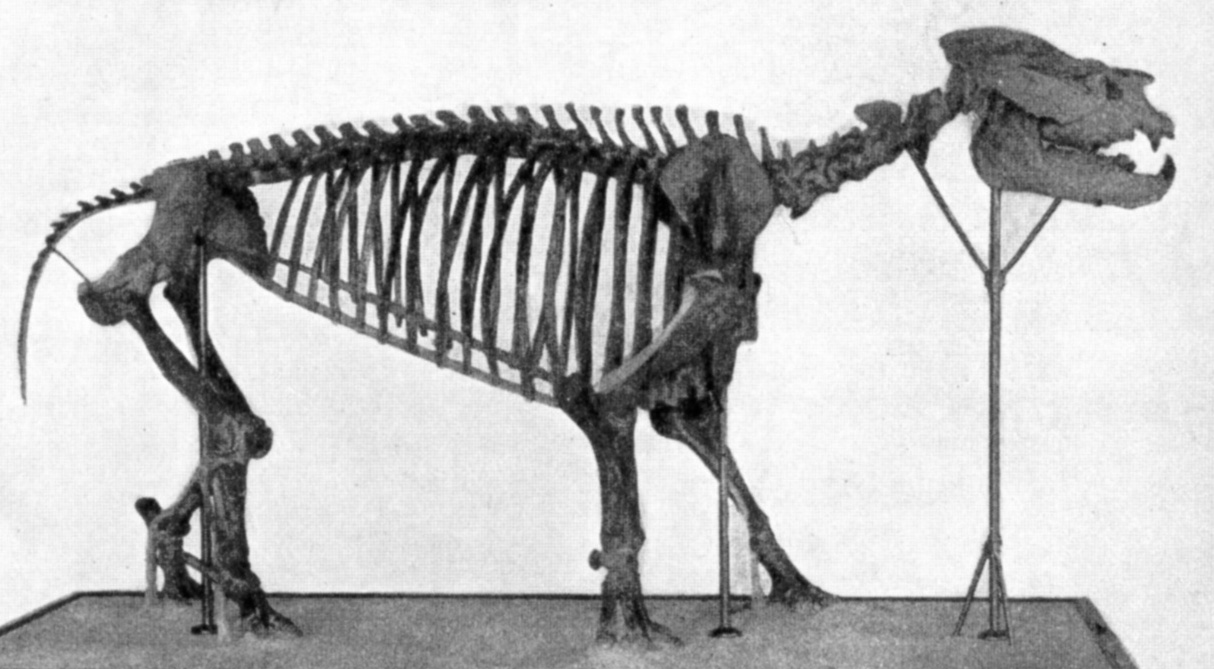
- 1920s photograph of a mounted M. planifrons skeleton on display at the American Museum of Natural History

Scientific classification
- Kingdom: Animalia
- Phylum: Chordata
- Class: Mammalia
- Order: Perissodactyla
- Superfamily: Rhinocerotoidea
- Family: †Amynodontidae
- Tribe: †Metamynodontini
- Genus: †Metamynodon; Scott & Osborn, 1887

Type species
- †Metamynodon planifrons Scott & Osborn, 1887

Other species
- †M. chadronensis? Wood, 1937; †M. mckinneyi? Wilson & Schiebout, 1981

Synonyms
- Genus synonymy: Cadurcopsis Kretzoi, 1942; Synonyms of M. planifrons: M. rex Troxell, 1921; Cadurcopsis dakotana Kretzoi, 1942

= Metamynodon =

Metamynodon Temporal range: Middle Eocene–Middle Oligocene (late Uintan–Whitneyan), 42.8–30 Ma

Extinct genus of mammals

Metamynodon ("after Amynodon") is an extinct genus of amynodont that lived in North America from the Middle Eocene to the Middle Oligocene. Metamynodon was a large, robust, and semiaquatic animal that displayed a suite of adaptations towards an amphibious lifestyle. Many of these features showcase convergent evolution with the modern hippopotamus, though Metamynodon is most closely related to rhinoceroses.

Fossils of Metamynodon were first discovered in the late 20th century. The type species of Metamynodon, M. planifrons, is known from near-complete fossils and is thus relatively well understood anatomically. Two additional species based on more fragmentary remains are often recognized, M. chadronensis and M. mckinneyi, though their taxonomic validity has been questioned since the 1980s. M. planifrons was the largest species, about the same size as large modern rhinoceroses. The largest M. planifrons measured up to 4.3 metres (14 ft) long and weighed about 1,800 kilograms (4,000 lb). The skull of Metamynodon was broad and flat. Dentally, it was characterized by large and tusk-like canines, and high-crowned cheek teeth. The body was stout and barrel-shaped, and the legs were relatively short.

Metamynodon likely inhabited river systems across much of North America. It was a grazer, possibly adapted to grind down abrasive vegetation. Metamynodon is recorded from the late Uintan to the Whitneyan land mammal age, and was most common in the Orellan, which corresponds to the Early Oligocene. Although dwarfed by brontotheres in the Eocene, Metamynodon was the largest mammal in North America during the Early Oligocene.

== Research history ==
=== Discovery of M. planifrons ===
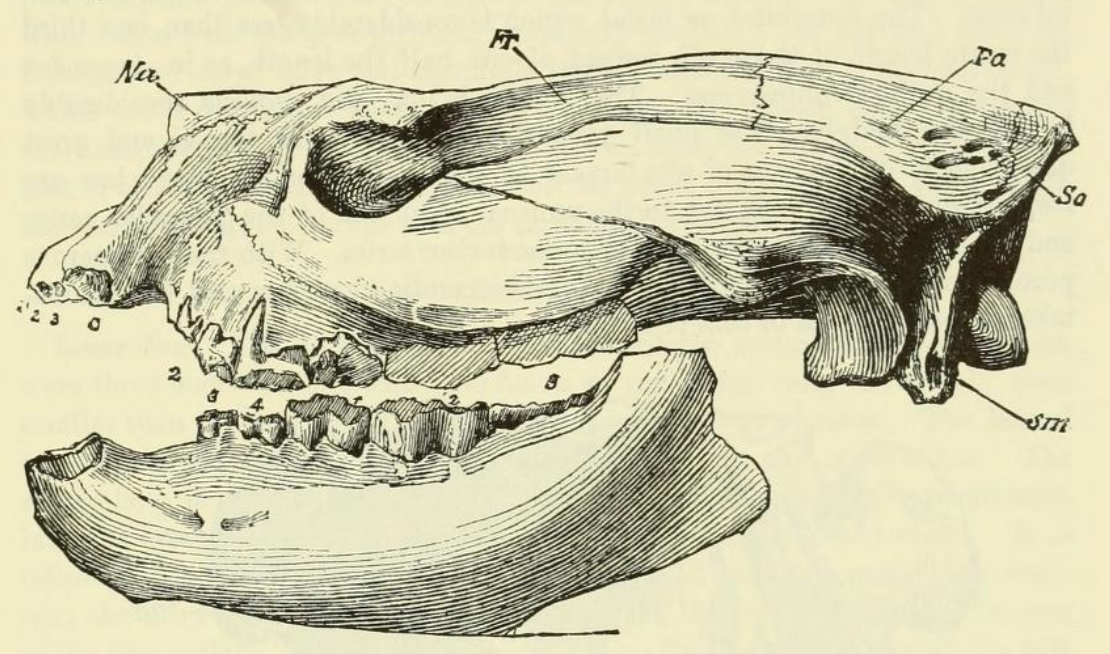
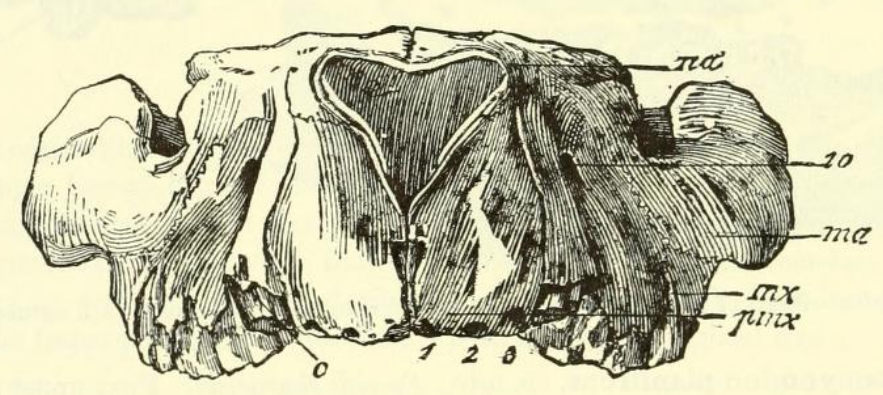
MCZ 9157, the type skull of M. planifrons, illustrated by R. Weber (1887)

Metamynodon planifrons was described by William Berryman Scott and Henry Fairfield Osborn in 1887, based on a skull and jaws found in the White River Formation. The fossils were among a large number of mammal fossils found by Samuel Garman in Nebraska and Dakota. The original Metamynodon fossils were found by Garman in 1880–1881 in the Big Badlands of South Dakota. Garman's fossils were entrusted to Scott and Osborn by Louis Agassiz for preparation and description.

The type specimen of M. planifrons is the well-preserved skull MCZ 9157. The teeth of MCZ 9157 are badly damaged, and the skull completely lacks the canines and incisors. Scott and Osborn also described two fossil jaw rami: a left ramus tentatively associated with MCZ 9157 (and thus also numbered MCZ 9157) and the right ramus MCZ 11931, which belongs to a different individual and is considered a paratype specimen. Scott and Osborn's original description was unclear in which lower jaw specimens were used for the diagnosis, and their description of the dentition was almost entirely conjectural since the teeth are damaged. A slightly amended description of the fossils was published in 1960 by Horace Elmer Wood. All of the original M. planifrons fossils are kept at the Museum of Comparative Zoology at Harvard University.

Scott and Osborn identified Metamynodon as a "highly modified successor" of Amynodon, which had been described a decade earlier. The name Metamynodon means "after Amynodon". Amynodon had for the previous decade been considered a predecessor of modern rhinoceroses, and perhaps the earliest known true rhinoceros (i.e. the family Rhinocerotidae), an idea challenged by the discovery of Metamynodon. In 1890. Osborn opinioned that Metamynodon was "certainly far from the rhinoceros line" and yet "undoubtedly a successor" to Amynodon. Osborn deduced that amynodonts represented a parallel lineage of "pseudo-rhinoceroses" that were not ancestral to any modern forms.

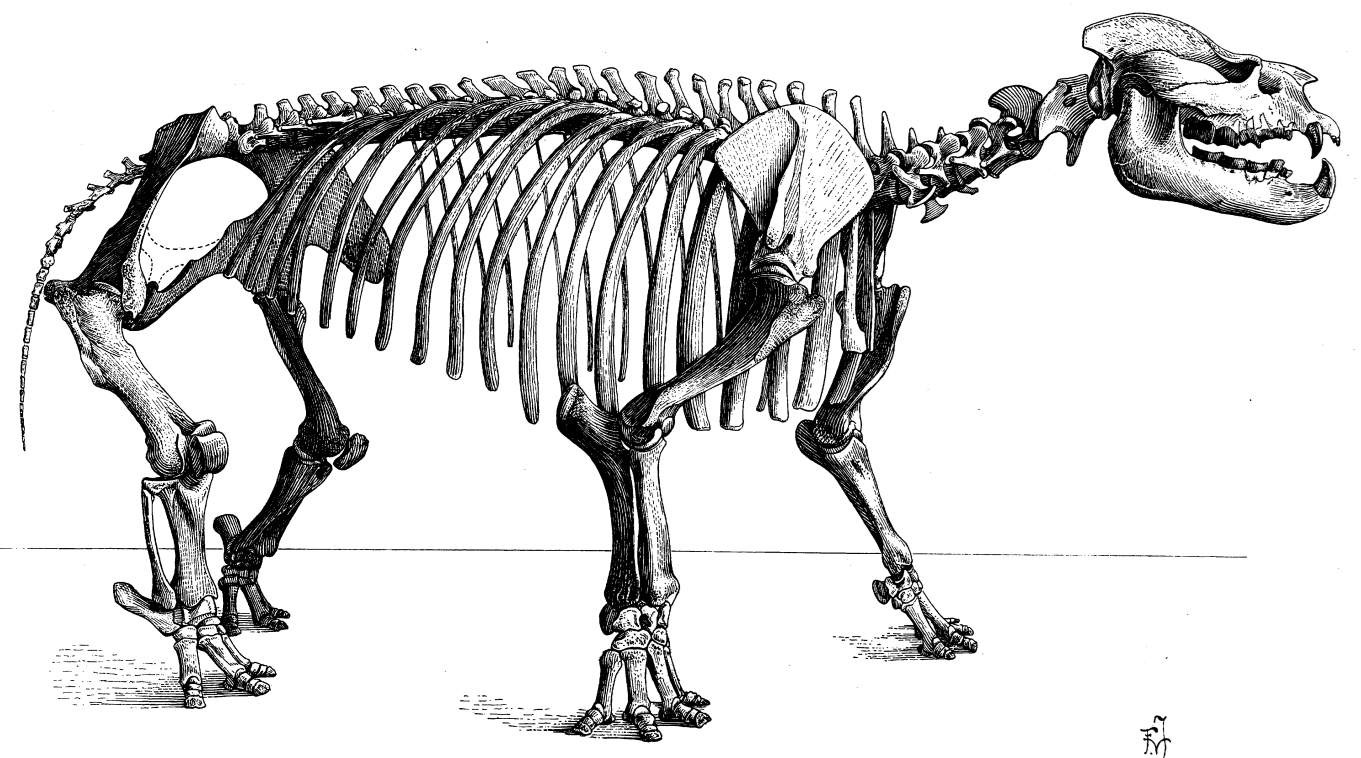
Illustration of the skeleton of M. planifrons by R. Weber (1895)

In 1892, an expedition from the American Museum of Natural History found additional M. planifrons fossils in the White River Formation. The most significant new fossils included a relatively well-preserved skeleton, which included the jaw but only fragments of the skull (AMNH 546), as well as the skull and jaw of another individual (AMNH 545). Further fossils found in 1892 included another skull (AMNH 547), a forelimb (AMNH 553), and several complete and fragmentary lower jaws (AMNH 549–553 and AMNH 696). Another search in 1894 discovered additional postcranial fossils, including a left scapula (AMNH 1092), a complete right manus (front foot, AMNH 1095), and a complete left pes (hind foot, AMNH 1100). Phalanges, caudal vertebrae, and ribs were also found. The exceptional fossils left only parts of the vertebral column unknown. The skeleton AMNH 546 and the other fossils collected in 1892 were described by Osborn and Jacob Lawson Wortman in 1894, the first description of the postcranial anatomy of any amynodont. The other fossils were described by Osborn and Wortman in 1895.

=== Further finds and other species ===
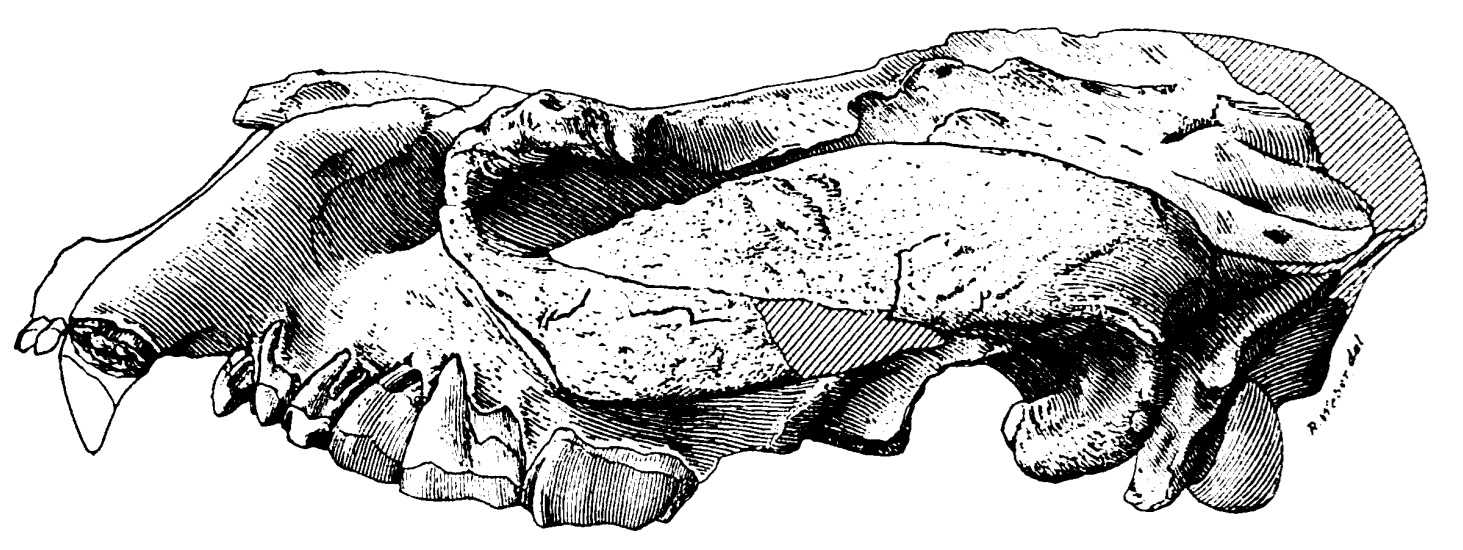
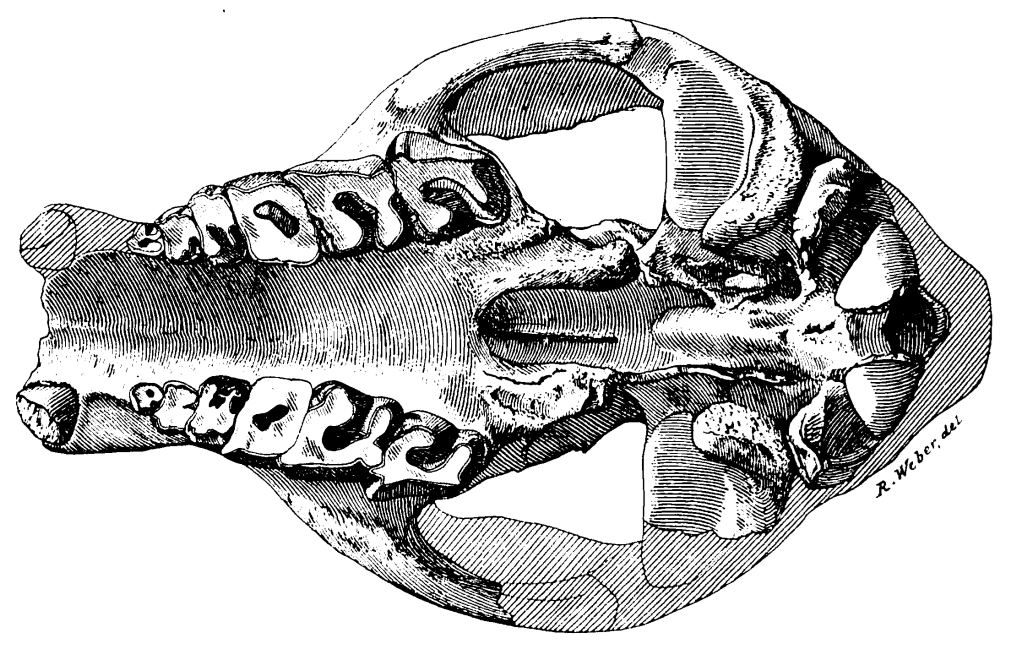
YPM 10274, the type skull of M. rex (now considered a synonym of M. planifrons), illustrated by R. Weber (1921)

In 1921, Edward Leffingwell Troxell described the new species Metamynodon rex, based on the skull YPM 10274, found in the White River Formation in the Pine Ridge Indian Reservation, South Dakota. YPM 10274 had originally been purchased from C. H. Little of South Dakota by Othniel Charles Marsh in 1889, but was not prepared out of its matrix and studied until the 20th century. Although other Metamynodon fossils, including new skulls, had been discovered in the intervening years, Troxell's description of YPM 10274 in 1921 marked the first new Metamynodon fossil to be described since Osborn and Wortman's work in the 1890s. Troxell distinguished M. rex from M. planifrons by several minor dental features, and slight differences in the zygomatic arch.

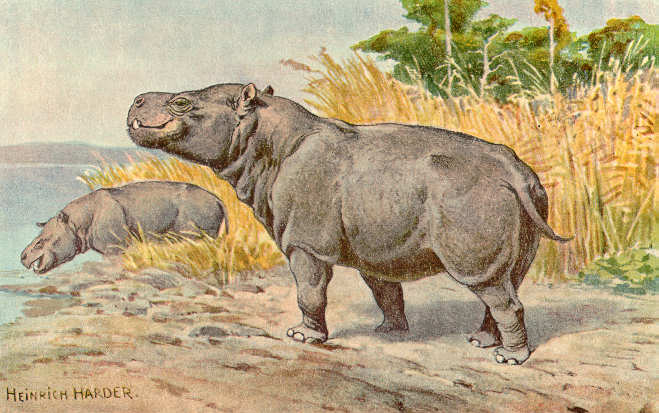
Painting of M. planifrons by Heinrich Harder (c. 1920)

In 1942, Miklós Kretzoi named the new genus and species Cadurcopsis dakotana, based on a skull in the Hungarian National Museum. The C. dakotana skull is from the South Dakota badlands, and was prior to 1942 identified as a M. planifrons skull. Kretzoi distinguished Cadurcopsis from Metamynodon by several features, including a shorter skull, the height of the facial portion of the skull, the slender and more narrow cheekbones, the lack of a diastema (gap) between the canines and premolars, and some dental features. In 1960, Horace Elmer Wood designated both M. rex and C. dakotana as junior synonyms of M. planifrons. Wood's assessments of synonymy have been maintained by later authors.

Wood named the new species Metamynodon chadronensis in 1937. M. chadronensis was based on two associated rami of the lower jaw (AMNH 11866), with preserved cheek teeth, found in the Chadron Formation in South Dakota. The fossil was collected by fossil collecter H. F. Wells in 1903, and originally referred to Metamynodon sp. by William Diller Matthew in 1909. Wood described M. chadronensis as a primitive species of Metamynodon, transitional between earlier amynodonts such as Amynodon and Paramynodon and the more derived M. planifrons, both in its dental features and in its overall body size (being close to that of Paramynodon). Referral to Metamynodon was noted to be provisional, since a skull of M. chadronensis would be needed for comparison.

In 1981, John Andrew Wilson and Judith Schiebout named the new species Metamynodon mckinneyi, based on a lower jaw and some additional jaw fragments found in late Uintan strata the Buck Hill Group in Brewster County, Texas. The species was named after the B. P. McKinney family of the Agua Fria Ranch in Brewster County, who had been helpful to the paleontologists. Wilson and Schiebout referred the fragmentary fossils to Metamynodon based on dental similarities, such as the relative size of the molars and premolars and the loss of one pair of premolars. Wilson and Schiebout suggested that M. mckinneyi could represent an intermediate form between Amynodon and M. chadronensis, though noted that better fossils were required to determine this.

M. chadronensis and M. mckinneyi are based on relatively fragmentary fossils. Both are typically treated as valid species of Metamynodon, though their validity has also been called into question. Both were proposed to be transitional forms between Amynodon and more derived Metamynodon, but several amynodont genera are more derived than Amynodon but less derived than M. planifrons (e.g. Megalamynodon, Sharamynodon, Sellamynodon). In 1989, William P. Wall considered the assignment of both species to Metamynodon to be "open to question", especially in the case of the more primitive M. mckinneyi. Wall suggested detailed comparisons to the closely related Megalamynodon to determine the validity of M. chadronensis and M. mckinneyi. In 2006, Spencer G. Lucas proposed that M. mckinneyi could belong to Zaisanamynodon. In 2023, Veine-Tonizzo et al. considered revisions to be necessary for both M. chadronensis and M. mckinneyi to assess whether they are valid species, as their diagnostic characters are "not specific enough to distinguish them from the type species".

=== Purported finds in Asia ===
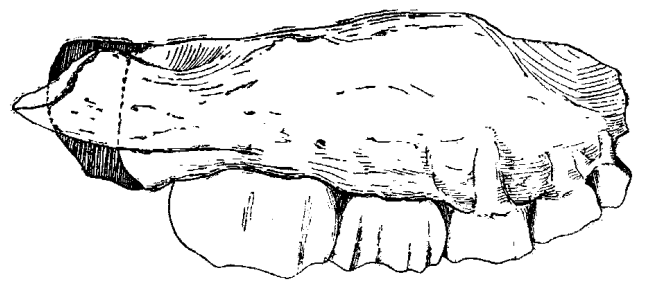
Fossil palate of the giant "Metamynodon bugtiensis" from Pakistan, later identified as a specimen of Paraceratherium

Historically, a number of Asian rhinocerotoid fossils have been referred to Metamynodon. In 1916, Guy Ellcock Pilgrim and George de P. Cotter described the new species Metamynodon birmanicus from the Pondaung Formation in Myanmar. In 1925, Pilgrim named another species from Myanmar, Metamynodon cotteri. Recognizing differences between the Burmese fossils and Metamynodon fossils from North America, William Diller Matthew referred M. birmanicus and M. cotteri to the new genus Paramynodon in 1929. P. cotteri has since also been recognized as a synonym of P. birmanicus.

In 1922, Clive Forster-Cooper described the large species Metamynodon bugtiensis based on fragmentary fossils (including a palate, with twelve teeth preserved) from Dera Bugti in Pakistan. Since 1922, the M. bugtiensis fossils have been variously interpreted as remains of a giant amynodont or as remains of Paraceratherium. Modern reexamination of the fossils revealed that the dentition was misinterpreted by Forster-Cooper, and that M. bugtiensis was an aberrant form of Paraceratherium bugtiense.

Upper molars from the Late Eocene Caijiachong Formation in Yunnan, China, were assigned to Metamynodon sp. by Xu Yu-Xuan in 1961. Xu's molars are considered unlikely to belong to Metamynodon and probably belong to the same taxon as the dubious Gigantamynodon giganteus, known from the same site.

== Description ==
=== Size ===
Life restoration of M. planifrons

M. planifrons was a massive animal, about the same size as large modern rhinoceroses. M. planifrons was 8–14 feet (2.4–4.3 m) long. The relatively complete M. planifrons skeleton AMNH 546 measures 9 feet (2.7 m) long, in the smaller range of known specimens, and stood nearly 5 feet (1.5 m) high, and was about 3 feet (0.91 m) broad at the chest. The body mass of M. planifrons has been estimated at 1,750–1,800 kilograms (3,860–3,970 lb).

M. planifrons was larger than M. chadronensis and M. mckinneyi. The size of the other two species is difficult to estimate on account of their fragmentary fossils; recent estimates put the body mass of M. chadronensis at 995 kilograms (2,194 lb) and that of M. mckinneyi at 931 kilograms (2,053 lb).

=== Skull and jaw ===
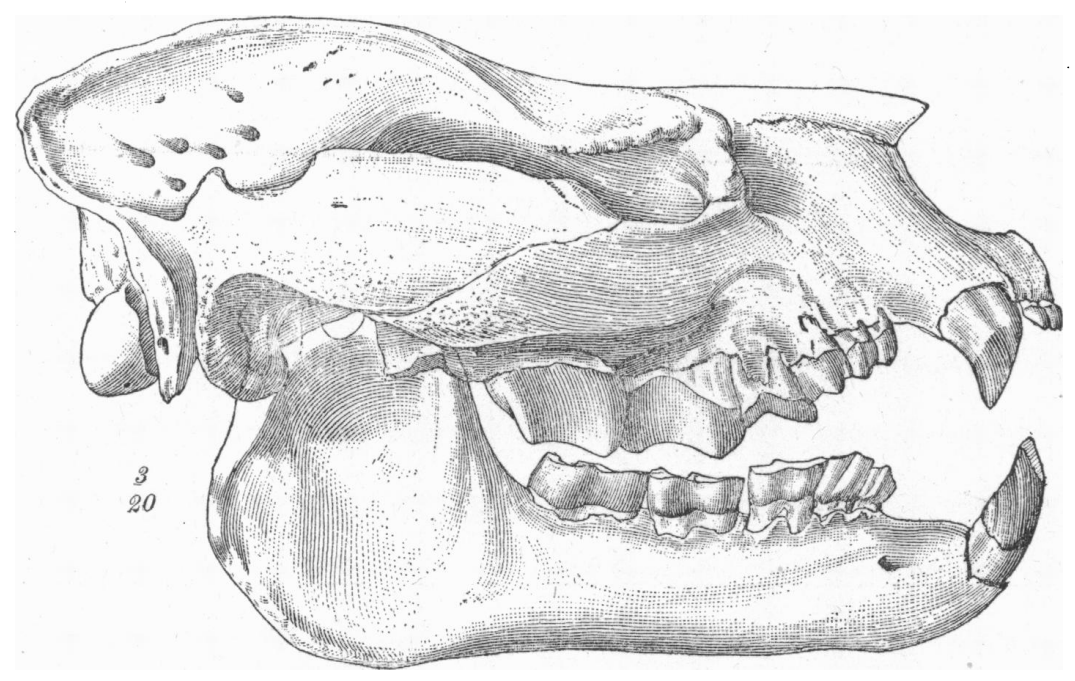
Skull of M. planifrons

The skull of Metamynodon was large, broad, and flat. Among the amynodonts, Metamynodon had one of the most brachycephalic skulls (skull wide relative to its length); the skull of the larger Zaisanamynodon was even more brachycephalic. The zygomatic arches of Metamynodon were expanded and massive, and it had the widest muzzle of all known amynodonts. Metamynodon had a powerful sagittal crest (a ridge on the top of the skull, for jaw muscle attachment).

The orbits (eye sockets) of Metamynodon were deeply enclosed by bone, prominent but small, and placed higher on the skull compared to other amynodonts, even compared to close relatives such as Paramynodon. The eyes were positioned relatively far to the front of the skull due to the preorbital (before the eyes; i.e. the face) part of the skull being shortened. The facial region accounts for less than a third of the skull of Metamynodon; in Amynodon and modern rhinoceroses it accounts for about half of the skull. The preorbital fossae (grooves in front of the orbits) of Metamynodon were greatly reduced. The occiput (back of the skull) was low in Metamynodon, and projected some distance behind the mandibular condyle (the part of the jaw that hinges the jaw to the skull).

The external nares (openings connected to the nostrils) were enlarged and triangular in shape when viewed from the front. Both the premaxillae and the nasal bones of Metamynodon were reduced compared to earlier amynodonts, but still had contact along the border of the external nares. The premaxillae were broad and flattened, and bulged forwards. The nasals were short and broad. The shortened preorbital region and the enlarged external nares suggest that Metamynodon had a prehensile upper lip, similar to modern rhinoceroses and hippopotamuses.

The lower jaw of Metamynodon was long and massive, especially that of M. planifrons.

=== Dentition ===
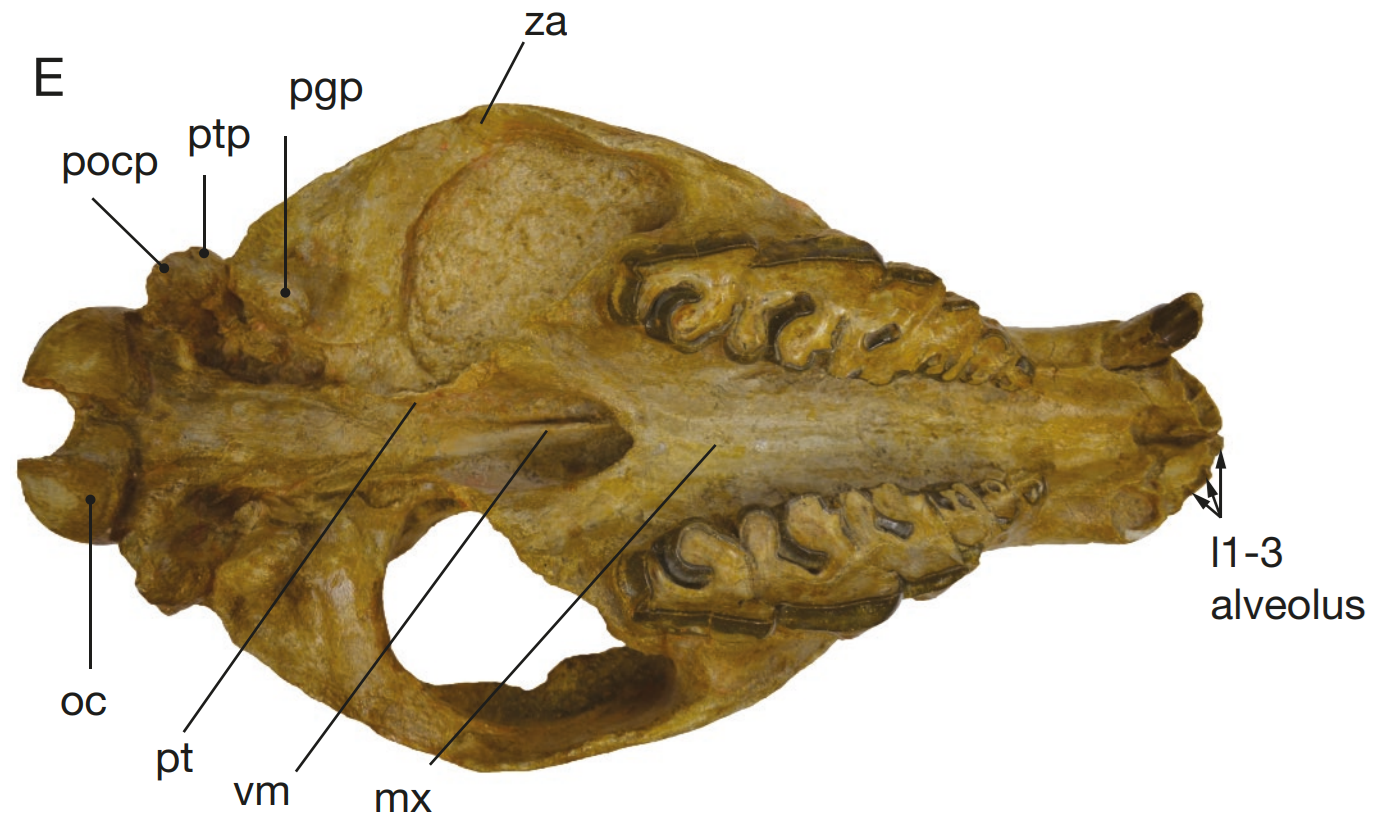
Underside of an M. planifrons skull (UNISTRA.2015.0.1106)

Metamynodon had the dental formula 2–3.1.3.31–3.1.2.3. The tooth row extended back beyond the middle of the skull.

The number of incisors varied in M. planifrons, with had two to three pairs of upper incisors and one to two pairs of lower incisors. The most common configuration is two pairs of upper incisors and one pair of lower incisors. M. mckinneyi had three pairs of lower incisors, and the number of incisors is unknown in M. chadronensis. The canine teeth of Metamynodon were large and tusk-like. The canines of the lower jaw were larger than those in the upper jaw, and slanted forwards. Both pairs of canines curved outwards, similar to the tusks of modern wild boar.

The cheek teeth of Metamynodon were high-crowned. The premolars were reduced in size but the molars were large and powerful, and the lower molars in particular were unusually elongated. Compared to its ancestors, Metamynodon had lost the second lower premolar, and the third lower premolar was either small or absent. The cheek teeth of M. planifrons were narrower than those of M. chadronensis and M. mckinneyi.

=== Postcranial skeleton ===
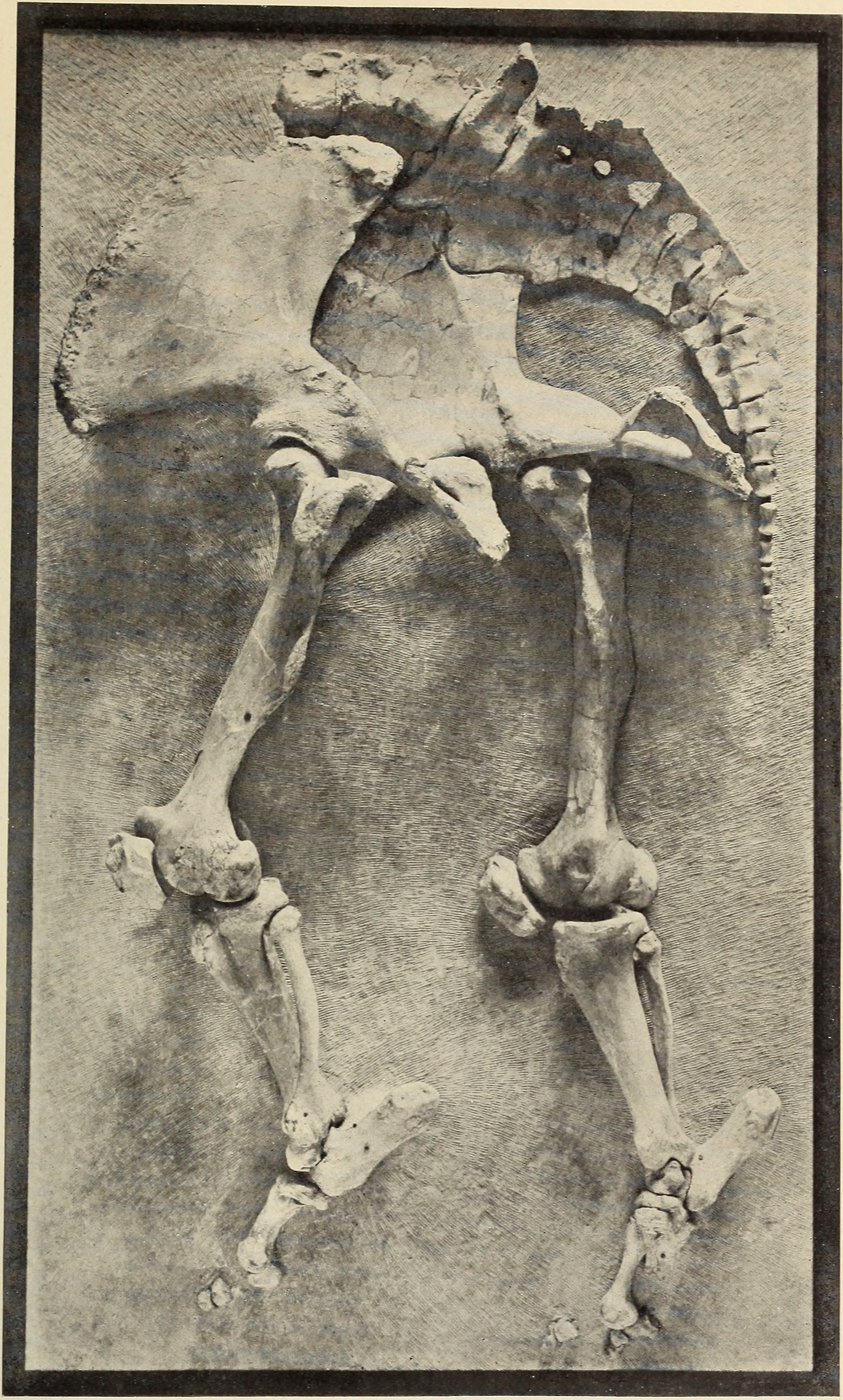
Hind limbs, pelvis, and tail of M. planifrons

Metamynodon had a stout, barrel-shaped, and short-legged body. Its body has been described as that of "an overgrown version of the modern pygmy hippopotamus". The lower part of the abdomen must have been quite low. Metamynodon had flat anterior ribs, but from the seventh rib backwards the ribs become more rounded and quite slender.

Like other amynodonts, Metamynodon had four toes on their manus (front foot) and three on their pes (hind foot), contrary to modern rhinoceroses (which have three toes on every foot).

== Classification ==
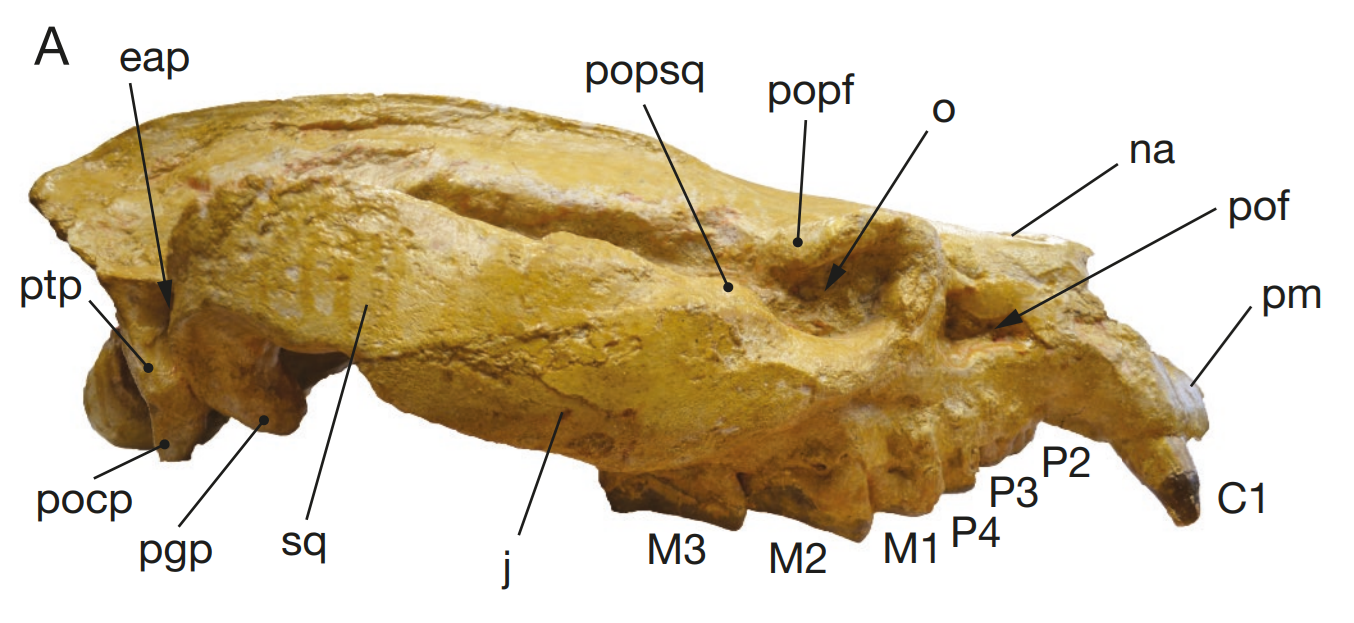
Side view of a skull of M. planifrons (UNISTRA.2015.0.1106)

Metamynodon was immediately recognized as an amynodont upon its discovery, and its derived features helped to show that amynodonts were not ancestral to modern rhinoceroses. Metamynodon has long been recognized as a close relative of Megalamynodon and Paramynodon, and has generally been classified in a clade with those two genera. This clade has gone under various names, such as "Paramynodontinae", "Metamynodontina", and "Metamynodontini". Modern phylogenetic analyses consistently recover such a metamynodont clade, for which Metamynodontini is the generally used name. Historically, Cadurcotherium and Zaisanamynodon have also been treated as metamynodonts, though modern analyses recover them in Cadurcodontini instead. The closest known relative of Metamynodon is Sellamynodon, known from fossils found in Eastern Europe.

The cladogram below presents the results of a phylogenetic analysis by Veine-Tonizzo et al. (2023):

- Amynodontidae
  - Rostriamynodon grangeri
  - - Amynodon advenus
    - - Sharamynodon mongoliensis
      - - Metamynodontini
          - - Paramynodon birmanicus
            - Megalamynodon regalis
          - - Sellamynodon zimborensis
            - Metamynodon planifrons
        - Cadurcodontini
          - - Zaisanamynodon protheroi
            - Zaisanamynodon borisovi
          - - - - Amynodontopsis bodei
                - Amynodontopsis jiyuanensis
              - - Cadurcotherium cayluxi
                - Cadurcotherium minus
            - - Cadurcodon bahoensis
              - - Cadurcodon maomingensis
                - - Cadurcodon ardynensis
                  - Cadurcodon kazakademius

== Paleobiology ==
=== Semiaquatic adaptations ===
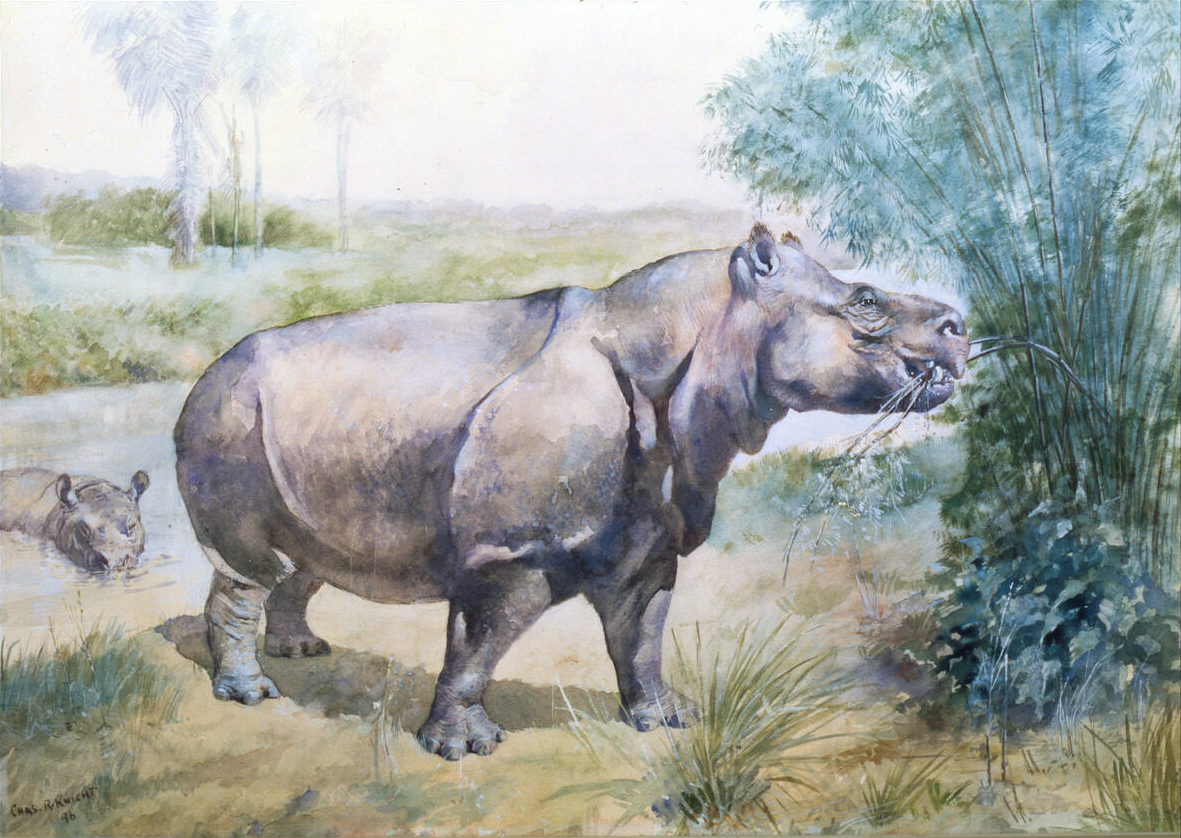
Painting of M. planifrons by Charles R. Knight (1896)

Metamynodon has been interpreted as a semiaquatic animal since the late 20th century. The earliest known mention of the idea that Metamynodon was semiaquatic is by Osborn in a monographic treatment on rhinoceroses in 1898; Osborn may not have been the originator of the idea, since he phrased it as if it was common knowledge. Metamynodon having a semiaquatic lifestyle is supported not only by various anatomical features, but also by the sediments in which its fossils are found. Metamynodon fossils are commonly found associated with channel sandstones, sedimentary rock created by rivers or streams. These channel sandstones are often referred to as the "Metamynodon sandstones" or "Metamynodon channel sandstones", and their sedimentary level has been called the "Metamynodon level".

The orbits of Metamynodon were placed relatively high up on the skull. This is traditionally interpreted as an adaptation to semiaquatic life, so that Metamynodon could see above water while otherwise fully submerged. The position of the orbits sets Metamynodon apart from most other amynodonts. In basal amynodonts such as Rostriamynodon and Amynodon, the orbits are in a similar position as in other primitive perissodactyls, such as Hyrachyus. In the cadurcodontine amynodont Cadurcodon, the orbits are located relatively low on the skull. Some scholars have questioned the usefulness of this trait in inferring lifestyle, arguing that the orbit position of Metamynodon is only subtly different form other amynodonts, and not as high as in the hippopotamus.

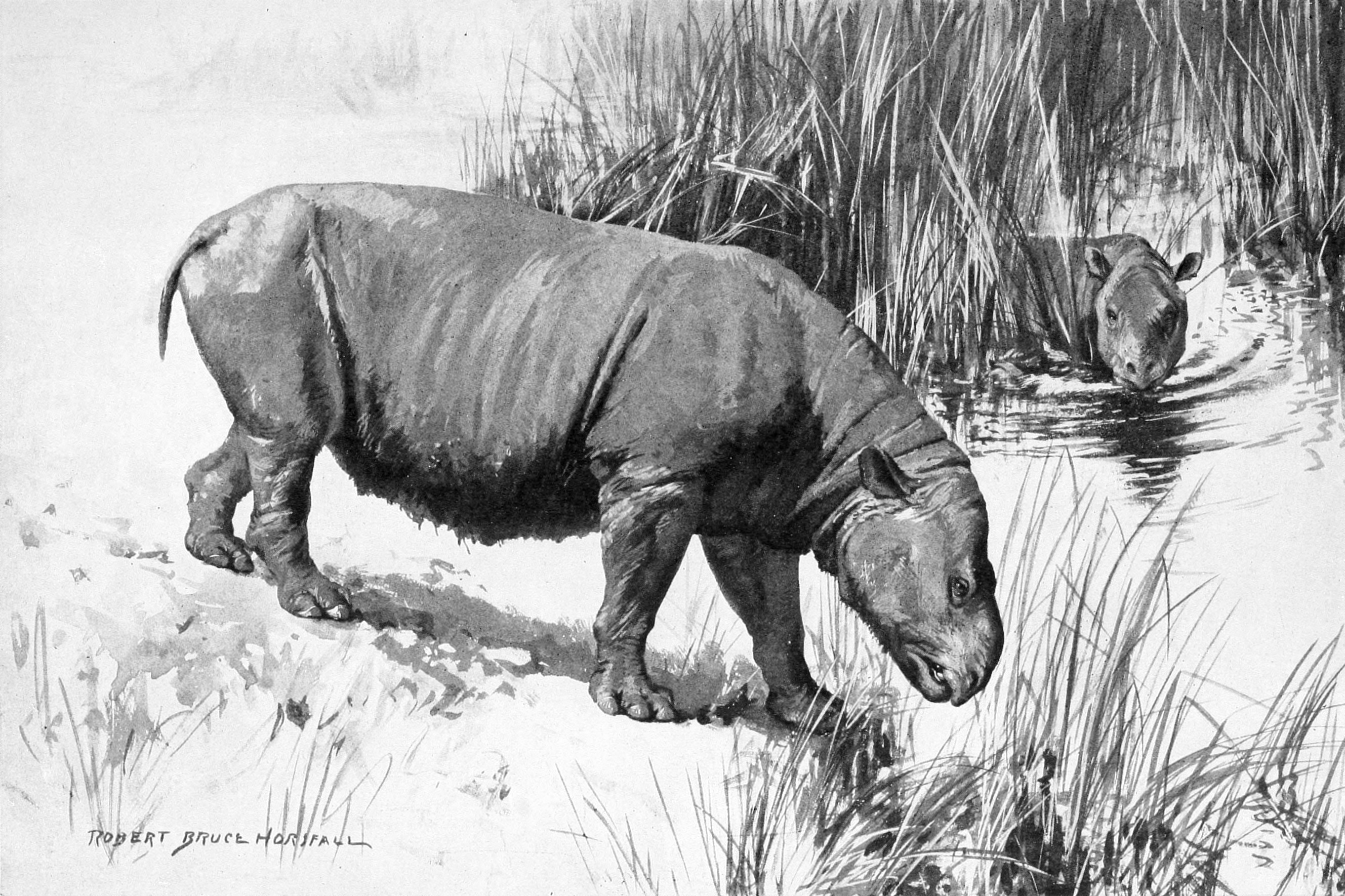
Painting of M. planifrons by Robert Bruce Horsfall (1913)

Semiaquatic mammals often have external nares that open high on the snout. In the hippopotamus, the nasal bones are retracted so that they do not hang over the external nares (as they do in many mammals); this, in combination with a backward sloping of the nares, results in the nostrils of the hippopotamus opening upwards on the snout. In Metamynodon skulls, the nasal bones are reduced backwards compared to other amynodonts, either not overhanging the external nares at all or barely overhanging them; upwards-positioned nostrils like those of the hippopotamus are thus possible. A commonly recognized byproduct of semiaquatic life in mammals is a reduced sense of smell. There is no direct evidence for Metamynodon's sense of smell, but its reduced preorbital fossae could correlate with reduced snout size, and thus perhaps a poorer sense of smell compared to other amynodonts.

Several features of the postcranial skeleton can indicate semiaquatic lifestyles since semiaquatic animals do not need to constantly support their own body weight. The spines of the thoracic vertebrae of Metamynodon are reduced compared to more basal amynodonts, such as Amynodon and Sharamynodon. This is similar to hippopotamus vertebrae, and indicates weak neck muscles, perhaps due to the animal not needing to support the head while submerged in water. The expanded and broad rib cage of Metamynodon, much broader than in more basal amynodonts, is another similarity to the hippopotamus and has also been interpreted as evidence for a semiaquatic lifestyle. In hippopotamuses, the expanded rib cage supports an enlarged digestive tract; it is thus not expanded due to life in the water, but life in the water provides relief for the altered body shape. In Metamynodon, the expanded rib cage may similarly only have been possible due to a semiaquatic lifestyle. The limb proportions of Metamynodon are nearly identical those of the hippopotamus and differ from more basal amynodonts and modern terrestrial mammals. An index of olecranon process length divided by radius length multiplied by 100 yields 49.11 for Metamynodon and 48.58 for the hippopotamus, compared to 21.53 in Rangifer, 30.9 in Tapirus, 33.3 in Ceratotherium, and 25.52 in Amynodon.

Various other traits have historically been suggested to be additional evidence for semiaquatic life in Metamynodon, such as the large canines and the broad muzzle. The usefulness of these traits in inferring a semiaquatic lifestyle have been doubted. Based on Metamynodon, amynodonts as a whole were historically interpreted as a semiaquatic group of animals. Modern studies have suggested that clear evidence of semiaquatic life in amynodonts may be restricted to Metamynodon and its close relatives (the metamynodonts). According to William P. Wall, Metamynodon itself "possibly represents the extreme stage in amynodontid evolution toward this mode of life".

=== Canine function ===
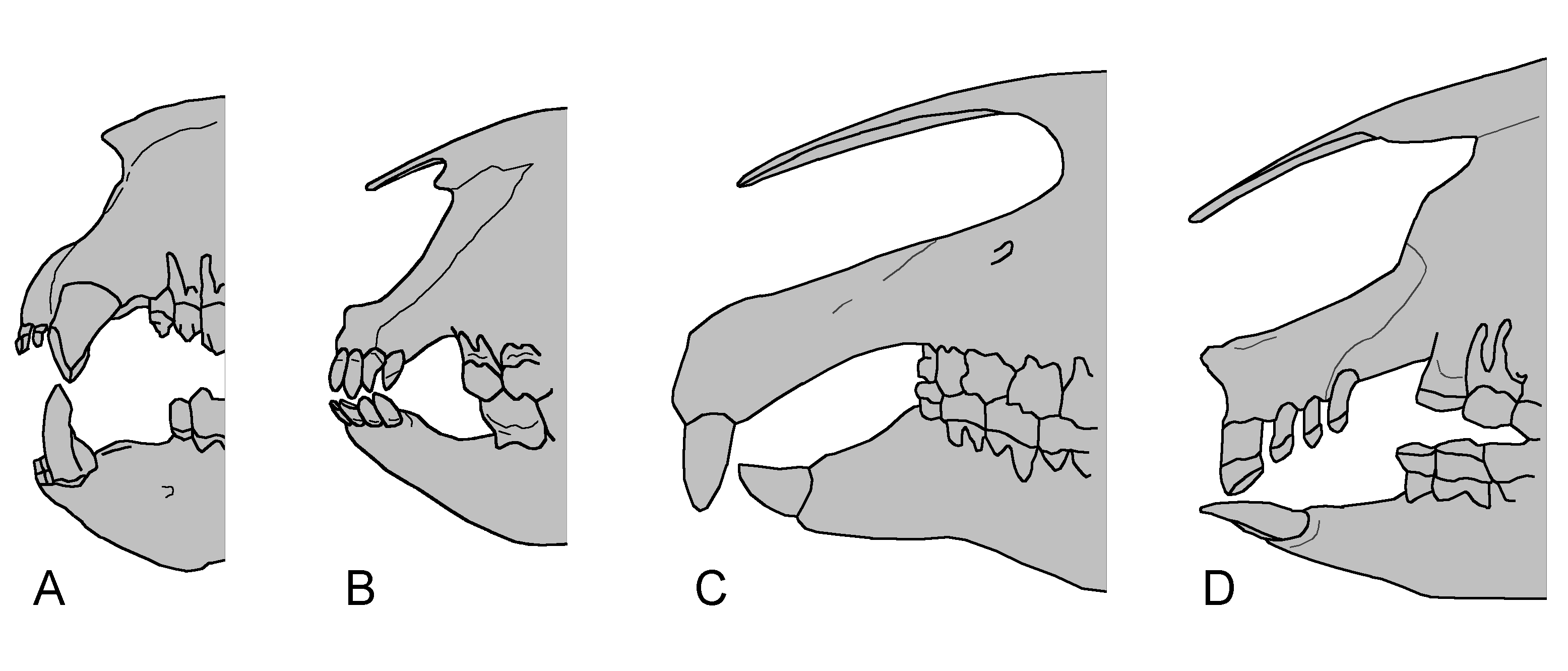
Front teeth of various extinct rhinocerotoids: Metamynodon (A), Hyracodon (B), Paraceratherium (C), and Trigonias (D)

Amynodonts are characterized by large, tusk-like canines. The canines were especially large in Metamynodon and other metamynodonts. Osborn and Wortman considered the enlarged canines of Metamynodon to be the most exceptional feature of its dentition. In amynodonts, canine size is variable within species in a pattern that implies that it was a sexually dimorphic feature. The function of the large canines in life is not known. Based on modern mammals with enlarged canines, including hippopotamuses, the canines may have been used both for display purposes and as weapons.

In 1941, William Berryman Scott interpreted the large canines as further evidence of a semiaquatic lifestyle, since large canines are also seen in hippopotamuses. Although this is another trait convergent with hippopotamuses, canine size by itself is not an additional indicator for semiaquatic life since large canines are also seen in several terrestrial mammals, such as pigs.

=== Diet and feeding ===
Metamynodon has been interpreted as a grazer. The large and high-crowned molars of Metamynodon indicate that it might have been adapted to grind down abrasive vegetation.

== Paleoecology ==
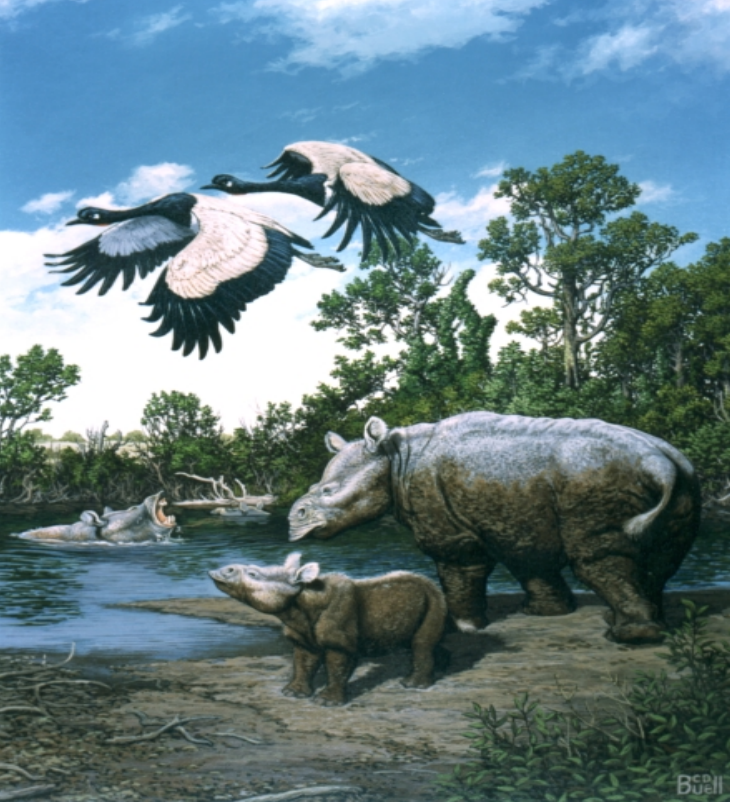
Life restoration of M. planifrons in an Early Oligocene river environment, with Balearica flying above

The White River badlands, from which Metamynodon is mainly known, contain some of the most productive mammal fossil sites in the world, and have been critical for studies on paleoclimate and mammal evolution in the Paleogene period. Metamynodon probably inhabited river systems across most of North America. Metamynodon is rare in Eocene deposits. The late Uintan M. mckinneyi from the Buck Hill Group in Texas is the earliest known representative of the genus. The oldest known fossils of M. planifrons are from the Chadronian Byram Formation in Mississippi.

Chadronian North America was warm temperate to subtropical, and dominated by forests and open woodlands. The Late Eocene herbivore community in North America was dominated by mammals with browsing diets, and contemproary groups included large brontotheres, hyracodonts, early true rhinoceroses, equids, anthracotheres, entelodonts, peccaries, early and small camelids, agriochoerids, merycoidodonts, protoceratids, and early traguloids. Contemporary predatory groups included hyaenodonts, amphicyonids, canids, ursids, and aeluroids.

Oligocene North America was drier and more arid than during the Eocene, and habitats such as open floodplains and shrublands became more common. Metamynodon fossils are the most common in Early Oligocene (Orellan) deposits. It is not clear if this reflects an actual increase in population size, since the channel sandstones that commonly yield Metamynodon fossils are most common at Orellan levels. The herbivore fauna in North America underwent changes in the Oligocene. The brontotheres, which had been a dominant component of the fauna, did not persist beyond the end of the Eocene. The extinction of the brontotheres made Metamynodon the largest mammal in North America during the Early Oligocene. Merycoidodonts became a more dominant component of the fauna, and increasingly adapted mixed-feeding diets over the course of the Oligocene. Many herbivore groups also persisted, with largely unchanged diets, such as camelids, entelodonts, protoceratids, peccaries, anthracotheres, traguloids, agriochoerids. All of the major predatory groups of the Chadronian persisted into the Oligocene, and the diversities seen in the Chadronian and Orellan were very similar. The specialized hyaenodonts and nimravids declined sharply in the later Whitneyan, and especially in the Arikareean, and small omnivorous canids became more common.

After the Orellan, Metamynodon was once again a rare component of the fauna. Metamynodon probably declined during the Whitneyan and is not believed to have persisted into the Arikareean. Metamynodon is not known from the Whitneyan "Protoceras channel sandstones" of South Dakota. The latest known Metamynodon fossils, of Whitneyan age, are known from North Dakota. After the extinction of Metamynodon, there were no large and semiaquatic herbivores in North America until the Middle Miocene, when the rhinoceros Teleoceras appeared and occupied a similar ecological niche.
