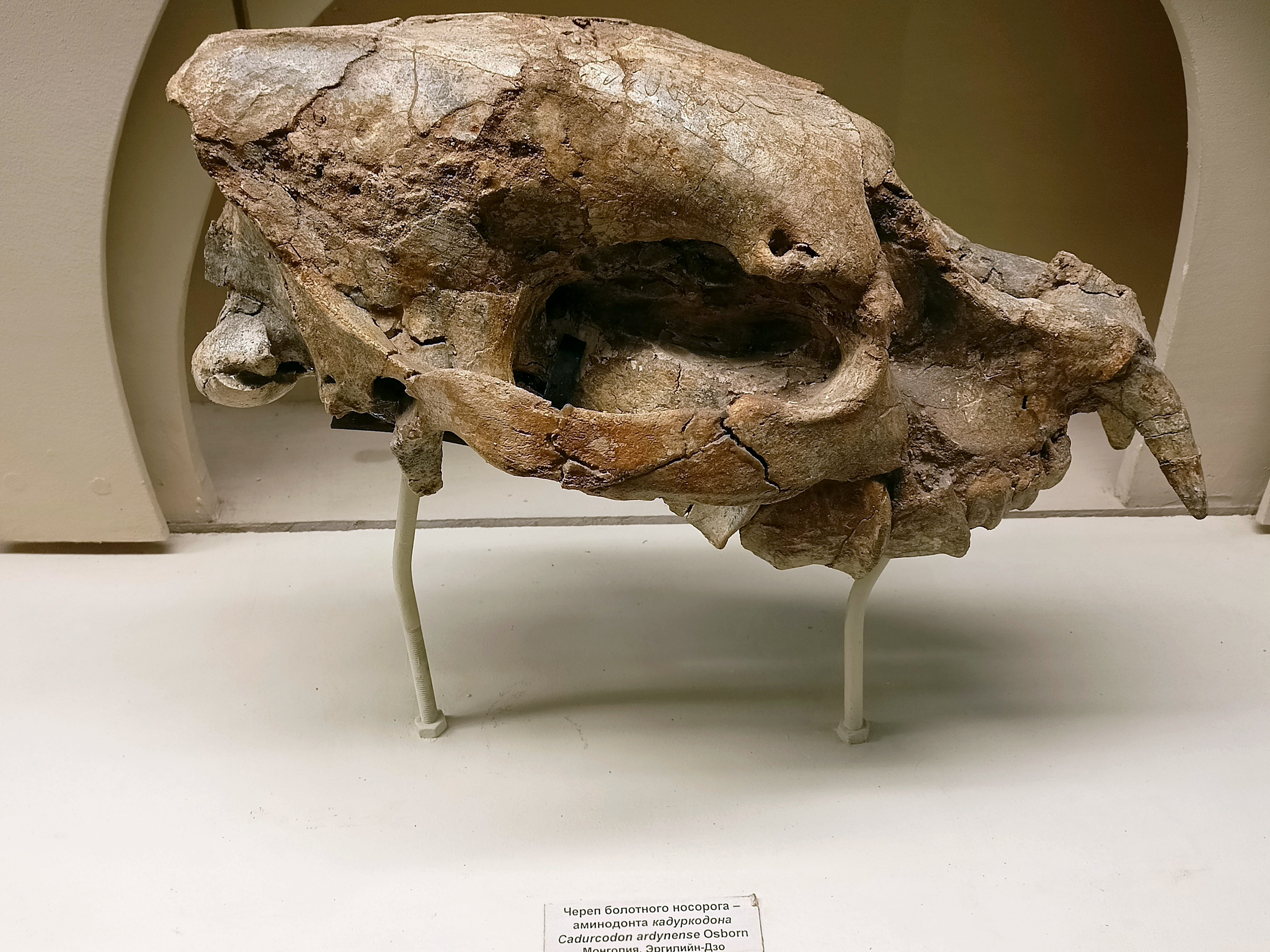
- Skull of C. ardynensis, Moscow Paleontological Museum

Scientific classification
- Kingdom: Animalia
- Phylum: Chordata
- Class: Mammalia
- Order: Perissodactyla
- Superfamily: Rhinocerotoidea
- Family: †Amynodontidae
- Tribe: †Cadurcodontini
- Genus: †Cadurcodon; Kretzoi, 1942

Type species
- †Cadurcotherium ardynense (original combination) Osborn, 1923

Species
- †C. ardynensis (Osborn, 1923); †C. bahoensis? (Xu, 1965); †C. houldjinensis Wang et al., 2009; †C. kazakademius Biryukov, 1961; †C. matthewi Wall, 1981; †C. maomingensis Averianov et al., 2017; †C. suhaituensis? (Xu, 1966); †C. zaisanensis? Belyaeva, 1962

Synonyms
- Genus synonymy: Paracadurcodon? Xu, 1966; Sianodon? Xu, 1965; Synonyms of C. ardynensis: Cadurcotherium ardynense Osborn, 1923

= Cadurcodon =

Cadurcodon Temporal range: Middle Eocene–Middle Oligocene (Sharamurunian–Hsandagolian)42.7–30.6 Ma

Extinct genus of mammals

Cadurcodon is an extinct genus of amynodont that lived during the Middle Eocene to Middle Oligocene. Cadurcodon had a wide geographic range, stretching from the Balkans to East Asia. The type species, C. ardynensis, is known from the Late Eocene of Bulgaria, Kazakhstan, Mongolia, and China. Several other species are recognized, all from either Kazakhstan or China. The genera Paracadurcodon and Sianodon, both known from China, may be synonyms of Cadurcodon.

Most species of Cadurcodon reached a body mass of over a tonne, making it one of the largest amynodonts. The largest species, C. kazakademius, is estimated to have weighed 2,247 kilograms (4,954 lb). C. ardynensis was the smallest species, but was still a relatively large amynodont at 846 kilograms (1,865 lb). Cadurcodon was a derived amynodont belonging to the cadurcodontine tribe, a group of relatively lightly built and tapir-like amynodonts. The skull anatomy of Cadurcodon suggests that it had a tapir-like proboscis in life.

== Research history ==
=== Description and diagnosis of C. ardynensis ===
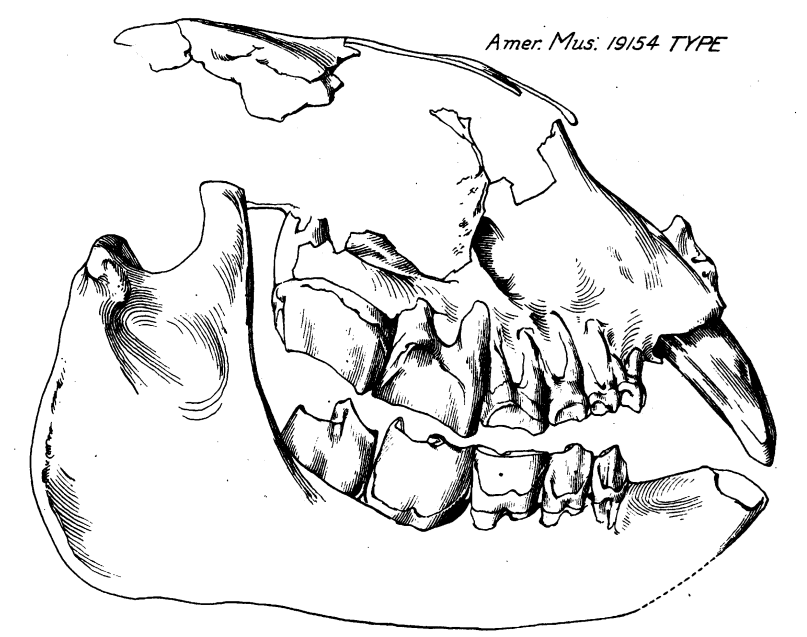
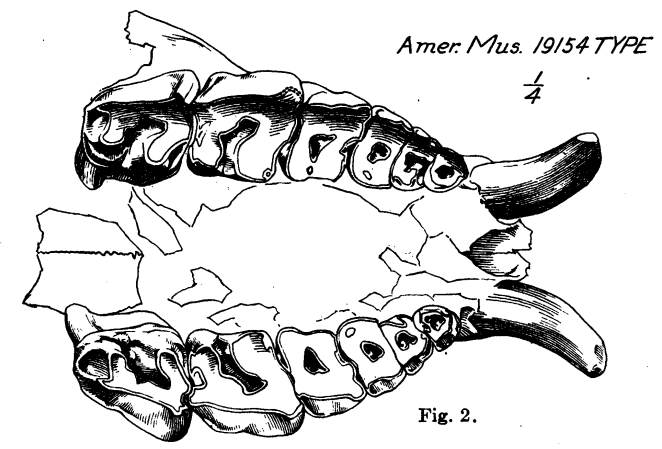
Type specimen of C. ardynensis (AMNH 19154), a partial skull

The first known Cadurcodon fossils were found in 1922, in the Late Eocene Ergilin Dzo Formation in Mongolia by an expedition from the American Museum of Natural History. In 1923, Henry Fairfield Osborn named the new species Cadurcotherium ardynense, based mainly on a skull and lower jaw (AMNH 19154), with probably associated limbs and feet. Osborn also designated several paratype specimens (AMNH 19155–19158), which included isolated teeth and fragments of upper and lower jaws. Osborn noted that the animal was similar to, and about the same size as, the European species Cadurcotherium cayluxi, but that it had shorter-crowned molars and upper premolars with a more developed median fossa (one of the depressions on the surface of the tooth).

After further preparation of the fossils, Osborn published a more detailed description of Cadurcotherium ardynense in 1924. Osborn changed the paratypes of the species to AMNH 20441 (lower jaw of an adult), AMNH 20442 (limb and foot bones), AMNH 20443 (lower jaw of a juvenile), and AMNH 20444 (palate from an old individual), all found in the same quarry. Of the original paratypes, only AMNH 19155 (a young skull with several teeth) had its status as such retained. The wealth of specimens found, of different ages and presumably different sexes, made C. ardynense the best known Asian amynodont.

In 1942, Miklós Kretzoi referred C. ardynense to the new genus Cadurcodon. Kretzoi based the new genus on the canines being a different shape in C. ardynense, and by the "lower evolutionary level of the molars", though he did not provide a proper diagnosis of Cadurcodon. Cadurcodon eventually received detailed generic diagnoses by Vera Gromova in 1954, and by William P. Wall in 1989. The majority of modern researchers spell the species name as ardynensis, instead of Osborn's original spelling ardynense. Ivan Kostov Nikolov and Kurt Heissig used the original spelling in 1985, i.e. referring to the species as Cadurcodon ardynense.

=== Additional species and fossils ===
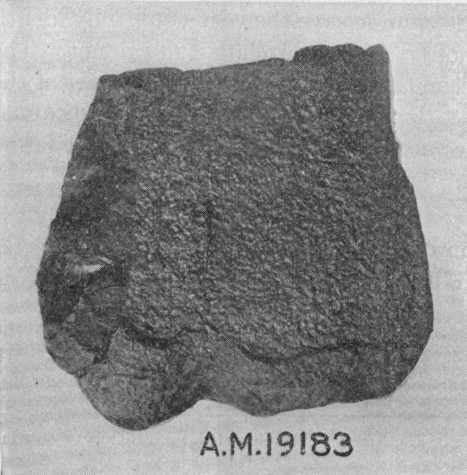
A molar of C. houldjinensis

In 1961, M.D. Biryukov named a second species of Cadurcodon, C. kazakademius, based on a single mandible with some preserved teeth (KAN 663-160/54-T) from Kazakhstan. The fossil was found at Myneske-Suyek, east of the salt lake Shalkarteniz. Biryukov identified the stratigraphic unit as the "Kutanbulak svita", whereas other Soviet paleontologists used the name "indricothere svita", Middle Oligocene in age. The fragmentary C. kazakademius fossil material closely resembles C. ardynensis but is about 20 to 30 % larger in all measurements. Later researchers have continued to recognize C. kazakademius as a valid species of Cadurcodon. Biryukov described another amynodont in 1963, "Amynodon" tuskabakensis, based on a single molar found near Lake Zaysan in Kazakhstan. In 2017, Averianov et al. identified "A". tuskbakensis as a species of Cadurcotherium through unique shared derived characteristics.

A third species, Cadurcodon zaisanensis, was described by Belyaeva in 1962, based on a single fragment of a dentary found in eastern Kazakhstan, in the Early Oligocene Buran Formation. In 1996, Lucas and Emry suggested that C. zaisanensis might be a junior synonym of C. ardynensis, from which it is largely undistinguishable. They were hesitant to synonymize the two, since C. zaisanensis had an exceptionally long upper third molar, 30 % longer than the corresponding tooth in specimens of C. ardynensis in the American Museum of Natural History, and 20 % longer than the corresponding tooth in the largest C. ardynensis specimens reported by Gromova in 1954. In 1981, the species Cadurcodon matthewi was described, based on skull material from the Ulan Gochu Formation in Mongolia.

In 1985, Nikolov and Heissig assigned several isolated teeth from the Late Eocene of Bulgaria to C. ardynensis, greatly extending the known geographic range of both the species and the genus. Nikolov and Heissig's assignment of the teeth to C. ardynensis was upheld by Jérémy Tissier et al. in 2018. Some other Cadurcodon fossils from the Balkans have been reclassified. In 1989, a fossil mandible from Dobârca in Romania was used to name the new species Cadurcodon zimborensis; Tissier et al. (2018) reassigned C. zimborensis to the new genus Sellamynodon. In 1996, Lucas and Emry reported fragmentary C. ardynensis fossils (isolated teeth) from the locality "pantsernny sloy" on the northern shore of Lake Zaysan in Khazakhstan.

The species Cadurcodon houldjinensis was named in 2009 by Wang Ban-Yue, Qiu Zhan-Xiang, Zhang Quan-Zhong, Wu Li-Jun, and Ning Pei-Jie, based on isolated teeth and dentary fragments from the Houldjin Formation near Erenhot in Inner Mongolia, China, Late Eocene in age. The type specimen of C. houldjinensis is a right second molar, EMM 0126. C. houldjinensis was distinguished from C. ardynensis and C. zaisanensis mostly by its larger size, alongside some dental features. C. houldjinensis is close in size to C. kazakdemius, but again differs in several dental features, such as its more hypsodont (higher-crowned) cheek teeth. Wang et al. identified some teeth from the Houldjin Formation in the American Museum of Natural History, figured by Walter W. Granger and William Diller Matthew in 1923, as belonging to C. houldjinensis and C. ardynensis.

In 2017, Alexander Averianov, Igor Danilov, Jin Jinhua and Wang Yingyong described a new species of Cadurcodon, C. maomingensis, based on a partial skull (SYSU-M-3) and some vertebrae found in the Middle to Late Eocene Youganwo Formation in Guangdong, China. The skull was found in an oil shale quarry near Maoming City. C. maomingensis was distinguished from other species by its unique combination of dental features, such as its relatively long third molar, having only one pair of lower incisors, and features of the cusps and surfaces of the molars and premolars.

=== Sianodon and Paracadurcodon ===
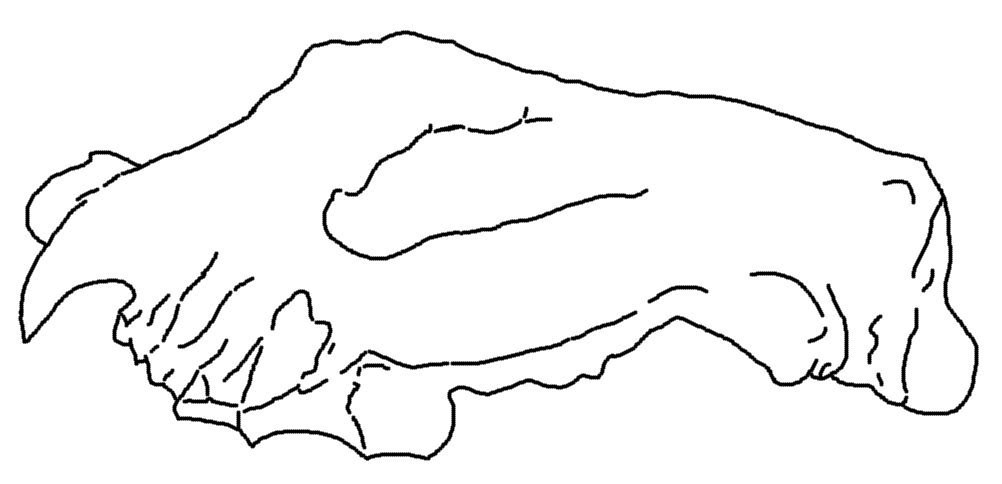
Illustration of the type skull of Sianodon bahoensis (IVPP V.3015). Sianodon has been argued to be a junior synonym of Cadurcodon.

In addition to naming C. maomingensis, Averianov et al. (2017) revised the genus-level diagnosis of Cadurcodon. As part of this, they argued that two other amynodont genera, Paracadurcodon and Sianodon, were junior synonyms of Cadurcodon. In total, Averianov et al. recognized six valid species of Cadurcodon: C. ardynensis, C. kazakdemius, C. bahoensis (previously Sianodon bahoensis), C. suhaituensis (previously Paracadurcodon suhaituensis), C. houldjinensis, and C. maomingensis. C. zaisanensis was not formally designated as a synonym of C. ardynensis, but was noted as not clearly differentiable.

Sianodon and its type species S. bahoensis were described by Xu Yu-Xuan in 1965. Xu did not compare Sianodon to Cadurcodon beyond noting that Sianodon was "more primitive". According to Averianov et al., none of the features in Xu's diagnosis of Sianodon separate it from Cadurcodon, with the sole exception that the molars of Sianodon have labial grooves (grooves that separate trigonids and talonids), which are either shallower or completely absent in Cadurcodon. In 1989, Wall listed some additional features separating the two genera but most of Wall's features were argued by Averianov et al. to vary with ontogeny and sex. Paracadurcodon and its single and type species P. suhaituensis were described by Xu in 1966. Paracadurcodon was distinguished by there only being a single pair of lower incisors, three pairs of lower premolars, and a short mandibular symphysis. The number of incisors is variable across Cadurcodon species, and the number of premolars appears to be a sexually dimorphic trait, which Averianov et al. argued placed Paracadurcodon within the range of variation of Cadurcodon. In addition to S. bahoensis, several additional species of Sianodon have been named. Averianov et al. recognized none of these other species as belonging to Cadurcodon.

The designation of Paracadurcodon and Sianodon as junior synonyms of Cadurcodon, and C. suhaituensis and C. bahoensis as species of Cadurcodon, was accepted by Tissier et al. (2018), Wang et al. (2020), and Veine-Tonizzo et al. (2023). Tissier et al. recovered Sianodon as traditionally understood to be paraphyletic, with S. gaowangouensis much more basal than C. bahoensis. Wang et al. noted that the classification of species of Sianodon other than S. bahoensis is in need of investigation. The name Sianodon continues to see use by several authors.

== Description ==
Reconstruction of the snout morphology of Cadurcodon, including a large proboscis

Cadurcodon was among the largest amynodonts, though it was eclipsed in size by some other genera, such as Zaisanamynodon. The smallest species of Cadurcodon was the Late Eocene C. ardynensis at 846 ± 47 kilograms (1,865 ± 104 lb), and the largest was the Middle Oligocene C. kazakademius at 2,247 kilograms (4,954 lb). There was no significant increase in size from early to late species; the Late Eocene C. houldjinensis was near C. kazakdemius in size, at 1,989 ± 253 kilograms (4,385 ± 558 lb), and the basal species C. maomingensis was relatively large at 1,441 kilograms (3,177 lb). C. zaisanensis had a body mass of 1,225 kilograms (2,701 lb).

Compared to the robust and semiaquatic metamynodontines, cadurcodontines such as Cadurcodon were lightly built amynodonts that may have been similar to modern tapirs in life. Contrary to the metamynodontines, they are interpreted as terrestrial mammals. Distinctive features of the skull of Cadurcodon include the greatly enlarged and tusk-like canines, a feature also seen in other amynodonts, and the greatly shortened facial region. Several of the features of the skull, including the reduction of the nasal bones, the expanded nasal incision, and the presence of muscle scars on the snout (behind the external nares) indicate that Cadurcodon had a well-developed proboscis similar to that of modern tapirs.

== Classification ==
Phylogenetic analyses consistently recover Cadurcodon as a derived genus in the eponymous amynodont tribe Cadurcodontini. The cladogram below presents the results of a phylogenetic analysis by Veine-Tonizzo et al. (2023):

- Amynodontidae
  - Rostriamynodon grangeri
  - - Amynodon advenus
    - - Sharamynodon mongoliensis
      - - Metamynodontini
          - - Paramynodon birmanicus
            - Megalamynodon regalis
          - - Sellamynodon zimborensis
            - - Metamynodon planifrons
              - UNISTRA.2015.0.1106
        - Cadurcodontini
          - - Zaisanamynodon protheroi
            - - Zaisanamynodon borisovi
              - ZSN-KKS-28-IPB
          - - - - Amynodontopsis bodei
                - Amynodontopsis jiyuanensis
              - - Cadurcotherium cayluxi
                - Cadurcotherium minus
            - - Cadurcodon bahoensis
              - - Cadurcodon maomingensis
                - - Cadurcodon ardynensis
                  - Cadurcodon kazakademius
