= Cadurcotherium =

Cadurcotherium Temporal range: Early–Late Oligocene, 33.9–23 Ma
- Partial maxilla of C. cayluxi

Scientific classification
- Kingdom: Animalia
- Phylum: Chordata
- Class: Mammalia
- Order: Perissodactyla
- Superfamily: Rhinocerotoidea
- Family: †Amynodontidae
- Tribe: †Cadurcodontini
- Genus: †Cadurcotherium; Gervais, 1873

Type species
- †Cadurcotherium cayluxi Gervais, 1873

Other species
- †C. indicum Pilgrim, 1910; †C. minus Filhol, 1880; †C. progressus? (Gromova, 1954); †C. rakoveci Malez & Thenius, 1985; †C. tuskabakensis (Biryukov, 1963)

Synonyms
- Genus synonymy: Cadurcamynodon Kretzoi, 1942; Hypsamynodon? Gromova, 1954; Synonyms of C. cayluxi: C. nouleti Roman & Joleaud, 1909; Synonyms of C. indicum: Cadurcamynodon indicum (Pilgrim, 1910); Synonyms of C. tuskabakensis: Amynodon tuskabakensis (Biryukov, 1963); Hypsamynodon tuskabakensis (Biryukov, 1963)

Extinct genus of mammals

Cadurcotherium is an extinct genus of amynodont that lived in Europe and Asia during the Oligocene. Five species of Cadurcotherium are currently recognized; C. cayluxi from France and Spain, C. minus from France and Switzerland, C. rakoveci from Bosnia-Herzegovina, C. tuskabakensis from Kazakhstan, and C. indicum from Pakistan. Fragmentary fossils of Cadurcotherium have also been described from Germany and Myanmar.

Cadurcotherium was described in 1873, and was the first amynodont to be described. Cadurcotherium was originally known only from isolated teeth and jaw fragments. More complete fossils of Cadurcotherium, including skulls and postcranial fossils, were described in 1995 and 2018. Cadurcotherium did not share the robust and hippopotamus-like build of some other amynodonts; it had elongated limbs, and is interpreted as both a grazer and a forager, with a preference for dry open woodland environments. Dentally, Cadurcotherium is characterized mainly by its very hypsodont (high-crowned) cheek teeth and very narrow lower molars.

C. indicum, perhaps the largest species of Cadurcotherium, could reach an estimated size of 1,832 kilograms (4,039 lb). C. indicum was also the last known living species of the genus, and the last known living amynodont overall, going extinct in the latest Oligocene.

== Research history ==
=== Europe ===
==== Species and range ====
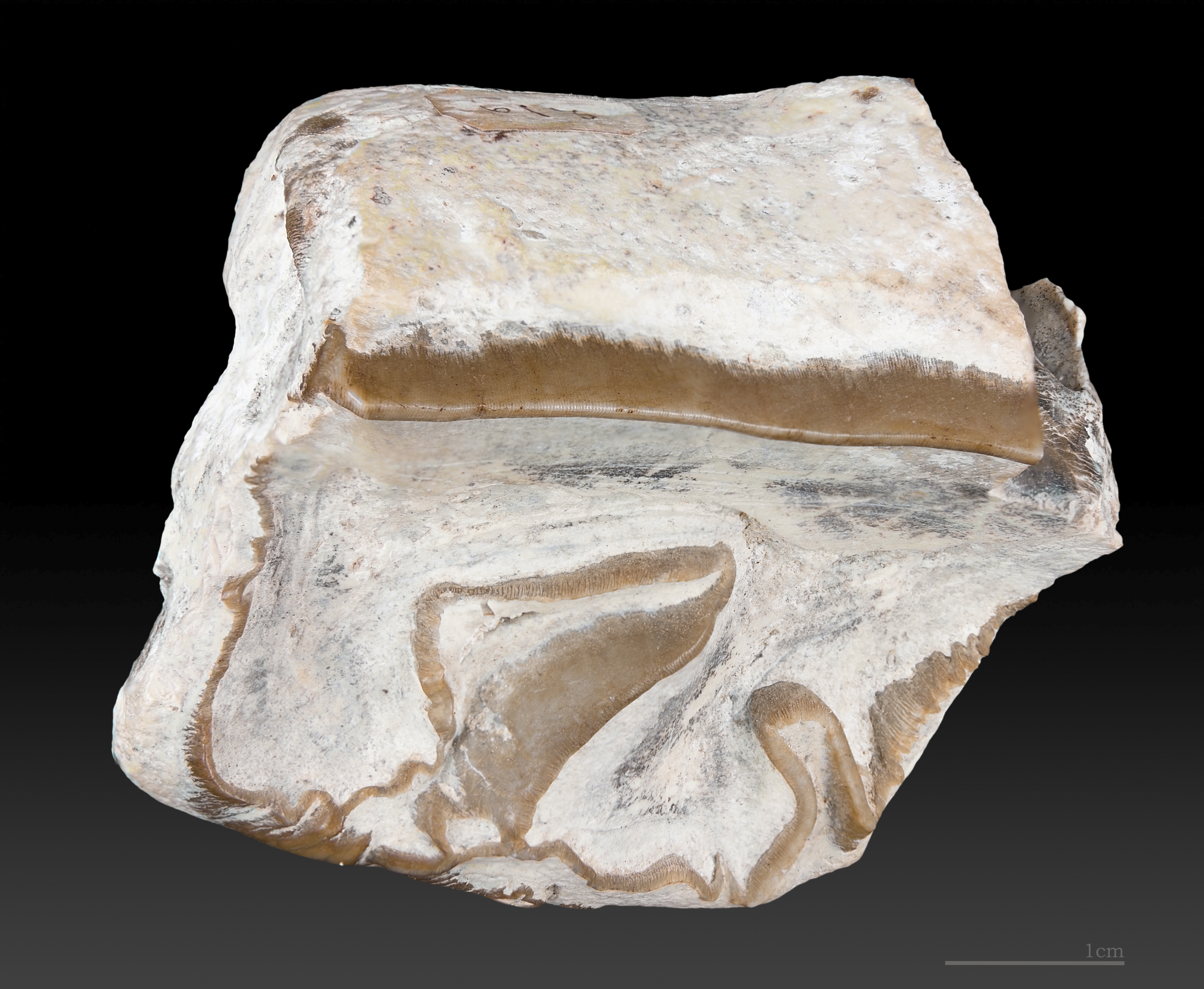
Paratype tooth of C. nouleti, now considered a synonym of C. cayluxi

Cadurcotherium cayluxi was described by Paul Gervais in 1873. Gervais based C. cayluxi on a collection of isolated molars from the Quercy Phosphorites Formation. Cadurcotherium is now recognized as the first amynodont to be described. The scant fossil material made initial identification of the animal difficult, beyond the similarity to rhinoceros teeth. The age of the fossils was also uncertain at the time. Gervais believed them to be Eocene in age, based on the erroneous consensus of the time. In 1876, Jean-Baptiste Noulet reported that he had discovered a C. cayluxi tooth in deposits that also yielded fossils of Anthracotherium and Protaceratherium, which indicated an Oligocene age. All Cadurcotherium fossils in Europe are now dated to the Oligocene.

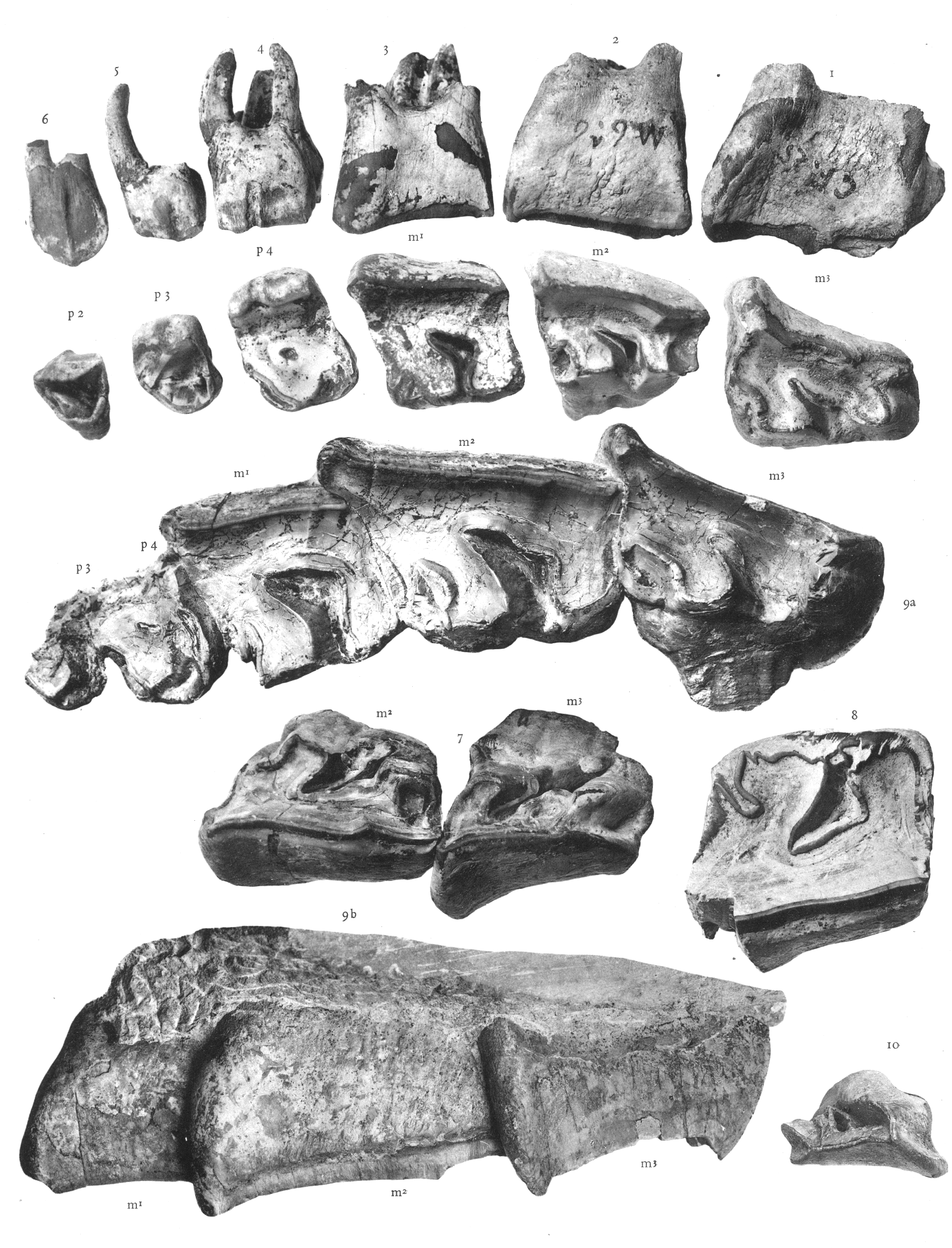
Fossil teeth from France, referred to C. minus (1–6, 10), C. cayluxi (7), and "C. nouleti" (8–9)

Gervais did not designate a type specimen for Cadurcotherium. His original description mentioned two upper third molars, and a later longer description included these two teeth as well as two lower molars which Gervais identified as the third lower molars. Later authors treated these four teeth collectively as the type specimens. In 1880, Henri Filhol published a very brief description of the new species Cadurcotherium minus, based on a lower premolar from the Quercy Phosphorites Formation. The type specimens of both C. cayluxi and C. minus are problematic. The French National Museum of Natural History keeps casts of Gervais's original specimens, and once noted that the original fossils were in the Natural History Museum of Montauban; modern searches have failed to find the fossils there. The measurements of the lower molars referred to C. cayluxi by Gervais are also more similar to the measurements of C. minus. Filhol never described the premolar of C. minus in detail, and never figured the specimen. It is also not clear how exactly Filhol measured the tooth. Modern searches have failed to find the original C. minus tooth, and the specimen is presumed to be lost.

In 1909, Frédéric Roman and Léonce Joleaud published the first major work on Cadurcotherium. Roman and Joleaud reexamined the fossils referred to the genus in greater detail, and published extensive descriptions of new fossils, including fragmentary jaws. Fossils were referred to both species described up until that time, and Roman and Joleaud also named the new species Cadurcotherium nouleti, based on a fragmentary maxilla from L'Isle-sur-la-Sorgue.

C. cayluxi, C. minus, and C. nouleti were reported from various sites in France over the course of the 20th century. In 1973, fossils from Carrascosa del Campo in central Spain were referred to C. nouleti by Miquel Crusafont i Pairó and Emiliano Aguirre. In 1982, E. Bahlo and H. Tobien reported remains of Cadurcotherium sp. from Alzey in Germany, though the fossil is in a private collection. In 2009, Damien Becker extended the known range of Cadurcotherium into modern-day Switzerland with the referral of a molar from Bressaucourt.

In 1985, Mirko Malez and Erich Thenius described the new species Cadurcotherium rakoveci, based on teeth and jaw fragments found in Ugljevik in modern-day Bosnia-Herzegovina, (Note: In his 2018 revision of the genus, Bernard Ménouret incorrectly placed Ugljevik (and thus also C. rakoveci) in Croatia. Ugljevik is in Bosnia-Herzegovina, and was correctly placed there in the original description of C. rakoveci by Mirko Malez and Erich Thenius.) the first record of an amynodont from southeastern Europe. A third molar was selected as the type specimen of C. rakoveci. The species was named after the paleontologist Ivan Rakovec, who had given several amynodont teeth to Thenius several years prior, identified as specimens of C. rakoveci in 1985.

==== More complete material, revisions ====
In 1995, Louis de Bonis described the first comprehensive fossil material of Cadurcotherium, from Le Garouillas in the Quercy Phosphorites. The fossils included limb bones and skulls, and for the first time allowed detailed study of cranial and postcranial anatomical features. The Le Garouillas fossils include five nearly complete skulls. The fossils are the largest single sample of Cadurcotherium fossils found. Since they are assumed to be from a single population, the Le Garouillas fossils also allowed assessments of the level of variation within Cadurcotherium itself. De Bonis noted that C. minus and C. nouleti were distinguished from C. cayluxi almost solely through their size. Given that few morphological features separate the three, de Bonis argued that both C. minus and C. nouleti may be junior synonyms of C. cayluxi.

In 2018, Bernard Ménouret described further postcranial fossils of Cadurcotherium and published a synthesis of the genus and its fossils from Europe, as well as a systematic revision. Ménouret designated C. nouleti as a junior synonym of C. cayluxi, but maintained C. minus as a distinct species. C. rakoveci and C. minus were found to be very close, possibly synonymous, with only slight differences separating them. The lower molars originally included as part of the four type teeth of C. cayluxi were formally reclassified as C. minus, restricting the type specimens of C. cayluxi to Gervais's original two teeth, represented by casts in the National Museum of Natural History. The type specimen of C. minus was presumed to be lost, and Ménouret proposed a neotype (replacement type) specimen: MNHN Qu 7255, a fragmentary jaw with a premolar with dimensions very close to the measurements published by Filhol in 1880.

=== Asia ===
In 1910, Guy Ellcock Pilgrim described the species Cadurcotherium indicum from the Bugti Hills of modern-day Pakistan. Pilgrim also reported the presence of C. indicum in the Pegu beds of Myanmar, based on two fragmentary molars. In 1938, Edwin H. Colbert referred the Myanmar teeth to Cadurcotherium sp., rather than treating them as an additional occurrence of C. indicum. In 1942, Miklós Kretzoi proposed that C. indicum should be transferred to a distinct genus, which he named Cadurcamynodon. Cadurcamynodon has since been treated as a synonym of Cadurcotherium. C. indicum is the latest known amynodont, and thus possibly the last living species of the family. Fossils of C. indicum have a long stratigraphic range, from the Early Oligocene to the latest Oligocene. The latest fossils were previously dated to the Early Miocene, though this has since proven incorrect.

The type species of the related genus Cadurcodon, Cadurcodon ardynensis, known from Kazakhstan, was originally named as a species of Cadurcotherium (Cadurcotherium ardynense) in 1923. Additional Kazakh amynodont species now referred to Cadurcodon, such as Cadurcodon zaisanensis and Cadurcodon kazakademius, have historically sometimes been treated as species of Cadurcotherium. The poorly known amynodont genus Hypsamynodon is sometimes treated as synonymous with Cadurcotherium; its single species H. progressus is thus sometimes referred to as Cadurcotherium progressus. Hypsamynodon is known from Late Eocene Mongolia; no fossils assigned to Cadurcotherium otherwise precede the Oligocene, and the genus (if Hypsamynodon is not considered a synonym) is not otherwise known from Mongolia.

In 1963, M. D. Biryukov named the new species Amynodon tuskabakensis, based on a single isolated third upper molar found in the Early Oligocene Kusto Formation in eastern Kazakhstan. Elizaveta Belyaeva referred "A". tuskabakensis to Hypsamynodon in 1971, while Spencer G. Lucas and Robert J. Emry (1996) treated it as a synonym of Cadurcodon ardynensis, found near the "A". tuskabakensis locality. In 2017, Averianov et al. were able to identify "A". tuskabakensis as a species of Cadurcotherium based on shared derived characteristics of the teeth, especially the presence of a posterioly directed protoloph, parallel to the ectoloph.

== Description ==
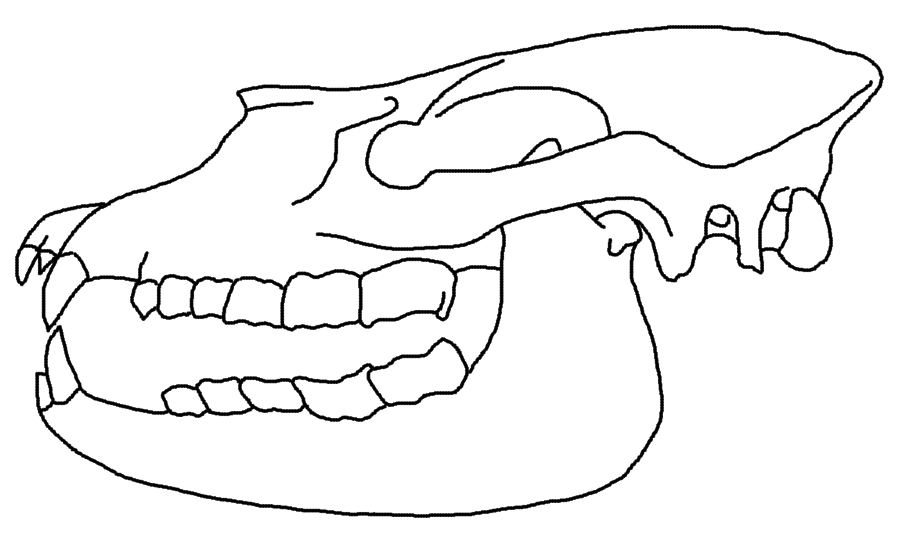
Reconstruction of the skull of C. cayluxi

Cadurcotherium varied in size depending on the species. C. indicum was a large amynodont, estimated to have weighed 1,832 kilograms (4,039 lb). If "C. nouleti" specimens are not considered, C. cayluxi was significantly smaller, at 830 kilograms (1,830 lb). The fossils formerly referred to "C. nouleti" indicate an animal comparable in size to C. indicum. C. minus was a smaller species, at 500–600 kilograms (1,100–1,300 lb).

Cadurcotherium had the dental formula 2.1.3.31.1.2.3. Dentally, Cadurcotherium is characterized by very hypsodont (high-crowned) cheek teeth, a greatly reduced metastyle on the third molar, very narrow lower molars, and the confluence of the anterior rib and parastyle on the molars.

Cadurcotherium may have had a rudimentary proboscis, as has been inferred for some of its close relatives, such as Amynodontopsis and especially Cadurcodon. The nasal region of its skull is relatively shortened, and two large fossae (grooves in front of the eye orbits) may indicate large muscles in the nasal region, perhaps supporting a proboscis. The maxillae of Cadurcotherium were less tall than those of Cadurcodon, which suggests that the proboscis, if it existed, was not as prominent as that in Cadurcodon.

The limited postcranial fossils of Cadurcotherium indicate that it did not have the robust hippopotamus-like build typical of some amynodonts, such as Metamynodon. Cadurcotherium had relatively elongated limbs. The metapodials (long bones of the front and hind feet) of Cadurcotherium did not differ significantly from those of modern rhinoceroses in their proportions.

== Classification ==
Classification of Cadurcotherium has historically been hampered by poor fossil material. Gervais compared the teeth of Cadurcotherium to those of rhinoceroses. Karl Alfred von Zittel was the first to recognize the teeth as those of an amynodont, placing Cadurcotherium in Amynodontidae in his Handbuch der Palaeontologie (1876–1893). Amynodontidae had been created as a family in 1883 by William Berryman Scott and Henry Fairfield Osborn to contain the then more well-preserved American genera Amynodon and Orthocynodon (since recognized as a synonym of Amynodon). Zittel based the amynodont identity of the fossil mainly on then newly found premolars, and, more dubiously, on canines and incisors that he assigned to the taxon on unclear grounds.

In 1896, Marcellin Boule described a fossil mandible, which allowed more detailed study of the dentition of Cadurcotherium. Boule linked Cadurcotherium to the South American Astrapotherium, and described it as "the only link between the Eocene fauna of Europe and South America". In 1909, Roman and Joleaud affirmed Zittel's classification of Cadurcotherium as an amynodont, though this time more reliably based on detailed descriptions of jaws and teeth. In 1921, Edward Leffingwell Troxell disagreed with the idea that Cadurcotherium was an amynodont, noting that figures of its teeth seemed "wholly inharmonious" with the amynodonts. In 1923, Henry Fairfield Osborn recognized Cadurcotherium as an amynodont.

In 1980, William P. Wall noted that Cadurcotherium may belong to the amynodont tribe Metamynodontini. Wall classified Cadurcotherium as a metamynodontine in 1989, as "the most derived stage achieved by the Metamynodontini", and the sister taxon of the North American genus Metamynodon. Following the description of more complete skull material of Cadurcotherium in 1995, de Bonis classified Cadurcotherium in the amynodont tribe Cadurcodontini, with which it shared more features. De Bonis noted that the supposed features shared with metamynodontines were either absent or probably acquired through convergent evolution. Modern phylogenetic analyses have also consistently recovered Caducotherium as a cadurcodontine amynodont.

The cladogram below presents the results of a phylogenetic analysis by Veine-Tonizzo et al. (2023):

- Amynodontidae
  - Rostriamynodon grangeri
  - - Amynodon advenus
    - - Sharamynodon mongoliensis
      - - Metamynodontini
          - - Paramynodon birmanicus
            - Megalamynodon regalis
          - - Sellamynodon zimborensis
            - - Metamynodon planifrons
              - UNISTRA.2015.0.1106
        - Cadurcodontini
          - - Zaisanamynodon protheroi
            - - Zaisanamynodon borisovi
              - ZSN-KKS-28-IPB
          - - - - Amynodontopsis bodei
                - Amynodontopsis jiyuanensis
              - - Cadurcotherium cayluxi
                - Cadurcotherium minus
            - - Cadurcodon bahoensis
              - - Cadurcodon maomingensis
                - - Cadurcodon ardynensis
                  - Cadurcodon kazakademius

== Paleoecology ==
Cadurcotherium has been interpreted as a mediportal (adapted for moderate speed and weight) mixed feeder (both grazing and foraging). Cadurcotherium appears to have preferred dry open woodland environments.
