= Judith Schiebout =

American paleontologist

- Occupation: paleontologist
- Known for: Study of prehistoric vertebrates

Dr. Judith Schiebout was an American paleontologist, and was an Adjunct Associate Professor of Geology at Louisiana State University and Curator of Vertebrate Paleontology at LSU Museum of Natural Science.

Schiebout earned a Bachelor of Arts in 1968, followed by a Master of Arts in 1970 and a Ph. D. in 1973, all from the University of Texas at Austin.

Schiebout's research focused on paleoecology and vertebrate paleontology, particularly the biostratigraphy and paleogeography of southern North America in the Cenozoic era. She researched mammals from the Middle and Late Cenozoic, the transitions occurring across the Cretaceous–Paleogene boundary, and the Paleocene and Eocene periods, especially the Paleocene–Eocene Thermal Maximum. She began her career working in Big Bend National Park in West Texas.

In the last 25 years of her life an aspect of Chinese vertebrate paleontology piqued her interests when Dr. Suyin Ting came to the United States to study, first under her direction and then alongside Dr. Schiebout as the collections manager for the vertebrate paleontology collections at LSU.

Her major interest involved mammals from the Miocene period of Louisiana. In the Middle Miocene of Louisiana, a diverse grouping of animals have been discovered consisting of terrestrial, freshwater, and marine vertebrates. Examples include rhinos, giant camels, whales, and gomphotheres. A late Miocene Site in the Tunica Hills was also under study.

Schiebout died on September 24, 2020, at the age of 74 due to complications from COVID-19.
