= Gigantamynodon =

Gigantamynodon Temporal range: Middle Eocene (Irdinmanhan)–Late Oligocene, 47.8–23 Ma Possible Early Miocene record
- Partial skull referred to Gigantamynodon, Anhui Geological Museum

Scientific classification
- Kingdom: Animalia
- Phylum: Chordata
- Class: Mammalia
- Order: Perissodactyla
- Superfamily: Rhinocerotoidea
- Family: †Amynodontidae
- Genus: †Gigantamynodon; Gromova, 1954

Type species
- †Gigantamynodon cessator Gromova, 1954

Other species
- †G. akespensis? Bayshashov, 1993; †G. giganteus Xu, 1961; †G. promisus Xu, 1966; †G. maguanensis Qi, 1992

Synonyms
- Genus synonymy: Zaisanamynodon? Belyaeva, 1971; Synonyms of G. cessator: Amynodon giganteus Gromova, 1958; G. cessador Qi, 1992 (lapsus calami); Synonyms of G. giganteus: G. gigsanteus Qi, 1992 (lapsus calami); Synonyms of G. promisus: G. promissus Lucas & Emry, 1996 (lapsus calami)

Extinct genus of mammals

Gigantamynodon ("giant Amynodon") is an extinct genus of amynodont that lived in East Asia, and perhaps Central Asia, from the Middle Eocene to the Late Oligocene. Several species of Gigantamynodon have been named, mostly based on fragmentary fossils of very large amynodonts found in China, Mongolia, and Kazakhstan. Because of the fragmentary fossils, the validity of Gigantamynodon has been called into question, though the genus continues to be routinely used. Morphologically, fossils referred to Gigantamynodon are similar to those of Zaisanamynodon, of which Gigantamynodon has been suggested to be a senior synonym.

Gigantamynodon was an extremely large amynodont, and the largest fossils suggest a size range similar to Zaisanamynodon. Other than extreme size, Gigantamynodon is poorly defined as a genus. It might be characterized by certain dental features, such as relatively large and hypsodont (high-crowned) teeth and enlarged tusk-like canines, but it is not clear if the dentition is consistent across the fossils referred to the genus.

== Research history ==
Partial skull referred to Gigantamynodon, Liuzhou Museum

Gigantamynodon cessator was described as a new genus and species by Vera Gromova in 1954. The new taxon was based on a fragment of a left dentary, preserving a third molar, found in the Ergilin Dzo Formation, at Khoer-Dzan, Mongolia. In addition to the dentary, Gromova also referred isolated upper premolars and incisors to G. cessator.

In 1961, Xu Yu-Xuan named a second species of Gigantamynodon, G. giganteus, based on fossils from the Caijiachong Formation in Yunnan, southwestern China. G. giganteus was based on a dentary fragment preserving the first to third molar, and an isolated upper premolar (both fossils are designated together as IVPP V.2594). Xu named a third species in 1966, G. promisus, based on fossils from the Shara Murun Formation of Inner Mongolia, northern China. G. promisus is known from a mandible, with the second premolar to third molar preserved (IVPP V.3218), as well as a large number of postcranial fossils (IVPP V.3218.1–28).

In 1977, Ding Suyin, Zheng Jiajian, Zhang Yuping, and Tong Yongsheng described a collection of mammal fossils from the Dongjun Formation in Guangxi, including isolated teeth which they referred to Gigantamynodon sp. In 1978, Wang Jingwen referred fragmentary fossils from Xixia in Henan to Gigantamynodon sp.

A fourth species of Gigantamynodon was named by Bolat Bayshashov in 1993, G. akespensis, based on another left dentary, preserving a damaged third molar (KAN PK 11/6), found in the Aral Formation near Akespe, near the northern shores of the Aral Sea. Bayshashov identified morphological similarities between KAN PK 11/6 and Gromova's original type fossil of G. cessator, which he used to justify referral to Gigantamynodon.

In 1992, Qi Tao named a fifth species of Gigantamynodon, G. maguanensis, based on a fragmentary right maxilla preserving the third premolar to second molar. The fossil had been sent by Zhang Jiafa, a staff member at the Cultural Museum of Maguan County, to the Institute of Vertebrate Paleontology and Paleoanthropology in 1989, and had apparently originally been found in a local (i.e. Maguan County, Yunnan) coal mine. Qi compared the fossil, belonging to a very large amynodont, to different species of Gigantamynodon, and determined that it belonged to a new species in the genus. Qi distinguished G. maguanensis from G. cessator by dental features, but noted that it could represent the same species as G. giganteus, also known from Yunnan, but that comparison was not possible since the type material does not overlap.

Qi (1992) believed that the species Amynodon giganteus, described by Gromova in 1958 based only on a third molar from the Ergilin Dzo Formation, should more appropriately be referred to Gigantamynodon. Later faunal overviews have considered Amynodon giganteus to be a specimen of G. cessator. In 2002, Ye Jie, Meng Jin, Wu Wen-Yu, and Wu Shao-Yuan referred a number of fragmentary and isolated teeth from the Late Eocene of Xinjiang, China to G. giganteus.

=== Validity ===
Life restoration of G. giganteus

In 1989, William P. Wall questioned the validity of Gigantamynodon. According to Wall, the name Gigantamynodon was used mainly by Chinese paleontologists, for large amynodonts similar in morphology to the genus Zaisanamynodon. Wall believed that only one of the two genera were likely to actually be valid. Although Gigantamynodon was named first, and would thus hold priority in the case of synonymization, Wall preferred to retain Zaisanamynodon and treat Gigantamynodon as a nomen dubium, "since Gromova's (1954) diagnosis is so poor". In 1996, Spencer G. Lucas and Robert J. Emry agreed with Wall that G. cessator should be considered a nomen dubium, adding that its holotype specimen was "not sufficient to diagnose a taxon", and may belong to any of several genera of large amynodonts, such as Zaisanamynodon.

If G. cessator is considered a nomen dubium, the taxonomic status of the other species referred to the genus is left uncertain. In 1996, Lucas and Emry noted that the G. giganteus type fossil is similar in size and morphology to Zaisanamynodon borisovi. Since G. giganteus is also based on a dentary, Lucas and Emry noted that it too may belong to several genera of large amynodonts, and could thus also be treated as a nomen dubium. Lucas and Emry did not believe that G. promisus belonged to Zaisanamynodon but were uncertain where to refer the species, noting that it was much smaller than Zaisanamynodon borisovi, and had large curved tusk-like canines that are not characteristic of that genus but known from some other amynodonts, such as Metamynodon. Lucas and Ermy reexamined KAN PK 11/6, and found numerous dental features that apparently precluded classification as an amynodont; instead, they proposed that G. akespensis actually represents a true rhinoceros, perhaps Aceratherium, Proaceratherium, or a similar genus. Lucas, Emry, and Bayshahov co-wrote a paper on Zaisanamynodon later in the same year, in which they included much of the same text, but omitted the previous discussion on G. akespensis, thus not commenting on the validity or identity of that species.

In 2017, Averianov and colleagues agreed with Wall, Lucas, and Emry, and considered G. cessator and G. giganteus to be nomina dubia due to a lack of diagnostic characters. Averianov and colleagues noted that upper molars found at the same locality as the G. giganteus type material, in the past identified as cf. Metamynodon sp., are likely to belong to the same taxon as G. giganteus. Averianov and colleagues considered G. maguanensis to be a nomen dubium.

Gigantamynodon has continued to be used as a valid genus by a large number of Chinese paleontologists. Tsubamoto et al. (2020) considered Gigantamynodon to be a nomen dubium, possibly synonymous with Zaisanamynodon, whereas Lopatin (2020) listed Gigantamynodon as a distinct genus.

== Description ==
Gigantamynodon was an extremely large amynodont, similar in size to Zaisanamynodon.

Beyond the great size and robusticity of the fossils, Gigantamynodon is poorly defined as a genus. Dentally, Gigantamynodon is noted to have had relatively large and hypsodont (high-crowned) teeth, and lower molars with relatively straight outer walls, without a longitudinal groove. G. promisus, much smaller than G. cessator and G. giganteus, notably had tusk-like canines, larger and more curved than those of Zaisanamynodon.

== Classification ==
In their 1997 Classification of Mammals: Above the Species Level, Malcolm McKenna and Susan K. Bell did not classify Gigantamynodon more specifically than in Amynodontidae, whereas Zaisanamynodon was classified in the derived clade Metamynodontina (equivalent to the tribe Metamynodontini used today). Zaisanamynodon, possibly congeneric at least in part with Gigantamynodon, was also classified in Metamynodontini by Wall in 1989, and by Lucas, Emry, and Bayshashov in 1996. 21st-century phylogenetic analyses have instead consistently recovered Zaisanamynodon in the tribe Cadurcodontini.

== Paleoecology ==
The earliest fossils of Gigantamynodon date to the Middle Eocene. The Dongjun Formation, which preserves fossils from G. sp., preserves a mammalian fauna that appears to correlate to the Irdinmanhan land mammal age. G. promisus is known from the Shara Murun Formation, which preserves the type fauna of the Sharamurunian land mammal age (Middle–Late Eocene). Both G. cessator and G. giganteus are from the Ergilin Dzo Formation, which preserves the type fauna of the succeeding Ergilian land mammal age (Late Eocene). The latest occurrences of Gigantamynodon have been dated to the Middle or Late Oligocene. G. maguanensis is assumed to have been Middle or Late Oligocene in age, though confident dating of the fossil is not possible since its locality is uncertain. Should G. akespensis be an amynodont, it may be the latest representative of the genus; the fauna of the Aral Formation has been dated to either the latest Oligocene, or earliest Miocene.

The Erlian Basin, in which the Shara Murun and Ergilin Dzo formations are situated, experienced a subtropical and humid climate during the Eocene. The vegetation was highly diverse and dominated by deciduous trees and shrubs. Perissodactyls were a dominant group in the Sharamurunian and Ergilian, particularly brontotheres and amynodonts. Tapiroids were not very diverse, and the first true rhinoceroses appeared during this time. Rodents were very diverse, with several groups, such as hedgehogs and shrews, making their first appearance in Asia in the Ergilian. Mesonychids were present but rare. Artiodactyls were diverse, and represented by anthracotheres, entelodonts, and various ruminants. The Ergilian fauna was in many ways a transitional fauna, which saw some faunal changes that heralded the quite different faunas of the Oligocene.

The Caijachong Formation was deposited under lacustrine conditions, and preserves a mammalian fauna including brontotheres, other amynodonts, and paraceratheres, as well as several artiodactyl groups, including anthracotheres, entelodonts, and ruminants. The Dongjun Formation preserves an earlier fauna, including anthracotheres, brontotheres, deperetellids, nimravids, paraceratheres, hyracodonts, pantodonts, other amynodonts, and the cetancodontamorph Andrewsarchus.

Gigantamynodon coexisted with several other amynodonts; in the Shara Murun Formation, fossils of several genera have been found, including Cadurcodon, Caenolophus, Lushiamynodon, and Sharamynodon. In the Ergilin Dzo Formation, Cadurcodon and Sharamynodon also occur, alongside Hypsamynodon and "Amynodon" lunanensis. In the Caijiachong Formation, Gigantamynodon fossils occur again with fossils of Cadurcodon, as well as fossils which have been referred to Metamynodon. In addition to Gigantamynodon, the Dongjun Formation also preserves fossils of "Amynodon" sp. and Paramynodon.
