= Rostriamynodon =

Rostriamynodon Temporal range: Middle Eocene (Irdinmanhan), 47.8–42.7 Ma
- Reconstruction of the type skull (AMNH 107635) of R. grangeri

Scientific classification
- Kingdom: Animalia
- Phylum: Chordata
- Class: Mammalia
- Order: Perissodactyla
- Superfamily: Rhinocerotoidea
- Family: †Amynodontidae
- Genus: †Rostriamynodon; Wall & Manning, 1986
- Species: †R. grangeri

Binomial name
- †Rostriamynodon grangeri Wall & Manning, 1986

Extinct genus of mammals

Rostriamynodon is an extinct genus of primitive amynodont that lived in East Asia during the Middle Eocene. The genus contains a single species, R. grangeri, known from the Irdin Manha Formation in Inner Mongolia, China. Rostriamynodon is known from better fossil material than other primitive amynodonts, and its status as a intermediate form is important for the study of rhinocerotoid evolution.

== Research history ==
Rostriamynodon grangeri was described by William P. Wall and Early Manning in 1986, based on a complete skull and mandible (AMNH 107635), found in the Irdin Manha Formation in Inner Mongolia, China. The provenance of AMNH 107635 is sometimes incorrectly given as the Arshan Formation. AMNH 107635 is slightly crushed. The lower dentition is relatively complete, but the upper dentition is more poorly preserved. Wall and Manning recognized Rostriamynodon as an important fossil for the study of rhinocerotoid evolution, as a geologically early and primitive amynodont, and thus an early intermediate form.

The name Rostriamynodon is derived from the Latin rostrum ("snout"), after the long preorbital (in front of the eyes) part of the skull, and the related genus Amynodon. The species name grangeri is in honor of the paleontologist Walter W. Granger.

== Description ==
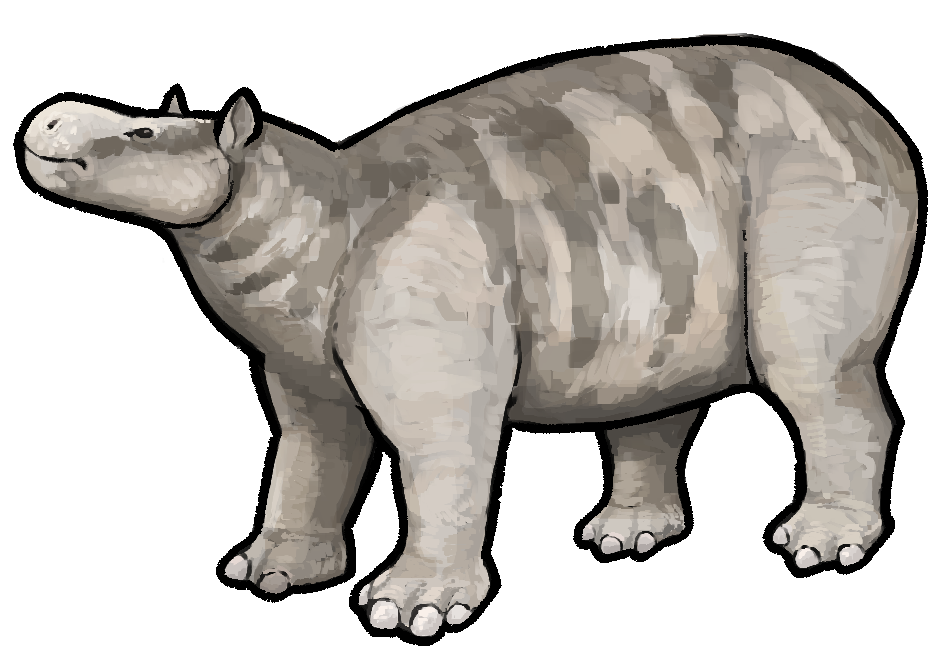
Life restoration of R. grangeri

Rostriamynodon was a small amynodont, with an estimated weight of 449 kilograms (990 lb) to 536.5 kilograms (1,183 lb). Rostriamynodon had the dental formula 3.1.3.33.1.3.3. The canines were much larger than the incisors, and within the size range seen in Amynodon.

Rostriamynodon had all of the major diagnostic features of amynodonts, such as a third upper molar with a quadratic outline, preorbital fossae (grooves in front of the eye orbits), and lacking both the lower and upper first premolar. In all other features, Rostriamynodon is more primitive than other amynodonts. The preorbital part of the skull of Rostriamynodon takes up about 42 % of the total length of the skull, longer than in any other known amynodont.

== Classification ==
Rostriamynodon is the earliest and most primitive well-defined amynodont. Other genera recognized as primitive amynodonts, Caenolophus and Teilhardia, are based on much more fragmentary fossils. Wall and Manning erected a new amynodont subfamily to contain Rostriamynodon, Rostriamynodontinae, and placed all more derived amynodonts in another subfamily, Amynodontinae. Rostriamynodontinae has since been considered a redundant taxon and is no longer in use.

Phylogenetic analyses consistently recover Rostriamynodon as a basal amynodont. The cladogram below follows an analysis by Veine-Tonizzo et al. (2023):

- Amynodontidae
  - Rostriamynodon grangeri
  - - Amynodon advenus
    - - Sharamynodon mongoliensis
      - - Metamynodontini
          - - Paramynodon birmanicus
            - Megalamynodon regalis
          - - Sellamynodon zimborensis
            - - Metamynodon planifrons
              - UNISTRA.2015.0.1106
        - Cadurcodontini
          - - Zaisanamynodon protheroi
            - - Zaisanamynodon borisovi
              - ZSN-KKS-28-IPB
          - - - - Amynodontopsis bodei
                - Amynodontopsis jiyuanensis
              - - Cadurcotherium cayluxi
                - Cadurcotherium minus
            - - Cadurcodon bahoensis
              - - Cadurcodon maomingensis
                - - Cadurcodon ardynensis
                  - Cadurcodon kazakademius
