= Lumeiyi Formation =

Geologic formation in Yunnan, China

- Stratigraphic range: Middle Eocene
- Type: Formation

Location
- Region: Yunnan
- Country: China

The Lumeiyi Formation is a geologic formation in Lunan, Yunnan, southwestern China. The precise age of the Lumeiyi Formation is not resolved more specifically than Middle Eocene, since the local fauna includes animals characteristic of both the Irdinmanhan and Sharamurunian land mammal ages.

The Lumeiyi Formation is divided into an Upper and Lower horizon, and the lower part of the Lumeiyi Formation is believed to be earlier in age than the upper part. Perissodactyls are especially dominant in both the lower and upper parts of the formation, though artiodactyls also increase in number in the upper part. The upper part of the Lumeiyi Formation may be roughly coeval in age with the Pondaung Formation in Myanmar.

== Fossil mammals ==
=== Artiodactyla ===
Genus/family	Species	Horizon	Notes/affinities	Images
Anthracotheriidae indet.		Lower (Lumeiyi-Lunan area)	An indeterminate anthracothere.	
Brachyodus?	B.? hui	Upper (Anyencun-Xiaoshahe area)	An anthracothere.	
Eoentelodon	E. yunnanense	Upper (Anyencun-Xiaoshahe area)	An entelodont.	
Gobiohyus	G. sp.	Lower (Lumeiyi-Lunan area)	A helohyid.	
Probrachyodus	P. panchiaoensis	Upper (Anyencun-Xiaoshahe area)	An anthracothere.	

=== Carnivora ===
Genus/family	Species	Horizon	Notes/affinities	Images
Canidae (or Miacidae) indet.		Upper (Anyencun-Xiaoshahe area)	A canid or miacid.	
Chailicyon	C. crassidens	Upper (Anyencun-Xiaoshahe area)	A miacid.	
Nimravidae indet.		Lower (Lumeiyi-Lunan area)	An indeterminate nimravid.	

=== Creodonta ===
Genus/family	Species	Horizon	Notes/affinities	Images
Creodonta indet.		Lower (Lumeiyi-Lunan area)	An indeterminate creodont.	

=== Hyaenodonta ===
Genus/family	Species	Horizon	Notes/affinities	Images
Orienspterodon	O. dahkoensis	Upper (Anyencun-Xiaoshahe area)	A hyainailourid. Previously referred to the genus Pterodon.	

=== Mesonychia ===
Genus/family	Species	Horizon	Notes/affinities	Images
Honanodon	H. sp.	Lower (Lumeiyi-Lunan area)	A mesonychid.	

=== Perissodactyla ===
Genus/family	Species	Horizon	Notes/affinities	Images
"Amynodon"	"A". altidens	Upper (Anyencun-Xiaoshahe area)	An amynodont. A. altidens, A. lunanensis, and other Asian fossils referred to Amynodon, are no longer considered to belong to the genus.	
"Amynodon"	"A". lunanensis	Lower (Lumeiyi-Lunan area)	An amynodont. A. altidens, A. lunanensis, and other Asian fossils referred to Amynodon, are no longer considered to belong to the genus.	
"Amynodon"	"A". spp.	Lower (Lumeiyi-Lunan area)	An amynodont. A. altidens, A. lunanensis, and other Asian fossils referred to Amynodon, are no longer considered to belong to the genus.	
Breviodon	B. lumeiyiensis	Lower (Lumeiyi-Lunan area)	A lophialetid (?).	
Breviodon	B. sahoensis	Upper (Anyencun-Xiaoshahe area)	A lophialetid (?).	
Caenolophus	C. medius	Lower (Lumeiyi-Lunan area)	A primitive amynodont.	
Caenolophus	C. sp.	Lower (Lumeiyi-Lunan area)	A primitive amynodont.	
Deperetella	D. dienensis	Upper (Anyencun-Xiaoshahe area)	A deperetellid.	
Deperetella	D. cf. similis	Upper (Anyencun-Xiaoshahe area)	A deperetellid.	
Deperetella	D. sp.	Lower (Lumeiyi-Lunan area)	A deperetellid.	
Dianotitan	D. lunanensis	Upper (Anyencun-Xiaoshahe area)	A brontothere.	
Eomoropus	E. cf. quadridentatus	Upper (Anyencun-Xiaoshahe area)	An eomoropid.	
Forstercooperia	F. totadentata	Upper (Anyencun-Xiaoshahe area)	A paracerathere. The Lumeiyi fossils of F. totadentata were previously referred to F. shiwopuensis, a junior synonym.	
Forstercooperia	F. sp.	Upper (Anyencun-Xiaoshahe area)	A paracerathere. The Lumeiyi fossils of F. totadentata were previously referred to F. shiwopuensis, a junior synonym.	
Forstercooperia	F. sp.	Lower (Lumeiyi-Lunan area)	A paracerathere. The Lumeiyi fossils of F. totadentata were previously referred to F. shiwopuensis, a junior synonym.	
Helaletes	H. mongoliensis	Lower (Lumeiyi-Lunan area)	A helaletid.	
Hyrachyus	H. lunanensis	Lower (Lumeiyi-Lunan area)	A primitive rhinocerotoid.	
Hyrachyus	H. minor	Lower (Lumeiyi-Lunan area)	A primitive rhinocerotoid.	
Ilianodon	I. lunanensis	Upper (Anyencun-Xiaoshahe area)	A hyracodont.	
"Indricotherium"?	"I".? sp.	Upper (Anyencun-Xiaoshahe area)	A paracerathere. Indricotherium is considered a synonym of Paraceratherium.	
Juxia	J. sp.	Upper (Anyencun-Xiaoshahe area)	A paracerathere.	
Litolophus	L.? ulterior	Upper (Anyencun-Xiaoshahe area)	An eomoropid.	
Lophialetes	L. expeditus	Lower (Lumeiyi-Lunan area)	A lophialetid.	
Lophialetes	L. cf. expeditus	Lower (Lumeiyi-Lunan area)	A lophialetid.	
Lophialetes	L. yunnanensis	Lower (Lumeiyi-Lunan area)	A lophialetid.	
Lunania	L. youngi	Lower (Lumeiyi-Lunan area)	An eomoropid.	
Lushiamynodon	L. menchiapuensis	Lower (Lumeiyi-Lunan area)	An amynodont.	
cf. Metamynodon		Upper (Anyencun-Xiaoshahe area)	An amynodont. Genus currently considered to have been restricted to North America.	
cf. Paramynodon		Upper (Anyencun-Xiaoshahe area)	An amynodont.	
Prohyracodon	P. progressa	Upper (Anyencun-Xiaoshahe area)	A hyracodont.	
Prohyracodon	P. meridionale	Upper (Anyencun-Xiaoshahe area)	A hyracodont.	
Prohyracodon	P. cf. orientale	Upper (Anyencun-Xiaoshahe area)	A hyracodont.	
Prohyracodon	P. sp.	Lower (Lumeiyi-Lunan area)	A hyracodont.	
Protitan?	P. cf. grangeri?	Lower (Lumeiyi-Lunan area)	A brontothere. Fossils originally referred to P. robustus, which is now considered a synonym of P. grangeri. The Lumeiyi Formation fossils have been argued to lack diagnostic features, making their assignment to Protitan doubtful.	
Protitan?	P. major?	Lower (Lumeiyi-Lunan area)	Non-diagnostic nomen dubium, may represent Metatitan and not Protitan.	
Rhinotitan	R. quadridens	Upper (Anyencun-Xiaoshahe area)	A brontothere. R. quadridens is a nomen dubium that may not belong to Rhinotitan.	
Rhinotitan	R. sp.	Lower (Lumeiyi-Lunan area)	A brontothere. R. quadridens is a nomen dubium that may not belong to Rhinotitan.	
Rhinotitan	R. sp.	Upper (Anyencun-Xiaoshahe area)	A brontothere. R. quadridens is a nomen dubium that may not belong to Rhinotitan.	
Rhodopagus	R. pygmaeus	Lower (Lumeiyi-Lunan area)	A rhodopagid.	
Rhodopagus	R. minimus	Lower (Lumeiyi-Lunan area)	A rhodopagid.	
Teilhardia	T. pretiosa	Lower (Lumeiyi-Lunan area)	A primitive amynodont.	
Teilhardia	T.? sp.	Lower (Lumeiyi-Lunan area)	A primitive amynodont.	
Teleolophus	T. medius	Upper (Anyencun-Xiaoshahe area)	A deperetellid.	
Teleolophus	T. cf. magnus	Upper (Anyencun-Xiaoshahe area)	A deperetellid.	
Teleolophus	T.? rectus	Upper (Anyencun-Xiaoshahe area)	A deperetellid.	
Teleolophus	T. sp.	Lower (Lumeiyi-Lunan area)	A deperetellid.	
Urtinotherium	U. parvum	Upper (Anyencun-Xiaoshahe area)	A paracerathere. U. parvum has historically sometimes been referred to Indricotherium (=Paraceratherium).	
Urtinotherium	U. cf. parvum	Upper (Anyencun-Xiaoshahe area)	A paracerathere. U. parvum has historically sometimes been referred to Indricotherium (=Paraceratherium).	

=== Tillodontia ===
Genus/family	Species	Horizon	Notes/affinities	Images
Tillodontia indet.		Lower (Lumeiyi-Lunan area)	An indeterminate tillodont.	
