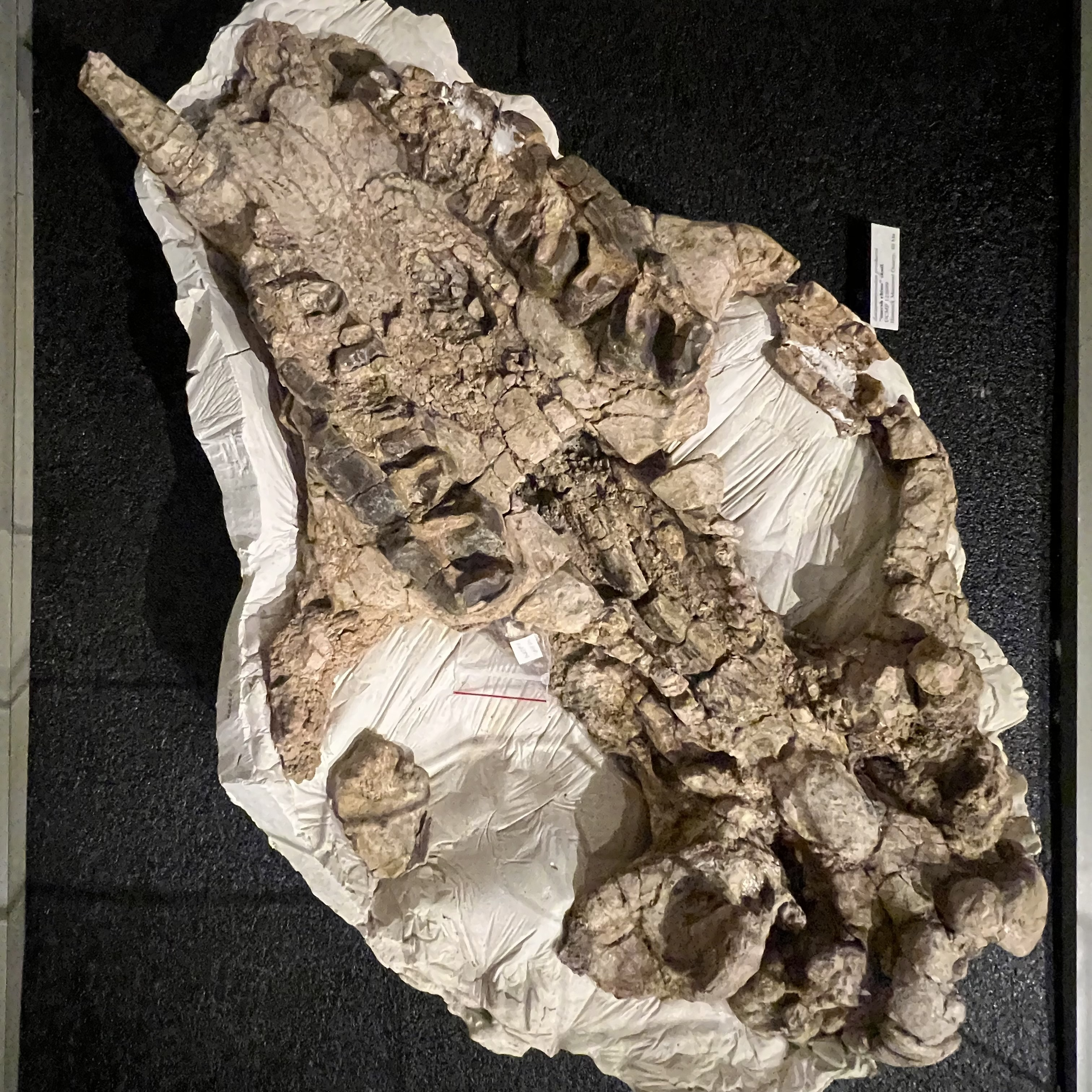
- Skull of Z. protheroi, John Day Fossil Beds National Monument

Scientific classification
- Kingdom: Animalia
- Phylum: Chordata
- Class: Mammalia
- Order: Perissodactyla
- Superfamily: Rhinocerotoidea
- Family: †Amynodontidae
- Tribe: †Cadurcodontini
- Genus: †Zaisanamynodon; Belyaeva, 1971

Type species
- †Zaisanamynodon borisovi Belyaeva, 1971

Other species
- †Z. protheroi Lucas, 2006

Synonyms
- Genus synonymy: Gigantamynodon? Gromova, 1954; Procadurcodon Gromova, 1960; Synonyms of Z. protheroi: Procadurcodon orientalis Gromova, 1960

= Zaisanamynodon =

Zaisanamynodon Temporal range: Late Eocene (Bartonian–Priabonian (Note: Fossils of Zaisanamynodon borisovi from China are of Ergilian age. The Ergilian is dated to c. 37.8–33.9 Ma, corresponding closely to the Priabonian age. The date of the type locality of Z. borisovi in Kazakhstan is also Ergilian. Spencer, Emry, and Bayshahov (1996) suggested that Zaisanamynodon could represent an index taxon for the Ergilian. Zaisanamynodon fossils in Japan are dated to c. 38 Ma. The fossils of Z. protheroi are Bartonian in age, making it older than Z. borisovi.)), 42.7–33.9 Ma

Extinct genus of mammals

Zaisanamynodon is an extinct genus of amynodont that lived in Central Asia, East Asia, and North America during the Late Eocene. Two species of Zaisanamynodon are recognized: the type species Z. borisovi, known from the Priabonian of Kazakhstan and China, and the earlier Z. protheroi, known from the Bartonian of Russia, the United States, and perhaps Japan.

Zaisanamynodon is the largest known amynodont. Z. borisovi reached an estimated body mass of 2,720 kilograms (6,000 lb), making it comparable in size to the modern white rhinoceros. Z. protheroi was only slightly smaller, at 2,442 kilograms (5,384 lb).

== Research history ==
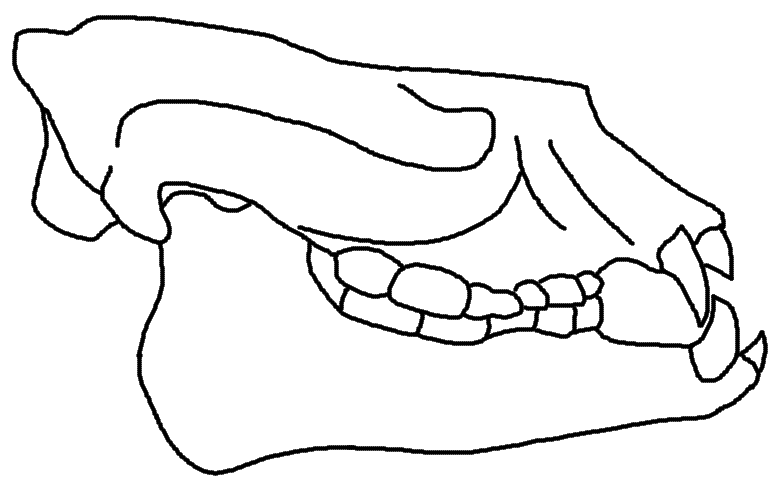
Reconstruction of the skull of Z. borisovi

Zaisanamynodon borisovi was described by Elizaveta Belyaeva in 1971. Belyaeva based Z. borisovi on the partial skeleton ANPIN 2761/1-22, found in northeastern Kazakhstan, in the Zaysan Basin. ANPIN 2761/1-22 preserves much of one of the forelimbs and most of the cervical vertebrae, the lower jaw, and an incomplete skull.

In 1989, William P. Wall suggested the genus Gigantamynodon could be a synonym of Zaisanamynodon; Wall found the original diagnosis of Gigantamynodon to be poorly done, and believed it was more likely that only a single genus of giant amynodonts were present in East Asia. Gigantamynodon was described in 1954, before Zaisanamynodon, and would thus be the oldest available (and thus valid) name of the taxon in the event of synonymization. Because of the poor diagnosis, Wall chose to instead designate Gigantamanynodon as a nomen dubium.

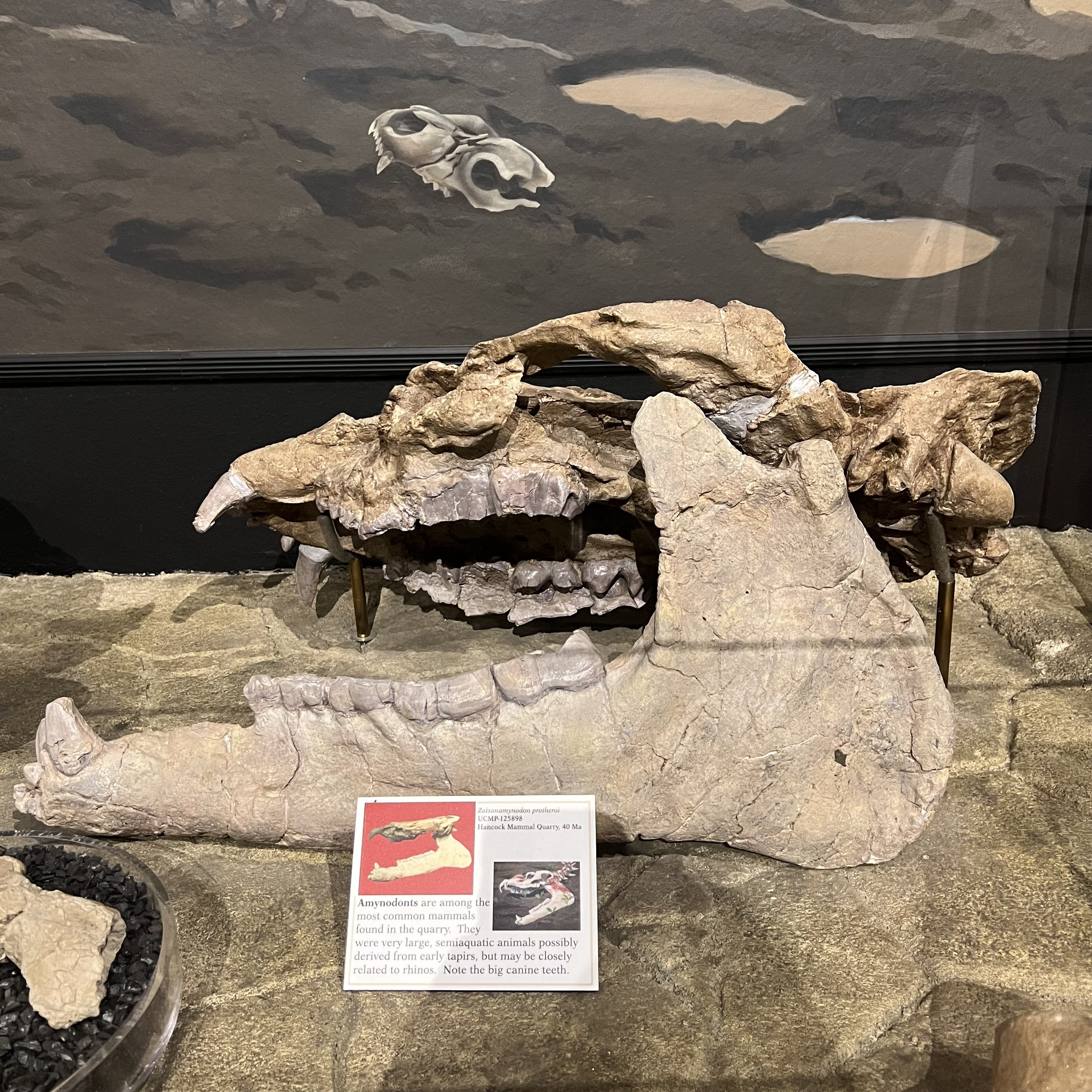
Skull and jaw of Z. protheroi

No additional fossils of Zaisanamynodon were reported until 1996, when Spencer G. Lucas, Robert J. Emry, and Bolat U. Bayshashov described new Z. borisovi fossils from Inner Mongolia in China, including skulls, jaws, and fragmentary fossils. The new fossils were found at various localities, in three different geological formations: the Ulan Gochu Formation, Baron Sog Formation, and Houldjin Formation. Lucas, Emry, and Bayshashov followed Wall in treating Gigantamynodon as a nomen dubium, based on an undiagnostic type specimen. G. cessator (the type species) from Mongolia and G. giganteus from Inner Mongolia were noted to possibly represent Zaisanamynodon, though they could just as likely belong to some other large amynodont. Some Gigantamynodon species certainly do not belong to Zaisanamynodon, such as G. promissus from Inner Mongolia, distinguished by large, curved tusks, and G. akespensis, from Kazakhstan, which has been found to have been a rhinocerotid.

In 2006, Lucas described a second species of Zaisanamynodon, Z. protheroi, based on fossils from the Late Eocene of Oregon, in the United States. The Z. protheroi fossils were previously referred to the genus Procadurcodon. Procadurcodon, and its type and only species P. orientalis, were described by Gromova in 1960, based on Late Eocene fossils from Primorsky Krai, Russia. Lucas considered P. orientalis to be a nomen dubium and assigned its type fossils to Z. protheroi.

Fragmentary fossils from the Yokawa Formation in Japan have been referred to Zaisanamynodon, and may belong to Z. protheroi. Fragmentary fossils of Z. borisovi have also been reported from the Late Eocene of Japan, though their classification has been called into question.

Averianov et al. (2018) disagreed with Lucas and considered Procadurcodon orientalis to be a valid species, and Z. protheroi to be either a junior synonym of P. orientalis, or a distinct species of Procadurcodon (rather than Zaisanamynodon). Tissier et al. (2018) agreed with Lucas, considering Z. protheroi to be valid and P. orientalis to be a nomen dubium, or nomen vanum. Veine-Tonizzo et al. (2023) also agreed with Lucas and designated Procadurcodon as a nomen nudum.

In 2023, Veine Tonizzo et al. described a new fragmentary skull of Z. borisovi, ZSN-KKS-28-IPB, found near the locality of the Z. borisovi type specimen.

== Description ==
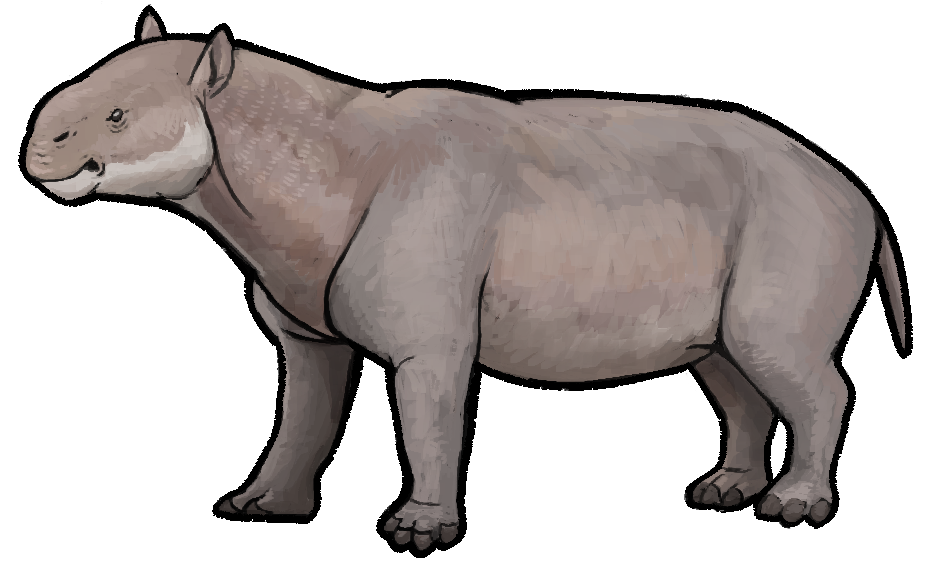
Life restoration of Z. protheroi

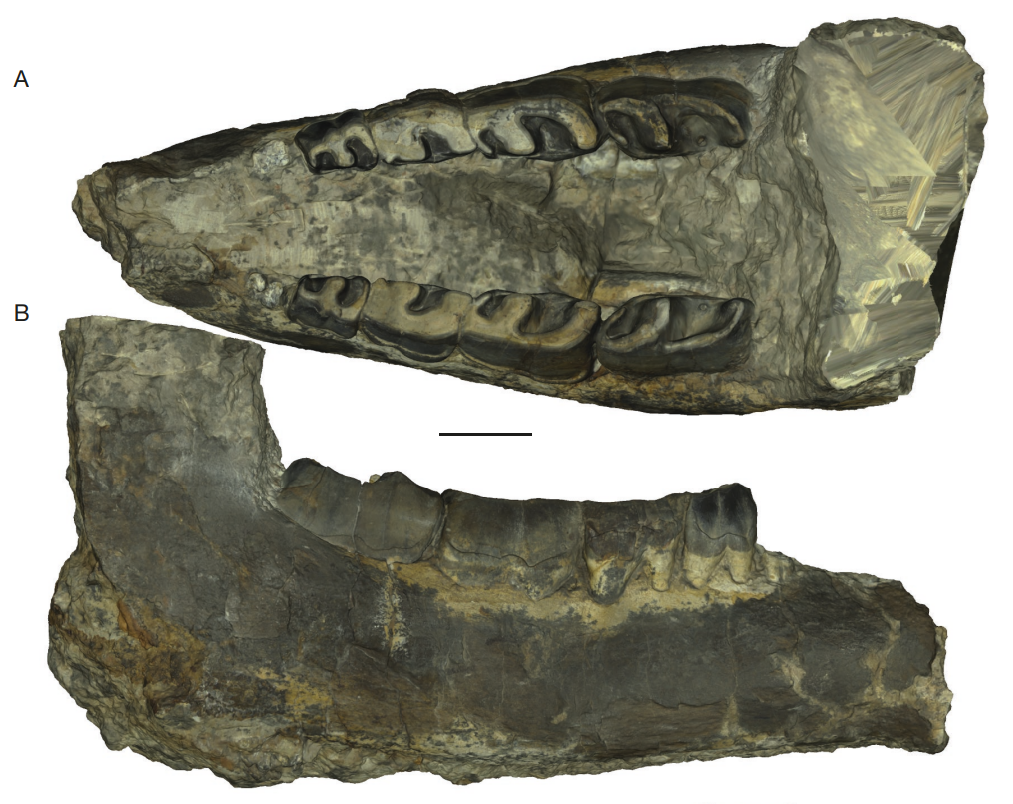
Mandible of Z. borisovi

Zaisanamynodon is the largest known amynodont. Z. protheroi reached an estimated body mass of 2,720 kilograms (6,000 lb) and Z. borisovi reached an estimated body mass of 2442 ± 257 kg (5,384 ± 567 lb).

Several derived amynodonts had brachycephalic (wide relative to its length) skulls due to enlarged zygomatic arches. Zaisanamynodon had the most brachycephalic skull of all known amynodonts, with massive zygomatic arches.

Zaisanamynodon had the dental formula 3.1.3.33.1.2.3. Zaisanamynodon can be distinguished dentally from all other amynodonts by the presence of a third posterior loph on the fourth premolar.

== Classification ==
In 1989, Wall classified Zaisanamynodon as a metamynodontine amynodont, and as the sister taxon of a clade formed by the genera Metamynodon and Cadurcotherium. Lucas, Emry, and Bayshashov (1996) followed Wall in classifying Zaisanamynodon as a metamynodontine. 21st-century phylogenetic analyses have consistently recovered Zaisanamynodon and Cadurcotherium as cadurcodontines instead.

The cladogram below presents the results of a phylogenetic analysis by Veine-Tonizzo et al. (2023). The skull ZSN-KKS-28-IPB is featured separately in the cladogram, but was referred to Z. borisovi in the paper.

- Amynodontidae
  - Rostriamynodon grangeri
  - - Amynodon advenus
    - - Sharamynodon mongoliensis
      - - Metamynodontini
          - - Paramynodon birmanicus
            - Megalamynodon regalis
          - - Sellamynodon zimborensis
            - - Metamynodon planifrons
              - UNISTRA.2015.0.1106
        - Cadurcodontini
          - - Zaisanamynodon protheroi
            - - Zaisanamynodon borisovi
              - ZSN-KKS-28-IPB
          - - - - Amynodontopsis bodei
                - Amynodontopsis jiyuanensis
              - - Cadurcotherium cayluxi
                - Cadurcotherium minus
            - - Cadurcodon bahoensis
              - - Cadurcodon maomingensis
                - - Cadurcodon ardynensis
                  - Cadurcodon kazakademius
