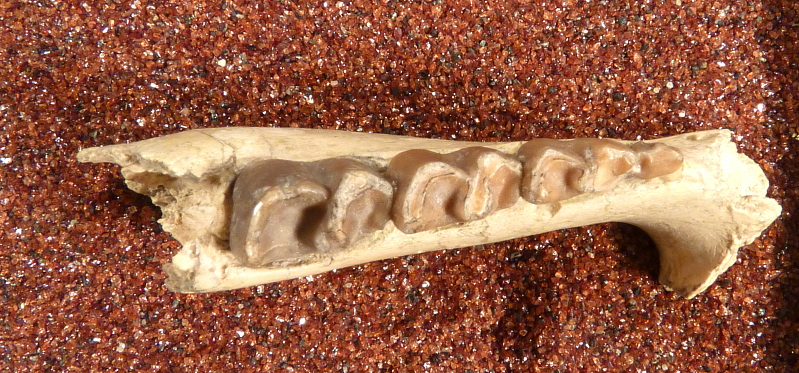
- Mandible of T. hunteri, National Museum of Natural History

Scientific classification
- Kingdom: Animalia
- Phylum: Chordata
- Class: Mammalia
- Order: Perissodactyla
- Family: incertae sedis
- Genus: †Toxotherium; Wood, 1961

Type species
- †Toxotherium hunteri Wood, 1961

Other species
- †T. woodi Skinner & Gooris, 1966

= Toxotherium =

Toxotherium Temporal range: Late Eocene (Chadronian), 37–33.7 Ma

Extinct genus of mammals

Toxotherium is an extinct genus of perissodactyl of uncertain affinities that lived in North America during the Late Eocene, in the Chadronian land mammal age. Two species of Toxotherium are recognized, T. hunteri from the Cypress Hills Formation and the Flagstaff Rim and T. woodi from the White River Formation and Cypress Hills Formation. Both species are known only from partial lower jaws. Toxotherium was a very small perissodactyl, with a brachycephalic (short and broad) face and large, tusk-like canines.

== Research history ==
Toxotherium is known only from anterior fragments of mandibles, found in Early Oligocene and possibly Late Eocene strata. The type species, Toxotherium hunteri, was described by Horace Elmer Wood in 1961, based on a fragmentary mandible from the Cypress Hills Formation in Saskatchewan, Canada. Since 1961, similar fragmentary lower jaws referred to T. hunteri have also been found in United States, in the White River Formation in Wyoming.

A second species of Toxotherium, T. woodi, was described by Shirley M. Skinner and Raymond J. Gooris in 1966, based on a mandible fragment found in 1958 in Natrona County, Wyoming.

== Description ==
Toxotherium was a very small perissodactyl. Toxotherium had a rhinocerotoid molar pattern, a shortened series of premolars, and greatly enlarged and procumbent tusk-like canine teeth. Based on the reduced premolars and the relatively deep posterior ramus, Toxotherium must have had a very brachycephalic (relatively short and broad) face.

== Classification ==
The affinities of Toxotherium are unclear. Different paleontologists have variously classified Toxotherium as a tapiroid, incertae sedis within Rhinocerotoidea, a hyracodont, an amynodont. The brachycephalic face, and procumbent tusk derived from the canine, suggest amynodont affinities. The tusk of Toxotherium is relatively heavier and more pronounced than the tusks of all known amynodonts. The ossified external auditory meatus in Toxotherium has been suggested to rule out classification in Amynodontidae, and to more closely resemble Triplopus.

In 1966, Skinner and Gooris suggested that Toxotherium could be placed in a new subfamily, or perhaps even family, of rhinocerotoids. In 1986, Donald Prothero, Earl Manning, and Bruce Hanson suggested that Toxotherium could represent a lophiodont, a group predominantly known from Europe, though this suggestion was partially based on a controversial placement of the lophiodonts inside Tapiroidea. Koenigswald, Holbrook & Rose (2011) classified Toxotherium as incertae sedis within Perissodactyla.

== Paleoecology ==
The Cypress Hills and White River formations contain fossils of highly diverse faunas. The climate of Late Eocene Saskatchewan was much warmer than today; several reptiles known from the Cypress Hills Formation indicate a subtropical climate, whereas plant fossils suggest a temperate or warm-temperate climate. Over 40 mammal families are represented in the Cypress Hills fossil assemblage. The White River Formation also represents a warm and humid environment, likely dominated by woodland-savannas and woody scrublands. The White River badlands preserve perhaps the best Late Eocene fossil record in North America, the so-called White River Fauna.
