= Hypsamynodon =

Hypsamynodon Temporal range: Late Eocene (Ergilian), 37.8–33.9 Ma

Scientific classification
- Kingdom: Animalia
- Phylum: Chordata
- Class: Mammalia
- Order: Perissodactyla
- Superfamily: Rhinocerotoidea
- Family: †Amynodontidae
- Genus: †Hypsamynodon; Gromova, 1954
- Species: †H. progressus

Binomial name
- †Hypsamynodon progressus Gromova, 1954

Synonyms
- Cadurcotherium progressus (Gromova, 1954)

Extinct genus of mammals

Hypsamynodon ("high Amynodon") is an extinct genus of amynodont that lived in East Asia during the Late Eocene, in the Ergilian land mammal age. A single species of Hypsamynodon is recognized, H. progressus, known only from isolated teeth found in the Ergilin Dzo Formation of Mongolia.

Because of the limited fossil material, Hypsamynodon is poorly understood, and it is mainly characterized by its hypsodont (high-crowned) cheek teeth. The genus has been treated as a problematic taxon, and has been suggested to be a junior synonym of Cadurcotherium. The fragmentary fossils make comparisons difficult, and Cadurcotherium is not otherwise known from either Mongolia or the Eocene.

== Research history ==
Hypsamynodon progressus was described by Vera Gromova in 1954, based on a few isolated upper molar teeth found in the Late Eocene Ergilin Dzo Formation of Mongolia. Gromova characterized Hypsamynodon by its hypsodont (high-crowned) cheek teeth, and the "near confluence of the anterior rib and parastyle on the molars".

In 1971, Elizaveta Belyaeva referred the species "Amynodon" tuskabakensis to Hypsamynodon (as Hypsamynodon tuskabakensis). "A". tuskabakensis was described by M. D. Biryukov in 1963, based on a single isolated third upper molar from the Early Oligocene Kusto Formation in eastern Kazakhstan. In 2017, Averianov et al. were instead able to identify "A". tuskabakensis as a species of Cadurcotherium, based on shared derived characteristics of the teeth, especially the presence of a posteriorly directed protoloph, parallel to the ectoloph (both the protoloph and ectoloph are ridges of the tooth).

=== Validity ===
In the 1980s, William P. Wall considered synonymizing Hypsamynodon with Cadurcotherium. The hypsodont teeth and the near confluence of the anterior rib and parastyle are features that Hypsamynodon share with Cadurcotherium. Another feature shared with Cadurcotherium, not mentioned by Gromova in her description of H. progressus but visible in her figures of the teeth, is a greatly reduced metaloph (another ridge) on the third upper molar. Wall ultimately preferred not to synonymize Hypsamynodon with Cadurcotherium, awaiting better fossil material. Cadurcotherium is otherwise known mainly from Europe, though fossils have also been found in Pakistan and Kazakhstan. With the possible exception of Hypsamynodon, all known Cadurcotherium fossils are restricted to the Oligocene and there is no record of the genus in the Eocene.

Assessments on Hypsamynodon have varied since the 1980s. In 1996, Spencer G. Lucas and Robert J. Emry treated Hypsamynodon as a synonym of Cadurcotherium. Wang et al. (2009) treated Hypsamynodon as a valid genus, Averianov et al. (2017) treated it as a "problematic taxon" but did not designate it as a synonym of Cadurcotherium, and Bai et al. (2020) treated it as a valid genus. In a 2022 review of the Ergilin Dzo fauna, Tsubamoto et al. listed H. progressus as Cadurcotherium progressus.

== Description ==
Hypsamynodon is mainly characterized by its hypsodont cheek teeth.

== Classification ==
In their 1997 Classification of Mammals: Above the Species Level, Malcolm McKenna and Susan K. Bell did not classify Hypsamynodon more specifically than in Amynodontidae, whereas Cadurcotherium was classified in the derived clade Cadurcotheriina (equivalent to the tribe Cadurcodontini used today).

== Paleoecology ==
The Erlian Basin, in which the Ergilin Dzo Formation is situated, experienced a subtropical and humid climate during the Eocene. The vegetation was highly diverse and dominated by deciduous trees and shrubs. During the Ergilian, the region was undergoing a gradual transition from dense forests to more steppe-like environments that would appear in the Oligocene, but had not yet transitioned into forest steppe. The Ergilin Dzo Formation preserves a highly diverse fossil fauna; over a hundred species have been identified, out of which over 80 are mammals. Perissodactyls were a dominant group in the Ergilian, particularly amynodonts and brontotheres. Other perissodactyl groups represented included paraceratheres, hyracodonts, chalicotherioids, rhinoceroses, and tapiroids. Artiodactyls were represented by entelodonts, anthracotheres, and ruminants. Contemporary predators included a variety of groups, such as nimravids (Nimravus), hyaenodonts (Hyaenodon), and mesonychids (Mongolestes and Metahapalodectes).
