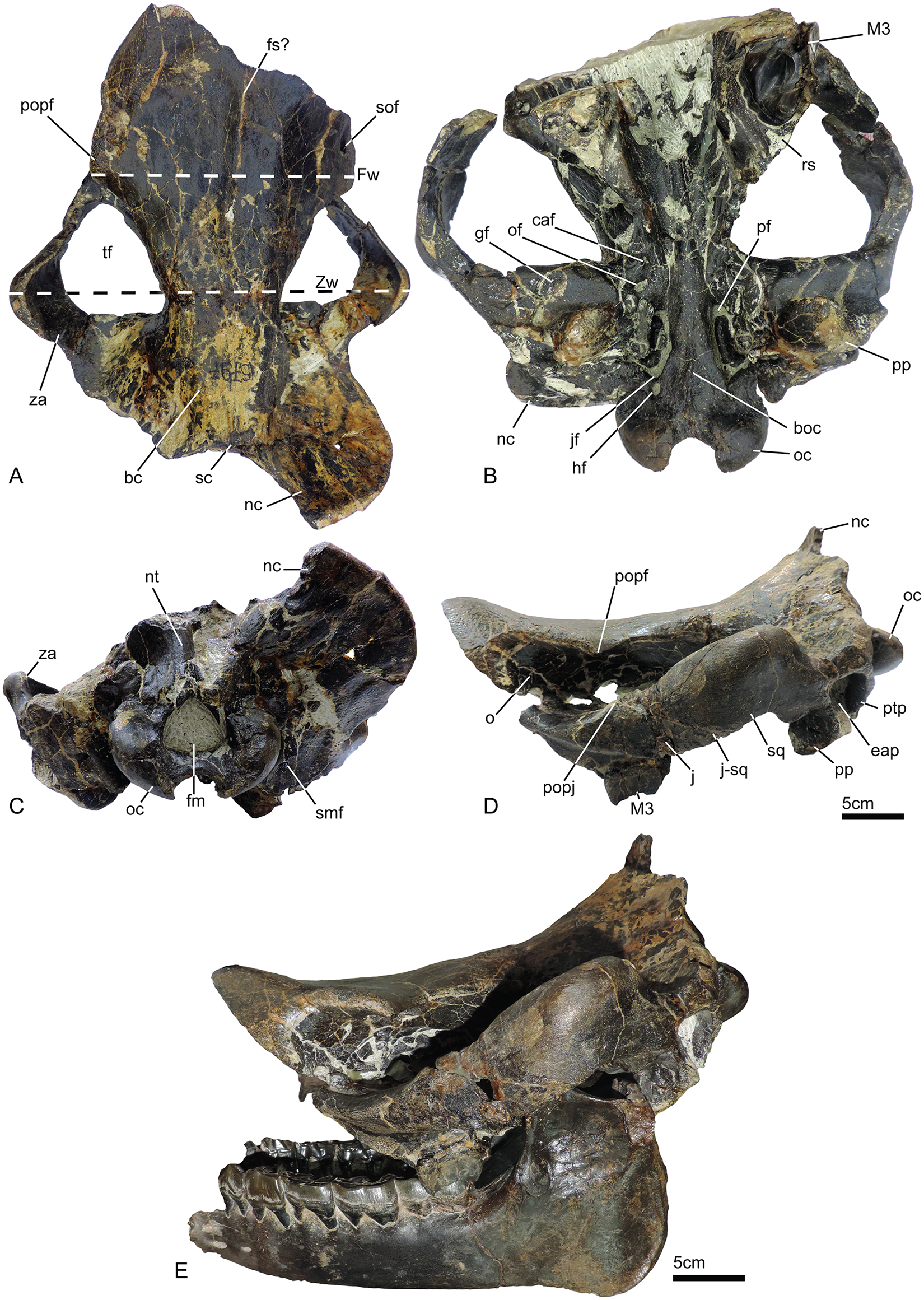
- Partial skull and holotype mandible (UBB MPS 15795) of S. zimborensis

Scientific classification
- Kingdom: Animalia
- Phylum: Chordata
- Class: Mammalia
- Order: Perissodactyla
- Superfamily: Rhinocerotoidea
- Family: †Amynodontidae
- Tribe: †Metamynodontini
- Genus: †Sellamynodon; Tissier et al., 2018
- Species: †S. zimborensis

Binomial name
- †Sellamynodon zimborensis (Codrea & Şuraru, 1989) [originally Cadurcodon]

Synonyms
- Cadurcodon zimborensis Codrea & Şuraru, 1989

= Sellamynodon =

Sellamynodon Temporal range: Late Eocene or Early Oligocene

Extinct genus of mammals

Sellamynodon ("saddle Amynodon") is an extinct genus of amynodont that lived in Eastern Europe during the Late Eocene or Early Oligocene. A single species of Sellamynodon has been described, S. zimborensis, known from a skull and mandible found in Transylvania, Romania.

Sellamynodon was a medium-sized amynodont, estimated to have reached a body mass of 410–550 kilograms (900–1,210 lb). Phylogenetic analyses recover Sellamynodon as a metamynodont amynodont, and it represents the westernmost known occurrence of that group, and a close relative of the North American Metamynodon. Several features distinguish Sellamynodon from all other known amynodonts, most notably its greatly expanded nuchal crest, the absence of a sagittal crest, and its uniquely saddle-shaped skull, from which the genus gets its name.

== Research history ==
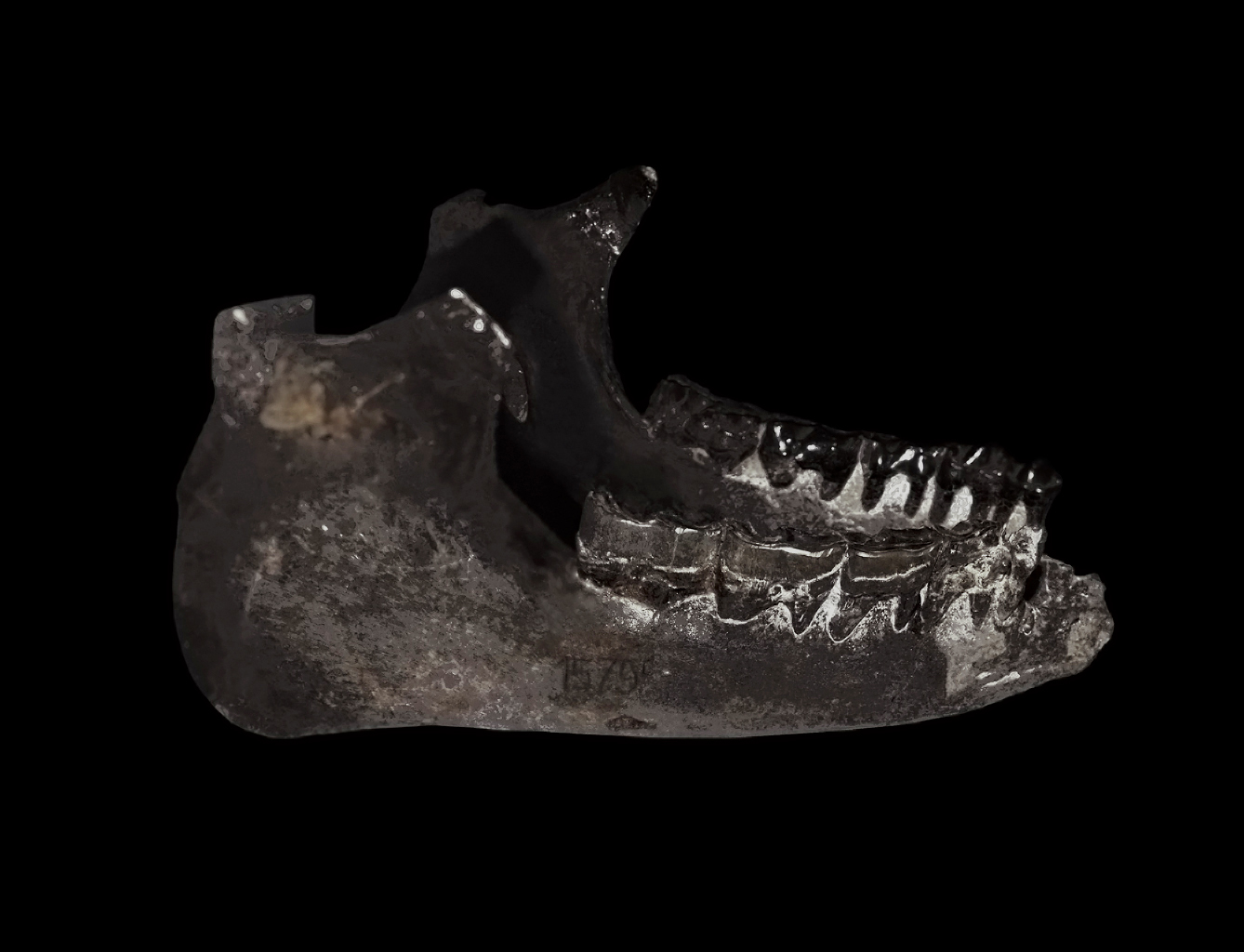
The original S. zimborensis mandible (UBB MPS 15795), at the Museum of Paleontology and Stratigraphy of Babeș-Bolyai University

Cadurcodon zimborensis was described by Vlad Codrea and Nicolae Şuraru in 1989, based on a fossil mandible (UBB MPS 15795) donated to the Babeș-Bolyai University some years prior by a private fossil collector. After the mandible was prepared out of a sandstone block, Codrea and Şuraru compared it mainly to amynodont fossils belonging to the genera Cadurcodon and Paracadurcodon, and chose to provisionally describe it as belonging to a new species of Cadurcodon. Codrea and Şuraru noted that the dentition appeared to combine derived features with some retained archaic ones, and that the species may turn out to belong to a new amynodont genus.

Codrea and Şuraru gave the provenance of the mandible as Bisericii Hill in the Zimbor Strata, near Zimbor in Sălaj County, Romania, and dated the fossil to the Late Oligocene. The species name zimborensis is derived from Zimbor. In 2000, Codrea corrected the provenance of the fossil to Dobârca, in Sibiu County. In 2018, Jérémy Tissier et al. mentioned that the matrix counter-impression of the original mandible had recently been rediscovered, and was labelled as "Dobârca". The strata at Dobârca from which the mandible was found are not precisely dated, but are considered to be either Late Eocene or Early Oligocene in age.

In 2018, Tissier et al. described a partial amynodont skull from Dobârca. This previously unpublished skull, also kept at the Babeș-Bolyai University, was unexpectedly found to articulate perfectly with UBB MPS 15795, and Tissier et al. (2018) thus concluded that the two fossils were associated and belonged to the same individual animal. The skull and mandible are thus treated together under the single specimen number UBB MPS 15795.

Based on the associated skull, Tissier et al. (2018) were able to determine that the skull of C. zimborensis had several highly unique features among the amynodonts, most notably a greatly expanded nuchal crest and a saddle-shaped profile, more reminiscent of the shape of skulls of derived brontotheres than those of other amynodonts. The species was thus transferred to a new genus, as had been suspected as plausible by Codrea and Şuraru in 1989. Tissier et al. (2018) named the new genus Sellamynodon, after the Latin sella ("saddle", in reference to the shape of the skull) and the suffix -amynodon (after the genus Amynodon), commonly used for amynodont genera.

== Description ==
Sellamynodon was a medium-sized amynodont, similar in size to the primitive Rostriamynodon and certain specimens of Amynodon and Amynodontopsis. Based on the size and dimensions of the first lower molar, Tissier et al. (2018) estimated the body mass of S. zimborensis to be around 550 kilograms (1,210 lb). Estimates based on the length of the ectolophs of the third lower molar yielded a smaller estimated mass, around 410 kilograms (900 lb).

=== Skull and jaw ===
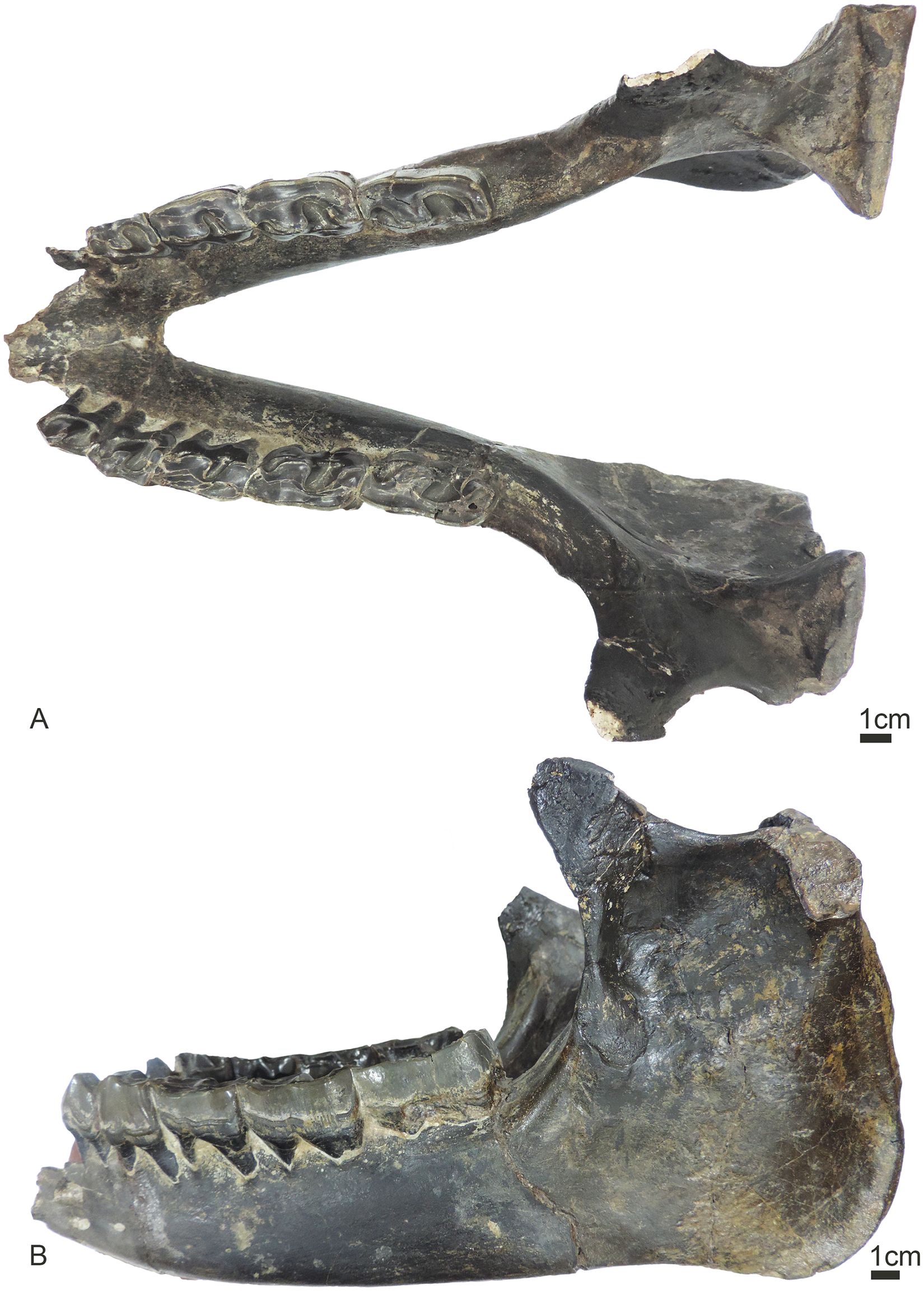
Additional views of the mandible (UBB MPS 15795)

The dorsal surface of the skull of Sellamynodon was deeply concave, giving the skull a distinct saddle-shaped profile. This shape is highly unique among amynodonts, since amynodont skulls are normally quite flat, and in some species even slightly convex. The nuchal crest of Sellamynodon was also greatly expanded, much more than in all other known amynodonts. The only known amynodont which may have had a homologous development is the much larger Zaisanamynodon, which had a lambdoidal crest, though this feature is not as developed in Zaisanamynodon. The saddle-shaped profile and developed nuchal crest of Sellamynodon are more reminiscent of the skull morphology of derived brontotheres such as Diplacodon, than to other known amynodonts. The zygomatic arches of Sellamynodon were wide and high, higher than in other known amynodonts.

Sellamynodon either entirely lacked a sagittal crest, or had a very low sagittal crest on the posteriormost portion of the skull (which is not preserved in UBB MPS 15795). This is another significant trait, since large sagittal crests was previously considered a diagnostic feature of amynodonts. Because the skull of Sellamynodon also lacked parasagittal ridges, the dorsolateral surface of its braincase was completely smooth, contrary to the braincases of all other known rhinocerotoids. Sagittal crests and parasagittal ridges act as muscle supports on the skull, which thus indicates that the muscles of Sellamynodon connected differently on its skull than in other amynodonts, or that the skull musculature was greatly reduced. The absence of a sagittal ridge in UBB MPS 15795 could have been explained by the specimen being a juvenile, but the dentition of the fossil is worn and indicates a fully grown animal.

The mandible of UBB MPS 15795 is nearly completely preserved, with only the anterior portion of the symphysis missing, and the right third and fourth premolars incomplete. The ramus of the mandible was stout, and unlike other amynodonts inclined forward. There was no lingual groove on the body of the mandible, another feature that is otherwise found in all other known amynodonts.

=== Dentition ===
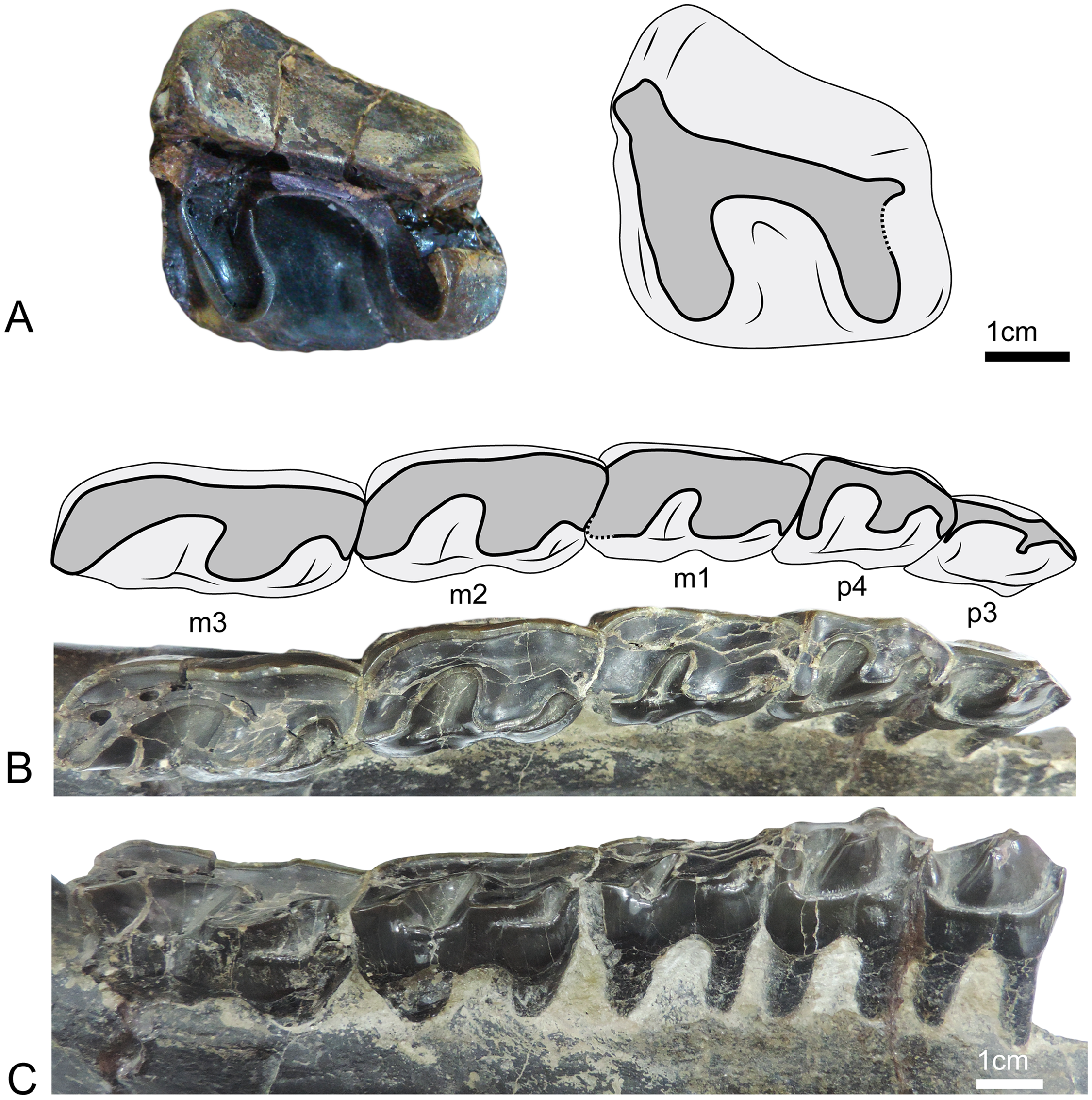
Mandibular dentition of UBB MPS 15795

Given that much of the front parts of the skull are missing in UBB MPS 15795, the only tooth from the upper dentition preserved is the left third molar. The specimen also preserves parts of the roots of the right third upper molar. The third upper molar had a quadratic outline, as is diagnostic for amynodonts.

The lower dental formula of Sellamynodon was classical for amynodonts, with three pairs of lower molars, and the lower premolars reduced in number to just the third and fourth pairs. The anterior teeth (incisors and canines) are not preserved in UBB MPS 15795; there are some small remnants of the roots of these teeth, but it is not possible to distinguish whether they belong to incisors or canines. There was a long diastema (gap between teeth) between the anterior teeth and the premolars.

== Classification ==
In a phylogenetic analysis, Tissier et al. (2018) recovered Sellamynodon in the amynodont tribe Metamynodontini (the "metamynodonts"). Tissier et al. recovered Sellamynodon as the sister taxon of the North American genus Metamynodon, with which it shares a single unambiguous synapomorphy: a closed external auditory pseudomeatus (an ear bone structure). A later phylogenetic analysis by Veine-Tonizzo et al. (2023) recovered Sellamynodon in the same position. The cladogram below presents the results of Veine-Tonizzo et al. (2023):

- Amynodontidae
  - Rostriamynodon grangeri
  - - Amynodon advenus
    - - Sharamynodon mongoliensis
      - - Metamynodontini
          - - Paramynodon birmanicus
            - Megalamynodon regalis
          - - Sellamynodon zimborensis
            - Metamynodon planifrons
        - Cadurcodontini
          - - Zaisanamynodon protheroi
            - Zaisanamynodon borisovi
          - - - - Amynodontopsis bodei
                - Amynodontopsis jiyuanensis
              - - Cadurcotherium cayluxi
                - Cadurcotherium minus
            - - Cadurcodon bahoensis
              - - Cadurcodon maomingensis
                - - Cadurcodon ardynensis
                  - Cadurcodon kazakademius

== Paleoecology ==
No other fossils are recorded from the rock layers at Dobârca in which UBB MPS 15795 is assumed to have been found. Although the precise age of UBB MPS 15795 is undetermined, the fossil has important palaeobiogeographical implications, particularly in the context of European mammal faunas around the time of the Grande Coupure extinction event, at the transition from the Eocene to the Oligocene. If Sellamynodon lived during the Early Oligocene, it would be the only known amynodont genus in Europe at that time other than the more well-known Cadurcotherium. If Sellamynodon is Late Eocene in age, it would also indicate that amynodonts were more diverse in Eastern Europe at that time than previously thought. Sellamynodon also represents the westernmost known occurrence of metamynodont amynodonts, which are otherwise known from North America (Megalamynodon, Metamynodon) and Southeast Asia (Paramynodon).
