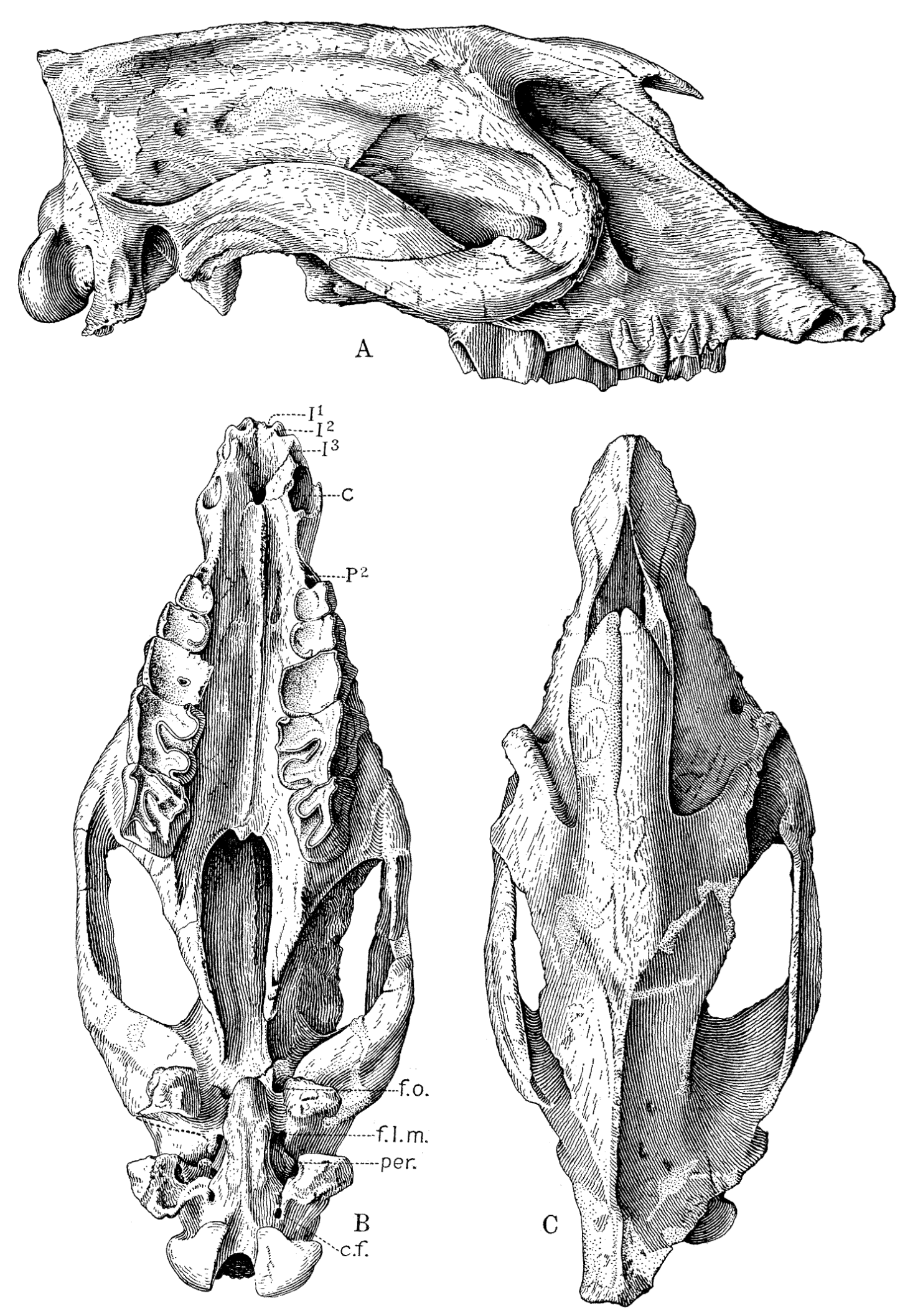
- Type skull of A. bodei (CIT 1087)

Scientific classification
- Kingdom: Animalia
- Phylum: Chordata
- Class: Mammalia
- Infraclass: Placentalia
- Order: Perissodactyla
- Superfamily: Rhinocerotoidea
- Family: †Amynodontidae
- Tribe: †Cadurcodontini
- Genus: †Amynodontopsis; Stock, 1933

Type species
- †Amynodontopsis bodei Stock, 1933

Other species
- †A. jiyuanensis Wang et al., 2020; †A. parvidens Wall, 1981; †A. tholos Wall, 1981

= Amynodontopsis =

Amynodontopsis Temporal range: Middle–Late Eocene, (Note: North American fossils of Amynodontopsis range in age from the late Uintan to the end of the Duchesnean land mammal age. Asian fossils are from the Sharamurunian (A. jiyuanensis) and Ulangochuian (A. parvidens and A. tholos) land mammal ages.) 42.8–37 Ma

Extinct genus of mammals

Amynodontopsis is an extinct genus of amynodont that lived in Asia and North America during the Middle to Late Eocene. Several species of Amynodontopsis are recognized. The type species, A. bodei, is known from the United States and Mexico. Three species are known from China; A. jiyuanensis, A. parvidens, and A. tholos. Fossils from Eastern Europe have also been referred to Amynodontopsis, but the assignment of these fossils to the genus has since been disputed.

Amynodontopsis was probably a lightly built animal. A. bodei has been estimated to have weighed 751 kilograms (1,656 lb). A. tholos was slightly larger, though its precise size has not been estimated. Amynodontopsis may have had a tapir-like proboscis in life, though not as developed as in the related Cadurcodon.

== Research history ==
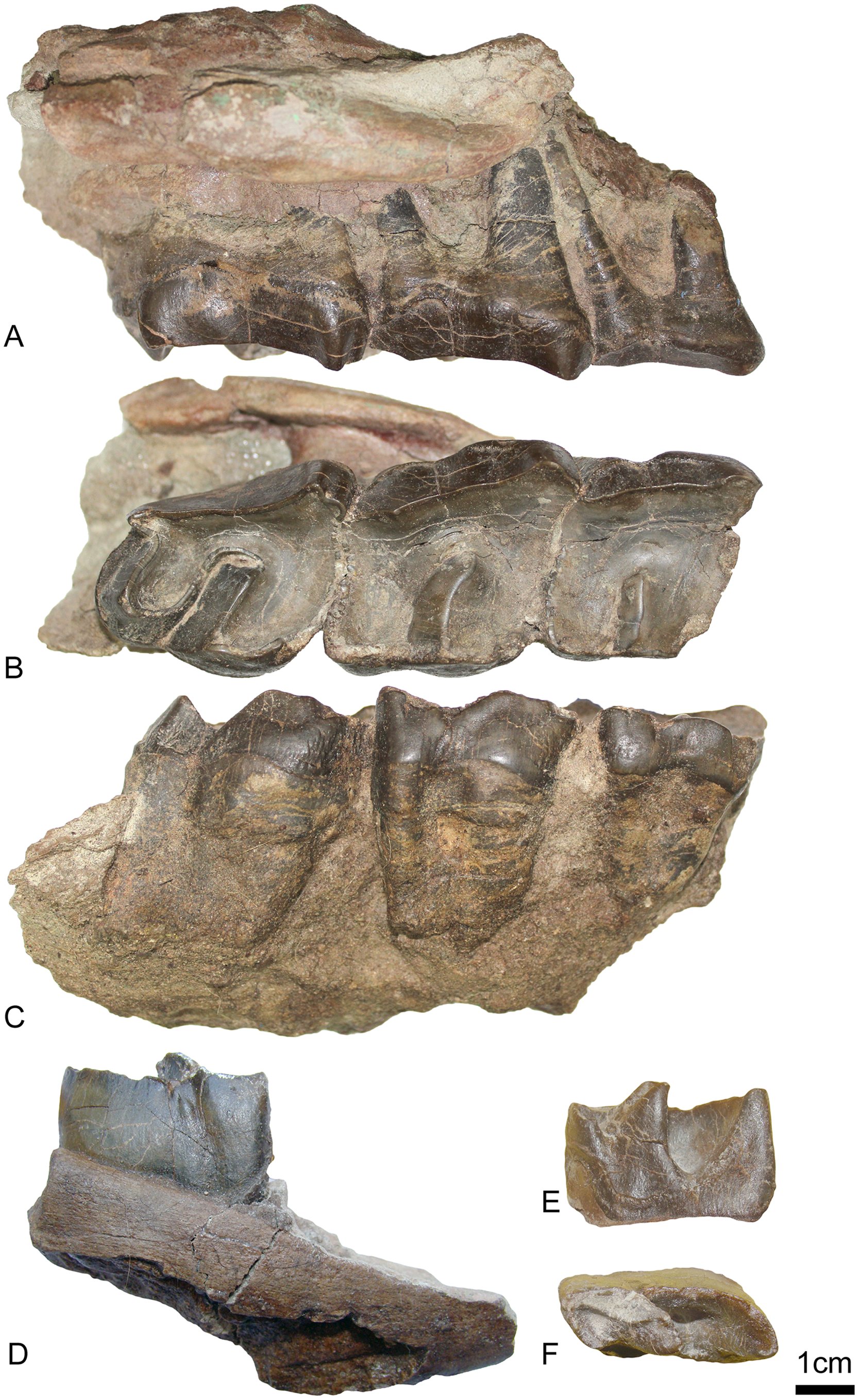
Skull fragments from Romania referred to Amynodontopsis aff. bodei in 2018. The assignment of European fossils to Amynodontopsis has since been questioned.

=== North America ===
Amynodontopsis bodei was described by Chester Stock in 1933, based on a well-preserved skull (CIT 1087) found in the Sespe Formation in California. Stock compared Amynodontopsis to the North American amynodonts known at the time, Amynodon and Metamynodon, and assessed the animal as more advanced than Amynodon, but not as derived as Metamynodon. The species name bodei is in honor of Francis D. Bode, who helped Stock in his exploration of the Sespe Formation.

Stock compared Amynodontopsis bodei mainly to different species of Amynodon, noting that Amynodontopsis was larger than Amynodon advenus and Amynodon erectus. Stock found Amynodontopsis to be similar in size to the largest Amynodon species, Amynodon intermedius, but less robust, and suggested that Amynodon intermedius might actually belong to Amynodontopsis. Amynodon erectus and Amynodon intermedius have since been identified as synonyms of Amynodon advenus. The proposed similarities between Amynodon intermedius and Amynodontopsis bodei were rejected by William P. Wall in 1982 as based on erroneous interpretations of the Amynodon fossils.

In 1967, fossils of A. bodei were reported from South Dakota, extending its known range. Fossils of A. bodei from the late Eocene of Texas were reported in 1981. In 2015, a mandibular fragment of Amynodontopsis cf. bodei was reported from southern Mexico.

=== Asia and Europe ===
In 1981, William P. Wall described several fossils collected in the Erlian Basin of Inner Mongolia, China by the Central Asiatic Expeditions of the American Museum of Natural History. Wall described two new species based on the material, A. parvidens and A. tholos, both from the Ulangochuian land mammal age. A. parvidens and A. tholos share several dental and skull features with A. bodei, but are also different in some features, such as reduced zygomatic arches, and anteriorly squared off nasal bones. In 1989, Wall noted that the two Asian species could alternatively be reassigned to a new sister genus to Amynodontopsis.

Tissier et al. (2018) assigned fragments of maxillae and lower jaws from Eastern Europe to Amynodontopsis aff. bodei. These fragmentary fossils originate from the Valea Nadăşului Formation in Romania (Late Eocene) and the Dorog Coal Formation in Hungary (Middle Eocene). The assignment of the European fossils to Amynodontopsis was questioned by Wang et al. (2020), who opinioned that most of the features used to assign them to Amynodontopsis were not derived characters, and that the fossils showed some differences to Amynodontopsis, notably narrower cheek teeth with more developed external grooves.

In 2020, Wang et al. described the new species Amynodontopsis jiyuanensis, based on a relatively well-preserved skull (IVPP V 26305) from the Sharamurunian (Middle Eocene) Niezhuang Formation in the Jiyuan Basin, Henan, China. A. jiyuanensis is relatively early in age and had some primitive characteristics when compared to the other three species. Wang et al. thus interpreted it as an ancestral form to the other species of Amynodontopsis.

== Description ==
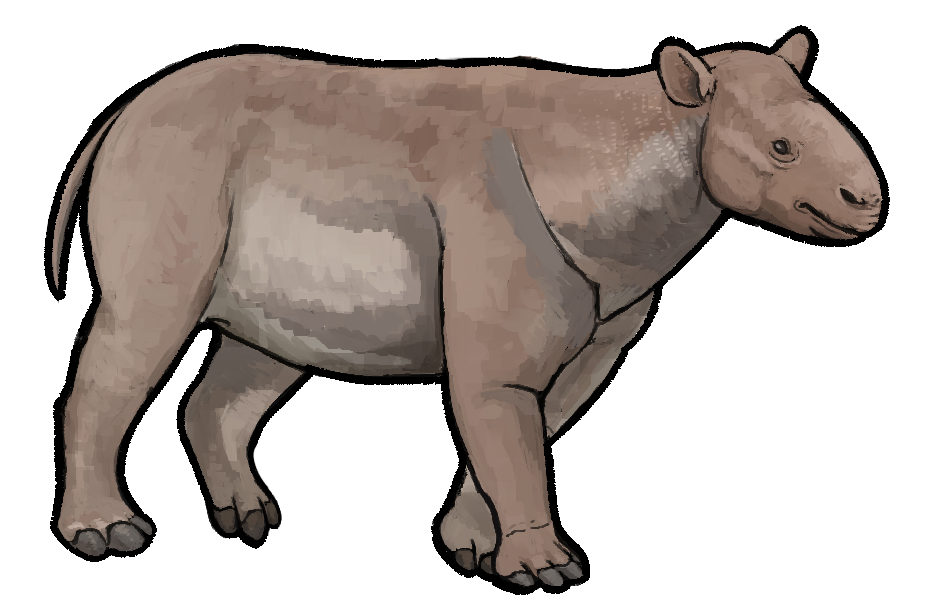
Life restoration of A. jiyuanensis

Amynodontopsis had a dolichocephalic (relatively elongated) skull. It had the dental formula 3.1.3.33.1.2-3.3. Amynodontopsis belonged to the derived amynodont tribe Cadurcodontini, whose members are interpreted as lightly built and terrestrial animals.

The weight of A. bodei has been estimated at 633 kilograms (1,396 lb) to 751 kilograms (1,656 lb). A. tholos was the largest species of Amynodontopsis; the base of the skull of A. bodei is 482 millimetres (19.0 in) long, whereas that of A. tholos is 524 millimetres (20.6 in). A. parvidens and A. jiyuanensis were smaller.

The nasal incision of Amynodontopsis extends further back in the skull than in more basal amynodonts. The extended nasal incision, and a backwards migration of the canines relative to more basal amynodonts resulted in an overall shortening of the preorbital (facial) region of the skull. The nasal bones, above the nasal incision, are also squared off and reduced, especially in A. tholos and A. parvidens, while the nasal incision is greatest in A. bodei. These adaptations, and the skull having an overall tapir-like appearance, indicate that Amynodontopsis may have had a tapir-like proboscis in life. Similar adaptations are seen to an even greater extent in the related amynodont Cadurcodon.

== Classification ==
Amynodontopsis is classified as a cadurcodontine amynodont. Phylogenetic analyses recover Amynodontopsis as the sister taxon of Cadurcotherium. The cladogram below presents the results of a phylogenetic analysis by Veine-Tonizzo et al. (2023):

- Amynodontidae
  - Rostriamynodon grangeri
  - - Amynodon advenus
    - - Sharamynodon mongoliensis
      - - Metamynodontini
          - - Paramynodon birmanicus
            - Megalamynodon regalis
          - - Sellamynodon zimborensis
            - - Metamynodon planifrons
              - UNISTRA.2015.0.1106
        - Cadurcodontini
          - - Zaisanamynodon protheroi
            - - Zaisanamynodon borisovi
              - ZSN-KKS-28-IPB
          - - - - Amynodontopsis bodei
                - Amynodontopsis jiyuanensis
              - - Cadurcotherium cayluxi
                - Cadurcotherium minus
            - - Cadurcodon bahoensis
              - - Cadurcodon maomingensis
                - - Cadurcodon ardynensis
                  - Cadurcodon kazakademius
