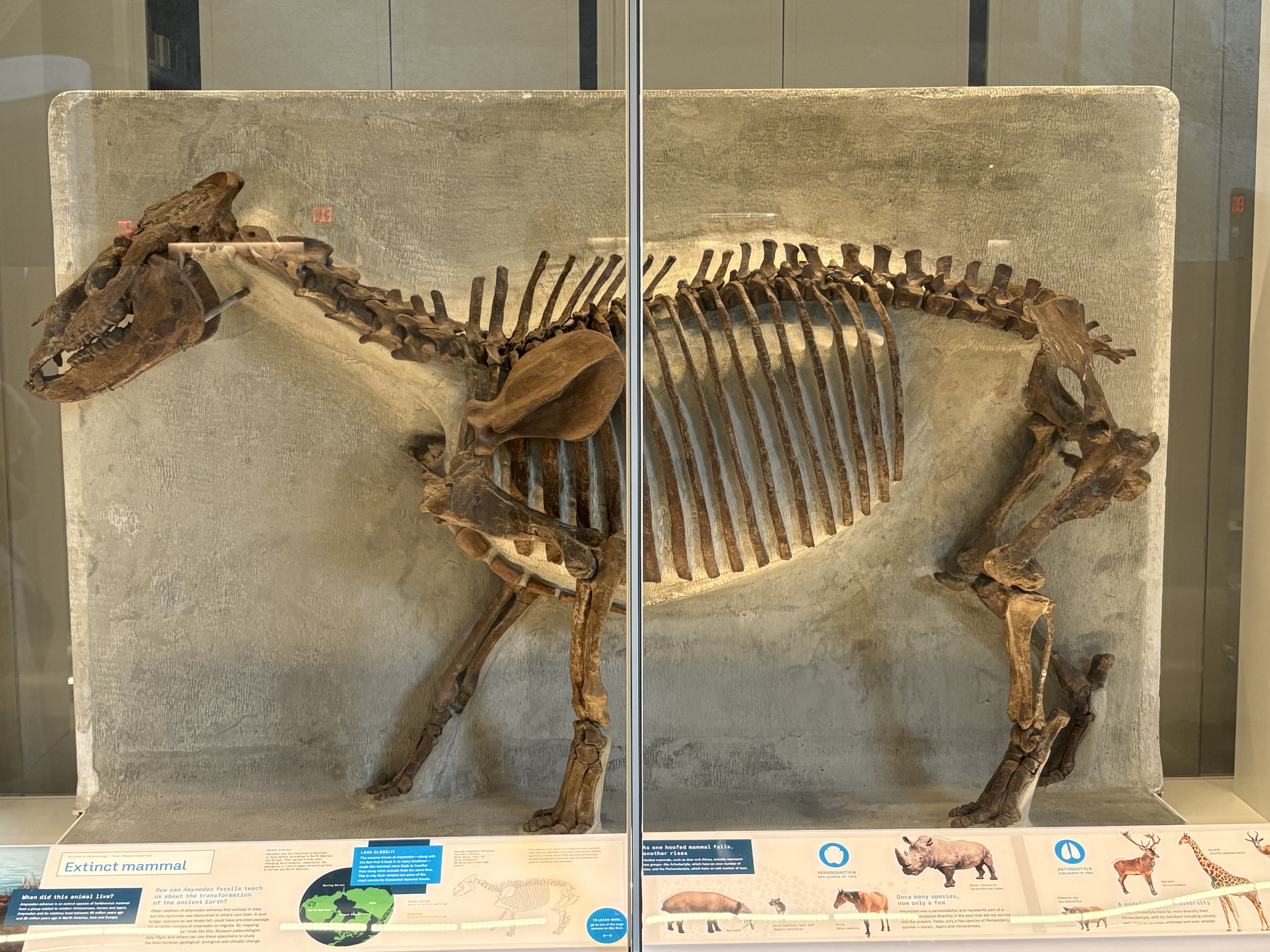
- Mounted skeleton of Amynodon
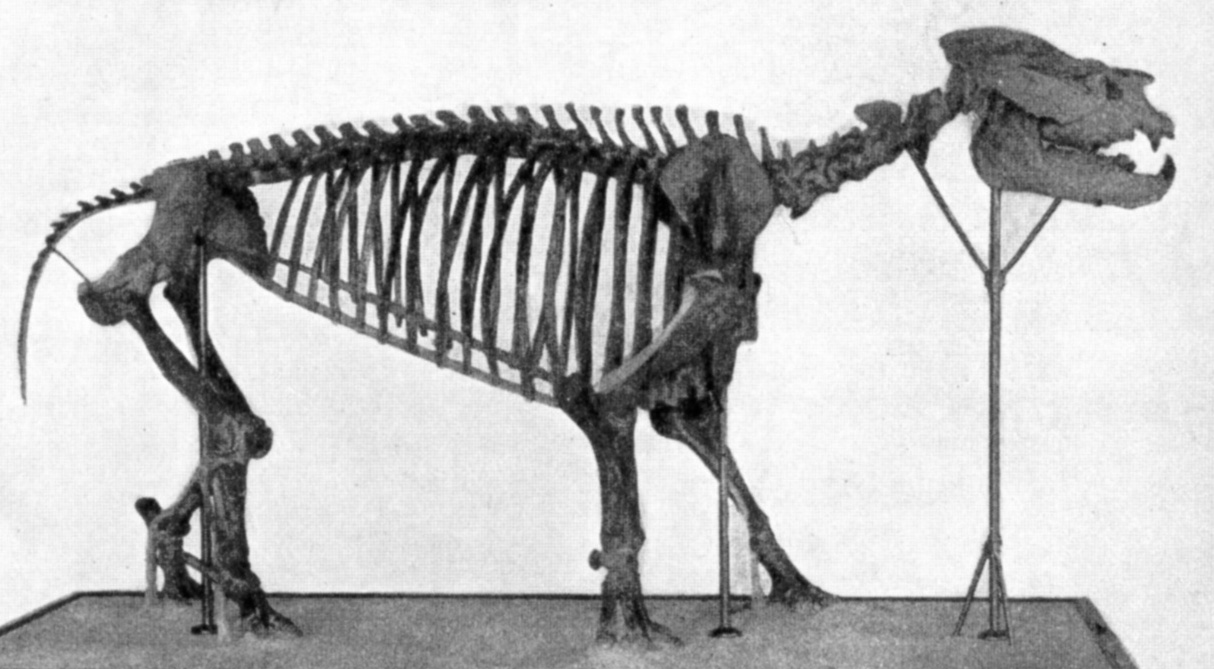
- Mounted skeleton of Metamynodon

Scientific classification
- Kingdom: Animalia
- Phylum: Chordata
- Class: Mammalia
- Order: Perissodactyla
- Superfamily: Rhinocerotoidea
- Family: †Amynodontidae; Scott & Osborn, 1883

Genera and subgroups
- †Amynodon
- †Caenolophus
- †Gigantamynodon?
- †Huananodon
- †Hypsamynodon?
- †Lushiamynodon?
- †Rostriamynodon
- †Sharamynodon
- †Teilhardia
- †Cadurcodontini Wall, 1982
  - †Amynodontopsis
  - †Cadurcodon
  - †Cadurcotherium
  - †Paracadurcodon?
  - †Sianodon?
  - †Zaisanamynodon
- †Metamynodontini Kretzoi, 1942
  - †Megalamynodon
  - †Metamynodon
  - †Paramynodon
  - †Sellamynodon
Possible amynodonts
- †Armania
- †Toxotherium

= Amynodontidae =

Amynodonts Temporal range: Middle Eocene–Late Oligocene, 47.8–23 Ma Possible Early Eocene and Early Miocene records

Extinct family of mammals

Amynodonts (lit. 'threatening teeth'), also called swamp rhinoceroses, are an extinct group of rhinocerotoids belonging to the family Amynodontidae. Fossils of amynodonts are known from the Eocene to Oligocene of North America, Europe, and Asia. At their height, the amynodonts were among the dominant groups of herbivorous mammals in the Northern Hemisphere.

Amynodonts had a somewhat hippopotamus-like build, with massive bodies, short and robust limbs, and large and tusk-like canine teeth, from which the group derives its name. Because of their hippopotamus-like proportions, amynodonts are traditionally interpreted as semiaquatic animals, though whether this applies to all amynodonts is disputed. Derived amynodonts are classified in two tribes: the robust Metamynodontini (or "metamynodonts") and the more lightly built and tapir-like Cadurcodontini (or "cadurcodonts"). Amynodonts increased in body size over the course of their evolutionary history. Primitive amynodonts such as Caenolophus were small animals, weighing just over a hundred kilograms. The largest amynodont, Zaisanamynodon, could reach a body mass of close to three tonnes.

Amynodont fossils, belonging to the genus Cadurcotherium, were first discovered in France in the late 19th century. Important early studies of their fossils were soon thereafter conducted on North American genera such as Amynodon and Metamynodon. In the early 20th century, amynodont fossils were first discovered in Asia, where the group appears to have been the most diverse. The taxonomy and systematics of Asian amynodonts is unclear, and much of the fossil material is in need of re-examination.

== Research history ==
Partial maxilla of Cadurcotherium, found in France

Amynodonts were first brought to scientific attention in 1873, when Paul Gervais described Cadurcotherium cayluxi. Gervais based his new taxon on a collection of isolated molars from the Oligocene Quercy Phosphorites Formation in Occitania, southern France. Significantly more complete fossil material of Cadurcotherium has since been discovered, but the scant original fossils initially made classification of Cadurcotherium difficult, though Gervais noted similarities to rhinoceros teeth. Two years after the description of Cadurcotherium, Othniel Charles Marsh described the first fossils now recognized as amynodonts from North America. These initial fossils consisted of isolated teeth from the Eocene of the Uinta Basin of Utah, which Marsh initially referred to the rhinoceros genus Diceratherium. In 1877, Marsh described the first well-preserved amynodont skull, found in the Uinta Basin. Marsh referred the skull, and his previous teeth, to the new genus Amynodon. Marsh believed Amynodon to represent the earliest rhinoceros discovered, and a form more or less intermediate between rhinoceroses and tapirs, but with molars like those of a rhinoceros.

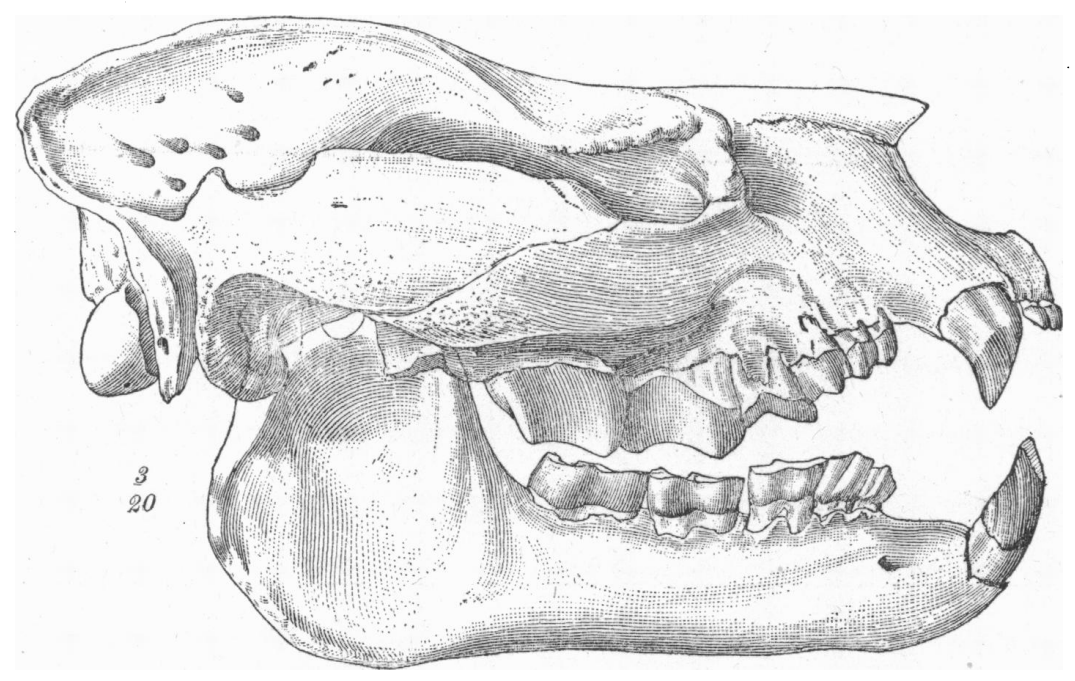
Illustration of the skull of Metamynodon

In 1883, William Berryman Scott and Henry Fairfield Osborn erected the new family Amynodontidae, initially to contain Amynodon and the genus Orthocynodon (since identified as a synonym of Amynodon), in order to distinguish them from both rhinoceroses and hyracodonts. Despite the creation of a new family, amynodonts were still believed to be animals on the path towards modern rhinoceroses. The description of Metamynodon in 1887 challenged the idea that Amynodon was a predecessor of rhinoceroses. Osborn recognized that Metamynodon was undoubtedly a derived "successor" of Amynodon, and yet "certainly far from the rhinoceros line", and amynodonts were thus for the first time recognized as a parallel lineage, not ancestral to any modern forms. Based on Metamynodon, Scott and Osborn were able to establish several important family-level characteristics of the amynodonts, including an enlarged sagittal crest and the loss of the first pair of premolars. In the 1890s, discoveries were made of relatively complete skeletons of both Amynodon and Metamynodon.

The relationship between the North American amynodonts and the European Cadurcotherium was not immediately recognized. Karl Alfred von Zittel was the first to classify Cadurcotherium as an amynodont, in his Handbuch der Palaeontologie (1876–1893). Frédéric Roman and Léonce Joleaud, who published the first major work on Cadurcotherium in 1909, agreed with Zittel's assessment. Several scholars disagreed; in 1896, Marcellin Boule inexplicably linked Cadurcotherium to the South American Astrapotherium, and in 1921, Edward Leffingwell Troxell claimed that Cadurcotherium was "wholly inharmonious" with the amynodonts. Osborn recognized Cadurcotherium as an amynodont in 1898 and 1923, and better preserved fossils have since more reliably placed Cadurcotherium in the family.

Amynodont fossils were first discovered in Asia in the 1910s and 1920s, in Eocene deposits in Myanmar. These fossils, from the Pondaung Formation, were referred to Metamynodon by Guy Ellcock Pilgrim and George de P. Cotter in 1916 but were later reassessed and moved to the distinct genus Paramynodon. In the 1920s and 1930s, amynodont fossils were discovered in Mongolia and China; this included the discovery of relatively complete fossils of Sharamynodon in 1925.

The first attempt to determine the interrelationships of various amynodont taxa and divide the family into subgroups was made by Miklós Kretzoi in 1942. Important systematic work on the amynodonts was later conducted in the 1980s by William P. Wall, who was the first to perform phylogenetic analyses of the group. A large number of amynodont taxa were described in the 20th century based on fossils from Asia, placed in genera such as Amynodon, Lushiamynodon, and Sianodon. Although amynodonts appear to have been most diverse in Asia, detailed re-examination of their Asian fossil record is still necessary in order to determine the taxonomy and true number of taxa.

== Description ==
=== Skull and dentition ===
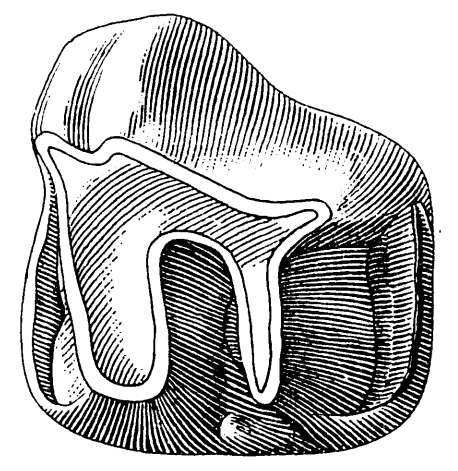
Third upper molar of Amynodon, showing its vaguely quadratic outline

Skulls and inferred soft tissue snouts of three amynodonts, from top to bottom: Rostriamynodon, Metamynodon, and Cadurcodon

Several synapomorphies (shared unique traits) distinguish amynodonts from other rhinocerotoids. Dentally, the third pair of upper molars of amynodonts had a vaguely quadratic outline due to unique developments of the cusps and ridges. The quadratic shape of this tooth is unique to amynodonts, and separates the family from all other known rhinocerotoids. Another significant synapomorphy is the presence of preorbital fossae (grooves in front of the orbits) of the amynodont skull. The fossae differed in size and position depending on lineage; in primitive amynodonts (such as Amynodon), there were large fossae in front of the orbits. In the more derived amynodont groups, the condition of the fossae became a distinguishing trait; metamynodonts had reduced fossae whereas cadurcodonts had fossae that extend medial to the orbit (i.e. towards the middle of the orbits).

Overall skull morphology was variable in amynodonts. There was an evolutionary trend of shortening snouts; the preorbital (in front of the eyes) portion of the skull of the primitive Rostriamynodon accounts for about 42% of the skull, compared to sometimes just about 35% in the slightly more derived Amynodon, and even less in more derived amynodonts. Basal amynodonts had relatively dolichocephalic (long relative to their width) skulls. In cadurcodonts, the skull was even more dolichocephalic, whereas the skulls of metamynodonts had enlarged zygomatic arches and were thus brachycephalic (wide relative to their length). In Cadurcodon and some related derived cadurcodonts, the nasal bones were greatly reduced, and the nasal incision was greatly expanded. These features, combined with the presence of muscle scars on the snout of Cadurcodon, behind the external nares, indicate that Cadurcodon and some of its close relatives had well-developed proboscises similar to those of modern tapirs.

Most amynodonts had relatively flat skulls, and in some taxa the skull was even slightly convex. It was previously believed that the skulls of all amynodonts had sagittal crests, a feature shared with some more primitive perissodactyls, such as Hyrachyus. Sellamynodon, described in 2018, showed that these features did not apply to the entire group, since Sellamynodon had a saddle-shaped skull without a noticeable sagittal crest.

In addition to the vaguely quadratic third upper molars, other evolutionary trends observed in amynodont dentition include enlarged canines, a decreasing importance of the premolars, and increasing emphasis in the molars on shearing by the ectolophs and a corresponding simplification of the crosslophs (two prominent ridges on the surface of the molar). The enlarged and tusk-like canines of amynodonts was another relatively unique trait among rhinocerotoids. Most other known rhinocerotoids either have small canines, or lack them entirely. When other rhinocerotoid groups have developed tusks, they have typically developed from the incisor teeth. The name of the genus Amynodon means "threatening tooth", in reference to the tusk-like canines.

=== Postcranium ===
Skeletal reconstruction of Sharamynodon

Amynodonts were stocky and large-bodied animals. Postcranial fossils are known only from some amynodont taxa, and it is thus difficult to draw detailed conclusions about the postcrania of amynodonts as a group. Primitive amynodonts may have been subcursorial. It appears that the postcrania of cadurcodonts did not diverge much from their ancestral condition, though postcranial fossils are rare from advanced cadurcodonts. The bodies of advanced metamynodonts had diverged from those of their ancestors, and had become barrel-chested, with heavier and shorter limbs.

Amynodonts had four toes on their manus (front feet) and three on their pes (hind feet), the primitive perissodactyl condition.

== Taxonomy ==
=== External systematics and relations ===
Amynodonts have been recognized as relatives of modern rhinoceroses since their fossils were first discovered. The placement of amynodonts in Rhinocerotoidea has sometimes been questioned in the past; in 1969, Leonard Radinsky for instance argued that amynodonts were not rhinocerotoids, but that they had evolved from tapiroid ancestors. Modern phylogenetic analyses consistently recover Amynodontidae as a monophyletic group inside Rhinocerotoidea. An important dental trait that places amynodonts as rhinocerotoids is their π-shaped upper molars, which they share with the rest of Rhinocerotoidea.

Recent phylogenies do not agree on the overall relationships within Rhinocerotoidea, and amynodonts have been recovered in various positions. The cladograms below show the results of five recent phylogenetic analyses, simplified to only show the relations between family-level rhinocerotoid taxa:

Topology A: Wang et al. (2016)

- Rhinocerotoidea
  - †Hyracodontidae
  - - - †Amynodontidae
      - †Paraceratheriidae (incl. Forstercooperiinae
    - - †Eggysodontidae
      - Rhinocerotidae

Topology B: Bai et al. (2020)

- Rhinocerotoidea
  - †Hyracodontidae
  - - †Forstercooperiidae
    - - †Amynodontidae
      - - †Eggysodontidae
        - - †Paraceratheriidae
          - Rhinocerotidae

Topology C: Deng et al. (2021)

- Rhinocerotoidea
  - †Amynodontidae
  - - †Hyracodontidae
    - - Rhinocerotidae
      - - †Forstercooperiidae
        - †Paraceratheriidae

Topology D: Veine-Tonizzo et al. (2023)

- Rhinocerotoidea
  - Rhinocerotidae
  - - †Eggysodontidae
    - - †Amynodontidae
      - - †Hyracodontidae
        - †Paraceratheriidae

Topology E: Lu et al. (2026)

- Rhinocerotoidea
  - †Amynodontidae
  - - - †Forstercooperiidae
      - †Paraceratheriidae
    - - †Hyracodontidae (incl. Eggysodontinae)
      - Rhinocerotidae

=== Internal systematics ===
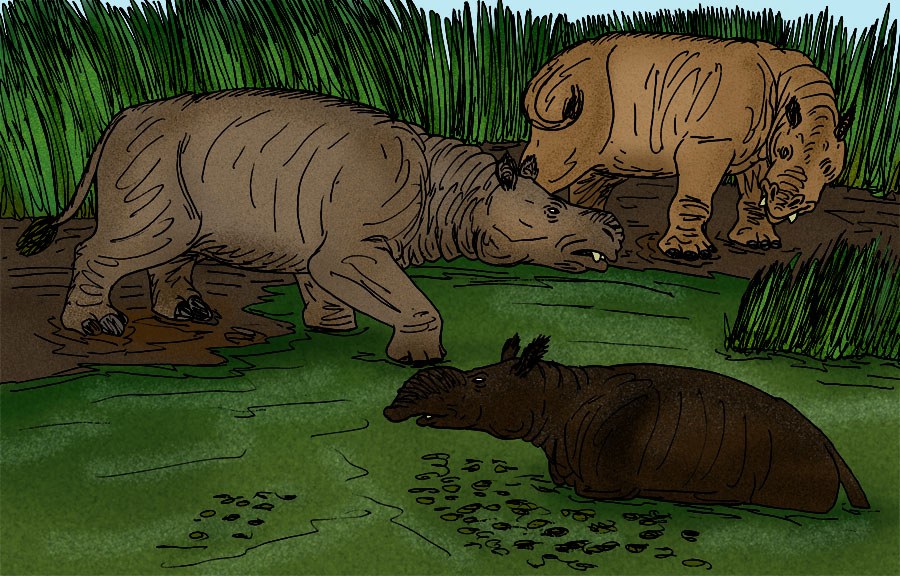
Life reconstructions of the amynodonts Metamynodon (upper right), Gigantamynodon (left), and Cadurcodon (lower right)

The first attempt at a systematic revision and overview of amynodonts was published by Miklós Kretzoi in 1942. Kretzoi revised and named several amynodont genera, and divided the family into four subfamilies: Amynodontinae, Cadurcotheriinae, Metamynodontinae, and Paramynodontinae, mainly distinguished by skull and dental features. Kretzoi's classification scheme was rejected by Vera Gromova in 1954, who did not recognize any subgroups inside Amynodontidae.

In the 1980s, William P. Wall attempted to refine the internal classification of the amynodonts, and was the first to perform a phylogenetic analysis of the group. Wall divided amynodonts into two subfamilies: Rostriamynodontinae (containing only the primitive Rostriamynodon), and Amynodontinae (all other amynodonts), which in turn was subdivided into the tribes Amynodontini, Cadurcodontini, and Metamynodontini based mostly on the morphology and extent of the preorbital fossae.

Amynodont systematics by various authors (20th century)
Kretzoi (1942)	Prothero, Manning & Hanson (1986)	Wall (1989)	McKenna & Bell (1997)
Family Amynodontidae: Subfamily Amynodontinae; Amynodon; Amynodontopsis; Orthocynodon; Sharamynodon; Subfamily Cadurcotheriinae; Cadurcamynodon; Cadurcodon; Cadurcopsis; Cadurcotherium; Subfamily Metamynodontinae; Metamynodon; Subfamily Paramynodontinae; Paramynodon	Family Amynodontidae: Amynodon; Caenolophus; Subfamily Cadurcodontinae; Amynodontopsis; Cadurcodon; Sharamynodon; Sianodon; Subfamily Paramynodontinae; Cadurcotherium; Megalamynodon; Metamynodon; Paramynodon; Zaisanamynodon	Family Amynodontidae: Subfamily Rostriamynodontinae; Rostriamynodon; Subfamily Amynodontinae; Tribe Amynodontini; Amynodon (=Orthocynodon); Tribe Cadurcodontini; Amynodontopsis; Cadurcodon; Sharamynodon (=Lushiamynodon?); Sianodon; Tribe Metamynodontini; Cadurcotherium (=Cadurcamynodon); Megalamynodon; Metamynodon (=Cadurcopsis); Paramynodon; Zaisanamynodon; Incertae sedis: Caenolophus; Euryodon; Huananodon; Hypsamynodon; Paracadurcodon; Procadurcodon; Teilhardia; Toxotherium	Subfamily Amynodontinae (in Rhinocerotidae): Caenolophus; Gigantamynodon; Hypsamynodon; Rostriamynodon; Teilhardia; Tribe Amynodontini; Amynodon (=Orthocynodon); Amynodontopsis; Armania; Euryodon; Lushiamynodon; Mesamynodon (Note: Mesamynodon has since been identified as a hyracodont, and is typically treated as a synonym of Hyracodon.); Penetrigonias (Note: Penetrigonias is otherwise universally recognized as a rhinocerotid, not an amynodont.); Sharamynodon; Toxotherium; Tribe Cadurcotheriini; Subtribe Cadurcotheriina; Cadurcamynodon; Cadurcodon; Cadurcopsis; Cadurcotherium; Procadurcodon; Sianodon; Subtribe Metamynodontina; Megalamynodon; Metamynodon; Paramynodon; Zaisanamynodon

21st-century phylogenetic analyses have generally recovered relationships similar to those proposed by Wall. In 2017, Averianov et al. recovered a sequential branching of basal amynodonts, and two supported clades of derived amynodonts, roughly corresponding to Wall's Cadurcodontini and Metamynodontini. Averianov et al. did not retain "Rostriamynodontinae", "Amynodontinae", or "Amynodontini" as used by Wall, but used "Cadurcodontini" and "Metamynodontini" as names for the two derived groups. Basal amynodonts outside of Cadurcodontini and Metamynodontini were referred to merely as "early diverging amynodontids". This has been followed in later analyses by Tissier et al. (2018) and Veine-Tonizzo et al. (2023). Averianov et al. differed from Wall in recovering Cadurcotherium and Zaisanamynodon as cadurcodonts (not metamynodonts), and Amynodontopsis as a relatively basal genus. Tissier et al. and Veine-Tonizzo et al. recovered Amynodontopsis as a more derived genus in Cadurcodontini, but otherwise largely agreed with Averianov et al. The genus Procadurcodon was considered valid by Averianov et al., but was treated as a synonym of Zaisanamynodon by both Tissier et al. and Veine-Tonizzo et al.

Topology A: Averianov et al. (2017)

- Amynodontidae
  - Rostriamynodon grangeri
  - - Amynodon advenus
    - - "Amynodon" sinensis
      - - Amynodontopsis bodei
        - - Sharamynodon mongoliensis
          - - Metamynodontini
              - Megalamynodon regalis
              - Metamynodon planifrons
              - Paramynodon birmanicus
            - Cadurcodontini
              - Procadurcodon orientalis
              - Zaisanamynodon borisovi
              - - - Cadurcotherium cayluxi
                  - Cadurcotherium minus
                - - Cadurcodon maomingensis
                  - - Cadurcodon bahoensis
                    - - Cadurcodon ardynensis
                      - Cadurcodon kazakademius

Topology B: Tissier et al. (2018)

- Amynodontidae
  - Rostriamynodon grangeri
  - - Amynodon advenus
    - - Sharamynodon mongoliensis
      - - Metamynodontini
          - Paramynodon birmanicus
          - - Megalamynodon regalis
            - - Sellamynodon zimborensis
              - Metamynodon planifrons
        - Cadurcodontini
          - - "Amynodon" reedi
            - - Zaisanamynodon borisovi
              - Zaisanamynodon protheroi
          - - Sianodon gaowangouensis
            - - - - Amynodontopsis bodei
                  - Amynodontopsis aff. bodei
                - - Cadurcotherium minus
                  - Cadurcotherium cayluxi
              - - Cadurcodon bahoensis
                - - Cadurcodon maomingensis
                  - - Cadurcodon ardynensis
                    - Cadurcodon kazakademius

Topology C: Veine-Tonizzo et al. (2023)

- Amynodontidae
  - Rostriamynodon grangeri
  - - Amynodon advenus
    - - Sharamynodon mongoliensis
      - - Metamynodontini
          - - Paramynodon birmanicus
            - Megalamynodon regalis
          - - Sellamynodon zimborensis
            - Metamynodon planifrons
        - Cadurcodontini
          - - Zaisanamynodon protheroi
            - Zaisanamynodon borisovi
          - - - - Amynodontopsis bodei
                - Amynodontopsis jiyuanensis
              - - Cadurcotherium cayluxi
                - Cadurcotherium minus
            - - Cadurcodon bahoensis
              - - Cadurcodon maomingensis
                - - Cadurcodon ardynensis
                  - Cadurcodon kazakademius

== Evolutionary history ==
=== Origins and dispersal ===
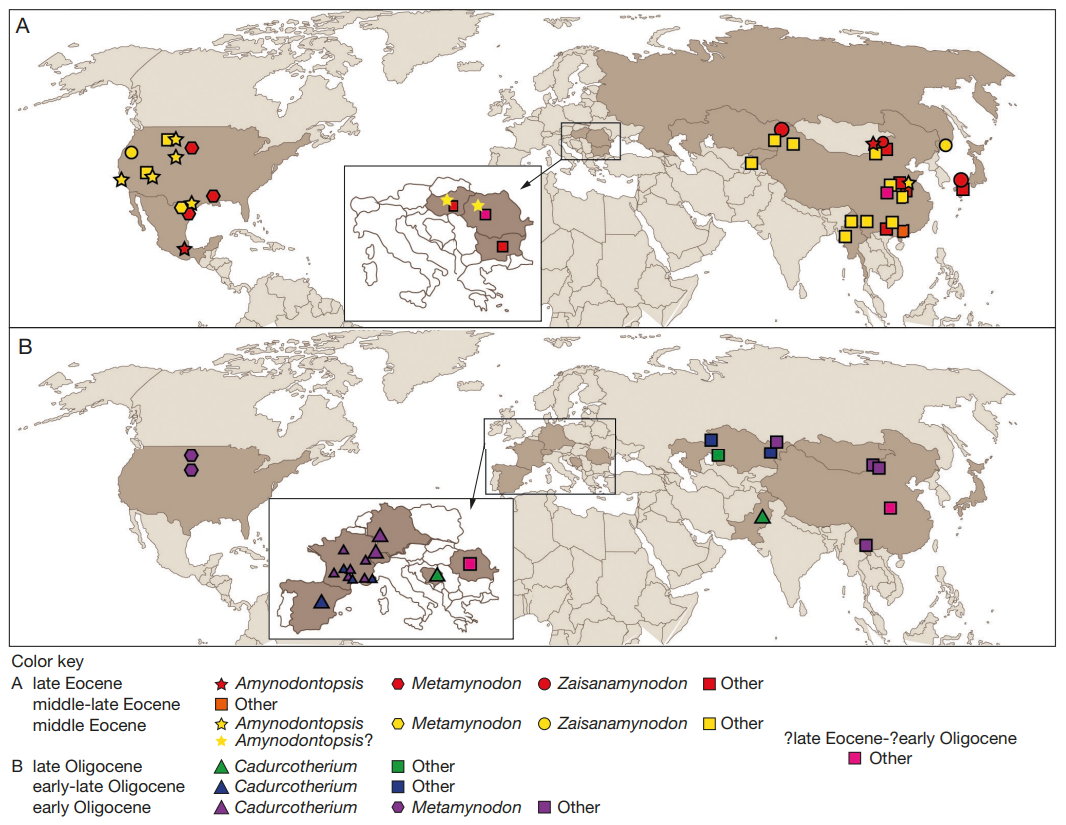
Map of amynodont fossil finds from the Middle–Late Eocene (top) and Oligocene (bottom)

Amynodonts probably originated in Asia during the Early Eocene. The oldest well-defined amynodont is Rostriamynodon, known from Middle Eocene deposits of the Irdin Manha Formation in China. Caenolophus, contemporary with Rostriamynodon, may be an even more primitive amynodont, with features intermediate between amynodonts and more primitive rhinocerotoids, but it is known from more fragmentary fossils. Teilhardia, known from the same area, is also considered a very primitive amynodont, possibly even more primitive than (and ancestral to) Caenolophus. Lushiamynodon kirghisensis, known from fragmentary fossils from Kyrgyzstan, has been argued to be the earliest amynodont, perhaps Ypresian in age, but this date is controversial.

Amynodonts spread to North America shortly after their initial appearance and soon achieved a Holarctic distribution. They became one of the dominant herbivore groups of their time. In North America, the temporal range of the amynodonts extends from the Middle Eocene to the Early Oligocene. The earliest known North American amynodont is Amynodon, from the late Bridgerian and Uintan land mammal ages. Amynodonts reached their greatest taxonomic diversity in Asia.

Migration across Beringia was highly important in amynodont evolution. The ancestors of the North American Amynodon and Amynodontopsis bodei were probably amynodonts that migrated from Asia separately; Amynodontopsis bodei is more derived than Amynodon but likely descended from the Asian species Amynodontopsis jiyuanensis. Phylogenetic analyses suggest that there may have been as many as four or five dispersal events where new amynodonts spread from Asia into North America. There were also several dispersal events into Europe. Cadurcotherium is the only amynodont genus recorded from Western Europe, but both Cadurcodon and Sellamynodon are known from Eastern Europe. Amynodonts do not appear to have reached Northern Europe. Migration of amynodonts into Europe in the Oligocene may have been facilitated by the preceding Grande Coupure extinction event.

=== Diversification and extinction ===
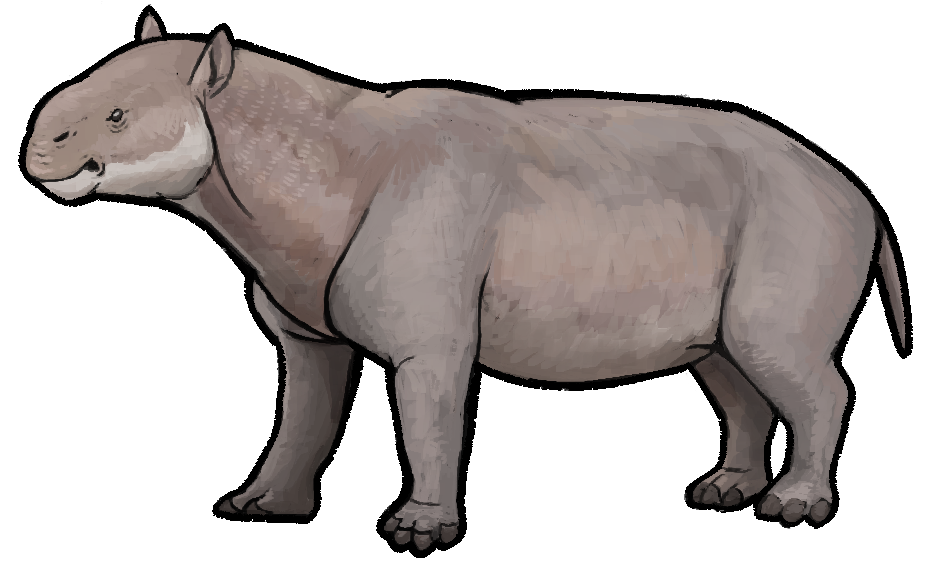
Life restoration of Zaisanamynodon, the largest amynodont

The Middle to Late Eocene was a time of great environmental change, which may have facilitated further evolutionary radiation of the amynodonts. In North America, the environment changed during this time from lush semitropical forests to being dominated by open forests and grasslands. The timeframe corresponding to the late Uintan and the Duchesnean land mammal ages in North America saw the emergence of the cadurcodonts and metamynodonts, illustrating diversification and pursuits of different lifestyles. Similar to North American examples, Asian amynodonts also appear to have diversified around the Eocene–Oligocene boundary. The metamynodonts experienced evolutionary radiation in North America, represented by the genera Megalamynodon and Metamynodon.

Amynodonts increased considerably in body size over the course of their evolutionary history. The primitive Caenolophus has been estimated to have reached a mass of just 156 kilograms (344 lb), and the smallest known amynodont is the relatively basal "Amynodon" sinensis, estimated at 127 kilograms (280 lb). The largest known amynodont, the Late Eocene Zaisanamynodon, is estimated to have reached a mass of 2,720 kilograms (6,000 lb). Following the extinction of the brontotheres at the Eocene–Oligocene boundary, Metamynodon was the largest mammal in North America, though it was smaller than the earlier Zaisanamynodon.

In the Oligocene, Amynodonts continued to be more successful in Asia than in North America, perhaps due to the increasing aridity in North America. Metamynodonts survived in North America into the Oligocene; Metamynodon lived in river systems across most of the continent, but was a rare element of the Oligocene fauna and was extinct by the end of the Whitneyan land mammal age (late Early Oligocene). Amynodonts in Europe disappeared in the latest Oligocene. Amynodonts survived the longest in Asia, and it is unclear when exactly they went extinct. Cadurcotherium indicum, from modern-day Pakistan, was previously dated to the Early Miocene, but this date has since proven incorrect and the fossils are now considered latest Oligocene. Gigantamynodon akespensis, from Kazakhstan, is either latest Oligocene or earliest Miocene in age, but it is unclear if this species actually represents an amynodont.

== Paleobiology ==
=== Lifestyle ===
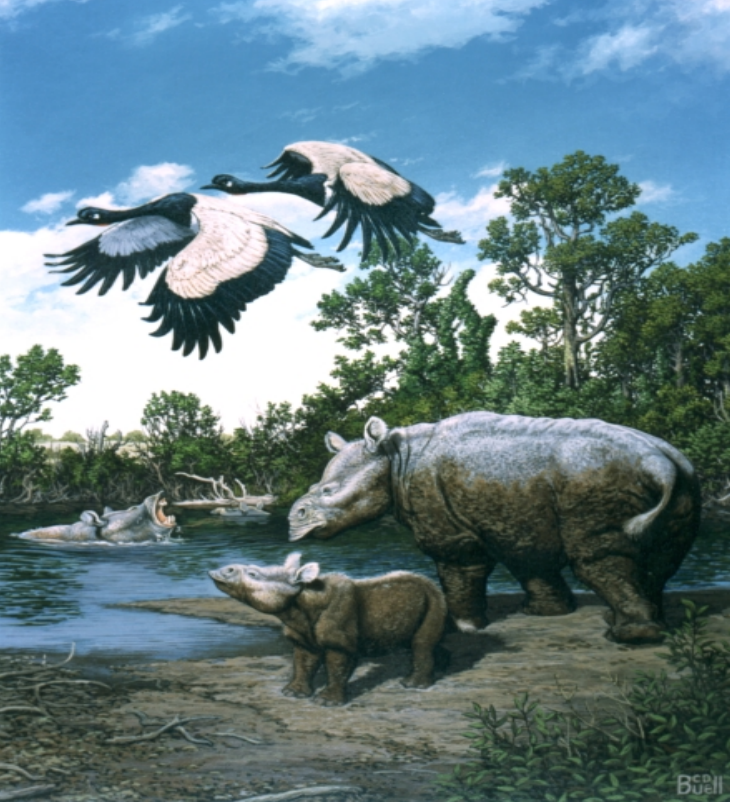
Life restoration of Metamynodon in its environment

All amynodonts have traditionally been interpreted as semiaquatic animals, and they have been nicknamed "swamp rhinoceroses". In large part, this interpretation has been derived from the anatomy of Metamynodon, which had the most derived semiaquatic adaptations.

Metamynodon had several adaptations that suggest a semiaquatic lifestyle. Metamynodon had reduced neural spines on its thoracic vertebrae, which indicates weak neck muscles and thus perhaps a lack of necessity to support the head while submerged. The rib cage of Metamynodon was also very broad, which though not strictly an adaptation for semiaquatic life suggests that its body shape may have been provided support by life in the water. The orbits of Metamynodon were placed relatively high on the skull, so that it could see while submerged in water, and it had retracted nasal bones, which may suggest nostrils positioned upwards on the snout, like in a hippopotamus, as well as limb proportions virtually identical to those of a hippopotamus.

In the late 20th century, Wall argued that the semiaquatic adaptations seen in Metamynodon are not seen in more basal amynodonts, such as Amynodon, nor in the cadurcodonts. In Amynodon, the orbits were not placed as high on the skull, but rather in the same position as in more basal rhinocerotoids, such as Hyrachyus. In cadurcodonts, the orbits were placed relatively low on the skull. Furthermore, non-metamynodonts did not have as broad bodies, nor as short limbs or reduced neural spines, as Metamynodon. Cadurcodonts were significantly more lightly built, which led Wall to interpret them as terrestrial animals, more similar to modern-day tapirs than to hippopotamuses. Wall also interpreted basal amynodonts, such as Amynodon, as subcursorial to mediportal terrestrial browsers. Oxygen isotope analyses of Amynodon tooth enamel in 2024 revealed relatively low δ^{18}O values, lower than contemporary land-dwelling brontotheres and close to the values of garfish scales. This data indicates that Amynodon did spend significant time in or near water, and that it thus may have been semiaquatic, albeit not as specialized for this lifestyle as Metamynodon.

=== Diet ===
The skull morphology of amynodonts indicates quite elaborate facial musculature. Amynodonts have been interpreted as successful browsers and grazers. They likely used their enlarged upper lips, and in the case of some amynodonts a prehensile proboscis, to pluck leaves and twigs from plants. Many later amynodonts developed higher-crowned cheek teeth (hypsodonty), which may have been an adaptation to cope with the coarser vegetation in the drier habitats of the Oligocene.

=== Sexual dimorphism ===
Certain traits have been interpreted as sexually dimorphic in amynodonts, including the size of the canines and overall body size.
