= Megalamynodon =

Megalamynodon Temporal range: Middle Eocene (late Uintan–Duchesnean), 42.8–37 Ma
- Underside of the paratype skull of M. regalis (CM 11958)

Scientific classification
- Kingdom: Animalia
- Phylum: Chordata
- Class: Mammalia
- Order: Perissodactyla
- Superfamily: Rhinocerotoidea
- Family: †Amynodontidae
- Tribe: †Metamynodontini
- Genus: †Megalamynodon; Wood, 1945
- Species: †M. regalis

Binomial name
- †Megalamynodon regalis Wood, 1945

Extinct genus of mammals

Megalamynodon ("big Amynodon") is an extinct genus of amynodont that lived in North America during the Middle Eocene, in the late Uintan to the Duchesnean land mammal age. A single species of Megalamynodon has been described, M. regalis, known from fossils found in the Duchesne River Formation of Utah.

Megalamynodon was a relatively large animal, with an estimated body mass of 1,380–1,450 kilograms (3,040–3,200 lb). The genus was originally described as a transitional form between Amynodon and Metamynodon. Although amynodont evolution has since been understood to have been more complex, the morphology of Megalamynodon is still considered relatively intermediate between primitive amynodonts such as Amynodon and the highly derived Metamynodon.

== Research history ==
Upper dentition of the M. regalis type specimen (CM 11953)

Megalamynodon regalis was described by Horace Elmer Wood in 1945, in a paper by William Berryman Scott on the fossil mammals of the Duchesne River Formation. The original fossils were found by a 1933 expedition from the Carnegie Museum, led by J. LeRoy Kay, in a quarry in the "Halfway horizon" of the Duchesne River Formation, twelve miles southwest of Vernal, Utah. In more recent stratigraphy of the formation, the Halfway horizon corresponds to the Brennan Basin Member. Because of Wood's active military service in the 1940s, Scott helped to finish the manuscript describing Megalamynodon and prepare it for publication, though Wood is given as the sole taxonomic authority for the species and genus.

The new genus and species were based on three fossil specimens, including a specimen preserving the mandible and both maxillae, with much of the upper and lower dentition (CM 11953, selected as the type specimen), a well-preserved partial basicranium including much of the upper dentition (CM 11958, selected as a paratype), and jaw fragments with some associated upper and lower teeth (CM 9961). Both Wood and Scott believed the fossils to represent an animal intermediate between Amynodon and Metamynodon, and thus a "missing link" between the two genera. Wood considered naming it as a new, advanced species of Amynodon, but was convinced by Scott to instead name it as a species of a new, "transitional genus".

In 1989, William P. Wall noted that the simplistic evolutionary lineage envisioned by Wood and Scott, from Amynodon to Megalamynodon to Metamynodon, was unrealistic, but that Megalamynodon in many respects did represent an intermediate form between Amynodon and Metamynodon. Wall revised the diagnosis of Megalamynodon, but found it to be a "difficult taxon to diagnose", preserving sufficient characteristics to be considered to belong to the derived Metamynodontini tribe, but otherwise being quite primitive.

== Description ==
Reconstruction of the skull of M. regalis

Megalamynodon was decidedly larger than Amynodon, but smaller than the largest specimens of Metamynodon. The body mass of M. regalis has been estimated at 1,380–1,450 kilograms (3,040–3,200 lb).

The skull of Megalamynodon was mesaticephalic (had an average width-length ratio) and, broadly speaking, intermediate in its morphology between more primitive amynodonts (e.g. Amynodon) and Metamynodon. The zygomatic arches of Megalamynodon were large and thickened, but not increased in height as they were in Metamynodon. The preorbital (in front of the eyes) portion of the skull of Megalamynodon was relatively long for a metamynodont, intermediate in length when compared to the preorbital portion of the skulls of Amynodon and Metamynodon.

Megalamynodon had the dental formula 3.1.3.33.1.2.3. The tusk-like canines of Megalamynodon were larger than those of Amynodon, but much smaller than those of Metamynodon. Megalamynodon had lost the lower second premolars, and had a relatively long diastema (gap between teeth) in the lower jaw between the canines and premolars. The lower cheek teeth (premolars and molars) had well-developed labial cingula. The third premolar of Megalamynodon was large, and double-rooted.

== Classification ==
Mandible of CM 11953

Left upper canine (left) and the second and third upper incisors (right) of CM 11953

Wall (1989) classified Megalamynodon in the amynodont tribe Metamynodontini. The genus has since consistently been recovered in Metamynodontini in phylogenetic analyses.

In 1989, Wall found the taxonomic relationship between Megalamynodon and the Asian genus Paramynodon to be "uncertain", "because of their primitive character states". Wall considered it possible that the two belonged to the same genus, in which case Megalamynodon would become a junior synonym of Paramynodon. Per Wall, Paramynodon is distinguished from Megalamynodon only by its reduced third premolar, and an enlarged glenoid shelf. Subsequent authors have all maintained Megalamynodon and Paramynodon as two distinct genera. The relationship between the two genera has varied slightly between analyses. In 2017, Averianov et al. recovered Megalamynodon, Paramynodon, and Metamynodon in a polytomy, whereas Tissier et al. (2018) recovered Megalamynodon as more derived than Paramynodon, as the sister taxon of a clade formed by Metamynodon and Sellamynodon. In 2023, Veine-Tonizzo et al. recovered Paramynodon and Megalamynodon in a clade within Metamynodontini. The Paramynodon + Megalamynodon clade was supported by two synapomorphies: the second and third incisor being of similar size, and the zygomatic process progressively diverging from the maxilla. The cladogram below presents the results of Veine-Tonizzo et al. (2023):

- Amynodontidae
  - Rostriamynodon grangeri
  - - Amynodon advenus
    - - Sharamynodon mongoliensis
      - - Metamynodontini
          - - Paramynodon birmanicus
            - Megalamynodon regalis
          - - Sellamynodon zimborensis
            - Metamynodon planifrons
        - Cadurcodontini
          - - Zaisanamynodon protheroi
            - Zaisanamynodon borisovi
          - - - - Amynodontopsis bodei
                - Amynodontopsis jiyuanensis
              - - Cadurcotherium cayluxi
                - Cadurcotherium minus
            - - Cadurcodon bahoensis
              - - Cadurcodon maomingensis
                - - Cadurcodon ardynensis
                  - Cadurcodon kazakademius

== Paleoecology ==
Megalamynodon lived during a timespan of profound climate transition in North America. In the Bridgerian, which preceded the Uintan, much of the continent had been dominated by lush, tropical forests. During the Uintan, when Megalamynodon made its first appearance, increasing aridity and mountain formation were heavily affecting the landscape and ecosystem, and much of North America began to be covered by open forest-savanna habitats. These trends continued during the Duchesnean, during which North America saw an even greater degree of habitat diversity.

The mammal fauna of the Brennan Basin Member of the Duchesne River Formation was intermediate between classic mammal faunas of the late Uintan, and the mammal fauna of the slightly later Lapoint Member of the formation. For the most part, the taxa were similar in composition to classic Uintan faunas, though the brontothere Duchesneodus, which was present, is more characteristic of later horizons, such as Lapoint. In addition to Megalamynodon and Duchesneodus, other perissodactyls known from the Brennan Basin Member include the tapiroid Heteraletes, and the rhinocerotoids Epitriplopus and Uintaceras. Other groups represented include various artiodactyls (such as Diplobunops, Leptotragulus, Pentacemylus, and Protoreodon), rodents, and lagomorphs.
