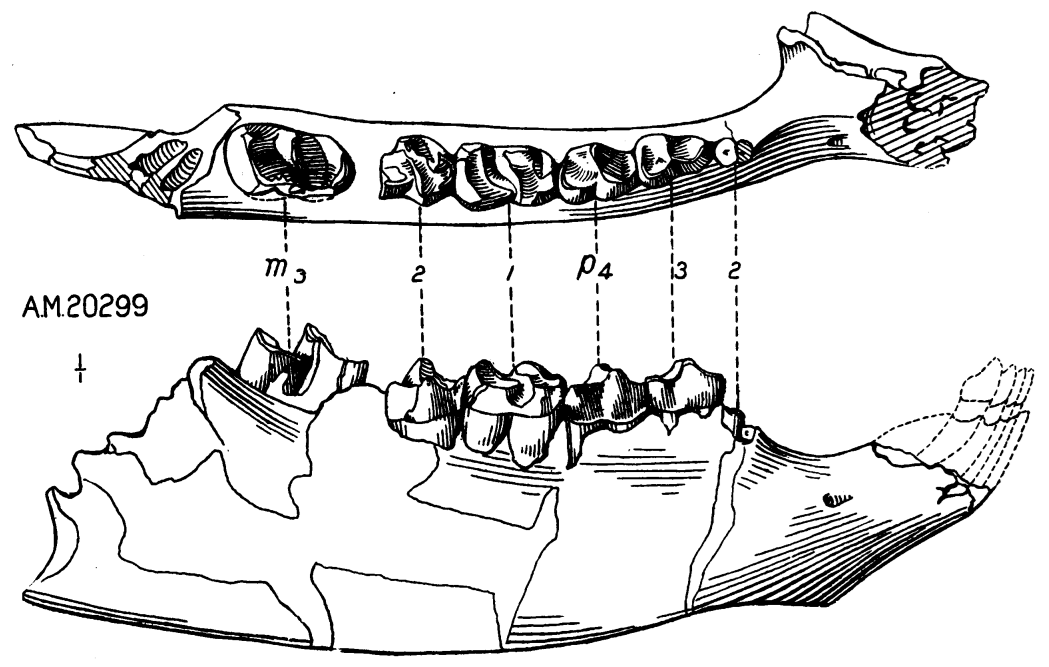
- Type jaw (AMNH 20299) of T. pretiosa

Scientific classification
- Kingdom: Animalia
- Phylum: Chordata
- Class: Mammalia
- Order: Perissodactyla
- Superfamily: Rhinocerotoidea
- Family: †Amynodontidae
- Genus: †Teilhardia; Matthew & Granger, 1926
- Species: †T. pretiosa

Binomial name
- †Teilhardia pretiosa Matthew & Granger, 1926

= Teilhardia =

Teilhardia Temporal range: Middle Eocene (Irdinmanhan), 47.8–42.7 Ma

Extinct genus of mammals

Teilhardia is an extinct genus of primitive amynodont that lived in East Asia during the Middle Eocene, in the Irdinmanhan land mammal age. A single species of Teilhardia has been described, T. pretiosa, known from fossils found in the Tukhum Formation of Inner Mongolia, China. Fossils from the Lumeiyi Formation in southwestern China have also tentatively been referred to Teilhardia.

Teilhardia was a small animal. It may have been ancestral to the slightly larger Caenolophus, another genus of primitive amynodonts. The primitive nature of Teilhardia has made precise classification somewhat difficult, but the genus is considered to be linked to more derived amynodonts by the relatively short length of its premolar series compared to its molar series.

== Research history ==
Teilhardia pretiosa was briefly described by William Diller Matthew and Walter W. Granger in 1926, based on a lower jaw (AMNH 20299), reportedly found at the base of the Shara Murun Formation in the "red layers" of Ula Usu in Inner Mongolia, China. AMNH 20299 preserves much of the cheek teeth, from the third premolar to the third molar. In 1927, the formation of the relevant rock layers was reassessed as the distinct Tukhum Formation. The correct horizon of AMNH 20299 is disputed, since the fossil was reportedly found associated with "typical Sharamurunian taxa". Teilhardia is nevertheless typically dated the Irdinmanhan land mammal age, preceding the Sharamurunian age of the Shara Murun Formation.

Fossils that might belong to T. pretiosa, and possibly an additional new species of Teilhardia, have been reported from the Lumeiyi Formation in Lunan, Yunnan, southwestern China. In 2018, Bai et al. reported that recent fieldwork in the "red layers" of Inner Mongolia had uncovered additional fossils from T. pretiosa, though they did not describe these new specimens.

== Description ==
Teilhardia was a very small rhinocerotoid. The series of premolar to molar teeth in the type specimen measures 55 millimetres (2.2 in), and the molar series by itself measures 35 millimetres (1.4 in).

Teilhardia had primitive rhinocerotoid teeth; all of the premolars were reduced in size, though the second premolar retained two roots and the third and fourth were submolariform (somewhat molar-like). The molars of Teilhardia increased in size slightly from the first molar to the third molar.

== Classification ==
Matthew and Granger interpreted Teilhardia as a hyracodont, possibly an ancestral form to Ardynia. In 1967, Leonard Radinsky suggested that Teilhardia's relatively short premolar series relative to its molar series could mean that it is a primitive amynodont, possibly ancestral to Caenolophus, another primitive amynodont. Caenolophus was slightly larger than Teilhardia, and also has a short premolar series. In 1986, William P. Wall and Earl Manning opinioned that AMNH 20299 was not sufficiently different from fossils assigned to Caenolophus to justify Teilhardia as a distinct genus.

Later researchers have consistently maintained Teilhardia as a distinct genus. Bai et al. (2018) classified Teilhardia as a hyracodont. Other than Bai et al. (2018), the consensus is that Teilhardia represents a primitive amynodont; Spencer & Emry (1996), Tsubamoto (2000), Missiaen (2011), and Bai et al. (2020) all classified Teilhardia as an amynodont.

== Paleoecology ==
The Erlian Basin, in which the Tukhum Formation is situated, experienced a subtropical and humid climate during the Eocene. The vegetation was highly diverse and dominated by deciduous trees and shrubs. The Tukhum Formation is considered to be coeval in age with the better studied Ulan Shireh Formation. Because of confusion surrounding the stratigraphy of the region, it is not clear what taxa actually belong to the Tukhum Formation. Other than Teilhardia, fossils that have been reported include brontothere fossils, as well as fossils of rodents and lagomorphs, though these may likewise actually belong to the Shara Murun Formation.

The paleoenvironment of southern China, including what is today Yunnan (and thus the Lumeiyi Formation), during the Eocene was probably warmer and moister than in northern China. Fossils have been referred to Teilhardia from the lower part of the Lumeiyi Formation. In addition to Teilhardia, the lower Lumeiyi Formation preserves fossils from several other amynodonts, including Caenolophus, as well as more derived forms such as Paramynodon and Lushiamynodon. Other perissodactyls represented include deperetellids, paraceratheres, helaletids, lophialetids, rhodopagids, and brontotheres. Other mammal groups known from the lower Lumeiyi Formation include anthracotheres, helohyids, creodonts, nimravids, mesonychids, and tillodonts.
