= Vera Gromova =

Russian paleontologist

Vera Isaakovna Gromova (Russian: Вера Исааковна Громова, 8 March 8, 1891 Orenburg – 21 January, 1973) was a Soviet paleontologist known for her studies of fossil ungulates (hoofed mammals). She worked at the Russian Academy of Sciences, where from 1919 to 1942 she was head of osteology, Zoological Museum, and from 1942 to 1960 at the Paleontological Institute, where she was head of the mammal laboratory from 1946 onward. Her works include The history of horse (genus Equus) in the Old World (1949) and Fundamentals of Paleontology: Mammals (1968).

== Life ==
Gromova was born on 8 March 1891 in Orenburg. She was educated at the Orenburg Women's Gymnasium until 1908, where she earned a gold medal. She then transferred to St Petersburg to 1911, and then in Moscow from 1912 to 1918, where she earned a degree in vertebrate zoology.

Gromova was a paleontologist, who was known for her studies of fossil ungulates (hoofed mammals). She worked at the Russian Academy of Sciences, where from 1919 to 1942 she was head of osteology, Zoological Museum, and from 1942 to 1960 at the Paleontological Institute, where she was head of mammal laboratory from 1946 onward. Gromova is known particularly for her research on odd-toed mammals, perissodactyls. Her works include The history of horse (genus Equus) in the Old World (1949) and Fundamentals of Paleontology: Mammals (1968). She also oversaw publication of four volumes of the Transactions of the Palaeontological Institute, and edited the Mammalia volume of the Osnovy Paleontologii, published in 1962.
