= Naduo Formation =

Geologic formation in Guangxi, China

- Stratigraphic range: Middle or Late Eocene
- Type: Formation
- Underlies: Gongkang Formation
- Overlies: Bose Basin

Location
- Region: Guangxi
- Country: China

The Naduo Formation or Nadu Formation is a geologic formation in Guangxi, southern China. The Naduo Formation preserves fossils dating back to the Middle or Late Eocene epoch of the Paleogene period, including a relatively diverse fauna of mammals.

== Paleoenvironment ==
In 1999, Gengwu Liu and Rongyu Yang published a study of fossil pollen collected in the Naduo Formation, identifying a diverse flora of 160 species, in 121 genera and 62 families. Based on the pollen, they could determine that the paleoenvironment of the Naduo Formation was likely a lowland basin, covered by a mixed evergreen and deciduous broad-leaved forest, probably similar to the environments that still dominate southern China today.

== Mammal fossils ==
=== Aegialodontia ===
Genus/family	Species	Notes/affinities	Images
Eodesmatodon	E. spanios		

=== Artiodactyla ===
Genus/family	Species	Notes/affinities	Images
Anthracothema	A. rubricae	An anthracothere.	
Anthracokeryx	A. birmanicus	An anthracothere. The fossil record of Anthracokeryx in the Naduo Formation is very poor, and species assignments are questionable. A. moriturus may also be a synonym of Anthracotherium crassum. The recognition of Microbunodon in the Naduo Formation in 2010 casts doubt on identification of Anthracokeryx, since the two genera are difficult to tell apart dentally.	
Anthracokeryx	A. moriturus	An anthracothere. The fossil record of Anthracokeryx in the Naduo Formation is very poor, and species assignments are questionable. A. moriturus may also be a synonym of Anthracotherium crassum. The recognition of Microbunodon in the Naduo Formation in 2010 casts doubt on identification of Anthracokeryx, since the two genera are difficult to tell apart dentally.	
Anthracokeryx	A. sp.	An anthracothere. The fossil record of Anthracokeryx in the Naduo Formation is very poor, and species assignments are questionable. A. moriturus may also be a synonym of Anthracotherium crassum. The recognition of Microbunodon in the Naduo Formation in 2010 casts doubt on identification of Anthracokeryx, since the two genera are difficult to tell apart dentally.	
Bothriodon?	B. chyelingensis	An anthracothere.	
Choeropotamidae or Helohyidae gen. nov.		A new (undescribed) genus and species of cheropotamid or helohyid.	
Entelodontidae	Entelodontidae indet.	An indeterminate entelodont.	
Gobiomeryx	G. sp.	A ruminant.	
Heothema	H. bellia	An anthracothere.	
Heothema	H. media	An anthracothere.	
Huananothema	H. imparilica	An anthracothere.	
Indomeryx	I. cotteri	A ruminant.	
Microbunodon	M. sp.	An anthracothere.	
Notomeryx	N. besensis	A ruminant.	
Notomeryx	N. major	A ruminant.	
Suidae gen. nov. A	sp. nov.	A new (undescribed) genus and species of suid.	
Suidae gen. nov. B	sp. nov.	A new (undescribed) genus and species of suid.	
Tayassuidae gen. nov.	sp. nov.	A new (undescribed) genus and species of peccary.	
Tragulidae	Tragulidae indet.	A ruminant.	

=== Carnivora ===
Genus/family	Species	Notes/affinities	Images
Cephalogale	C. sp. nov.	A hemicyonine ("dog bear").	
cf. Cephalogale	cf. C. sp.	A hemicyonine ("dog bear").	
Guangxicyon	G. sinoamericanus	An amphicyonid ("bear-dog"). Previously treated under the nomen nudum "Guangxicynodon sinocaliforniae".	
Pachycynodon?	P.? sp.	An amphicynodontid.	

=== Hyaenodontia ===
Genus/family	Species	Notes/affinities	Images
Propterodon?	P.? sp.	A hyaenodontid.	

=== Mesonychia ===
Genus/family	Species	Notes/affinities	Images
Guilestes	G. acares	A mesonychid.	
Guilestes	G. cf. acares	A mesonychid.	
cf. Harpagolestes	cf. H. sp.	A mesonychid.	

=== Perissodactyla ===
Genus/family	Species	Notes/affinities	Images
Caenolophus	C. sp.	An amynodont.	
Deperetella	D. sp.	A deperetellid.	
Eomoropus	E. cf. quadridentatus	An eomoropid.	
Guixia	G. simplex	A rhinoceros.	
Huananodon	H. hui	An amynodont.	
"Metatelmatherium"	"M". cf. brownii	A brontothere. "Metatelmatherium" brownii does not belong to the genus Metatelmatherium, and the poor fossil material makes it difficult to identify. It may be a synonym of the dubious brontothere Sivatitanops birmanicum.	
Paramynodon	P. sp.	An amynodont.	
