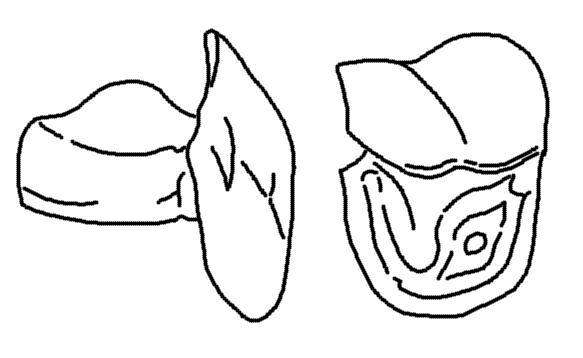
- Illustration of the H. hypsodonta holotype tooth crown (IVPP V.5006), in side and top view

Scientific classification
- Kingdom: Animalia
- Phylum: Chordata
- Class: Mammalia
- Order: Perissodactyla
- Superfamily: Rhinocerotoidea
- Family: †Amynodontidae
- Genus: †Huananodon; You, 1977

Type species
- †Huananodon hypsodonta You, 1977

Other species
- †H. hui You, 1977

= Huananodon =

Huananodon Temporal range: Middle or Late Eocene

Extinct genus of mammals

Huananodon ("Huanan tooth") is an extinct genus of amynodont that lived in East Asia during the Middle or Late Eocene. Huananodon is known only from isolated fossil teeth found in southern China. Two species of Huananodon have been named, the type species H. hypsodonta from the Gongkang Formation and H. hui from the Naduo Formation.

Little is known of Huananodon on account of the poor fossil material, and the validity of the genus has sometimes been questioned. Recent studies have affirmed Huananodon as distinct, with teeth distinguishable from other amynodonts by high tooth crowns and a high degree of molarization (becoming molar-like) of the premolars. The large size of the teeth of Huananodon and the unique dental features suggest that it was a large and specialized amynodont.

== Research history ==
Huananodon hypsodonta and Huananodon hui were described by Y. Z. You in 1977, based on fossils from Guangxi, China. Both species are based mainly on isolated upper premolars. H. hypsodonta was based on the upper right second premolar tooth crown IVPP V.5006, found in Baise, Guanxi, in the Gongkang Formation. Additional teeth from the same site were also referred to H. hypsodonta, including additional premolars and a partial second upper molar. H. hui was based on several associated premolars and fragments of incisors and canines (IVPP V.5008), from Tiandong, Guanxi, in the Naduo Formation. You distinguished Huananodon from other amynodonts mainly by its unusually high tooth crowns, especially the height of the outer walls of the teeth.

=== Validity ===
In 1986, William P. Wall and Earl Manning argued that the type specimens of both Huananodon species were extremely poor specimens that cannot even clearly be identified as belonging to amynodonts, and Wall later considered Huananodon a nomen dubium. In 1989, Donald Prothero and Robert M. Schoch accepted Huananodon as a valid amynodont genus. In 2019, Bin Bai, Jin Meng, Fang-Yuan Mao, Zhao-Qun Zhang, and Yuan-Qing Wang also recognized Huananodon as an amynodont, and found that the premolars are molarized to a higher degree in Huananodon than in other Asian amynodonts, which suggests that Huananodon represents a distinct amynodont genus.

== Description ==
Huananodon is very poorly known. Based on the size and unique features of its teeth, Y. Z. You determined that it was a very large and specialized amynodont. The only measurements published by You are of the upper teeth of H. hypsodonta:

Measurement	Second premolar	Third premolar	Second
Length	28 millimeters (1.1 in)	32 millimeters (1.3 in)	74 millimeters (2.9 in)
Width	38 millimeters (1.5 in)	44 millimeters (1.7 in)	77 millimeters (3.0 in)
Tooth crown height	40 millimeters (1.6 in)	42 millimeters (1.7 in)	88 millimeters (3.5 in)

== Classification ==
Prothero & Schoch (1989) classified Huananodon as incertae sedis in Amynodontidae. In 1998, Esperanza Cerdenõ considered Huananodon to be a rhinocerotid rather than an amynodont, but noted that this was doubtful and that "many Asian taxa need a full revision". Tsubamoto et al. (2000) followed Cerdenõ in provisionally listing Huananodon as a rhinocerotid. Bai et al. (2019) reaffirmed Huananodon's placement in the amynodonts by pointing out that its teeth showed a pattern of premolar molarization (premolars becoming more molar-like) through separation between the protocone and the metaconule, a feature known in perissodactyls only in the amynodonts.

== Paleoecology ==
The precise ages of the Gongkang and Naduo formations are disputed. They were originally treated as either Late Eocene or Early Oligocene in age. Stratigraphic revisions of Asian mammal faunas have since shifted the Eocene–Oligocene boundary; sites formerly considered Early Oligocene are now considered Late Eocene, and sites formerly considered Late Eocene are now considered late Middle Eocene. The Gongkang and Naduo formations are variously described as Middle or Late Eocene in age.

The Naduo Formation preserves a diverse mammal fauna. Among the perissodactyls, H. hui coexisted with the rhinoceros Guixia simplex, brontotheres, the chalicotherioid Eomoropus, the deperetellid Deperetella sp., and other species of amynodonts tentatively identified as Paramynodon sp. and Caenolophus sp. Carnivorans were represented by the bear Cephalogale, the amphicyonid Guangxicyon, and a amphicynodontid, perhaps Pachycynodon. Hyaenodonts were also present, perhaps belongong to the genus Propterodon, as were different mesonychids (Guilestes and cf. Harpagolestes). Among the artiodactyls, the Naduo Formation preserves unidentified fossils of entelodonts, peccaries, suids, and possibly choeropotamids; several ruminants are also known (the genera Notomeryx, Indomeryx, and Gobiomeryx), as well as a large number of anthracotheres (including Anthracothema, Anthracokeryx, Bothriodon?, Heothema, and Huananothema).

The Gongkong Formation preserves a smaller number of mammals. Fellow perissodactyls included the rhinoceros Guixia yougiangensis, the chalicothere Schizotherium, and the paracerathere Forstercooperia. Two carnivorans are known from the Gongkong Formation, an unidentified machairodont and a nimravid, possibly Hoplophoneus. Artiodactyls were represented by the peccary Eopecarihyus, as well as a similar diversity of anthracotheres as in the Naduo Formation (Anthracokeryx, Bothriodon?, and Heothema).
