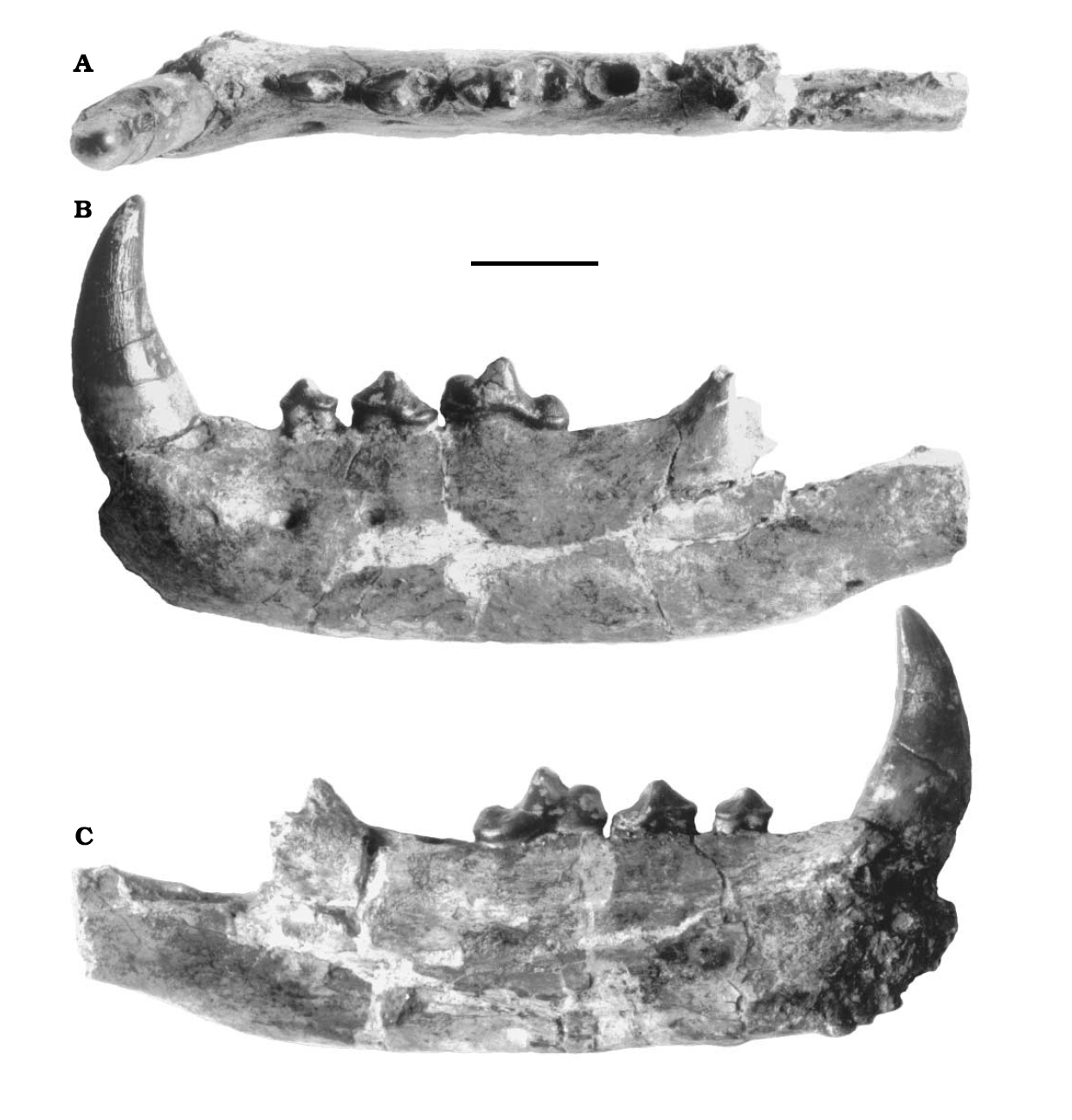
- Lower jaw

Scientific classification
- Kingdom: Animalia
- Phylum: Chordata
- Class: Mammalia
- Infraclass: Placentalia
- Order: Carnivora
- Family: †Amphicyonidae
- Genus: †Guangxicyon; Zhai et al., 2003
- Species: †G. sinoamericanus

Binomial name
- †Guangxicyon sinoamericanus Zhai et al., 2003

= Guangxicyon =

Guangxicyon Temporal range: ?Late Eocene

Extinct genus of carnivores

Guangxicyon is a medium-sized, extinct genus of amphicyonid carnivoran, or "bear dog," which inhabited southern China during the Late Eocene. It is notable for being the oldest member of its family known from Asia, and is characterized by a shortened face and atypical, bunodont dentition. It inhabited a subtropical forest shaped by monsoon climate not unlike the one present in the region where it was found today. Only a single species, Guangxicyon sinoamericanus, is known.

== Discovery and taxonomy ==
The only fossils attributable to Guangxicyon sinoamericanus were originally found in 1983 in Late Eocene rocks from the Baise (also known as Bose) Basin belonging to the Nadu Formation, and include a mandible, a tibia, and a humerus. It was first published as Guangxicynodon sinocaliforniae, though this turned out to be a nomen nudum, before being officially described in 2003. The genus name is a reference to the province of Guangxi, where it was discovered, while the species name honors the joint Sino-American research team that discovered it.

== Description ==
Guangxicyon was a short-faced amphicyonid, with aberrant dentition and a deep horizontal ramus. The depth of the latter below the masseteric fossa is much deeper than that of true canids such as Enhydrocyon, and comparable to that of the later amphicyonid Cynelos. The mandibular symphysis is not fused. While the canine is large, as in other members of the family, the incisors, as well as several of the premolars and molars, are not preserved. However, based on the alveoli, the first two premolars are reconstructed as being single-rooted and reduced. The fourth premolar lacks the posterior accessory cusp usually seen in its relatives. The second and third molar also appear to be reduced and single-rooted. Both premolars and molars lack accessory cups, and are bunodont. Guangxicyon differs from other short-faced amphicyonids and true canids in the simplification and reduction of its cheek teeth, which are blunter, shorter, and less compressed than in taxa such as Brachyrhynchocyon and Enhydrocyon. The reduction of both its anterior (situated towards the front) premolars and posterior (back) molars, as well as all these teeth being single-rooted, makes it distinct among amphicyonids. Typically, the presence of a short face is associated with the loss of at least some teeth. For comparison, the shortening of the snout as seen in Brachycyon is achieved through the crowding of its cheek teeth in regard to the roots of its second premolar and molar, in Enhydrocyon by the loss of the first premolar and sometimes last molar, as well as the oblique reorientation of its remaining premolars, and in Aktaucyon by the reduction of the first upper premolar.

The length of the humerus is estimated to have been 205 mm, and that of the tibia 165 mm. Compared to other amphicyonids, the anatomy of these bones is relatively similar to that of Amphicyon, though more robust and relatively shorter. The distal condyles on the humerus and tibia are broader than in Cynelos and Brachycyon, indicating a less cursorial lifestyle, and a gait more similar to the ancestral condition in amphicyonids.

Based on an equation using its first molar, its body mass has been estimated at roughly 10.6 kg. This makes it larger than most early arctoids such as Amphicynodon, Cephalogale, and Angelarctocyon, though smaller than Lonchocyon.

== Evolutionary Relationships ==
The origin of the amphicyonids, and their continent of origin, remain obscure, and are a matter of significant debate. This uncertainty is a result of the plesiomorphic and homoplastic traits shared by most early members of this family, as well as the poor fossil record in Middle Eocene Asia. The oldest remains of the family belong to the North American genus Daphoenus, and date to the Middle Eocene. Possibly even older remains have been reported from the Chinese Lushi Basin and Ulan Shireh Formation, and have been referred to the basal amphicyonid Cynodictis. However, various non-amphicyonid remains have wrongfully been assigned to this genus in the past, and it is likely that this is also the case with the remains reported from China. Cynodictis is most possibly restricted to Europe, where it appeared from MP18 (~36-35 Ma) onwards. The affinities of purported amphicyonid remains from Eocene Myanmar have similarly been doubted. Therefore, the oldest known Asian members of the family date to the Late Eocene, and include Guangxicyon as well as an as yet unnamed taxon from Mongolia.

Among early amphicyonids, Guangxicyon stands out for its large size (it is approximately 270% bigger than Angelarctocyon) and aberrant dentition, suggesting that it is considerably more derived than contemporary genera from North America, possibly being more closely related to later amphicyonines. The presence of this taxon suggests that East Asia may have either served as an important area for diversification or even cradle of the family. However, the relationship between this genus and other amphicyonids is poorly understood.

== Paleoecology ==
Type location of Guangxicyon

The age of the Nadu Fauna, where the only known remains of Guangxicyon have been discovered, is a matter of debate. Various studies have concluded, on the basis of mammal and pollen fossils as well as lithofacies, that it is of Late Eocene age. However, Xie et al. suggest that the Formation might be Middle Eocene in age, as it shares several artiodactyl taxa with the Pondaung Fauna of Myanmar (40.1–38.6 Ma). Rust et al. disagree with this claim, noting that the derived anthracothere Microbunodon is found at Nadu, but not Pondaung, indicating that the former is younger than the latter. They instead assert that it correlates more closely to the Krabi Fauna of Thailand, as both share the genus Siamochoerus. Based on the distinct mammal fauna of the formation, which differs greatly from that of northern China, a separate Chinese land mammal age, the Naduan, wedged between the Sharamurunian and Ulangochuian has been proposed. However, Wang et al. is critical of this idea, and notes that in the Erlian Basin, the mammal faunas of the Sharamurunian and Ulangochuian, and do not allow a significant gap between the two epochs for the Naduan to be situated in. Therefore, the Nadua Fauna is most likely of Sharamurunian age, with the difference in fauna likely being explainable by the differences in habitat between northern and southeastern China during this period. Ni et al. follows this correlation, and consequently dates the Nadu-Dongjun fauna to 41 to 38 Ma.

The pollen assemblage of the Nadu Formation is dominated by the families Fagaceae, Ulmaceae, Betulaceae, and Juglandace, which, together with a variety of subtropical and tropical plant species, suggesting that the lowland basin was covered by a mixed evergreen and deciduous broad-leaved forest. The relative common occurrence of pollen belonging to the pine family can likely be explained by the presence of a mountainous conifer forest nearby, while the presence of mangroves is linked to the proximity to the ocean. With a humid subtropical climate, the environment was likely similar to that found in southern China today. The presence of the podocarp Podocarpoxylon donghuaiense also supports this, with the distinct growth rings suggesting a seasonal climate. A seasonal climate is also supported by the δ^{18}O of mollusk shells. During the Middle to Late Eocene, southern China was likely influenced by a monsoon climate, with precipitation being significantly higher in summer than in winter, albeit the difference is not as pronounced as today. The average annual temperature of the Baise Basin has been estimated to lie between 16.5 and 22.2 °C, with a mean annual precipitation of 1035 to 1298 mm.

Besides Guangxicyon, other possible Carnivoran remains from this formation have been referred to Pachycynodon and Cephalogale, but the actual taxonomic affinity of these specimens is uncertain. Other carnivorous mammals mentioned in faunal lists include the mesonychian Guilestes and a taxon similar to Harpagolestes, and possibly also the hyaenodont Propterodon. The fauna preserves a diverse assemblage of artiodactyls, including the ruminants Gobiomeryx, Indomeryx and Notomeryx, as well as the suoids Siamochoerus and Huaxiachoerus, the oldest fossils belonging to the anthracothere Microbunodon, and undescribed chevrotains and peccaries. Perissodactyls are represented by the early chalicothere Eomoropus and the rhinoceros Guixia, while the presence of the amynodont Paramynodon, and the brontothere Metatelmatherium is less certain. The presence of the 'phenacodont' Eodesmatodon and the primate Palaeohodites is also notable.
