= Paracadurcodon =

Paracadurcodon Temporal range: Late Eocene (Ulangochuian), 39.9–37.8 Ma

Scientific classification
- Kingdom: Animalia
- Phylum: Chordata
- Class: Mammalia
- Order: Perissodactyla
- Superfamily: Rhinocerotoidea
- Family: †Amynodontidae
- Tribe: †Cadurcodontini
- Genus: †Paracadurcodon; Xu, 1966
- Species: †P. suhaituensis

Binomial name
- †Paracadurcodon suhaituensis Xu, 1966

Synonyms
- Cadurcodon suhaituensis (Xu, 1966); P. alashensis Qi, 1975 (nomen nudum)

Extinct genus of mammals

Paracadurcodon ("beside Cadurcodon") is an extinct genus of amynodont that lived in East Asia during the Late Eocene, in the Ulangochuian land mammal age. A single species of Paracadurcodon has been described, P. suhaituensis, known from fragmentary fossils found in the Chaganbulage Formation of Inner Mongolia, China.

Paracadurcodon was originally described as a more primitive relative of Cadurcodon; however, its fossils have been argued to fall within the range of variation observed in that genus, possibly rendering Paracadurcodon a junior synonym of Cadurcodon.

== Research history ==
Paracadurcodon suhaituensis was described by Xu Yu-Xuan in 1966, based on dentary fragments and isolated teeth found at Suhaitu, in the Chaganbulage Formation of Inner Mongolia, China. Xu selected the dentary IVPP V.3219 as the type specimen. Xu considered it possible that fossils attributed to the genus Amynodon from the Lumeiyi Formation in Yunnan, southern China, may belong to Paracadurcodon.

In 1975, Qi Tao erroneously used the name Paracadurcodon alashensis for the fossils described by Xu in 1966.

== Description ==
Based on dental measurements, Paracadurcodon was similar in size to Cadurcodon ardynensis, the smallest known species of Cadurcodon. Although based on fragmentary fossils, P. suhaituensis was diagnosed as a distinct genus particularly based on the presence of a single pair of lower incisors, three lower premolars, and a very short mandibular symphysis.

== Classification ==
Xu considered Paracadurcodon to be more primitive than Cadurcodon, to which he believed Paracadurcodon to be closely related.

=== Possible synonymy with Cadurcodon ===
In 1989, William P. Wall wrote that the dentary used by Xu to define Paracadurcodon was "very similar to Cadurcodon", but that Xu's photograph of the fossil was not detailed enough to be able to thoroughly compare it to fossils of Cadurcodon. In the same year, Donald Prothero and Robert M. Schoch designated Paracadurcodon as a junior synonym of Cadurcodon.

In 2017, Alexander Averianov, Igor Danilov, Jin Jinhua, and Wang Yingyong argued that Paracadurcodon was a synonym of Cadurcodon, and reclassified P. suhauituensis as C. suhaituensis. Averianov et al. argued that the presence of the second pair of lower premolars was known to be an individually variable trait in Cadurcodon ardynensis, which undermined the usefulness of this trait in distinguishing Paracadurcodon. Paracadurcodon has continued to see use as a valid genus after 2017.

== Paleoecology ==
The Chaganbule Formation was originally considered to be Early Oligocene in age. Xu assessed it as such in 1966, noting that it was probably earlier in age than the Ergilin Dzo Formation. Reassessments of the ages of mammalian faunas in North America and Asia during the 1990s led many Chinese formations formerly considered to be Early Oligocene to be reassessed as Late Eocene. Based on the geological ranges of the mammals found in the Chaganbule Formation, Wang Banyue and Wang Peiyu reassessed the Chaganbule Formation as Late Eocene in 1997. Presently, the formation is correlated to the Ulangochuian land mammal age.

The Chaganbule fauna included several other perissodactyls, including brontotheres (Embolotherium), other amynodonts ("Amynodon" alxaensis and Sianodon), indeterminate rhinocerotids, and deperetellids (Teleolophus). Other mammalian groups represented included artiodactyls (Lophiomeryx and indeterminate cervids), mesonychids (Harpagolestes alxaensis), lagomorphs (Gobiolagus), as well as rodents and insectivores.
