= Chaganbulage Formation =

Geologic formation in Inner Mongolia, China

- Stratigraphic range: Late Middle Eocene or Late Eocene (Ulangochuian)
- Type: Formation

Location
- Region: Inner Mongolia
- Country: China

The Chaganbulage Formation, also called the Qaganbulag Formation, is a geologic formation in Inner Mongolia, northern China. The deposits of the Chaganbulage Formation date to the late Middle Eocene or Late Eocene, (Note: The Chaganbulage Formation was previously erroneously dated to the Early Oligocene, as its fauna was correlated with contemporaneous mammal faunas in North America then dated to the Oligocene. Following revisions of the North American land mammal ages in the 1990s, the Chaganbulage Formation was redated to the Eocene by Wang Banyue and Wang Peiyu in 1997.) and its mammal fossils are correlated to the Ulangochuian land mammal age.

== Fossil fauna ==
=== Artiodactyla ===
Genus/family	Species	Notes/affinities	Images
Cervidae	Cervidae indet.	Supposedly a cervid.	
Lophiomeryx	L. cf. gracilis	A lophiomerycid.	

=== "Insectivora" ===
Genus/family	Species	Notes/affinities	Images
"Insectivora"	"Insectivora" indet.	An insectivore.	

=== Lagomorpha ===
Genus/family	Species	Notes/affinities	Images
Gobiolagus	G. cf. andrewsi	A leporid.	

=== Mesonychia ===
Genus/family	Species	Notes/affinities	Images
Harpagolestes	H. alxaensis	A mesonychid.	

=== Perissodactyla ===
Genus/family	Species	Notes/affinities	Images
"Amynodon"	"A". alxaensis	An amynodont. "A". alxaensis does not belong to the genus Amynodon, but its classification is pending re-examination of the fossil material.	
Brontotheriidae	Brontotheriidae indet.	A brontothere	
Embolotherium	E. grangeri	A brontothere	
Paracadurcodon	P. suhaituensis	An amynodont.	
Rhinocerotidae	Rhinocerotidae indet.	A rhinoceros	
Sianodon	S. sp.	An amynodont.	
Teleolophus	T. magnus	A deperetellid.	
Teleolophus	T. cf. medius	A deperetellid.	

=== Rodentia ===
Genus/family	Species	Notes/affinities	Images
Ctenodactylidae	Ctenodactylidae gen. et sp. nov.	A gundi.	
