= Honghe Formation =

Geologic formation in Shaanxi, China

- Stratigraphic range: Middle Eocene
- Type: Formation
- Unit of: Weihe Basin
- Underlies: Bailuyuan Formation
- Thickness: c. 200 m (650 ft)

Location
- Region: Shaanxi
- Country: China

The Honghe Formation, also called the Hongho Formation, is a geologic formation in Shaanxi, China. The Honghe Formation preserves fossils dating back to the Middle Eocene epoch of the Paleogene period.

== Geology ==
The Honghe Formation consists mainly of purple-red mudstones, fine sandstones, and sandy mudstones. The Honghe Formation is the lowermost Cenozoic stratigraphic unit in the region, and underlies the Bailuyuan Formation. Exposures of the Honghe are about 200 meters (650 feet) thick.

== Paleoenvironment ==
The paleoenvironment of the Honghe Formation was warm and humid, and consisted of tropical to subtropical evergreen broad-leaved and deciduous broad-leaved forests, as well as mixed deciduous broad-leaved and coniferous forests.

== Fossils ==
=== Mammals ===
Few mammal taxa have been securely identified in the Honghe Formation, all of them perissodactyls.

Genus/family	Species	Locality	Fossils	Notes/affinities
Arctotitan	A. honghoensis	Yinbocun	Part of a skull	A very large brontothere
Breviodon	B. minutus?	Cangyuancun	Two well-preserved teeth	A lophialetid
cf. Deperetella	cf. D. sp.	Yinbocun		A deperetellid
Tapiroidea	T. indet.	Cangyuancun	Small number of isolated teeth	An indeterminate tapiroid.

=== Reptiles ===
Fossils of trionychid turtles have been found at the Yinbocun locality.
