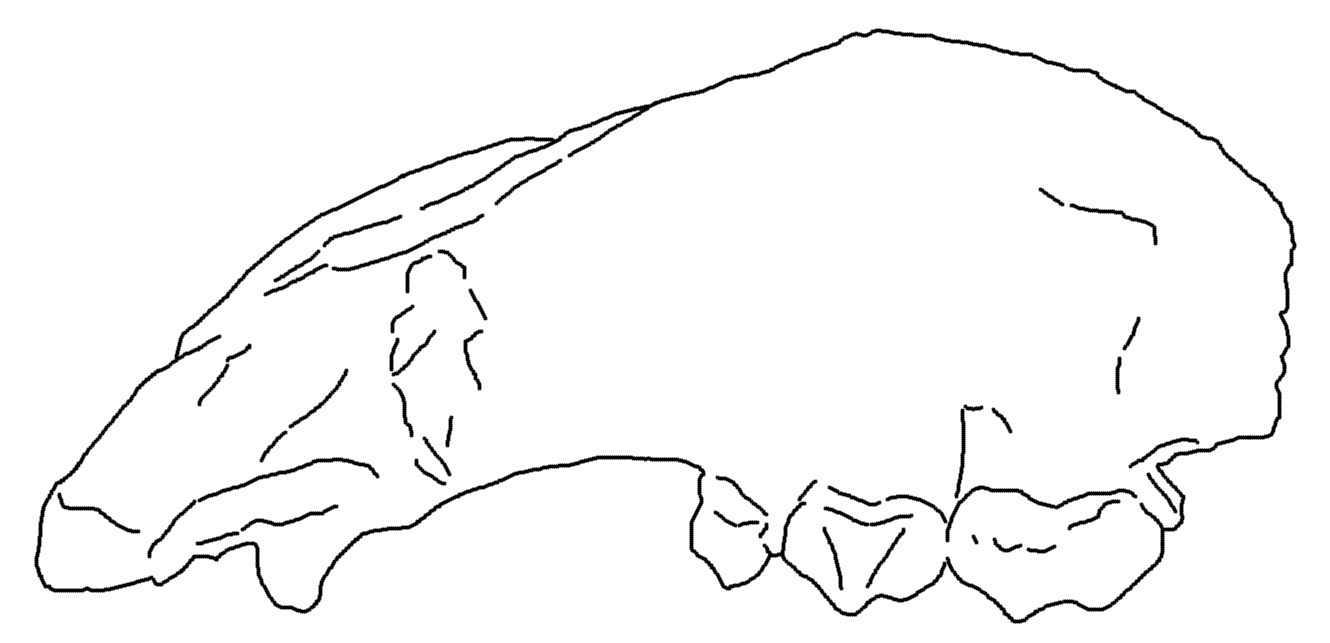
- Drawing of the A. honghoensis type specimen (IVPP V.3201)

Scientific classification
- Kingdom: Animalia
- Phylum: Chordata
- Class: Mammalia
- Order: Perissodactyla
- Family: †Brontotheriidae
- Subfamily: †Brontotheriinae
- Tribe: †Brontotheriini
- Subtribe: †Brontotheriina (?)
- Genus: †Arctotitan; Wang, 1978
- Species: †A. honghoensis

Binomial name
- †Arctotitan honghoensis Wang, 1978

= Arctotitan =

Arctotitan Temporal range: Middle Eocene (Irdinmanhan), 45 Ma

Extinct genus of mammals

Arctotitan (lit. 'bear titan') is a dubious extinct genus of brontothere, possibly a horned brontothere, known from the Middle Eocene of East Asia. A single species has been described, A. honghoensis, based on a skull fragment from the Honghe Formation in Shaanxi, China. The size of the only known fossil indicates that Arctotitan was an extremely large brontothere, similar in size to the largest brontotheres known from the Late Eocene.

== Research history ==
Arctotitan honghoensis was described by Wang Banyue in 1978, based on a fragment of a skull (IVPP V.3201), preserving part of the premaxillomaxillary rostrum (the part of the jaw extending below the nasal incision), and some of the teeth (right and left first and second pairs of incisors, and left first to third premolar). The fossil was found in the Honghe Formation in Shaanxi, China, at a locality named Yinpocun, near Xi'an. The name Arctotitan means "bear titan".

== Description ==
Arctotitan was an extremely large brontothere; the known premaxillomaxillary rostrum is about 20 centimeters long. Arctotitan must have been larger than almost all other brontotheres of the Early and Middle Eocene, rivaled in size only by the contemporary Gnathotitan from Inner Mongolia, and by the largest brontotheres of the Late Eocene.

The premaxillomaxillary rostrum of Arctotitan was broad and shallow. Because the upper surface of the rostrum of IVPP V.3201 is intact until above the first premolar, the nasal incision of Arctotitan must have extended to some point after the first pair of premolars.

Arctotitan had three pairs of incisors, which formed a slightly arched row. The incisors had a subcaniniform (similar to canines) shape, and progressed in size from the first to the last pair (i.e., the first pair of incisors were the smallest, and the third pair the largest). There were diastemas (gaps between teeth) between the incisors, and between the canines and premolars. The detailed morphology of the premolars of IVPP V.3201 is somewhat obscured by tooth wear. The third pair of premolars were nearly rectangular in shape.

== Classification ==
The subcaniniform incisors of Arctotitan are similar to the incisors of most hornless brontotheres. In a major 2008 monograph on brontotheres, Matthew C. Mihlbachler compared Arctotitan to various horned brontotheres (the brontothere subtribe Brontotheriina), the only brontothere group known to have reached sizes comparable to Arctotitan. The relatively primitive incisor morphology, and poorly developed hypocones on its premolars, distinguishes Arctotitan from many of the large horned brontotheres, such as Embolotherium and Protembolotherium. Several features of Arctotitan are similar to the primitive horned brontothere Rhinotitan, but it is overall not consistent with either of the known species of that genus; R. kaiseni had subcaniniform incisors, but a narrower and simpler first pair of premolars, and was of a much smaller overall size. R. andrewsi was larger than R. kaiseni, and had a first pair of premolars similar to those of Arctotitan, but more globular incisors. Gnathotitan was similar in size to Arctotitan, and had premolars in a similar size range. The upper incisors of Gnathotitan are unknown, and can thus not be compared to Arctotitan, but the lower incisors of Gnathotitan were subcaniniform and large, presumably consistent with Arctotitan.

Milhbachler (2008) deemed IVPP V.3201 to not preserve enough features that conclusively shows it to be a distinct taxon, and thus designated Arctotitan honghoensis as a nomen dubium. Mihlbachler also noted that Arctotitan could be a junior synonym of Gnathotitan berkeyi, though did designate it as such.

== Paleoecology ==
The Honghe Formation is dated to the Middle Eocene, mainly based on the only two other mammals known from the formation, cf. Deperetella and Breviodon. Bai et al. (2020) dated Arctotitan to the Irdinmanhan land mammal age. Magnetic and stratigraphic studies in 2018 indicate that the Honghe Formation began to be deposited around 45 million years ago. The paleoenvironment of the Honghe Formation was warm and humid, and consisted of tropical to subtropical evergreen broad-leaved and deciduous broad-leaved forests, as well as mixed deciduous broad-leaved and coniferous forests.
