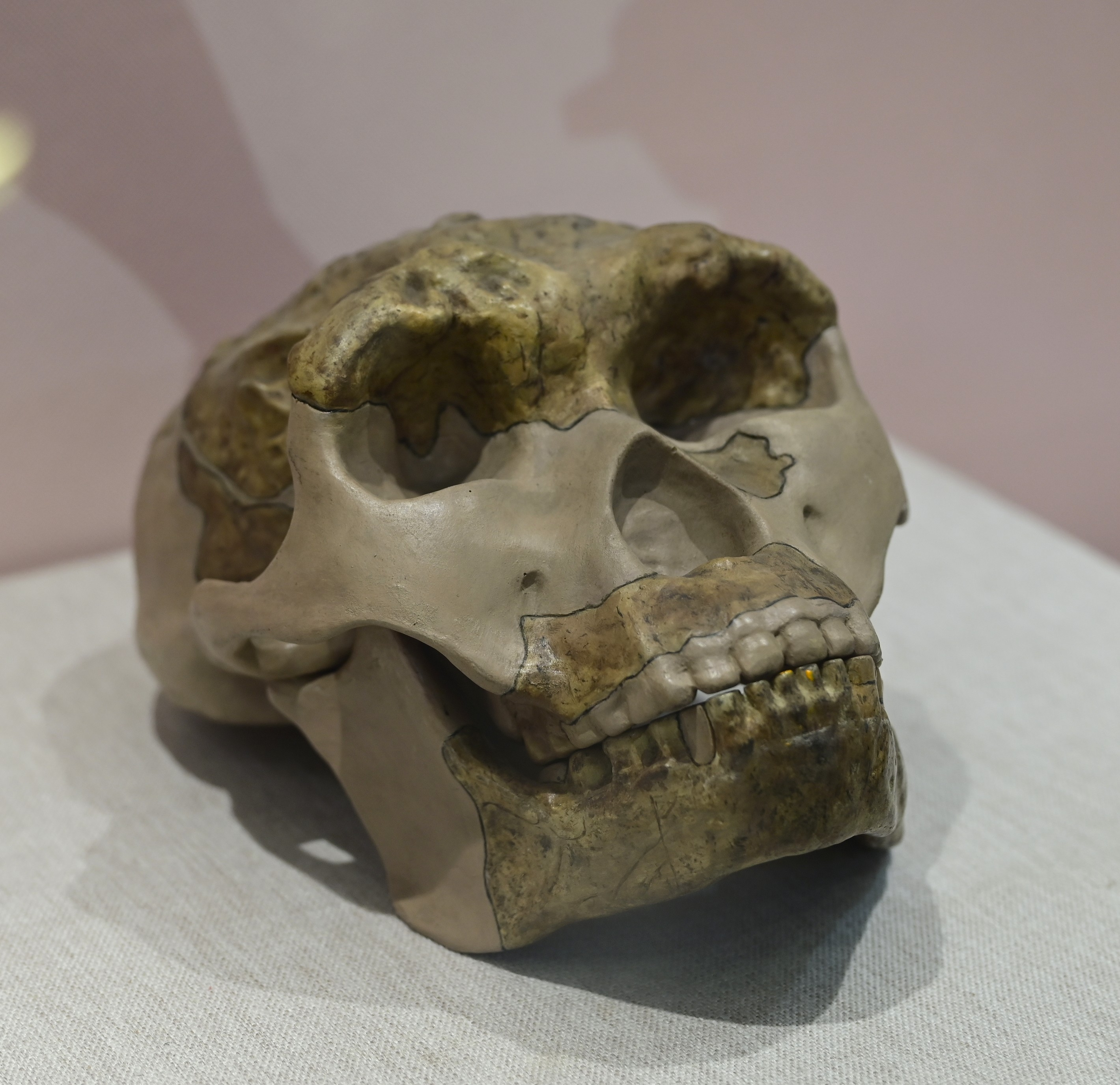
- Cast of Lantian Man at the Paleozoological Museum of China

Scientific classification
- Kingdom: Animalia
- Phylum: Chordata
- Class: Mammalia
- Order: Primates
- Superfamily: Hominoidea
- Family: Hominidae
- Genus: Homo
- Species: †H. erectus
- Subspecies: †H. e. lantianensis

Trinomial name
- †Homo erectus lantianensis (Woo Ju-Kang, 1964)

= Lantian Man =

Lantian Man Temporal range: Pleistocene

Subspecies of the genus Homo (fossil)

Lantian Man (simplified Chinese: 蓝田人; traditional Chinese: 藍田人; pinyin: Lántián rén), Homo erectus lantianensis) is a subspecies of Homo erectus known from an almost complete mandible from Chenchiawo (陈家窝) Village discovered in 1963, and a partial skull from Gongwangling (公王岭) Village discovered in 1964, situated in Lantian County on the Loess Plateau. The former dates to about 710–684 thousand years ago, and the latter 1.65–1.59 million years ago. This makes Lantian Man the second-oldest firmly dated H. erectus beyond Africa (after H. e. georgicus), and the oldest in East Asia. The fossils were first described by Woo Ju-Kan in 1964, who considered the subspecies an ancestor to Peking Man (H. e. pekinensis).

Like Peking Man, Lantian Man has a heavy brow ridge, a receding forehead, possibly a sagittal keel running across the midline of the skull, and exorbitantly thickened bone. The skull is small by absolute measure, and has narrower postorbital constriction. The teeth are proportionally large compared to other Asian H. erectus. The brain volume of the Gongwangling skull is about 780 cc, similar to contemporary archaic humans in Africa, but much smaller than later Asian H. erectus and modern humans.

Lantian Man inhabited the mild grasslands at the northern base of the Qinling Mountains. For stone tools, Lantian Man manufactured mainly heavy-duty tools including choppers, spheroids, heavy-duty scrapers, handaxes, picks, cleavers. The latter three are characteristic of the Acheulean industry, which is usually only applied to African and Western Eurasian sites. It appears the Acheulean persisted far longer in this region than elsewhere.

== Taxonomy ==
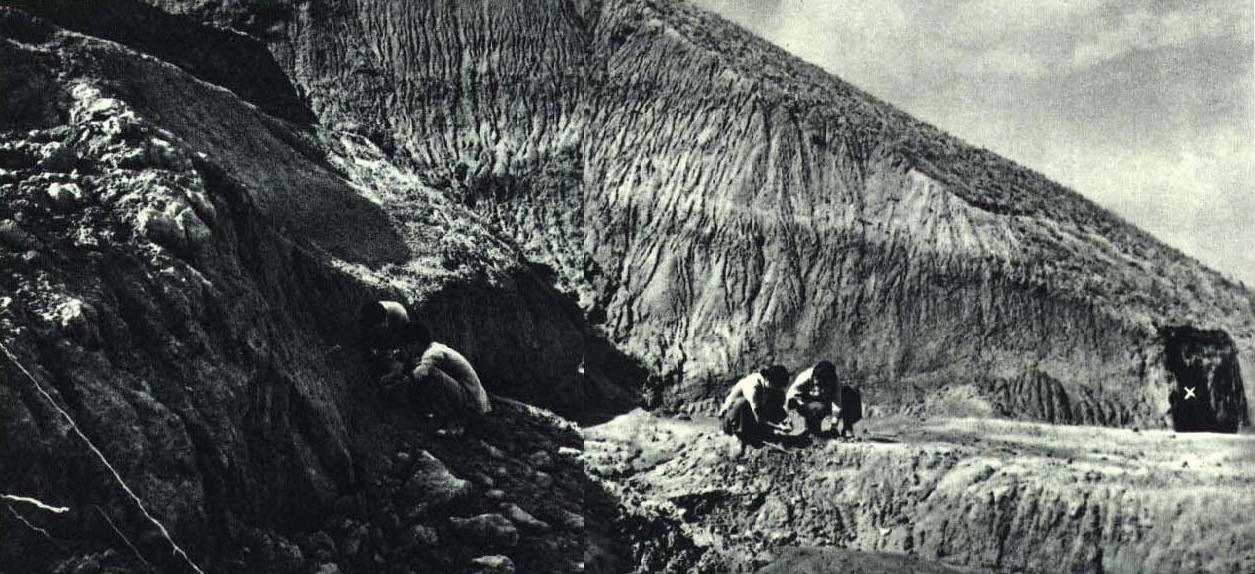
Excavation of Lantian Man

On July 19, 1963, a team funded by the Chinese Institute of Vertebrate Palaeontology and Palaeoanthropology (IVPP) recovered a fossil human mandible (lower jawbone) outside Chenchiawo Village, Lantian County in the Shaanxi Province of Northwest China. It was found in the bottom end of a 30 m (98 ft) thick layer of reddish clays, atop a metre-thick (3 ft) layer of gravel. Lantian is situated on the Loess Plateau, which is geologically stratified into alternating units of loess (wind-blown sediment deposits) and paleosol (soil deposits). The mandible was formally described by Chinese palaeoanthropologist Woo Ju-Kan (吴汝康) in 1964, who noted its similarity to the Peking Man (at the time "Sinanthropus" pekinensis), and provisionally classified it as "Sinanthropus" lantianensis. This spurred further investigation of Lantian County, which recovered a human tooth by the end of the May 1964 and the rest of the skull by October, at the Gongwangling site at the foothills of the Qinling Mountains. Woo also assigned it to "S." lantianensis, but later that year, he recognised the genus was falling out of favour and was being synonymised with Homo erectus. He recommended the combination Homo erectus lantianensis. Nonetheless, the skull is too distorted to morphologically assess Lantian Man's relationship with other H. erectus populations, so it is unclear if Lantian Man and Peking Man are more closely related to each other than Java Man (H. e. erectus).

The discovery of Lantian Man was in the midst of an ever-increasing number of Chinese fossil ape sites, bringing the country to the forefront of anthropological discussions, beyond the capital's famous Peking Man. These were publicised in local site museums constructed in the 1980's and 1990's; Lantian Man became one such spectacle for the Shaanxi History Museum.

Lantian Man was early on recognised as being older than Peking Man on purely morphological grounds. In 1973, American anthropologists Jean Aigner and William S. Laughlin suggested the Chenchiawo site was deposited 300,000 years ago and the Gongwangling site 700,000 years ago based on the animal remains (biostratigraphy), constrained to the Middle Pleistocene. In 1978, Chinese palaeoanthropologist Ma Xinghua and colleagues estimated, respectively, 650,000 and 750 to 800 thousand years ago using palaeomagnetism, extending into the Early Pleistocene. Using the same methods later that year, Chinese palaeoanthropologist Cheng Gouliang and colleagues instead reported 500,000 and 1 million years ago. In 1984, Chinese palaeoanthropologists Liu Dongsheng and Ding Menglin suggested the layers date to 500 to 690 thousand and 730 to 800 thousand years ago. In 1989, Chinese palaeoanthropologists An Zhisheng and Ho Chuan Kun stratigraphically placed the Chenchiawo at Palaeosol Unit 5 and the Gongwangling skull to Loess Unit 15, and palaeomagnetically dated them to 650,000 and 1.15 million years ago. This made Lantian Man the oldest firmly dated Asian human species at the time.

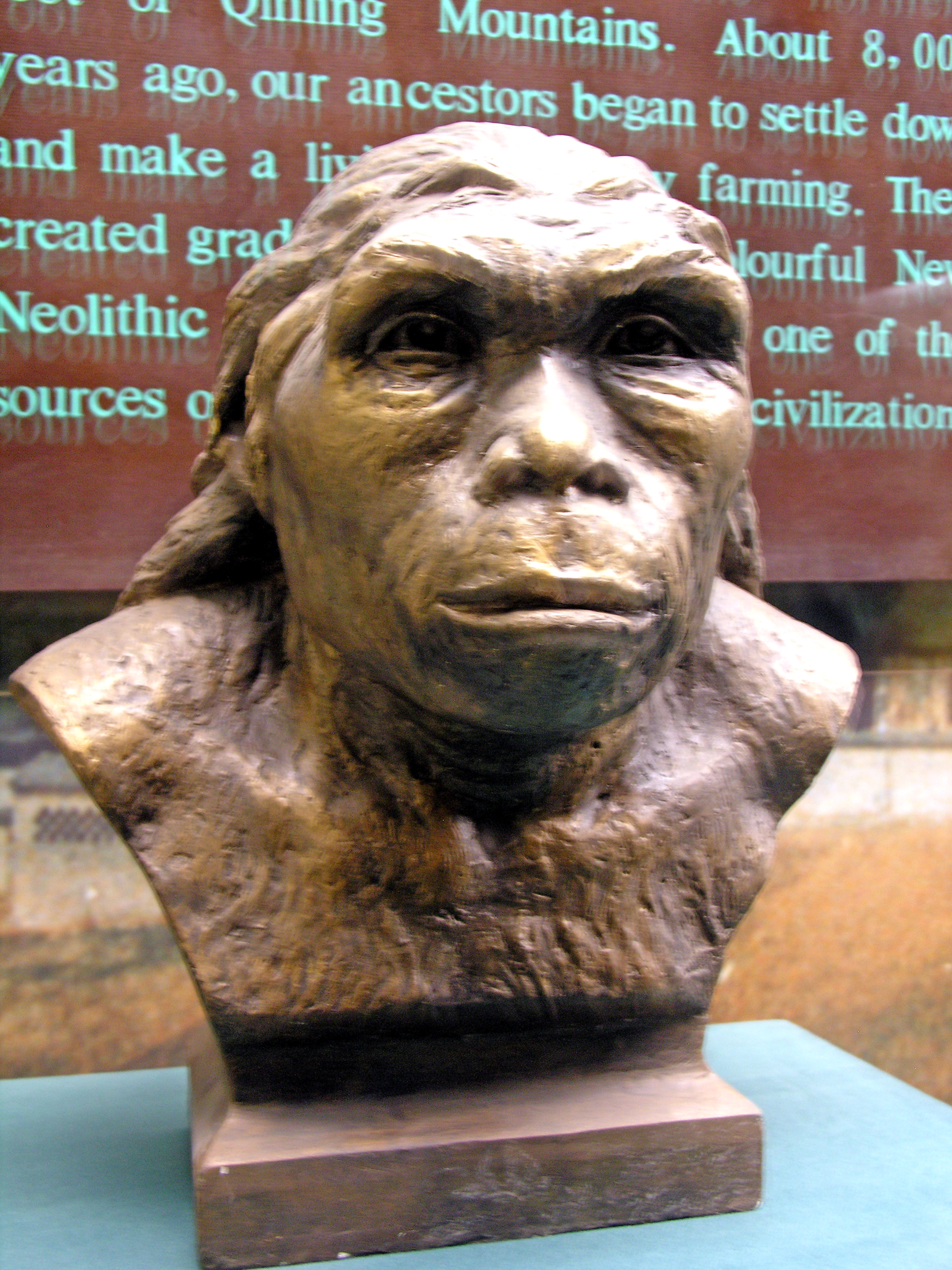
Reconstruction of Lantian Man

An and Ho's dates became widely used, but in 2015, Chinese palaeoanthropologist Zhu-Yu Zhu and colleagues noticed a discontinuity in the stratigraphy, which put the Chenchiawo mandible in Palaeosol Unit 6, and the Gongwangling skull all the way down in Palaeosol Unit 23. This makes them 1.65–1.59 million and 710–684 thousand years old. Lantian Man is then roughly contemporaneous with the earliest humans to leave Africa: the 1.75 million year old Dmanisi humans (H. e. georgicus), the 1.6–1.5 million year old Sangiran humans (H. e. erectus), and the 1.7–1.4 million year old Yuanmou Man (H. e. yuanmouensis). In 2018, Zhu reported 2.1 million year old stone tools at the Shangchen site in Lantian. Such early dates indicate H. erectus rapidly dispersed across the Old World once out of Africa. In 2011, Indonesian palaeoanthropologist Yahdi Zaim and colleagues suggested the open habitats of China and Southeast Asia were colonised by two distinct waves of H. erectus based on dental anatomy, separated by a rainforest belt south of the Qinling Mountains.

== Anatomy ==
The Gongwangling skull is relatively complete, and comprises the frontal bone (forehead), most of the parietal bones (top of the head), the right temporal bone (sides of the head), the bottom margins of the nasal bones (between the eyes), and pieces of the maxillae (upper jaws). It is a bit distorted, with the right orbit jutting out farther than the left, several elements are slightly flattened, the depressions and the middle of the frontal bone are craggy due to corrosion, and the left parietal flexes out a bit more than normal. Based on the size and wearing of the molars (and assuming they degrade faster than those of modern humans), Woo estimated the individual was a 30 year old female. Overall, the skull is quite archaic, according to Woo reminiscent of the contemporary Mojokerto skull from Java. Woo calculated a brain volume of about 780 cc, which is quite small for H. erectus. For comparison, later Asian H. erectus average roughly 1,000 cc, and present-day modern humans 1,270 cc for males and 1,130 cc for females. Contemporary African archaic humans (H. habilis, H. rudolfensis, and H. e? ergaster) ranged from 500–900 cc.

Like Peking Man, the brow ridge is a solid, continuous bar; the forehead is low and receding; and there may have been a sagittal keel running across the midline, but the region is too eroded to definitively tell. The two hard layers of bone (separated by spongy diploë) in the skull are extraordinarily thickened. The temporal lines arcing across the parietals are ridges. Unlike Peking Man, the brow projects more at the midpoint and does not terminate in a sulcus (a defined dip), instead extending even farther. Lantian Man also has greater post-orbital constriction. The nasal bones are rather wide. The orbits are rectangular and lack the supraorbital foramen and the lacrimal fossa. The upper second molar is longer and narrower than the third. Woo reconstructed the skull's length x breadth as 189 mm × 149 mm (7.4 in × 5.9 in), much smaller than the adult dimensions of Peking Man or Java Man.

The Chenchiawo mandible was the most complete mandible from Pleistocene of China at the time, preserving most elements except for pieces of the rami (the ascending portion which connects with the skull). Woo considered the specimen an elderly female based on size and wearing of the teeth. The mandible is mostly consistent with that of Peking Man, except the rami ascend at a smaller angle, the mental foramen is placed lower, the rows of molar teeth have significantly larger angles, and the teeth are larger than what would be expected for a female.

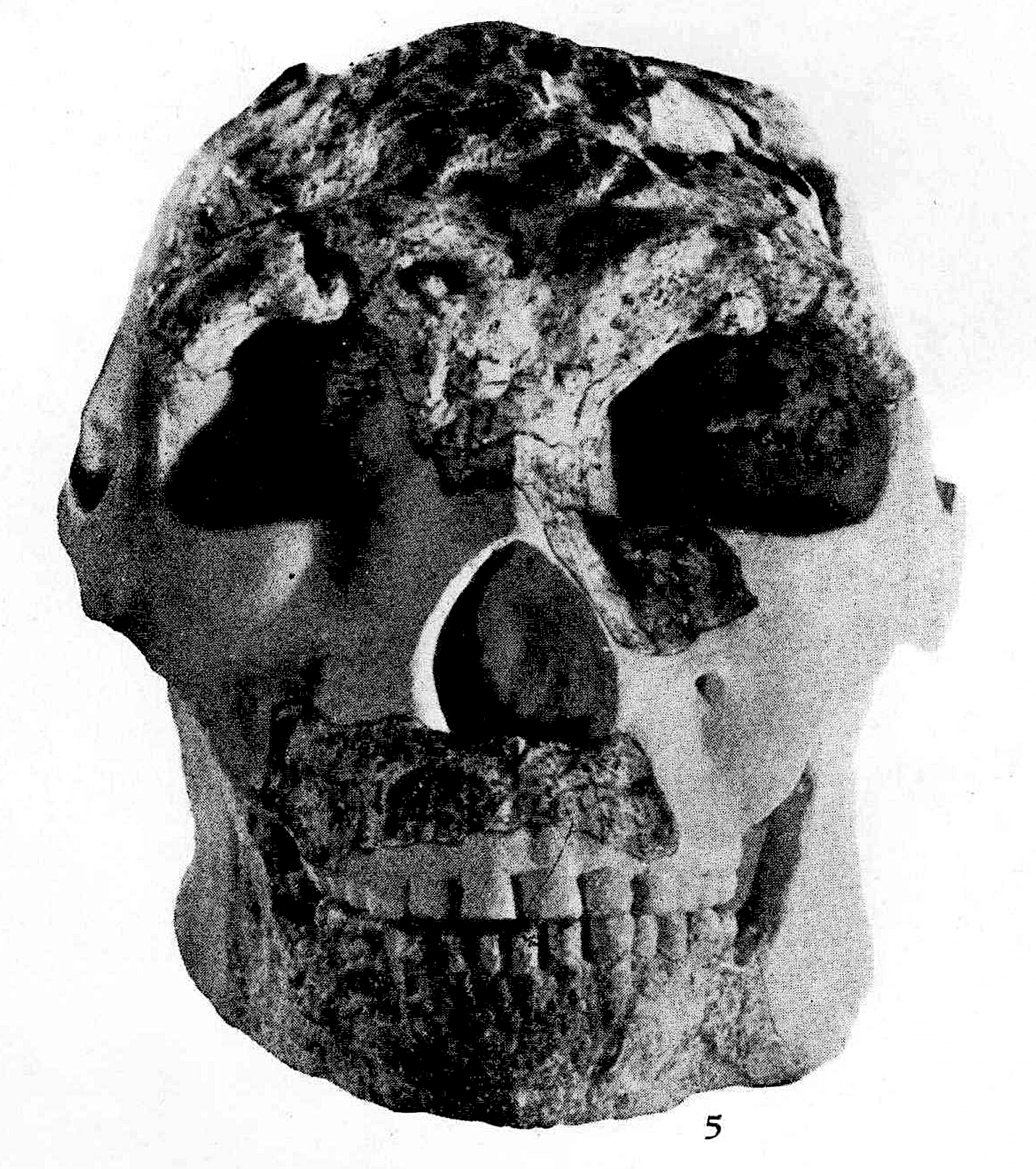
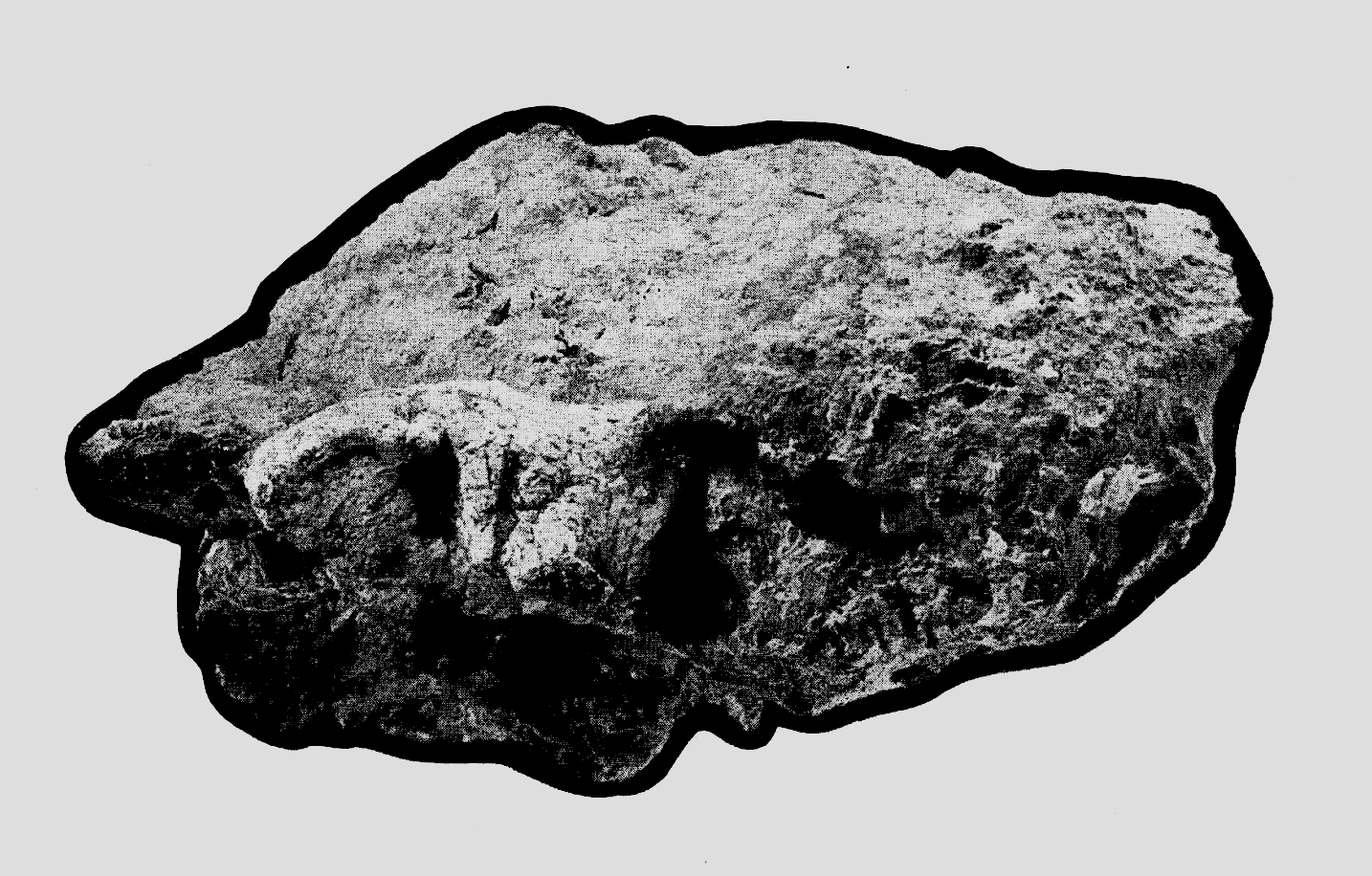
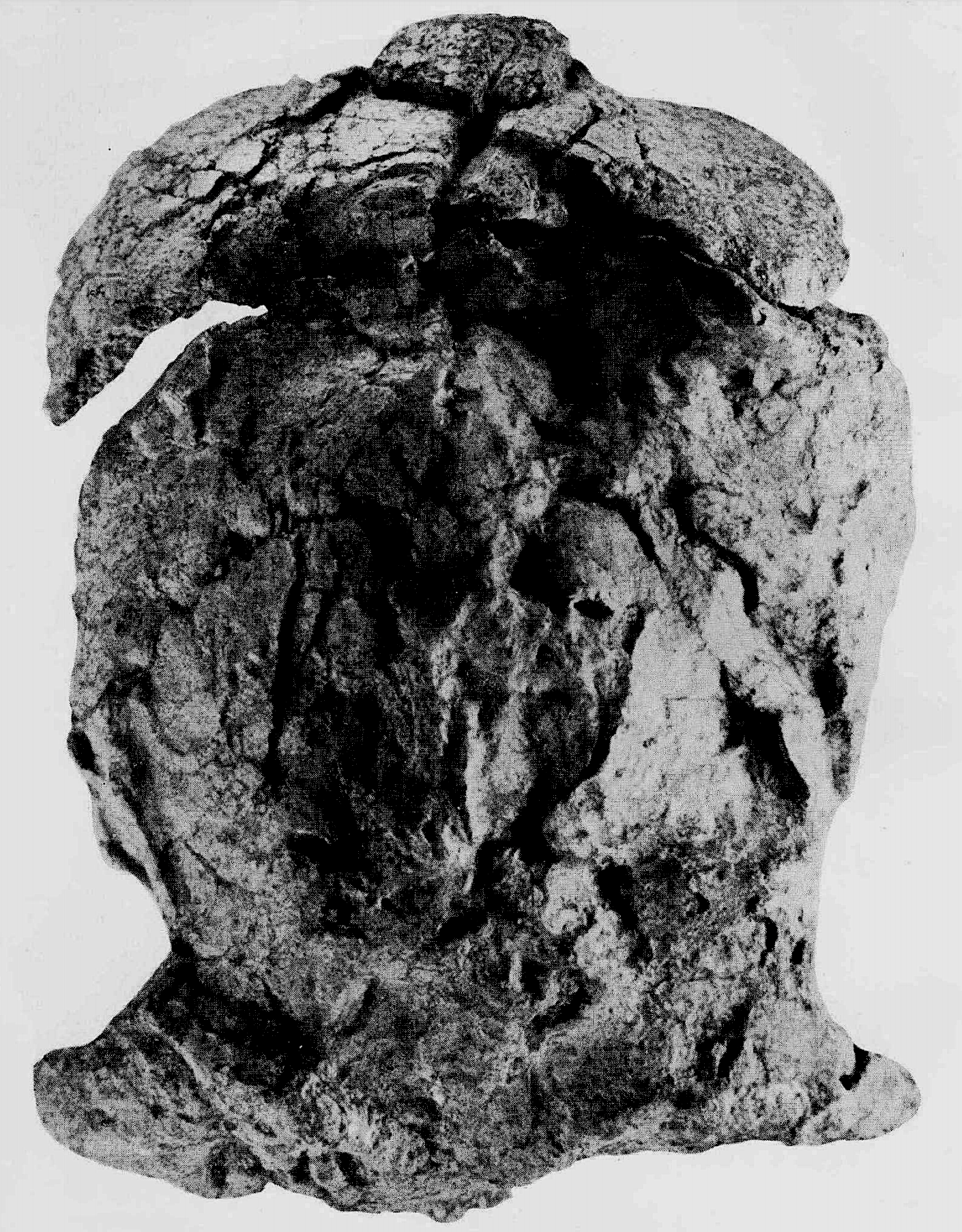
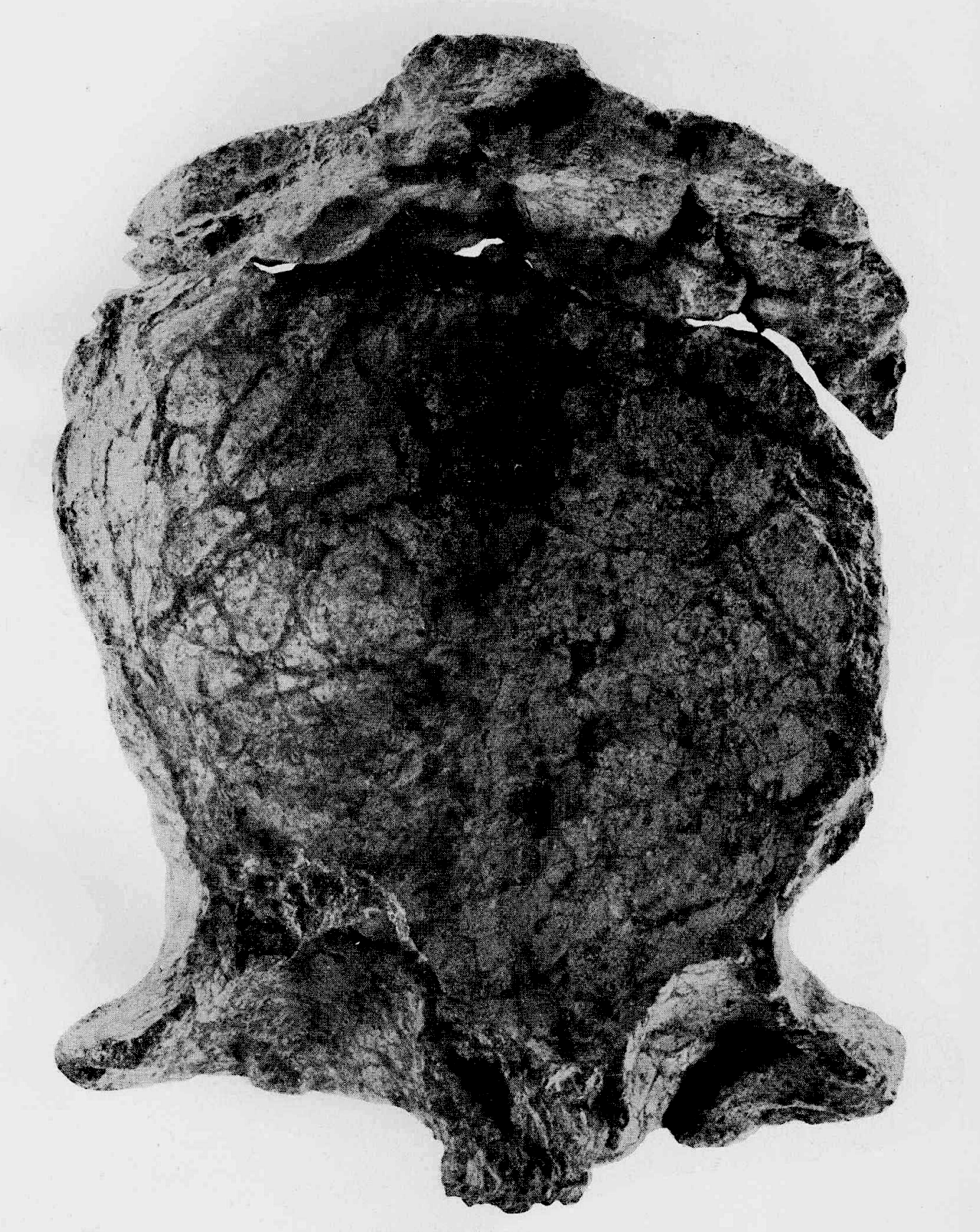
From left to right, facial reconstruction of Lantian Man by Woo Ju-Kan, and the Gongwangling skull from the left, top, and bottom

=== Pathology ===
The Chenchiawo mandible is missing the third molars, probably a genetic disorder, the first such case for an extinct human species. The right cheek teeth, especially the first molar, feature deterioration and abnormal thickening, which are indicators of gum disease. The first premolar was also lost, probably as a result of this. Nonetheless, none of the teeth developed cavities.

== Culture ==
=== Palaeoenvironment ===
The Loess Plateau is a fossil-rich area; the mammal assemblage indicates it has broadly remained a mild grassland throughout the Pleistocene. Gongwangling sits at the base of the Qinling Mountains, which today is a natural barrier separating northern and southern China, forming plains to the north and forest to the south, but at the time may not have posed such an insurmountable wall. Consequently, among the 41 other mammalian species unearthed, Gongwangling also comprises several fauna typical of South China: the giant panda, the elephant Stegodon orientalis, the tapir Tapirus sinensis, the giant tapir, the chalicothere Nestoritherium sinensis, the tufted deer, the mainland serow, and the snub-nosed monkey. Other forest-going creatures (not typical of the south) are: the Etruscan bear, the pig Sus lydekker, and the deer Cervus grayi and Sinomegaceros konwanlinensis. More common were grassland and open-habitat creatures including: badgers, the giant hyena Pachycrocuta, the Zhoukoudian wolf, the tiger, the leopard, the cheetah-like Sivapanthera, the saber-toothed Megantereon, the horse Equus sanmemiensis, the rhino Dicerorhinus, the bovid Leptobos, and several northerly rodents. This assemblage indicates a mild and semi-humid climate, featuring plains adjacent to forest mountains. Chenchiawo features the dhole, the Asian badger, the tiger, the Asian elephant, S. lydekkeri, Sinomegaceros, and C. grayi, in addition to seven species of northerly rodents, which are consistent with a warm, semi-humid to semi-arid grassland to bushland environment.

=== Technology ===
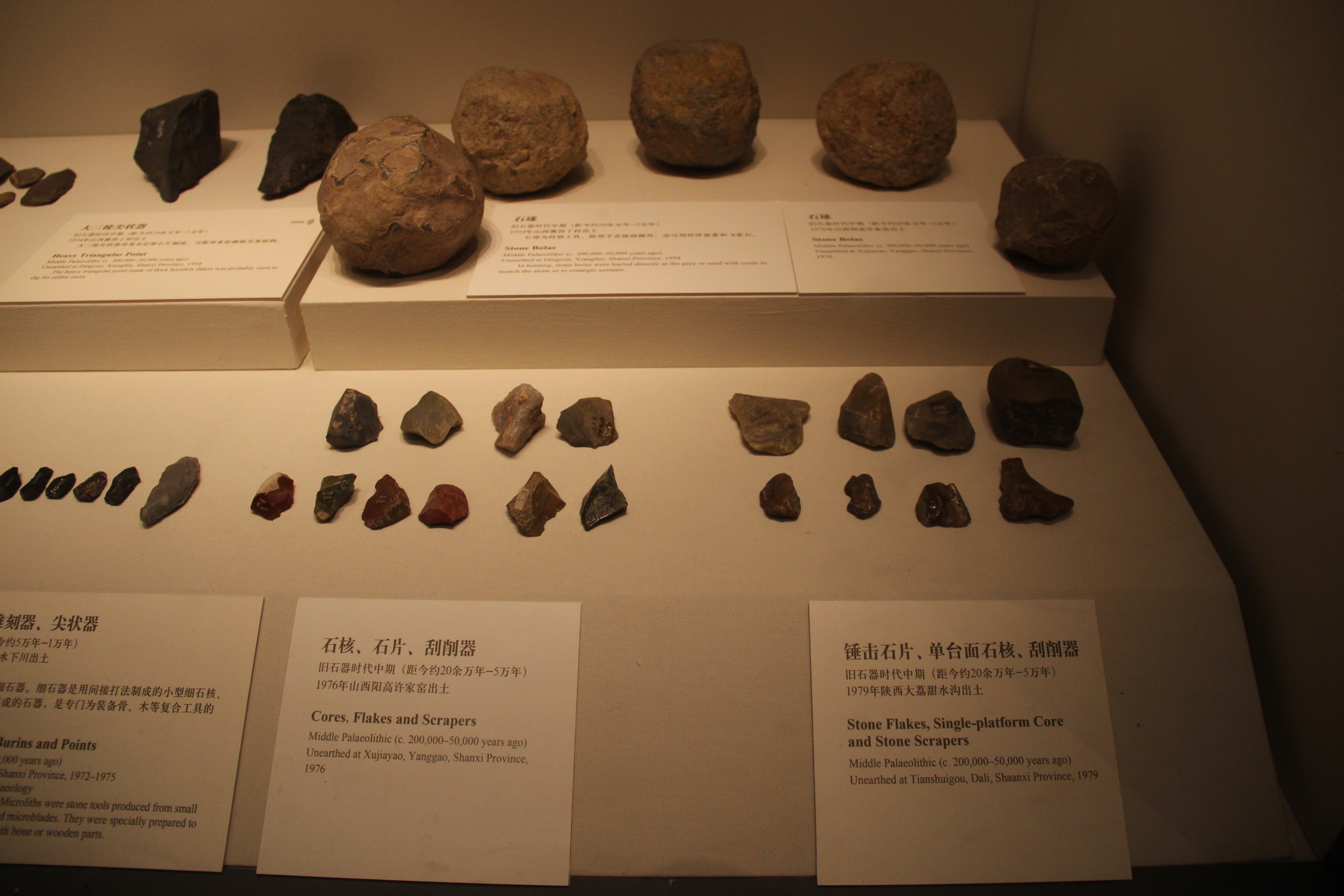
Stone tools from the Middle Palaeolithic of Shaanxi

The stone tool technology of China was long thought to be so distinct from contemporary western sites that they were incomparable, the former characterised as a simple chopper industry, and the latter as a handaxe industry (the Acheulean). In 1944, American archaeologist Hallam L. Movius drew the "Movius Line" partitioning west from east. As Chinese archaeology progressed through the 1980s, characteristically Acheulean tools were uncovered in China (including Lantian), and the strict Movius Line fell apart.

As of 2014, total of 27 stone tool bearing sites from the Early to Middle Pleistocene have been discovered within the vicinity of Chenchiawo and Gongwangling, in addition to two Late Pleistocene sites. In 2018, Zhu and colleagues reported 2.1 million year old stone tools at the Shangchen site on the Loess Plateau, the oldest evidence of humans out of Africa. Only 26 stone tools were excavated at Gongwangling, 20 from adjacent sites, and 10 from Chenchiawo. In total, the Early to Middle Pleistocene assemblage comprise largely heavy-duty tools including choppers, handaxes, picks, cleavers, spheroids, and heavy-duty scrapers made of predominantly local river cobble — quartzite, quartz, greywacke, and igneous pebbles — and more rarely higher quality sandstone, limestone, and chert. Handaxes, cleavers, and picks are characteristic of the Acheulean, which seems to have prevailed for some time in this region even while the west was transitioning to the Middle Stone Age/Middle Paleolithic in the Late Pleistocene. They seem to have preferred the bipolar percussion technique (smashing the core into several flakes with a hammerstone, out of which at least a few should be the correct size and shape), and less frequently used the anvil-chipping technique (hitting the core against an anvil to slowly chip away pieces into a usable edge).

== See also ==
- Shangchen
- Nanjing Man
