= List of Paleolithic sites in China =

Map of China showing sites of Paleolithic China (clickable map)

This is a list of Paleolithic sites in China. They are sorted in chronological order from dated earliest (Note: I.e. the earliest date an object found at the site has been dated to) to latest:

== List ==
English name	Chinese name	Time	Modern-day location
Xihoudu	西侯渡	2.43 MYA	Shanxi
Shangchen	上陈（上陳）	2.12 MYA – 1.26 MYA	Lantian County, Shaanxi
Bose Basin	博斯盆地		Guangxi of southern China
He County	和县（和縣）		Anhui
Yuanmou County	元谋县		Yunnan
Xiaochangliang	小长梁（小長梁）		Nihewan Basin in Yangyuan County, Hebei
Zhoukoudian	周口店	0.7 MYA – 0.2 MYA	Beijing
Yuchanyan Cave	玉蟾岩遗址		Dao County, Hunan
Xianren Cave	仙人洞		Dayuan Village, Wannian County, Jiangxi
Damaidi	大麦地（大麥地）		Small village in Zhongwei, Ningxia, set amid the Weining Mountains on the north bend of the Yellow River
Guanyindong	黔西观音洞遗址		Qianxi in the Chinese Province of Guizhou.

== See also ==
- History of China
- Prehistory of China
- List of Bronze Age sites in China
- List of Neolithic cultures of China
- List of inventions and discoveries of Neolithic China
