= Paramynodon =

Paramynodon Temporal range: Middle Eocene (Sharamurunian), c. 40 Ma
- Jaws of P. birmanicus (GSI No. C344, the former type specimen of P. cotteri)

Scientific classification
- Kingdom: Animalia
- Phylum: Chordata
- Class: Mammalia
- Order: Perissodactyla
- Superfamily: Rhinocerotoidea
- Family: †Amynodontidae
- Tribe: †Metamynodontini
- Genus: †Paramynodon; Matthew, 1929
- Species: †P. birmanicus

Binomial name
- †Paramynodon birmanicus (Pilgrim & Cotter, 1916) [originally Metamynodon]

Synonyms
- Metamynodon birmanicus Pilgrim & Cotter, 1916; Metamynodon cotteri Pilgrim, 1925; Paramynodon cotteri (Pilgrim, 1925)

Extinct genus of mammals

Paramynodon ("beside Amynodon") is an extinct genus of amynodont that lived in Southeast Asia during the Middle Eocene, in the Sharamurunian land mammal age. The genus contains a single species, P. birmanicus, known from fossils found in the Pondaung Formation of Myanmar. Fossils from the Lumeiyi and Naduo formations of southern China have also tentatively been referred to Paramynodon.

Paramynodon was a medium-sized amynodont, with an estimated body mass of 1,181–1,247 kilograms (2,604–2,749 lb). Fossils of Paramynodon were originally referred to the North American genus Metamynodon, but were reassessed as intermediate between Metamynodon and the more primitive Amynodon in 1929. Paramynodon had a robust skull and large canines, though neither of these traits were as developed as they are in Metamynodon. The preorbital (in front of the eyes) part of the skull of Paramynodon was also relatively long compared to that of Metamynodon. A second species of Paramynodon was formerly recognized, P. cotteri, distinguished by larger size and relatively larger canines; these differences are now attributed to individual variation, perhaps sexual dimorphism.

== Research history ==
Type specimen of P. birmanicus (GSI No. C316)

Lower jaw (top) and palate (bottom) of GSI No. C344

Metamynodon birmanicus was described by Guy Ellcock Pilgrim and George de P. Cotter in 1916, based on fossils found in the Pondaung Formation of Myanmar. Much of the original fossil material was fragmentary, consisting largely of isolated teeth. The best preserved of Pilgrim and Cotter's specimens, a lower jaw with five worn teeth (GSI No. C316), was selected as the type specimen. Pilgrim and Cotter noted that referral of the fossils to Metamynodon was provisional due to their fragmentary nature, and that more complete fossils were needed to clarify whether a new genus may instead be justified. The naming of a new species, regardless of what genus it correctly belonged to, was justified through differences between the dentition of the Pondaung fossils and the type species of Metamynodon, M. planifrons. Pilgrim and Cotter interpreted M. birmanicus as an amynodont more primitive than M. planifrons, but more derived and specialized in its direction than the even more primitive Amynodon. In addition to the type specimen, additional fossils (isolated teeth) were also described and selected as paratypes.

In 1925, Pilgrim named another species of Metamynodon based on fossils found in the Pondaung Formation, M. cotteri. The new species was based on the specimen GSI No. C344, which includes a near-complete mandible, and much of the upper jaw. As with M. birmanicus, Pilgrim considered M. cotteri to be intermediate between Amynodon and Metamynodon. Pilgrim distinguished M. cotteri from M. birmanicus by its larger size, relatively larger canines, and the lower canines having an elliptical cross section (in contrast to a trihedral cross section in P. birmanicus). Pilgrim also referred additional fossils to M. birmanicus, including two fossils preserving more of the upper dentition (GSI No. C345 and 346).

In 1929, William Diller Matthew named the new genus Paramynodon to contain M. birmanicus and M. cotteri, having found the Pondaung metamynodont fossils "to be nearer to Amynodon than to Metamynodon" and to also represent a new "partly intermediate, partly aberrant genus". Matthew described Paramynodon as intermediate between Amynodon and Metamynodon in many characteristics and proportions, noting in particular that it was for instance distinguished from Amynodon by its more hypsodont (higher-crowned) teeth and broader skull, but that its skull was not as broad as that of Metamynodon.

In 1938, Edwin H. Colbert described a large number of additional Paramynodon fossils from the Pondaung Formation, including postcranial material, and revised the diagnoses of both the genus and the two species. Matthew had not designated a type species for Paramynodon. Colbert selected P. birmanicus as the type species; although P. cotteri was based on a more complete type specimen, the teeth of the P. birmanicus type are significantly less worn, and thus more useful in establishing diagnostic characters. Colbert doubted the validity of P. cotteri as a distinct species, noting that size differences could be due to individual variation, and that the supposed differences between the lower canines of the two species may not be as significant as Pilgrim believed them to be, if they existed at all, since it mostly depended on how the canines are observed. Colbert found it possible that differences in the size of the canines of the two species could be due to sexual dimorphism. Colbert provisionally maintained P. cotteri as valid since little comparison was possible between the type specimens of the two species, but believed future research would indicate them as synonymous.

Fossils that may belong to Paramynodon have since also been found in the Lumeiyi Formation of Lunan, Yunnan and Naduo Formation of Guangxi, both in southern China. In 1989, William P. Wall published another revised diagnosis of Paramynodon as a genus, and agreed with Colbert that P. cotteri is a junior synonym of P. birmanicus, attributing the perceived differences to individual variation and sexual dimorphism. Later studies on amynodonts have continued to recognize P. cotteri as a synonym of P. birmanicus.

== Description ==
Reconstruction of the skull and mandible of P. birmanicus

Paramynodon was intermediate in size between Amynodon and Metamynodon. The body mass of the largest fossil specimens, formerly assigned to P. cotteri, has been estimated at 1,181–1,247 kilograms (2,604–2,749 lb).

The skull of Paramynodon was comparatively long. In particular, the preorbital (in front of the eyes) portion of the skull was relatively long, and there was also a relatively long postcanine diastema (gap between the canines and premolars). The zygomatic arches were expanded and thick, and bowed outwards. Per Colbert (1938), the zygomatic arches were broadly expanded to a greater relative degree in Paramynodon than in any other amynodont. The orbits (eye sockets) were placed above the first pair of molars, and relatively high up on the skull. There was a relatively low sagittal crest.

The dental formula of Paramynodon has been given as 3.1.3.32?.1.2.3 or 3.1.3.33?.1.2.3. It is not clear whether the incisors were reduced in number or not, but they were short and stubby. The canines were quite large, and were described by Colbert (1938) as "wholly tagassuoid" (similar to the canines of peccaries). The premolars were considerably reduced, and the lower molars were quite narrow.

== Classification ==
The first attempt to establish amynodont interrelationships was conducted by Miklós Kretzoi in 1942. Kretzoi classified Paramynodon as the sole genus in the subfamily "Paramynodontinae", which he characterized as medium-sized animals, with moderately specialized cheek teeth and with long, primitive faces (i.e. the preorbital part of the skull). In 1954, Vera Gromova rejected Kretzoi's approach and did not recognize any amynodont subgroups. Wall (1989) was the first to perform a phylogenetic analysis on the amynodonts, and classified Paramynodon in the amynodont tribe Metamynodontini. Later phylogenetic analyses have continued to consistently recover Paramynodon in Metamynodontini.

Wall considered the relationship between Paramynodon and the North American genus Megalamynodon to be "uncertain", "because of their primitive character states". Wall believed it was possible that the two belonged to the same genus, in which case Megalamynodon would become a junior synonym of Paramynodon. Per Wall, Paramynodon is distinguished from Megalamynodon only by its reduced third premolar, and an enlarged glenoid shelf. Subsequent authors have all maintained Megalamynodon and Paramynodon as two distinct genera. The relationship between the two genera has varied slightly between analyses. In 2017, Averianov et al. recovered Megalamynodon, Paramynodon, and Metamynodon in a polytomy, whereas Tissier et al. (2018) recovered Megalamynodon as more derived than Paramynodon, as the sister taxon of a clade formed by Metamynodon and Sellamynodon. In 2023, Veine-Tonizzo et al. recovered Paramynodon and Megalamynodon in a clade within Metamynodontini. The Paramynodon + Megalamynodon clade was supported by two synapomorphies: the second and third incisor being of similar size, and the zygomatic process progressively diverging from the maxilla. The cladogram below presents the results of Veine-Tonizzo et al. (2023):

- Amynodontidae
  - Rostriamynodon grangeri
  - - Amynodon advenus
    - - Sharamynodon mongoliensis
      - - Metamynodontini
          - - Paramynodon birmanicus
            - Megalamynodon regalis
          - - Sellamynodon zimborensis
            - Metamynodon planifrons
        - Cadurcodontini
          - - Zaisanamynodon protheroi
            - Zaisanamynodon borisovi
          - - - - Amynodontopsis bodei
                - Amynodontopsis jiyuanensis
              - - Cadurcotherium cayluxi
                - Cadurcotherium minus
            - - Cadurcodon bahoensis
              - - Cadurcodon maomingensis
                - - Cadurcodon ardynensis
                  - Cadurcodon kazakademius

== Paleoecology ==
The Pondaung Formation has been dated to the late Middle Eocene, c. 40 million years ago. The upper part of the Lumeiyi Formation, from which fossils have also been referred to Paramynodon, may be coeval in age with the Pondaung Formation. The paleoenvironment of the Pondaung Formation was an inland terrestrial environment on a deltaic plain, with several river channels. Local environments included open-forested seasonal wetlands, and littoral to riparian forests. The presence of primates such as Kyitchaungia (1.6–1.8 kg) suggest that at least parts of the forests were dense enough to allow for their arboreal lifestyle.

The Pondaung fauna is most well known for abundant fossils of anthracotheres, and for several enigmatic primates. The anthacotheres have been subject to several revisions, and are currently considered to be represented by five genera: Anthracohyus, Anthracotherium, Anthracokeryx, Myaingtherium, and Siamotherium. Primates were represented by several groups, including amphipithecids, adapiforms, eosimiiforms, eosimiids, and tarsiids. In addition to anthracotheres, other large mammals included brontotheres, tapiroids, ruminants, and chalicotherioids.

The upper part of the Lumeiyi Formation also preserves fossils from a diverse mammal fauna. Other perissodactyls included several other amynodonts, brontotheres, hyracodonts, tapiroids, and paraceratheres. Artiodactyls were represented by both anthracotheres and entelodonts. Carnivorous mammals included both hyaenodonts (Orienspterodon) and carnivorans (Chailicyon). The Naduo Formation also preserves a diverse fauna of mammals, including the fellow amynodonts Caenolophus and Huananodon, the rhinoceros Guixia, brontotheres, chalicotherioids, tapirioids, as well as bears, amphicyonids, amphicynodontids, hyaenodonts (Propterodon), mesonychids (Guilestes, Harpagolestes), entelodonts, peccaries, suids, ruminants, and several anthracotheres.
