= Gongkang Formation =

Geologic formation in Guangxi, China

- Stratigraphic range: Middle/Late Eocene or Early Oligocene
- Type: Formation
- Overlies: Naduo Formation

Location
- Region: Guangxi
- Country: China

The Gongkang Formation is a geologic formation in Guangxi, southern China. Different dates have been proposed for the Gongkang Formation historically, typically middle or late Eocene. The fossil gastropod fauna found in the formation may indicate an Early Oligocene age.

== Mammal fossils ==
=== Artiodactyla ===
Genus/family	Species	Notes/affinities	Images
Anthracokeryx	A. gungkangensis	An anthracothere.	
Anthracokeryx	A. kwangsiensis	An anthracothere.	
Anthracokeryx	A. sp.	An anthracothere.	
Bothriodon?	B.? tientongensis	An anthracothere.	
Eopecarihyus	E. sp. nov.	A peccary.	
Heothema	H. angusticalxia	An anthracothere.	
Heothema	H. chengbiensis	An anthracothere.	
Heothema	H. media	An anthracothere.	

=== Carnivora ===
Genus/family	Species	Notes/affinities	Images
Hoplophoneus?	H. sp.	A nimravid (false saber-toothed cat).	
Machairodontinae gen. nov.	sp. nov.	A machairodontine (saber-toothed cat).	
Orientictis	O. spanios	A viverravid.	

=== Perissodactyla ===
Genus/family	Species	Notes/affinities	Images
Guixia	G. youjiangensis	A rhinoceros.	
Forstercooperia	F. sp. nov.	A paracerathere.	
Huananodon	H. hypsodonta	An amynodont.	
Schizotherium	S. nabanensis	A chalicothere.	
Schizotherium	S. sp.	A chalicothere.	

=== Primates ===
Genus/family	Species	Notes/affinities	Images
Guangxilemur	G. tongi	A sivaladapid.	
