= Yuchanyan =

Cave and archaeological site in China

- Location in China
- 25°36′24″N 111°28′58″E
- Periods: Paleolithic China
- Location: Hunan
- Region: Southern China

History
- Built: 21,000 BP
- Abandoned: 13,800 BP

Site notes
- Material: limestone Karst
- Height: 5 m (16 ft)
- Length: 6 to 8 m (20 to 26 ft)
- Width: 12 to 15 m (39 to 49 ft)
- Area: 46 m^{2} (495 sq ft)

Yuchanyan is an early Neolithic cave site in Dao County (Daoxian), Hunan, China. The site yielded sherds of ceramic vessels and other artifacts which were dated by analysis of charcoal and bone collagen, giving a date range of 17,500 to 18,300 years old for the pottery. The pottery specimens may be the oldest known examples of pottery.

The cave yielded fragmentary remains of 2 or more ceramic vessels, in addition to large amounts of ash, a rich animal bone assemblage, cobble and flake artifacts, bone tools, and shell tools. The artifacts indicate that the cave was a Late Paleolithic foragers' camp. Here we report on the radiocarbon ages of the sediments based on analyses of charcoal and bone collagen. The best-preserved charcoal and bone samples were identified by prescreening in the field and laboratory. The dates range from around 21,000 to 13,800 cal BP. The age of the ancient pottery ranges between 18,300 and 15,430 cal BP. Charcoal and bone collagen samples located above and below one of the fragments produced dates of around 18,000. These ceramic potsherds therefore provide some of the earliest evidence for pottery making in China.
