= Shangchen =

Archaeological site in Shaanxi, China

- 上陈 (Chinese)
- Location within China
- 34°13′07″N 109°29′08″E
- Periods: Palaeolithic China
- Location: Shangchen village, Lantian County
- Region: Shaanxi

History
- Built: Possibly as early as 2.12 million years ago
- Abandoned: 1.26 million years ago

Site notes
- Excavation dates: 2004–2017
- Archaeologists: Zhu Zhaoyu, Robin Dennell

Shangchen (Chinese: 上陈) is a Lower Palaeolithic archaeological site in Lantian County, Shaanxi, China, some 25 km south of Weinan. It was discovered in 1964, and excavated during 2004 and 2017.

Stone tools found at the site were dated based on magnetostratigraphy in a 2018 study. Possible artefacts were found in 17 layers, tentatively dated by their discoverers to between 1.26 Ma (palaeosol S15) and 2.12 Ma (loess L28). The date of 2.12 Ma predates the earliest known fossils of archaic humans in Eurasia (Homo erectus georgicus) by 300,000 years. Whether these potential tools were made by an early species in the genus Homo or another hominin species is unknown.

== Location ==
Shangchen is located in and named after the village of Shangchen (上陈村), Yushan Town (zh), Lantian County, Shaanxi, about 50 km (31 mi) southeast of the provincial capital at Xi'an. The archaeological site is on the cliff faces of a gully in the Loess Plateau. Because loess is a soil made by extremely fine particles blown in by the wind, all larger rocks found in loess deposits had to have been carried in by humans or other animals.

== Discovery and excavation ==
Lantian County is where fossils of the Homo erectus, now called Lantian Man, were discovered in 1964. The oldest fossil, a skull, was initially dated to 1.15 million years ago. In 2001, geologist Zhu Zhaoyu and other scientists began researching the site again, and determined that the skull was 1.63 million years old.

Zhu's team surveyed the region around the fossil site, and discovered stone tools buried deep in the side of a gully in Shangchen, less than three miles away. The team, later joined by British paleoanthropologist Robin Dennell in 2010, thoroughly searched the gully and excavated the site between 2004 and 2017, and their findings were published in July 2018 in the journal Nature.

A total of 96 stone tools have been found at Shangchen, including flakes, points, and cores. They were found in 17 artefact layers.

== Date ==
The oldest artefact-bearing layer at the site was dated at 2.12 million years ago, while the youngest was dated to 1.26 million years, indicating that the site was occupied (not necessarily continuously) for 850,000 years. Some of the supposed tools were found with bone fragments of animals including deer and bovines. Even older remains may still lie undiscovered, as the deepest layers at Shangchen are inaccessible as of 2018 because the area is "actively farmed".

The findings are potentially highly significant as, according to the authors of the study, they may represent one of the earliest evidence of hominins outside Africa after Masol(fr) in India (the Masol finds are controversial as well), surpassing Dmanisi in the Caucasus region of Georgia, which is the oldest confirmed Lower Paleolithic site outside Africa, dating to 1.85 million years ago. It is also older than the Yuanmou Man, the oldest hominin fossils found in East Asia, dating to 1.7 million years. As the Shangchen site lacks volcanic minerals which are abundant in African sites, the study dated the sediments using the paleomagnetism method.

The authors of the study argue that a natural origin of the claimed artefacts is ruled out as Shangchen and its immediate vicinity have no known ancient rivers, which might have carved natural rocks into shapes resembling human-made tools. Uninvolved scientists who reviewed the findings such as Michael Petraglia, an archaeologist at the Max Planck Institute for the Science of Human History in Jena, Germany consider the dates convincing.

Study co-author Robin Dennell talking to a Nature News reporter was cited as speculating that "the Shangchen toolmakers belonged to an earlier species in the genus Homo" than H. erectus, and one William Jungers (unaffiliated with the study) is cited as even reserving "the possibility that the Shangchen toolmaker was a species of Australopithecus".
