= Spheroid (lithic) =

Type of prehistoric stone artifact

In archaeology, a spheroid is a piece of rock that has been shaped into a nearly spherical shape (spheroidal). Spheroids have been found at sites from as long ago as 1.8 million years. It is not known what their purpose was, but it has been speculated that they were used as projectiles in hunting. At one site (Ubeidiya prehistoric site near the Sea of Galilee, 1.4 million years old) around 600 baseball-sized spheroids of limestone, basalt, and flint have been found, and it has been demonstrated that they were not simply hand axes that became spherical through use, but were deliberately made as spheres. Similarly, at Qianshangying (North China), spheroids dating to 429 ka can be quantitatively distinguished from polyhedrons and exhausted cores, showing strong evidence that some were deliberately shaped using a conceptual template, not just byproducts of core reduction.
