= Bahinolophus =

Bahinolophus Temporal range: Eocene

Scientific classification
- Kingdom: Animalia
- Phylum: Chordata
- Class: Mammalia
- Order: Perissodactyla
- Family: †Deperetellidae
- Genus: †Bahinolophus; Tsubamoto, 2005
- Species: †B. birmanicus

Binomial name
- †Bahinolophus birmanicus Pilgrim, 1925

Extinct genus of mammals

Bahinolophus is an extinct genus of herbivorous mammals that flourished in the middle Eocene and were related to tapirs. The genus was defined in 2005.
