= Lantian County =

Lantian County 蓝田县 Lantien
- County
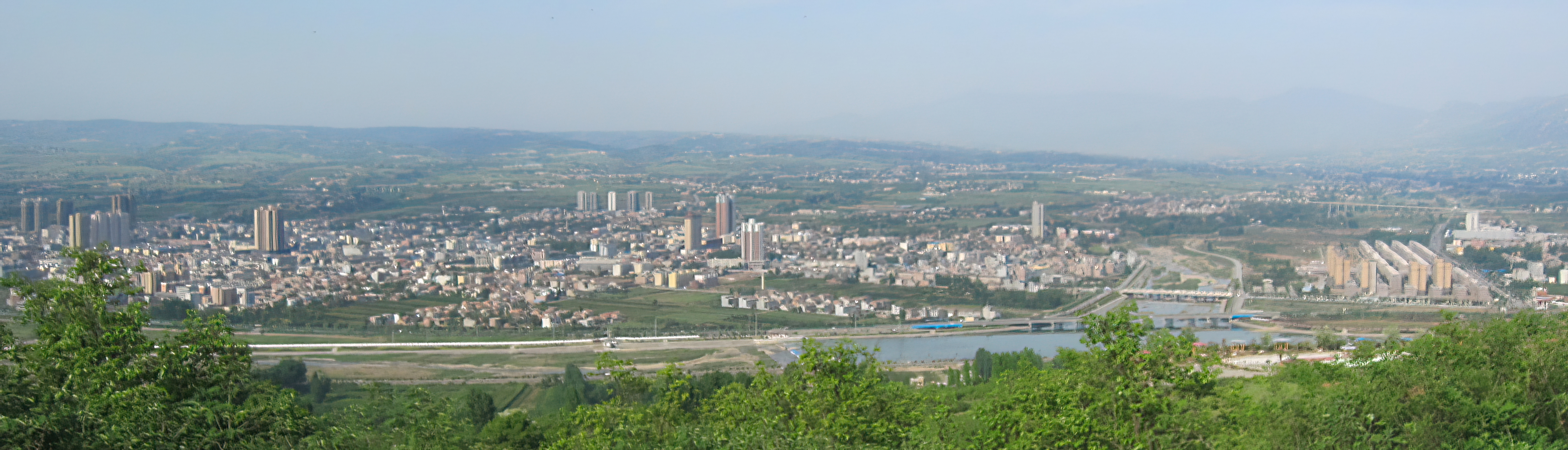
- View of central Lantian

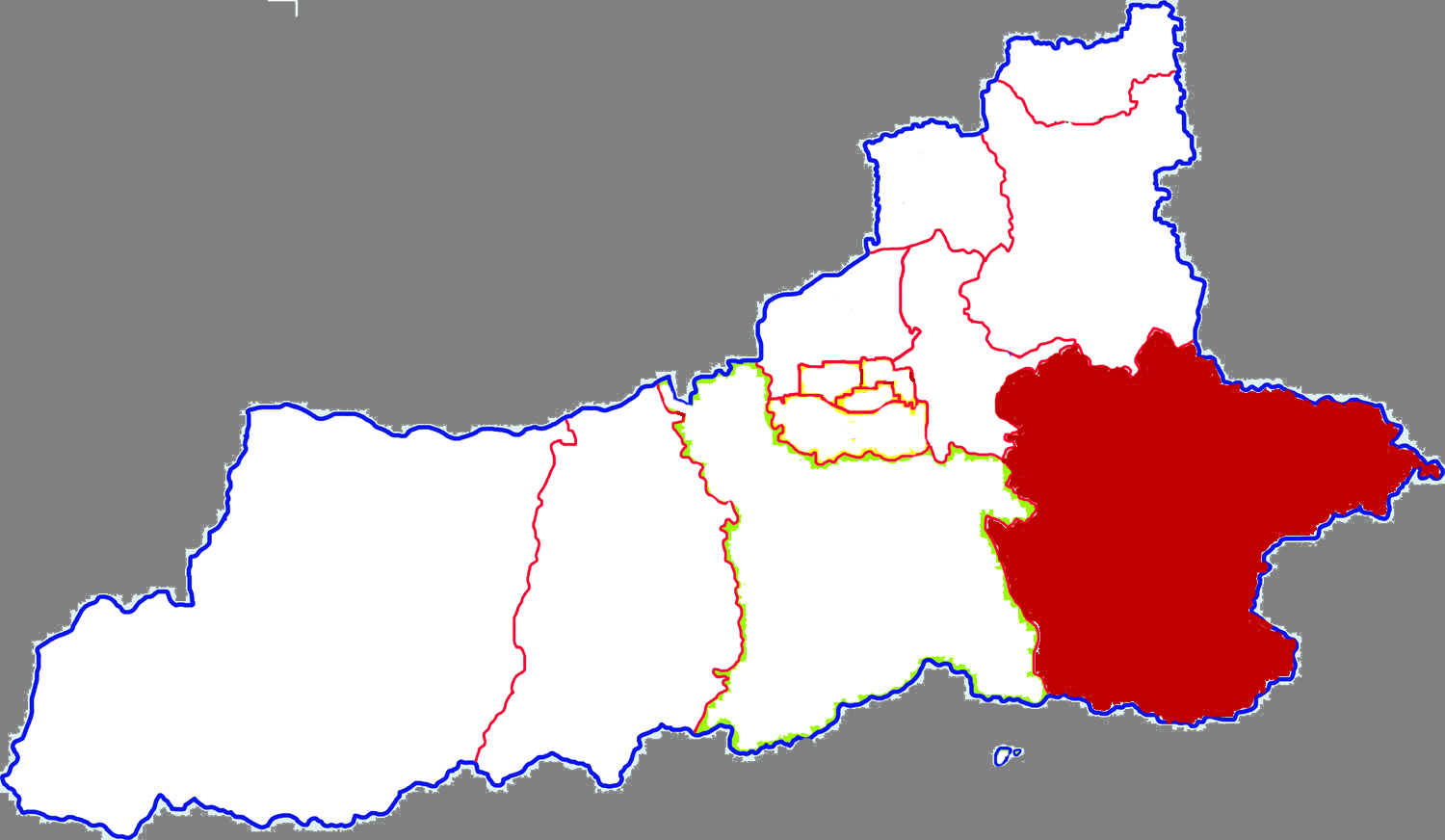
- Location of the county in Xi'an
- Coordinates: 34°08′56″N 109°19′08″E
- Country: People's Republic of China
- Province: Shaanxi
- Sub-provincial city: Xi'an
- Divisions: 19 township-level divisions (1 subdistrict and 18 towns) and 346 village-level divisions (9 communities and 337 villages)

Area
  - Total: 2,005.95 km^{2} (774.50 sq mi)

Population (2019)
  - Total: 536,100
  - Density: 256.25/km^{2} (663.7/sq mi)
- Time zone: UTC+8 (China Standard)
- Postal code: 710500
- Website: www.lantian.gov.cn

Lantian County (simplified Chinese: 蓝田县; traditional Chinese: 藍田縣; pinyin: Lántián Xiàn) is a county under the administration of Xi'an, the capital of Shaanxi province, China. It is the easternmost and second-most spacious (after Zhouzhi County) of the 13 county-level divisions of Xi'an. The county borders the prefecture-level cities of Weinan to the northeast and Shangluo to the southeast, Lintong District to the north, Chang'an District to the west, and Baqiao District to the northwest.

== Toponymy ==
Lantian County was first founded in 379 BCE, and was named after the nearby Lantian Mountain (simplified Chinese: 蓝田山; traditional Chinese: 藍田山; pinyin: Lántián Shān), located 30 kilometres (19 mi) to the southeast of the current county seat.

== History ==
Lantian County was first established in 379 BCE, in present-day Huaxu, 30 kilometres (19 mi) west of its current seat. The county was named for the nearby Lantian Mountain (simplified Chinese: 蓝田山; traditional Chinese: 藍田山; pinyin: Lántián Shān). Numerous ancient Chinese texts, such as the Taiping Huanyu Ji and the Rites of Zhou state that the mountain was renown for its jade.

From 446 CE to 487 CE, under the Xianbei-led Northern Wei, Lantian County was merged into Bacheng County (simplified Chinese: 霸城县; traditional Chinese: 霸城縣; pinyin: Bàchéng Xiàn). Upon its restoration, it was placed under the jurisdiction of Jingzhao Commandery (Chinese: 京兆郡; pinyin: Jīngzhào Jùn).

From 557 CE to 573 CE, under the Xianbei-led Northern Zhou, Lantian County was promoted and reorganized as Lantian Commandery. During this period, Lantian County was abolished, and Lantian Commandery administered two counties formed in its place: Yushan County (simplified Chinese: 玉山县; traditional Chinese: 玉山縣; pinyin: Yùshān Xiàn) and Bailu County (simplified Chinese: 白鹿县; traditional Chinese: 白鹿縣; pinyin: Báilù Xiàn). Upon the restoration of Lantian County in 573 CE, the county's seat of government was moved to the ancient city of Yaoliu (simplified Chinese: 峣柳城; traditional Chinese: 嶢柳城; pinyin: Yáoliǔ Chéng), located in present-day Languan Subdistrict.

In 619 CE, during the Tang dynasty, Bailu County was restored. Yushan County was also re-established the same year, with its seat of government in present-day Yushan. The following year Bailu County was renamed to Ningmin County (simplified Chinese: 宁民县; traditional Chinese: 寧民縣; pinyin: Níngmín Xiàn). Both counties were abolished again in 629 CE, and merged back into Lantian County, which was now under the jurisdiction of Jingzhao Fu (Chinese: 京兆府; pinyin: Jīngzhào Fǔ).

During the Ming and Qing dynasties, Lantian County was under the jurisdiction of Xi'an Fu (Chinese: 西安府; pinyin: Xī'ān Fǔ).

In 1913, following the establishment of the Republic of China, the county was placed under the jurisdiction of Guanzhong Circuit. Beginning in 1928, the county was under direct administration from the province of Shaanxi.

Following the establishment of the People's Republic of China in 1949, the county was placed under the administration of Weinan District (simplified Chinese: 渭南分区; traditional Chinese: 渭南分區; pinyin: Wèinán Fēnqū). The following year, Weinan District was re-organized as Weinan Prefecture (simplified Chinese: 渭南专区; traditional Chinese: 渭南專區; pinyin: Wèinán Zhuānqū). From 1956 to 1958, the county was directed administered by Shaanxi. In 1958, it was placed under the jurisdiction of Xi'an. From 1961 to 1983, Lantian County was returned to Weinan Prefecture. Weinan Prefecture. In 1983, Lantian County was once again placed under Xi'an, which it remains today.

In 2011, the county's 12 townships were reorganized as towns. On February 13, 2015, three of the county's towns were merged into other towns, and the town of Languan was reorganized as the county's sole subdistrict.

== Administrative divisions ==
Lantian County is divided into 1 subdistrict (Chinese: 街道; pinyin: jiēdào) and 18 towns (Chinese: 镇; pinyin: zhèn). These township-level divisions then in turn govern 9 residential communities (Chinese: 社区; pinyin: shèqū) and 337 administrative villages (Chinese: 行政村; pinyin: xíngzhèng cūn).

=== Subdistricts ===
The county's sole subdistrict is Languan Subdistrict (蓝关街道).

=== Towns ===
The county's 18 towns are as follows:

- Xiehu (洩湖镇/泄湖镇)
- Huaxu (华胥镇)
- Qianwei (前卫镇)
- Tangyu (汤峪镇)
- Jiaodai (焦岱镇)
- Yushan (玉山镇)
- Sanli (三里镇)
- Puhua (普化镇)
- Gepai (葛牌镇)
- Bayuan (灞源镇)
- Jiujianfang (九间房镇)
- Lanqiao (蓝桥镇)
- Wangchuan (辋川镇)
- Hou (厚镇)
- Sanguanmiao (三官庙镇)
- Ancun (安村镇)
- Mengcun (孟村镇)
- Xiaozhai (小寨镇)

=== Former administrative divisions ===
- Yuchuan (玉川镇, merged into Wangchuan in 2015)
- Jinshan (金山镇, merged into Sanguanmiao in 2015)
- Shijiazhai (史家寨镇, merged into Tangyu in 2015)
- Languan (蓝关镇, upgraded to Languan Subdistrict in 2015)

== Demographics ==
Historical population
Year	Pop.	±% p.a.
1996	605,000	—
2000	560,283	−1.90%
2010	514,026	−0.86%
2012	518,800	+0.46%

A 2012 estimate put the county's permanent population at 518,800. Per the 2010 Chinese Census, Lantian County's population totaled 514,026, down from the 560,283 recorded in the 2000 Chinese Census. Lantian County comprised 6.07% of Xi'an's population in 2010, down from 7.70% in 2000. A 1996 estimate put the county's population at about 605,000.

== Climate ==
Climate data for Lantian, elevation 540 m (1,770 ft), (1991–2020 normals, extremes 1991–present)
Month	Jan	Feb	Mar	Apr	May	Jun	Jul	Aug	Sep	Oct	Nov	Dec	Year
Record high °C (°F)	18.5 (65.3)	22.5 (72.5)	32.2 (90.0)	34.7 (94.5)	39.7 (103.5)	42.0 (107.6)	41.9 (107.4)	39.7 (103.5)	40.0 (104.0)	34.7 (94.5)	26.1 (79.0)	19.1 (66.4)	42.0 (107.6)
Mean daily maximum °C (°F)	5.0 (41.0)	9.5 (49.1)	15.7 (60.3)	22.0 (71.6)	26.8 (80.2)	31.6 (88.9)	32.7 (90.9)	30.7 (87.3)	25.7 (78.3)	19.5 (67.1)	12.7 (54.9)	6.6 (43.9)	19.9 (67.8)
Daily mean °C (°F)	−1.2 (29.8)	2.8 (37.0)	8.6 (47.5)	14.5 (58.1)	19.5 (67.1)	25.0 (77.0)	27.0 (80.6)	25.1 (77.2)	20.1 (68.2)	13.7 (56.7)	6.5 (43.7)	0.3 (32.5)	13.5 (56.3)
Mean daily minimum °C (°F)	−5.6 (21.9)	−2.0 (28.4)	3.0 (37.4)	8.1 (46.6)	13.0 (55.4)	18.8 (65.8)	21.9 (71.4)	20.4 (68.7)	15.6 (60.1)	9.4 (48.9)	2.1 (35.8)	−4.0 (24.8)	8.4 (47.1)
Record low °C (°F)	−16.5 (2.3)	−13.4 (7.9)	−9.3 (15.3)	−4.0 (24.8)	1.8 (35.2)	9.3 (48.7)	13.6 (56.5)	11.1 (52.0)	5.7 (42.3)	−3.1 (26.4)	−11.7 (10.9)	−21.2 (−6.2)	−21.2 (−6.2)
Average precipitation mm (inches)	8.3 (0.33)	13.8 (0.54)	25.9 (1.02)	48.4 (1.91)	69.2 (2.72)	84.9 (3.34)	111.2 (4.38)	113.9 (4.48)	114.3 (4.50)	65.7 (2.59)	29.2 (1.15)	7.4 (0.29)	692.2 (27.25)
Average precipitation days (≥ 0.1 mm)	4.6	4.8	6.5	8.0	9.8	9.2	11.9	11.2	12.2	10.5	6.6	4.0	99.3
Average snowy days	5.3	3.7	1.5	0.2	0	0	0	0	0	0	1.5	3.3	15.5
Average relative humidity (%)	66	65	64	67	65	59	67	74	76	77	76	69	69
Mean monthly sunshine hours	134.6	134.7	170.1	194.4	210.6	216.8	223.3	194.8	152.4	134.7	130.9	135.6	2,032.9
Percentage possible sunshine	43	43	46	50	49	50	51	47	42	39	42	44	46
Source: China Meteorological Administration

== Transport ==
- China National Highway 312

== See also ==
- Lantian Man
- Shangchen, palaeolithic site in Lantian
- Wangchuan ji
