= Guixia =

Guixia Temporal range: Middle or Late Eocene

Scientific classification
- Kingdom: Animalia
- Phylum: Chordata
- Class: Mammalia
- Order: Perissodactyla
- Family: Rhinocerotidae
- Genus: †Guixia; You, 1977

Type species
- †Guixia youjiangensis You, 1977

Other species
- †G. simplex You, 1977

Extinct genus of mammals

Guixia is an extinct genus of rhinocerotid native to modern-day China during the Middle or Late Eocene. Guixia fossils have been found in Guangxi and two species have been named, G. youjiangensis from the Gongkang Formation and G. simplex from the Naduo Formation. Fossils of Guixia have also been reported from Thailand. Guixia is one of the earliest rhinoceroses recorded in China.

== History of research ==
Guixia yougiangensis and Guixia simplex were named by Y. Z. You in 1977, both based on isolated teeth. The original fossils of both species were found in Guangxi, China. G. youjiangensis is from the Gongkang Formation and G. simplex is from the Naduo Formation. Both formations are variously dated to the Middle or Late Eocene.

In 1989, Donald Prothero and Robert M. Schoch listed Guixia as a synonym of the paracerathere Juxia. Later authors have continued to regard Guixia as a rhinocerotid, and a distinct genus.
