= Anthracothema =

Anthracothema Temporal range: Late Eocene

Scientific classification
- Domain: Eukaryota
- Kingdom: Animalia
- Phylum: Chordata
- Class: Mammalia
- Order: Artiodactyla
- Family: †Anthracotheriidae
- Genus: †Anthracothema

Species
- †A. pangan (Pilgrim and Cotter, 1916) (type)

Extinct genus of mammals

Anthracothema was a genus of extinct artiodactyl ungulate mammals that lived in Myanmar during the late Eocene.

== Taxonomy ==
Ducrocq (1999) and Tsubamoto et al. (2002) considered Anthracothema a synonym of Anthracotherium. However, Lihoreau et al. (2004) and Scherler et al. (2018) rejected the synonymy, with the latter recovering it as sister to Myaingtherium and Siamotherium.
