= Eodesmatodon =

Scientific classification
- Kingdom: Animalia
- Phylum: Chordata
- Class: Mammalia
- Family: †Aegialodontidae
- Genus: †Eodesmatodon; Zheng & Chi, 1978

Extinct genus of mammals

Eodesmatodon is an extinct genus of herbivorous mammals in the family Aegialodontidae.
