= Bose Basin =

Archeological site in Guangxi, China

- Location within China
- 23.6°N 108.3°E
- Periods: Paleolithic China
- Location: Baise
- Region: Guangxi

History
- Built: 2,000,000 years ago
- Abandoned: 800,000 years ago

The Bose Basin (百色盆地高岭坡遗址) is in the western part of Guangxi province in southern China, around the city of Baise (Bose), and is the site of the oldest known cutting tools of the Acheulean archaeological industry in China. It is about 800 square kilometres (300 sq mi) in area.

The first discovery was in 1973, when petroleum geologists accidentally ran across a dozen stone artifacts. Paleolithic stone tools, notably hand axes have since been found at 114 sites in the basin. They were found in a tektite layer dated to 800,000 years ago. Fossils in some of the caves may be 2 million years old.
