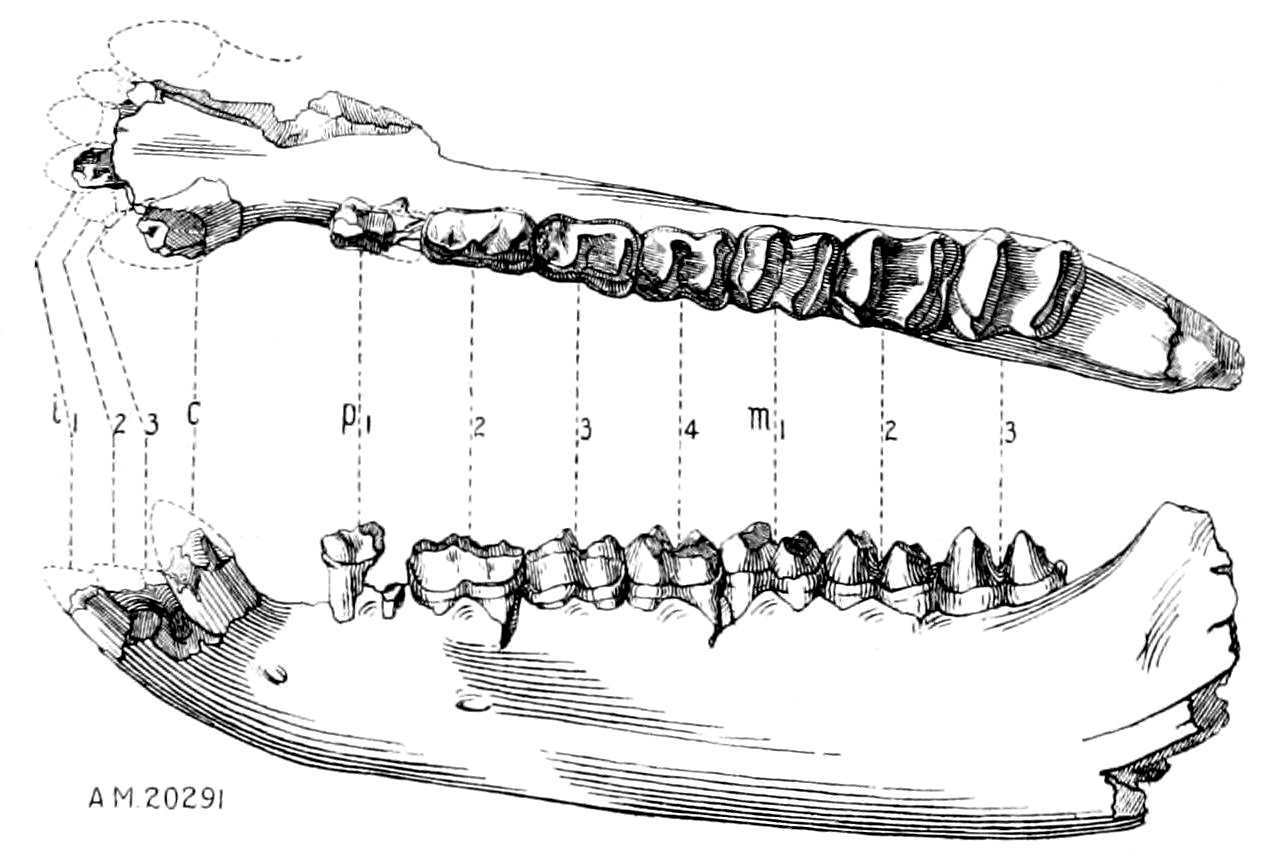
- Lower jaw of Deperetella cristata

Scientific classification
- Kingdom: Animalia
- Phylum: Chordata
- Class: Mammalia
- Order: Perissodactyla
- Family: †Deperetellidae
- Genus: †Deperetella; Matthew & Granger, 1925

Type species
- †Deperetella cristata Matthew & Granger, 1925

Species
- D. cristata Matthew & Granger, 1925 (type); D. depereti Zdansky, 1930; D. dienensis Chow et al., 1974; D. khaitchinulensis Reshetov, 1979; D. kungeica Tarasov, 1968; D. sichuanensis Xu et al., 1979; D. similis

Synonyms
- Cristidentinus?; Diplolophodon?

= Deperetella =

Deperetella Temporal range: Eocene

Extinct genus of mammals

Deperetella is an extinct genus of deperetellid perissodactyls from Middle to Late Eocene of Asia. The genus was defined in 1925 by W. D. Matthew and Walter W. Granger, who named it after French paleontologist Charles Depéret. The type species is Deperetella cristata.

== Description ==
The front-root teeth (premolars) are longer than the posterior-root teeth (molars), there are well-developed hypolophides on P3-P4, and the forelimbs are three-toed. It differs from Teleolophus in the size of the molars. Postcranial skeleton of Deperetella shares many similarities with that of Teleolophus, in particular: long and slender limbs, relatively elongated and narrow lunar with a slightly concave medial edge of the radial facet, fibula reduced or fused with the tibia, and three functional fingers on the limbs.

== Taxonomy ==
The genus Diplolophodon, erected by Zdansky (1930) based on an upper dentition from the Heti Formation, China, was suggested by Radinsky (1965) to be a junior synonym of Deperetella. In Reshetov and Tatarinov (1979), Tsubamoto et al. (2000) and later works Diplolophodon is also considered as a synonym of Deperetella. However, it recovered as a valid genus in Deperetellidae family in a work of Bai Bin (2023). The species Deperetella birmanica from Myanmar was assigned to the new genus Bahinolophus in 2005.
