= Teleolophus =

Teleolophus Temporal range: Eocene

Scientific classification
- Kingdom: Animalia
- Phylum: Chordata
- Class: Mammalia
- Order: Perissodactyla
- Family: †Deperetellidae
- Genus: †Teleolophus; Matthew & Granger, 1925

Type species
- †Teleolophus medius Matthew & Granger, 1925

Species
- T. danjiangensis; T. daviesi; T. magnus; T. medius; T. rectus; T. sichuanensis; T. zaisanicus

Extinct genus of mammals

Teleolophus is an extinct genus of herbivorous mammals related to tapirs that flourished in the Eocene of Asia.
