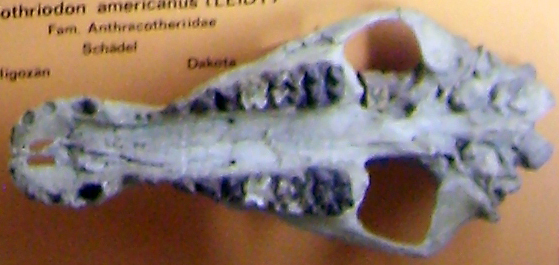
- Bothriodon americanus skull at the Museum für Naturkunde, Berlin

Scientific classification
- Kingdom: Animalia
- Phylum: Chordata
- Class: Mammalia
- Infraclass: Placentalia
- Order: Artiodactyla
- Family: †Anthracotheriidae
- Genus: †Bothriodon; Aymard, 1848

= Bothriodon =

Bothriodon Temporal range: Late Eocene

Extinct genus of mammals

Bothriodon is an extinct genus of anthracotheriid artiodactyl from the late Eocene to early Oligocene of Asia, Europe, and North America.

== Description ==
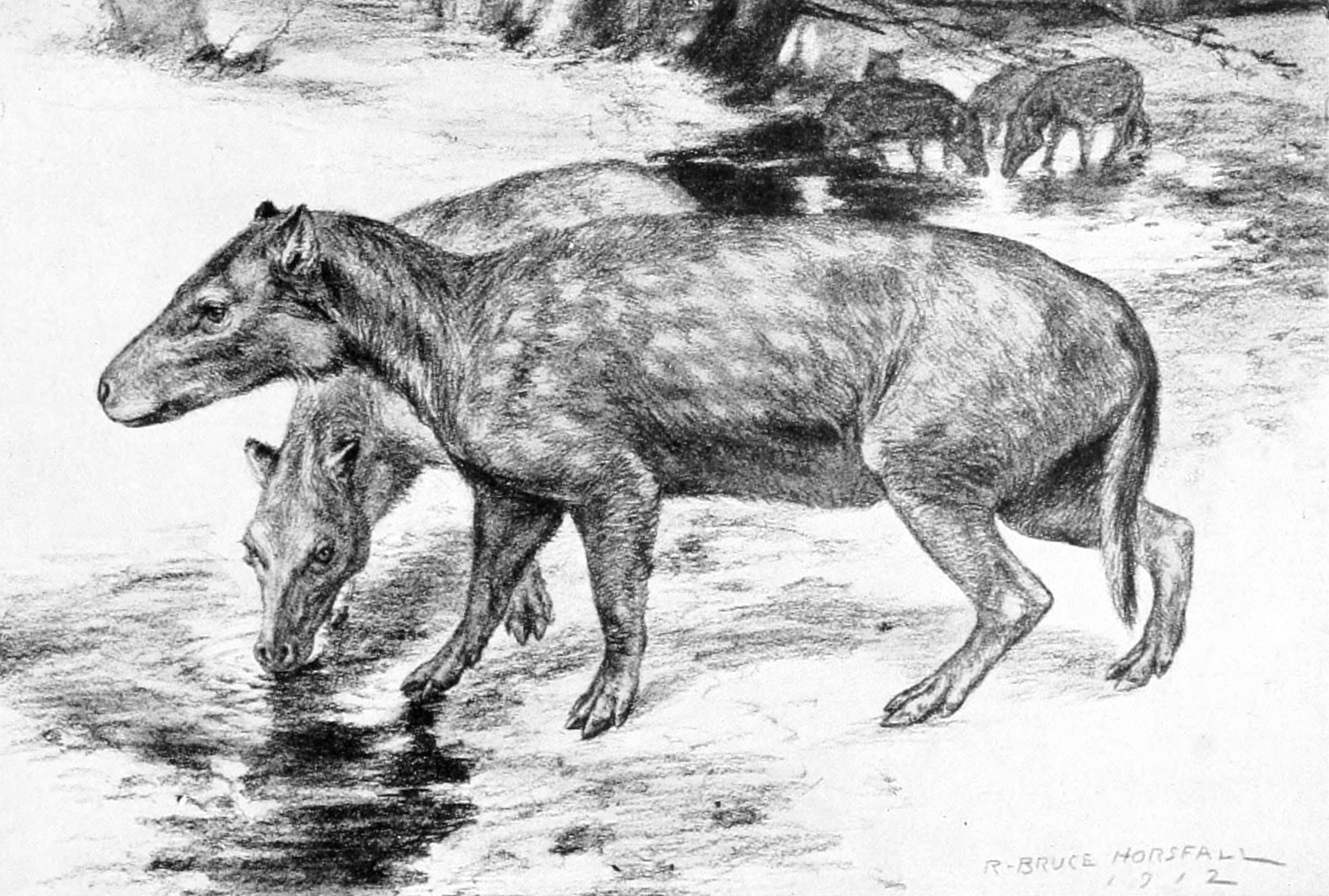
Life reconstruction by Robert Bruce Horsfall, 1913

Bothriodon was about the size of a large pig, reaching an estimated weight of more than 199 kg (439 lbs). Bothriodon possesses molars transitional between bunodont and selenodont in morphology. Alongside this, the upper molars possess 5 cusps as opposed to the derived 4. They also possessed a reduced pollex on the 5 toed manus.
