= Guilestes =

Guilestes Temporal range: Late Eocene

Scientific classification
- Kingdom: Animalia
- Phylum: Chordata
- Class: Mammalia
- Infraclass: Placentalia
- Order: †Mesonychia
- Family: †Mesonychidae
- Genus: †Guilestes; Zheng & Chi, 1978
- Species: †G. acares

Binomial name
- †Guilestes acares Zheng & Chi, 1978

Guilestes acares is a mesonychid mesonychian mammal that lived during the late Eocene in southern China. Fossils, primarily jaw fragments and teeth, are found in latest Eocene-aged strata from the Nado Formation, of Guanxi. It is similar in size to Dissacus and some of the smaller species of Yantanglestes (synonym "Lestes"), and differs from either by having no metaconids whatsoever on the trigonids of the lower molars, and a loss of M^{3}.
