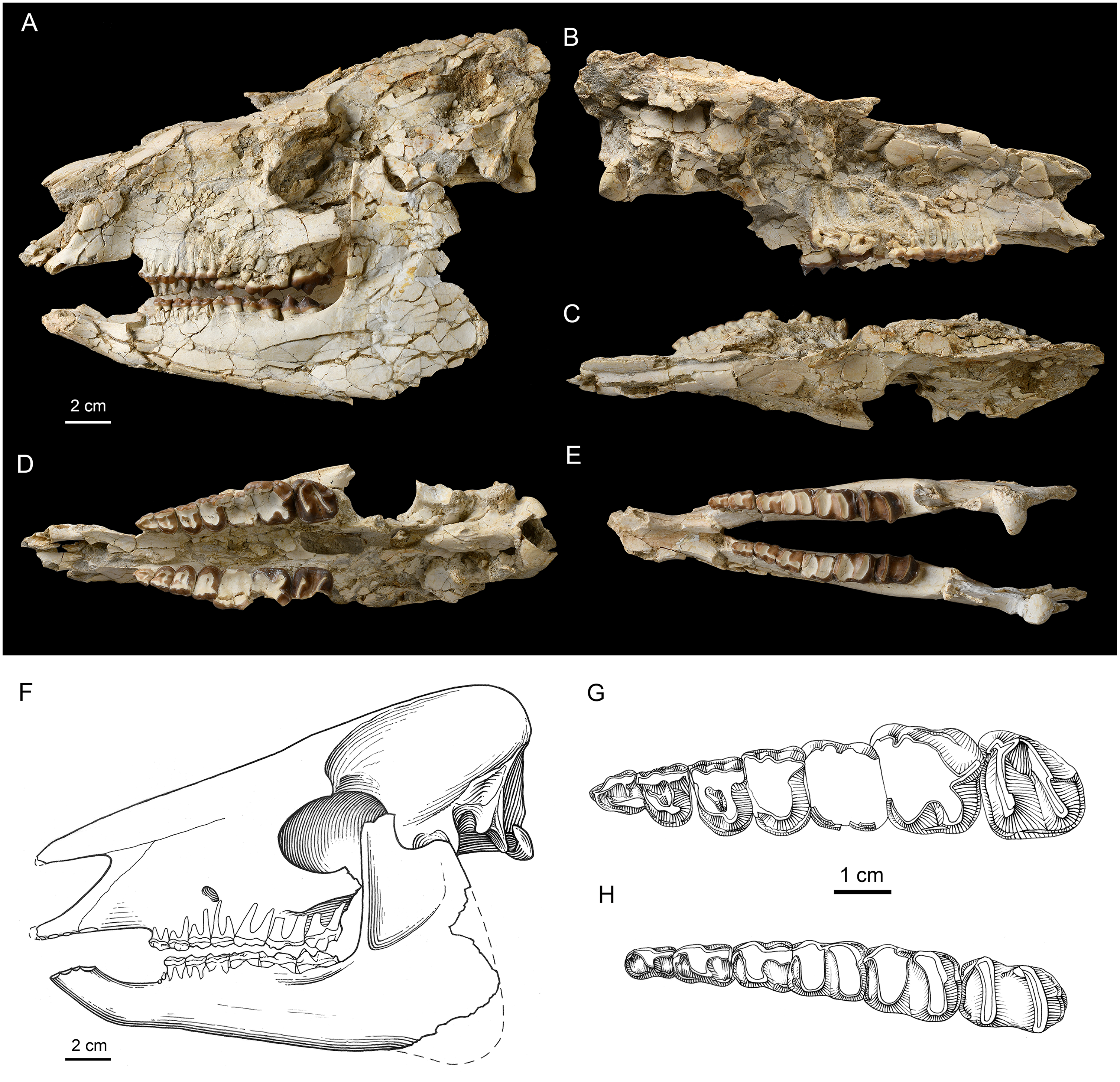
- Skull of Irenolophus

Scientific classification
- Kingdom: Animalia
- Phylum: Chordata
- Class: Mammalia
- Order: Perissodactyla
- Superfamily: Tapiroidea
- Family: †Deperetellidae; Radinsky, 1965

Genera
- †Bahinolophus; †Cristidentinus; †Deperetella; †Diplolophodon; †Irenolophus; †Teleolophus

= Deperetellidae =

Deperetellidae Temporal range: Eocene

Extinct family of odd-toed ungulates

Deperetellidae is an extinct family of herbivorous odd-toed ungulates containing the genera Bahinolophus, Deperetella, Irenolophus, and Teleolophus. Their closest living relatives are tapirs. Deperetellids are known from the Middle Eocene deposits of China, Mongolia, Kyrgyzstan and Myanmar.

Most deperetellids are known by fragmentary jaws and skull elements. Members of Deperetellidae are medium to large-sized animals distinguished from other tapiroids by their high crowned and very bilophodont molars.
