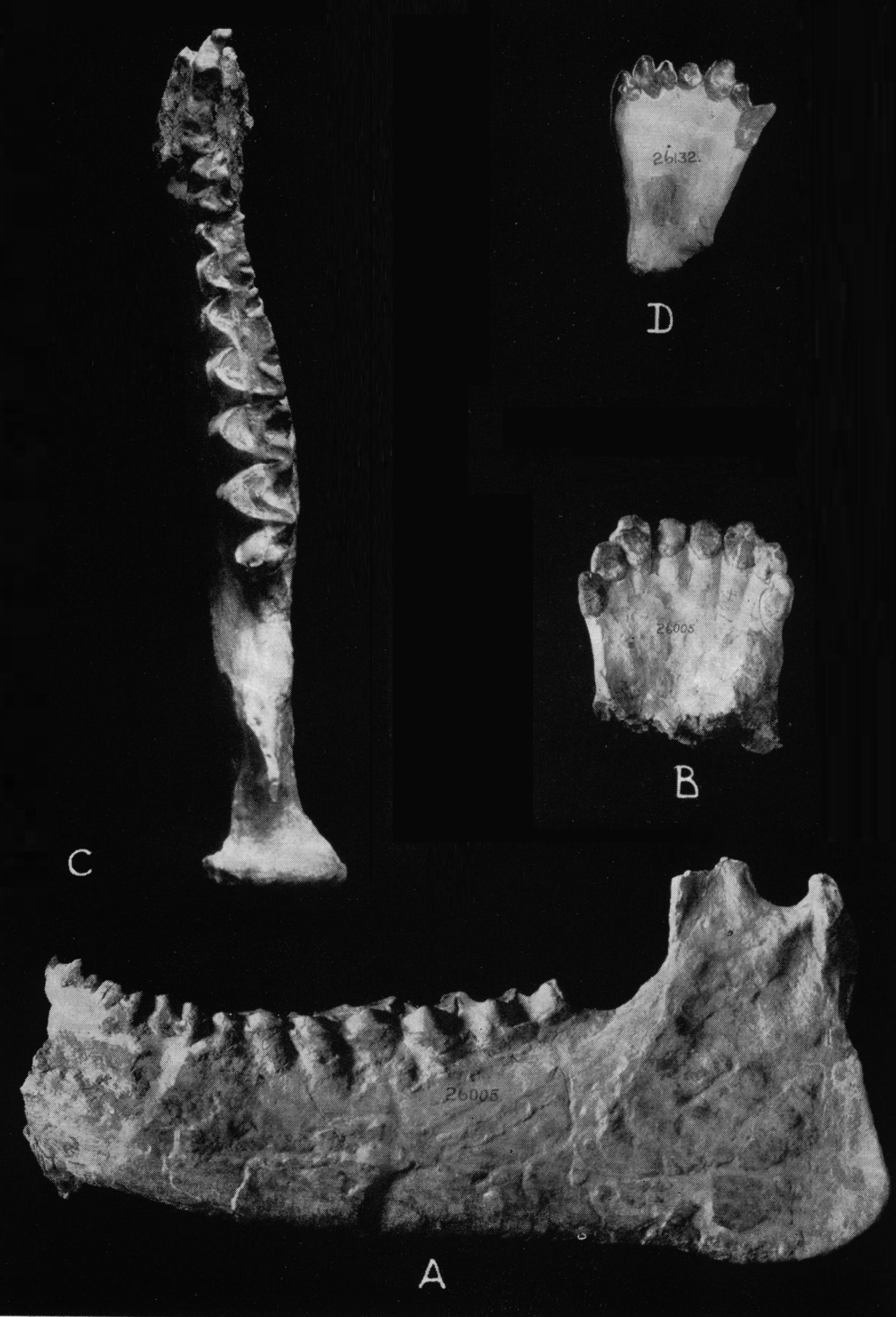
- A–C: the type jaw of T. ingens (AMNH 26005); D: part of the type jaw of T. minor (AMNH 26132)

Scientific classification
- Kingdom: Animalia
- Phylum: Chordata
- Class: Mammalia
- Order: Perissodactyla
- Family: †Brontotheriidae
- Subfamily: †Brontotheriinae
- Tribe: †Brontotheriini
- Subtribe: †Brontotheriina
- Infratribe: †Embolotheriita
- Genus: †Titanodectes; Granger & Gregory, 1943

Type species
- †Titanodectes ingens Granger & Gregory, 1943

Other species
- †T. minor Granger & Gregory, 1943

= Titanodectes =

Titanodectes Temporal range: Middle–Late Eocene (Sharamurunian–Ulangochuian), 42.7–37.8 Ma

Extinct genus of mammals

Titanodectes (lit. 'titanic biter') is an extinct genus of horned brontothere that lived in East Asia during the Middle to Late Eocene, in the Sharamurunian and Ulangochuian land mammal ages. Two species of Titanodectes have been named, the type species T. ingens and the smaller T. minor, both known from Inner Mongolia in China.

Titanodectes was a very large brontothere, though its precise size is unknown since the genus is known only from lower jaws. The largest known Titanodectes jaw, assigned to T. ingens, measures 69 centimeters (27 in) long. Titanodectes has been suggested to be a junior synonym of the better-known Embolotherium. Recent arguments against synonymy have cited the lack of comparative fossil material and the occurrence of the two genera in different localities and stratigraphic horizons.

== Research history ==
Titanodectes was described by Walter W. Granger and William King Gregory in 1943. The type species, T. ingens, was based on a large lower jaw, preserving the front teeth and some worn cheek teeth (AMNH 26005). Granger and Gregory also named a second species, T. minor, based on an incomplete lower jaw with only some of the teeth preserved (AMNH 26132). Both of the type specimens were originally recorded by Granger and Gregory to be from the Shara Murun Formation of Inner Mongolia; precise locality data was provided only for the T. ingens jaw, which was found at Jhama Obo, East Mesa. Granger and Gregory also referred some additional fossils to T. minor, including another incomplete jaw from the Shara Murun Formation (AMNH 21600), as well as two incomplete jaws from the slightly later Ulan Gochu Formation (AMNH 26021 and AMNH 26012).

The genus name Titanodectes means "titanic biter", derived from Greek Τιτάν (Tītā́n, Titan) and δεκτες (dektes, "biter"). Granger and Gregory considered Titanodectes to be intermediate between Rhinotitan and Embolotherium. The two Titanodectes species were distinguished from each other by Granger and Gregory mainly by the larger size of T. ingens.

The Ulan Gochu Formation overlies the Shara Murun Formation, and the deposits at different localities are continuous, which has historically led to the two formations being poorly distinguished. Following modern reassessments, Bai et al. (2025) reassessed AMNH 26005 to be from the Ulan Gochu Formation, but maintained the Shara Murun provenance for AMNH 26132.

== Description ==
Titanodectes was a very large brontothere. The lower jaw of T. ingens measured 69 centimeters (27 in) and that of T. minor measured 61.9 centimeters (24.4 in). Since Titanodectes is known only from lower jaws, little can be said about its overall appearance. The skull of Titanodectes, at least T. ingens, was probably similar to that of the closely related Embolotherium.

=== Dentition ===
Titanodectes had the lower dental formula 3.1.4.3. The three pairs of lower incisors were arranged in a slightly curved row and forwardly directed scoop. The second pair of lower incisors were larger than the first and third pair. The tooth crowns of the first and second pair of lower incisors had a semispatulate (akin to a spatula) shape, while the tooth crowns of the third pair of lower incisors were more cone-like. In both AMNH 26005 and 21600, the canines are about as large as the incisors. The canines of AMNH 26132 are noticeably larger than the incisors, and more curved. The canines in all known specimens were relatively small in general, while the incisors of all known specimens were exceptionally large. There was no diastema (gap between teeth) between the lower incisors and canines, but there was a diastema between the lower canines and premolars. The first pair of premolars were much smaller than the rest of the cheek teeth. The third and fourth pairs of premolars had metaconids (one of the cusps); the second pair of premolars sometimes did and sometimes did not. The trigonid (shearing part) and talonid (crushing part) varied between the different premolars; in the second pair of premolars, the trigonid and talonid were about equally long; in the third and fourth pair of premolars, the talonid was longer than the trigonid. The molars of Titanodectes were exceptionally large, with deep basins. The third molar was elongated when compared to the others.

== Classification ==
In 1943, Granger and Gregory classified Titanodectes in the brontothere subfamily "Embolotheriinae", as did Malcolm McKenna and Susan K. Bell in 1997. In modern brontothere taxonomy, "Embolotheriinae" corresponds to the infratribe Embolotheriita.

=== Possible synonymy with Embolotherium ===
The better known genus Embolotherium is another very large brontothere known from Late Eocene Inner Mongolia. Granger and Gregory distinguished Titanodectes from Embolotherium by dental features, comparing the Titanodectes mandibles to AMNH 26040, a partial juvenile mandible referred to Embolotherium grangeri. Granger and Gregory interpreted a ridge along the side of AMNH 26040 as the premaxillomaxillary suture (the suture between the premaxilla and maxilla). This in turn led them to interpret the teeth at the front of the skull as the second and third pairs of incisors, and the canines. They interpreted the first pair of incisors to have been lost in AMNH 26040, and thus Embolotherium to only have had two pairs of lower incisors.

In 2004, Matthew C. Mihlbachler, Spencer G. Lucas, Robert J. Emry, and Bolat Bayshashov referred to Titanodectes as a "somewhat dubious taxon". In 2008, Mihlbachler designated both Titanodectes species as junior synonyms of Embolotherium grangeri, and treated all of the Titanodectes fossils as lower jaws of adult E. grangeri. Mihlbachler pointed out several errors in Granger and Gregory's interpretations of the dentition of Embolotherium (and Titanodectes) fossils. Notably, Granger and Gregory's interpretation of the teeth of AMNH 26040 is wrong; the teeth interpreted as two pairs of incisors and one pair of canines are actuall three pairs of incisors, which removes the main distinguishing feature between the two genera. Mihlbachler further noted that the metaconid presence on the second premolar apparently being a variable trait is something Titanodectes shares with Embolotherium andrewsi, suggesting close relations. One of the two Ulan Gochu Titanodectes jaws, AMNH 26021, was referred to Parabrontops cf. gobiensis by Mihlbachler.

In 2018, Bai et al. rejected the synonymization with Embolotherium and treated Titanodectes as a valid genus. Bai et al. (2018) noted that no reliable lower dentition of adult E. grangeri has been reported, which makes actual comparison (and thus confident synonymy) impossible. Furthermore, Titanodectes and Embolotherium were noted to be known from different localities, and different horizons. Subsequent papers by Bai and colleagues have maintained Titanodectes as valid.

== Paleoecology ==
=== Temporal range ===
The original description by Granger and Gregory placed fossils of both T. ingens and T. minor in the Shara Murun Formation, and some additional fossils of T. minor in the Ulan Gochu Formation. This would indicate that both species lived during the Sharamurunian land mammal age, with T. minor persisting into the succeeding Ulangochuian land mammal age. Later assessments of the provenance of the fossils have varied slightly. Bai et al. (2020) placed Titanodectes later, in the Ulangochuian and Ergilian land mammal ages, with no Sharamurunian record at all. In a later and more detailed assessment, Bai et al. (2025) retained Granger and Gregory's original assessment of the T. minor fossils, placing that species in the Sharamurunian and Ulangochuian. Bai et al. (2025) reassessed AMNH 26005 (the type and only specimen of T. ingens) to be from the Ulan Gochu Formation, and thus to be Ulangochuian in age.

=== Habitat and contemporary taxa ===
The Erlian Basin, in which both the Shara Murun Formation and the Ulan Gochu Formation are situated, experienced a subtropical and humid climate during the Eocene. The vegetation was highly diverse and dominated by deciduous trees and shrubs. The Sharamurunian fauna was broadly similar to the faunas of the preceding Arshantan and Irdinmanhan land mammal ages. A notable exception was the disappearance and near-disappearance of several archaic groups, such pantodonts and dinoceratans. Perissodactyl diversity is noted to have been very high, especially in the case of brontotheres and amynodonts.

Titanodectes coexisted with other brontotheres in both the Sharamurunian and Ulangochuian. Parabrontops and Rhinotitan are known from the Shara Murun Formation, and the Ulan Gochu Formation brontotheres included Embolotherium and Nasamplus. Some taxa are known from both formations, such as the amynodont Cadurcodon, entelodont Brachyhyops, paracerathere Juxia, and the large mesonychid Mongolestes. Other amynodonts are also known from the Shara Murun, such as Sharamynodon, as are various rhinocerotoids (such as Pappaceras and Triplopus) and tapiroids (Deperetella). The Shara Murun Formation also preserves fossils of primitive ruminants (Lophiomeryx) and hyaenodonts ("Pterodon" hyaenoides). In the Ulan Gochu, amynodonts were also represented by Amynodontopsis and Zaisanamynodon, paraceratheres by Urtinotherium, and hyaenodonts by Hyaenodon.
