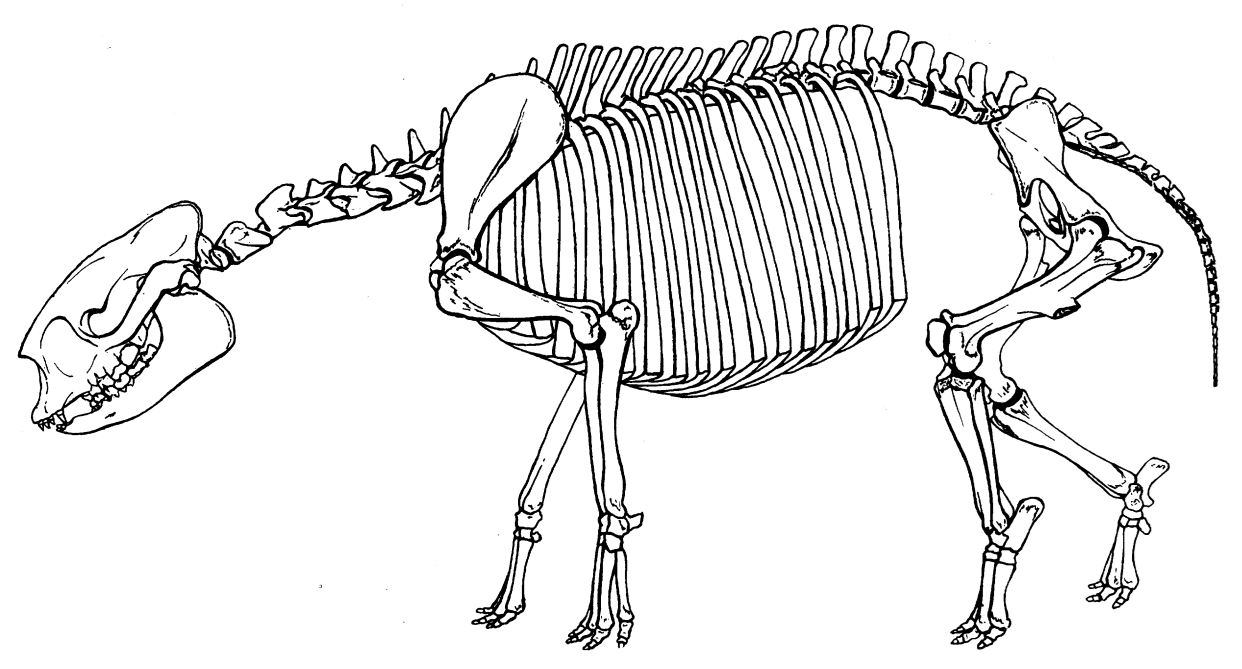
- Skeletal reconstruction of the S. mongoliensis type specimen (AMNH 20278)

Scientific classification
- Kingdom: Animalia
- Phylum: Chordata
- Class: Mammalia
- Order: Perissodactyla
- Superfamily: Rhinocerotoidea
- Family: †Amynodontidae
- Genus: †Sharamynodon; Kretzoi, 1942

Type species
- †Amynodon mongoliensis (original combination) Osborn, 1936

Species
- †S. kirghisensis? (Belyaeva, 1971); †S. menchiapuensis? (Zhou & Xu, 1965); †S. mongoliensis (Osborn, 1936)

Synonyms
- Genus synonymy: Lushiamynodon? Zhou & Xu, 1965; Synonyms of S. mongoliensis: Amynodon mongoliensis Osborn, 1936

= Sharamynodon =

Sharamynodon Temporal range: Middle–Late Eocene (Irdinmanhan–Sharamurunian), 47.8–39.9 Ma Possible Ypresian and Ergilian records

Extinct genus of mammals

Sharamynodon ("Shara [Murun] Amynodon") is an extinct genus of amynodont that lived in Central and East Asia during the Middle to Late Eocene, in the Irdinmanhan and Sharamurunian land mammal ages. The type species, S. mongoliensis, is known from fossils found in Kazakhstan and Inner Mongolia, China. S. mongoliensis stood about 1.4 meters (4.6 ft) tall at the withers and weighed about a tonne (1.1 short tonnes). Alongside contemporary brontotheres, it was one of the largest Asian ungulates of its time.

Sharamynodon was a relatively unspecialized amynodont, and was closely related to the contemporary North American genus Amynodon. Both the diversity and temporal range of Sharamynodon are disputed. A large number of amynodont species have been named based on fragmentary fossils from East Asia; several of these have been argued to possibly represent fossils of Sharamynodon, and additional species of the genus are sometimes recognized. The genus Lushiamynodon, known from China and Kyrgyzstan, has also been argued to possibly be a junior synonym of Sharamynodon.

== Research history ==
=== S. mongoliensis ===
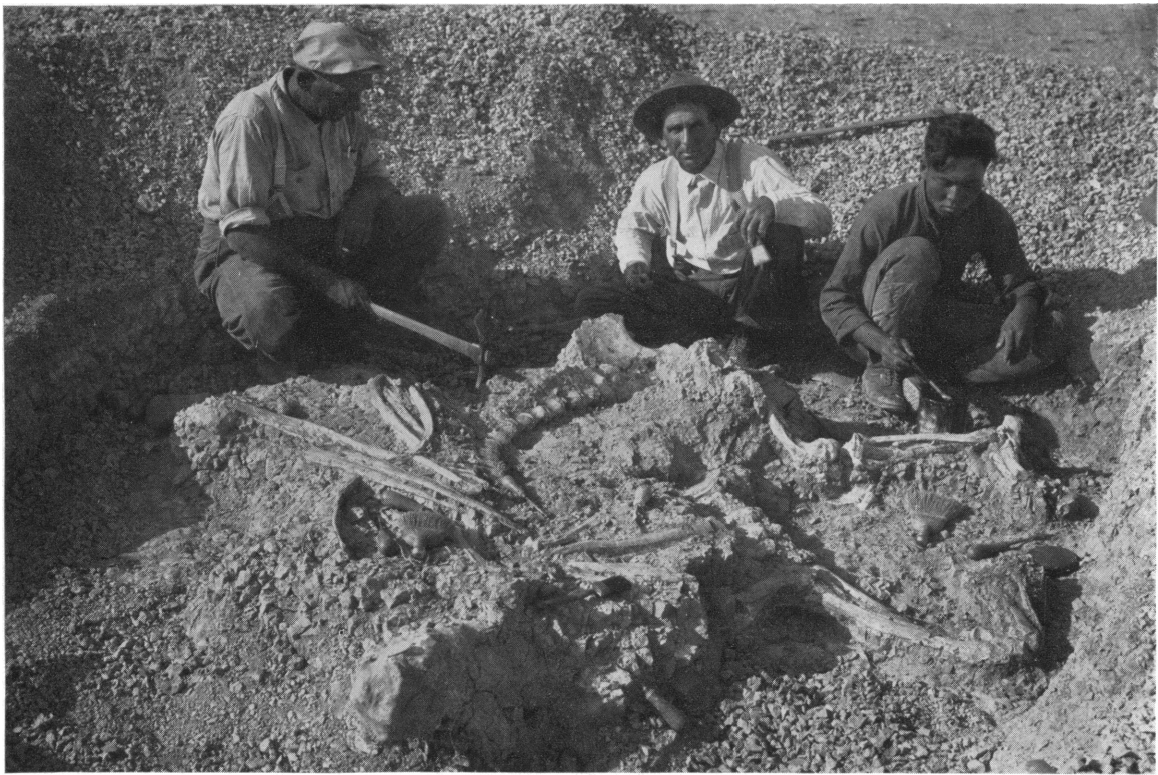
Excavation of the S. mongoliensis type specimen (AMNH 20278) at Ula Usu in Inner Mongolia, 1923

The first Sharamynodon fossils known to science were excavated at Ula Usu in the Shara Murun Formation of Inner Mongolia, China by an expedition from the American Museum of Natural History in June and September 1923. These fossils included a nearly complete skeleton with a sideways crushed skull (AMNH 20278), a left mandibular ramus (AMNH 20279), a left maxilla and left ramus (AMNH 20282), two associated mandibular rami (AMNH 20283), and the facial bones of a skull with some associated teeth (AMNH 20284). An additional specimen consisting of a skeleton, skull, and lower jaws of an old individual (AMNH 21601) was also found in the Shara Murun Formation in 1925. All of these fossils were briefly described in a posthumous publication by Henry Fairfield Osborn in 1936, as the new species Amynodon mongoliensis.

Osborn referred A. mongoliensis to Amynodon due to its resemblance to the North American species A. intermedius (today considered a synonym of A. advenus), but did not elaborate significantly on the classification. In 1942, Miklós Kretzoi proposed that A. mongoliensis should be moved to a new genus due to several anatomical differences from the North American forms. Among these differences, Kretzoi mentioned that A. mongoliensis had a different shape and position of its nasal openings, a much reduced premolar region, and very small frontal teeth. Kretzoi proposed that the new genus should be named Sharamynodon.

In 1954, Vera Gromova rejected Kretzoi's Sharamynodon, and continued to regard the fossils as belonging to Amynodon. Chinese paleontologists also ignored the name Sharamynodon, though they were perhaps unaware of Kretzoi's suggestion for the new generic name. Throughout the 20th century, several new amynodont species were named based on Chinese fossils, and referred to Amynodon. Sharamynodon's status as a distinct genus was reinforced first in 1989, in a paper by William P. Wall.

Since the original discoveries in the 1920s, a small number of additional fossils have been referred to S. mongoliensis. In 1966, Xu Yu-Xuan described a new maxilla (IVPP V.3216) of "Amynodon" mongoliensis from Ula Usu, close to the original locality. In 2001, Spencer G. Lucas and Robert J. Emry described an incomplete skull (KAN-N2/872) and isolated teeth of S. mongoliensis from Kyzyl Murun in the Kyzulbulak Formation, near the Aktau Mountains in eastern Kazakhstan.

=== Possible additional fossils ===
In 1989, Wall argued that many Late Eocene amynodont species based on Asian fossils, placed in genera such as Amynodon, Lushiamynodon, and Sianodon, actually belonged to Sharamynodon, but that detailed reexaminations of all the Asian fossils was required to determine the taxonomy and true number of species. Lushiamynodon in particular was designated by Wall as a probable synonym of Sharamynodon, since the description of the Lushiamynodon type species (L. menchiapuensis) did not cite any derived genus-level differences from Sharamynodon. Wall also suggested that various Asian species of Amynodon may belong to Sharamynodon, such as the Japanese A. watanabei.

In 2001, Lucas and Emry agreed with Wall's assessment that Lushiamynodon is a synonym of Sharamynodon, and treated both the type species L. menchiapuensis and the Kyrgyzstani species L. kirghisensis as species of Sharamynodon (S. menchiapuensis and S. kirghisensis). Lucas and Emry envisioned Sharamynodon as a genus distributed across East Asia, including China, Mongolia, and Japan, based on fragmentary fossils largely referred to other genera. In 2017, Alexander Averianov, Igor Danilov, Jin Jinhua, and Wang Yingyong supported Lushiamynodon being a synonym of Sharamynodon as likely, but that the validity of Lushiamynodon species beyond the type species (L. menchiapuensis) was problematic due to their fragmentary fossils. Lushiamynodon was also designated a junior synonym of Sharamynodon by Tissier et al. (2018). Not all researchers have agreed; Missiaen (2011) and Bai et al. (2018) continued to list Lushiamynodon as a valid genus, and Wang et al. (2020) considered the Lushiamynodon's validity to be a matter in need of further investigation.

== Description ==
S. mongoliensis was a relatively large animal, similar in appearance and proportions to the North American Amynodon but nearly twice its size at about 1,000 kilograms (2,200 lb). S. mongoliensis stood about 1.4 meters (4.6 ft) tall at the withers, and its trunk was about 1.67 meters (5.5 ft) long.

=== Skull and dentition ===
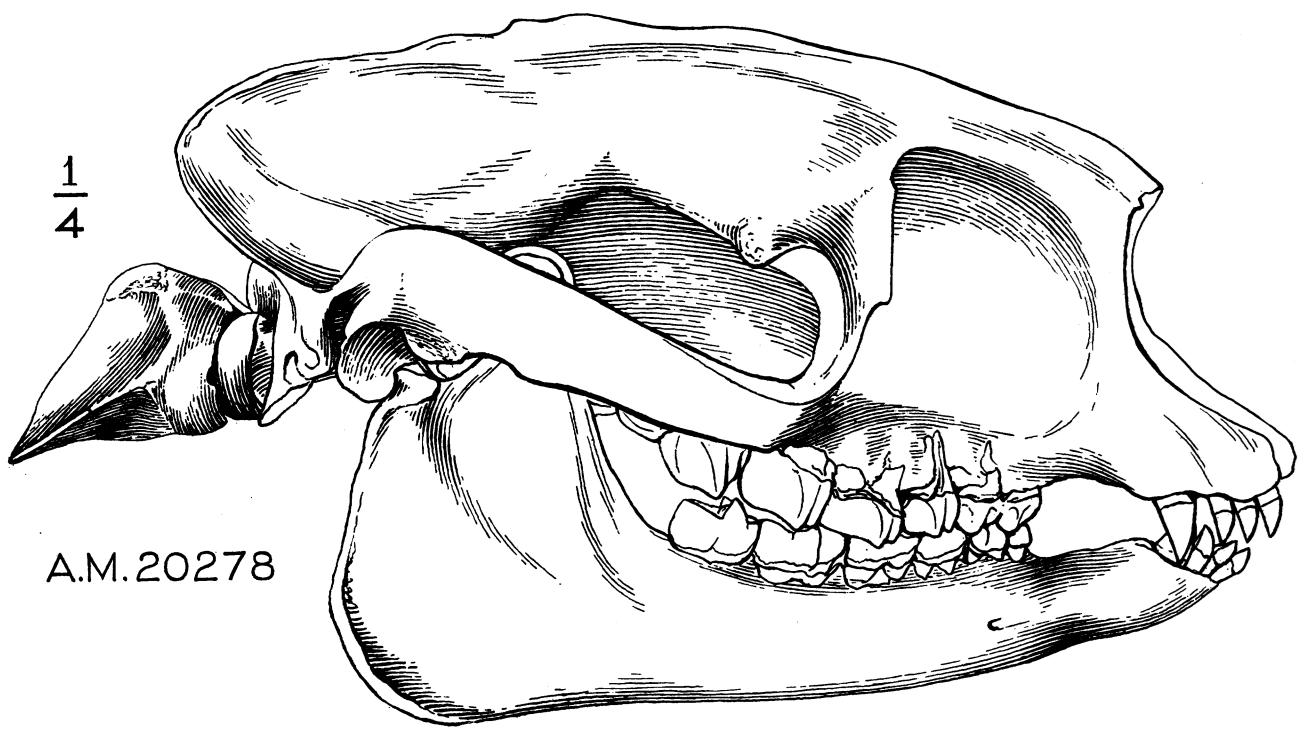
Reconstructed skull of S. mongoliensis

The skull of S. mongoliensis measured 49.5 centimeters (19.5 in) from nasal to occiput, and at least 22.5 centimeters (8.9 in) wide at the widest point of the zygomatic arches. In 1989, Wall diagnosed the skull of Sharamynodon as characterized by unfused and unthickened premaxillae with a reduced ascending process, preorbital fossae (grooves in front of the orbits) that extended slightly medial (to the center of) the orbits, and maxillae that were not part of the border of the external nares.

The most striking feature of the skull of Sharamynodon when compared to more basal amynodonts, such as Amynodon, are the modifications of the snout. The facial region of Sharamynodon is reduced in size when compared to less derived amynodonts, from encompassing about 40% of the length of the skull to 31–34%. This development also resulted in a forward-shift of the position of the eyes; in Sharamynodon, the orbits were positioned right above the second molar. The premaxillae of Sharamynodon were relatively thin, and the diastema (in this case the gap between the canines and premolars) was short, evidence that the external nares had shifted backwards. The evolution of a shortened face in certain amynodonts is believed to have been driven by increasing use of the canines. The nasal incision of Sharamynodon extended back to about the half-way point of the diastema, further back than in more basal amynodonts. The lacrimal bones were more rugose than in more basal amynodonts, which suggests that Sharamynodon had well-developed musculature in its snout. These developments indicate that Sharamynodon had a well-developed and prehensile upper lip, similar to that of rhinoceroses today. Similar developments were even more extreme in some more derived amynodonts, such as Cadurcodon, which is believed to have had an elongated proboscis.

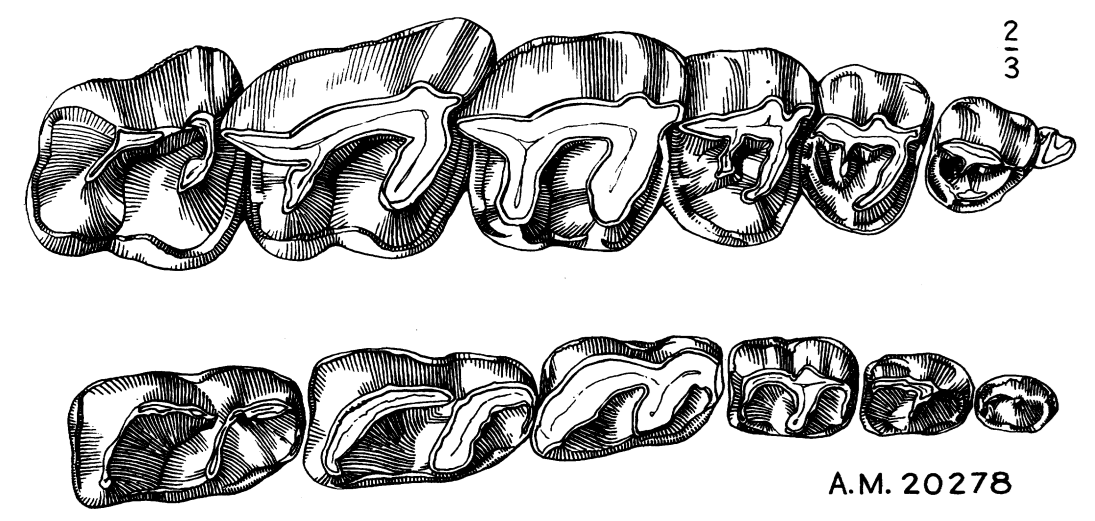
Dentition of S. mongoliensis, from the right upper cheek (top) and the left lower cheek (bottom)

Sharamynodon had the dental formula 3.1.3.33.1.3.3, i.e. both the lower and upper jaws had three pairs of incisors, one pair of canines, three pairs of premolars, and three pairs of molars. Both the incisors and the second pair of premolars were similar to the same teeth in Amynodon. The lower molars of Sharamynodon were relatively narrower compared to those of Amynodon.

== Classification ==
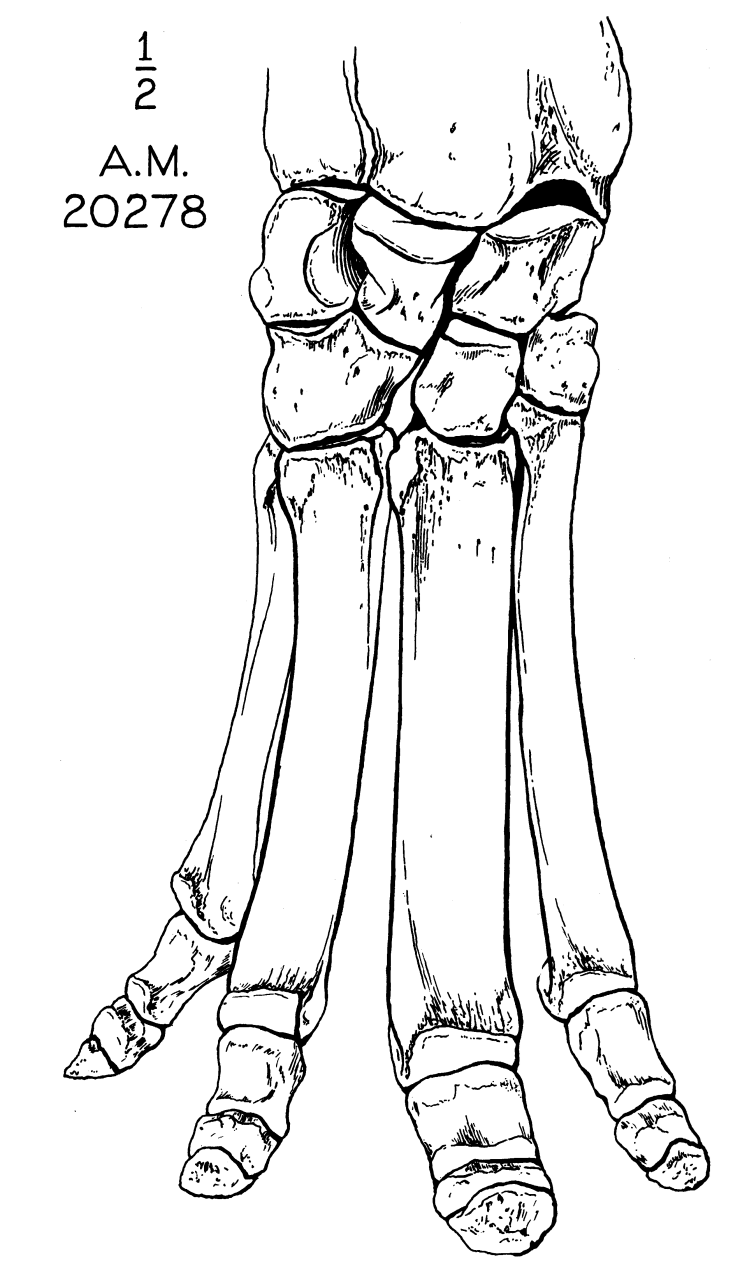
Manus of S. mongoliensis

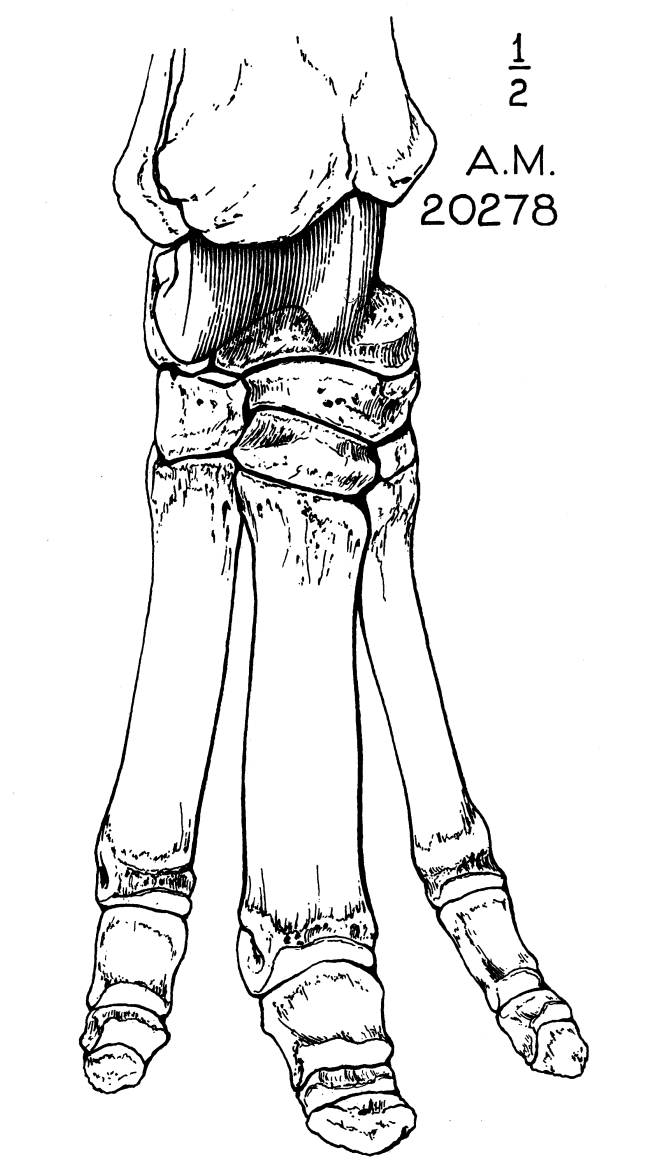
Pes of S. mongoliensis

In 1989, Wall classified Sharamynodon as the most primitive genus in the derived amynodont tribe Cadurcodontini, alongside the genera Amynodontopsis, Cadurcodon, and Sianodon. Modern phylogenetic analyses consistently recover Sharamynodon as a more basal amynodont, outside Cadurcodontini and the other derived amynodont tribe, Metamynodontini, but close to their origin as the sister taxon of both. The phylogenetic position of Sharamynodon is important for the study of amynodont paleobiogeography, since the genus was more derived than the North American Amynodon but less derived than several other North American forms, implying several migration events between Asia and North America.

The cladogram below presents the results of a phylogenetic analysis by Veine-Tonizzo et al. (2023):

- Amynodontidae
  - Rostriamynodon grangeri
  - - Amynodon advenus
    - - Sharamynodon mongoliensis
      - - Metamynodontini
          - - Paramynodon birmanicus
            - Megalamynodon regalis
          - - Sellamynodon zimborensis
            - Metamynodon planifrons
        - Cadurcodontini
          - - Zaisanamynodon protheroi
            - Zaisanamynodon borisovi
          - - - - Amynodontopsis bodei
                - Amynodontopsis jiyuanensis
              - - Cadurcotherium cayluxi
                - Cadurcotherium minus
            - - Cadurcodon bahoensis
              - - Cadurcodon maomingensis
                - - Cadurcodon ardynensis
                  - Cadurcodon kazakademius

== Paleoecology ==
S. mongoliensis is mainly known from the Shara Murun Formation, which preserves the type fauna of the Sharamurunian land mammal age. The S. mongoliensis fossils from the Kyzulbulak Formation in Kazakhstan are slightly earlier in age, from the Irdinmanhan land mammal age. Depending on if other Asian amynodont species are considered to belong to Sharamynodon, and which species are included in the genus, the genus may have appeared earlier and gone extinct later. Lushiamynodon kirghisensis has been argued to be either Irdinmanhan or Ypresian in age. Other fragmentary fossils could extend the range of Sharamynodon to the Ergilian.

The Erlian Basin, in which the Shara Murun Formation is situated, experienced a subtropical and humid climate during the Eocene. The vegetation was highly diverse and dominated by deciduous trees and shrubs. S. mongoliensis was among the largest ungulates of Irdinmanhan Central Asia, alongside brontotheres such as Aktautitan and Protitan. The fauna known from the Shara Murun Formation was similar to the northern Irdin Manha Formation. In addition to Sharamynodon, the Shara Murun fauna included predatory hyaenodonts ("Pterodon" hyaenoides), the brontotheres Parabrontops and Titanodectes, the early paracerathere Pappaceras, the enigmatic mammal Olsenia (described as a mesonychid but now considered to belong to its own family, Olseniidae), deperetellids (Deperetella), primitive ruminants (Archaeomeryx), various rodents, and the fellow amynodonts Cadurcodon and Caenolophus.

The Kyzylbulak Formation preserves fossils from a lacustrine (near a lake) environment, including various mammals, crocodilians, and trionychid turtles. Other than S. mongoliensis, the known mammals include the brontothere Aktautitan, hyracodont Ardynia, rhodopagid Rhodopagus, and a tapiroid similar to Teleolophus.
