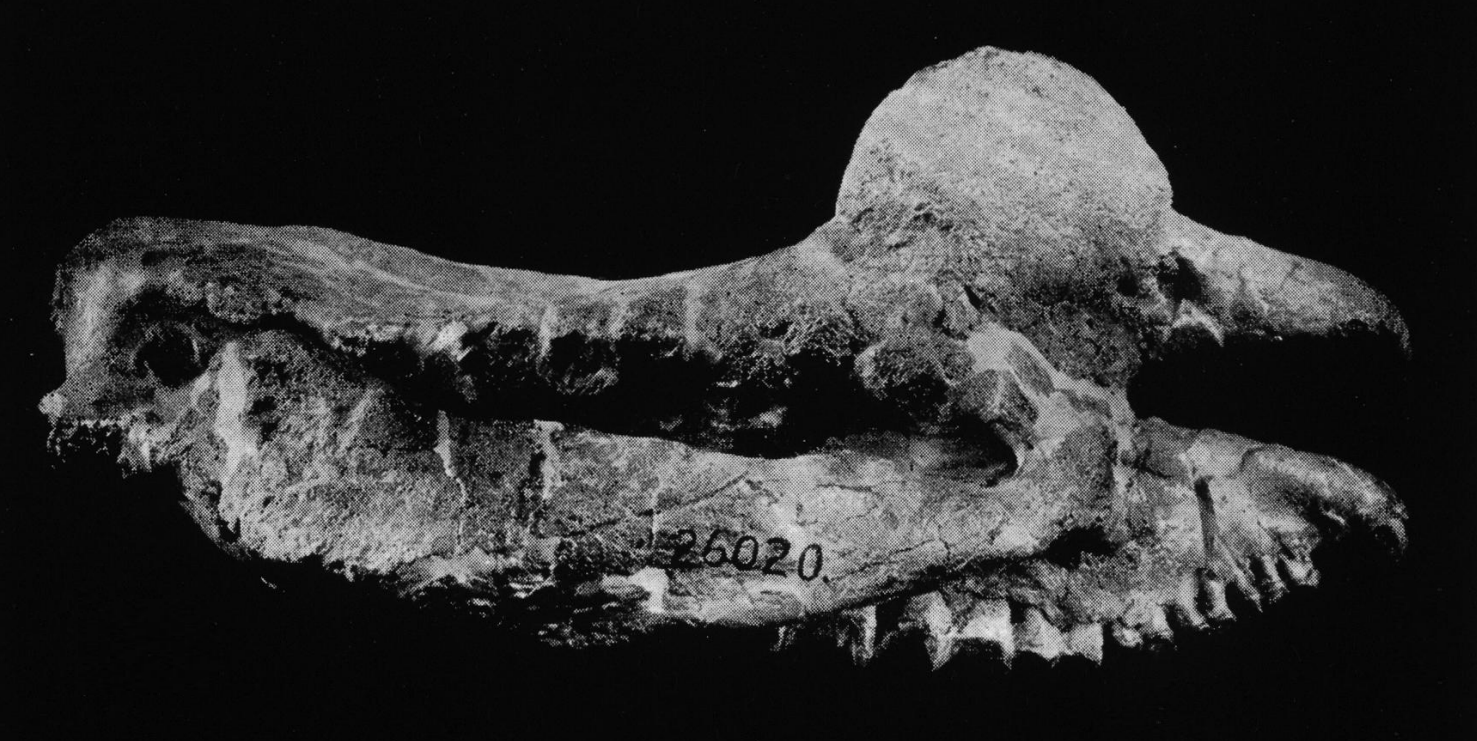
- Skull of P. gobiensis (AMNH 26020)

Scientific classification
- Kingdom: Animalia
- Phylum: Chordata
- Class: Mammalia
- Order: Perissodactyla
- Family: †Brontotheriidae
- Subfamily: †Brontotheriinae
- Tribe: †Brontotheriini
- Subtribe: †Brontotheriina
- Infratribe: †Brontotheriita
- Genus: †Parabrontops; Granger & Gregory, 1943
- Species: †P. gobiensis

Binomial name
- †Parabrontops gobiensis (Osborn, 1925) [originally Brontops]

Synonyms
- Brontops gobiensis Osborn, 1925

= Parabrontops =

Parabrontops Temporal range: Middle–Late Eocene (Sharamurunian–Ulangochuian), 42.7–37.8 Ma

Extinct genus of mammals

Parabrontops (lit. 'beside thunder face', in reference to Brontops (Note: The genus Brontops is now considered a synonym of Megacerops.)) is an extinct genus of horned brontothere that lived in East Asia during the Middle to Late Eocene, in the Sharamurunian and Ulangochuian land mammal ages. The genus contains a single species, P. gobiensis, known from fossils found in the Ergilin Dzo Formation of Mongolia, and in the Urtyn Obo and Shara Murun formations of Inner Mongolia, China.

Parabrontops was a large brontothere, surpassing a tonne in weight, and had two large and bulbous horns in front of its eyes, elliptical in cross-section and pointing upwards. Although Parabrontops was a very derived (advanced) brontothere, it was a basal, perhaps the most basal, brontothere in the infratribe Brontotheriita (the "eubrontotheres"), the lineage that would later lead to genera such as Duchesneodus and Megacerops.

== Research history ==
=== Osborn, Granger, and Gregory's fossils ===
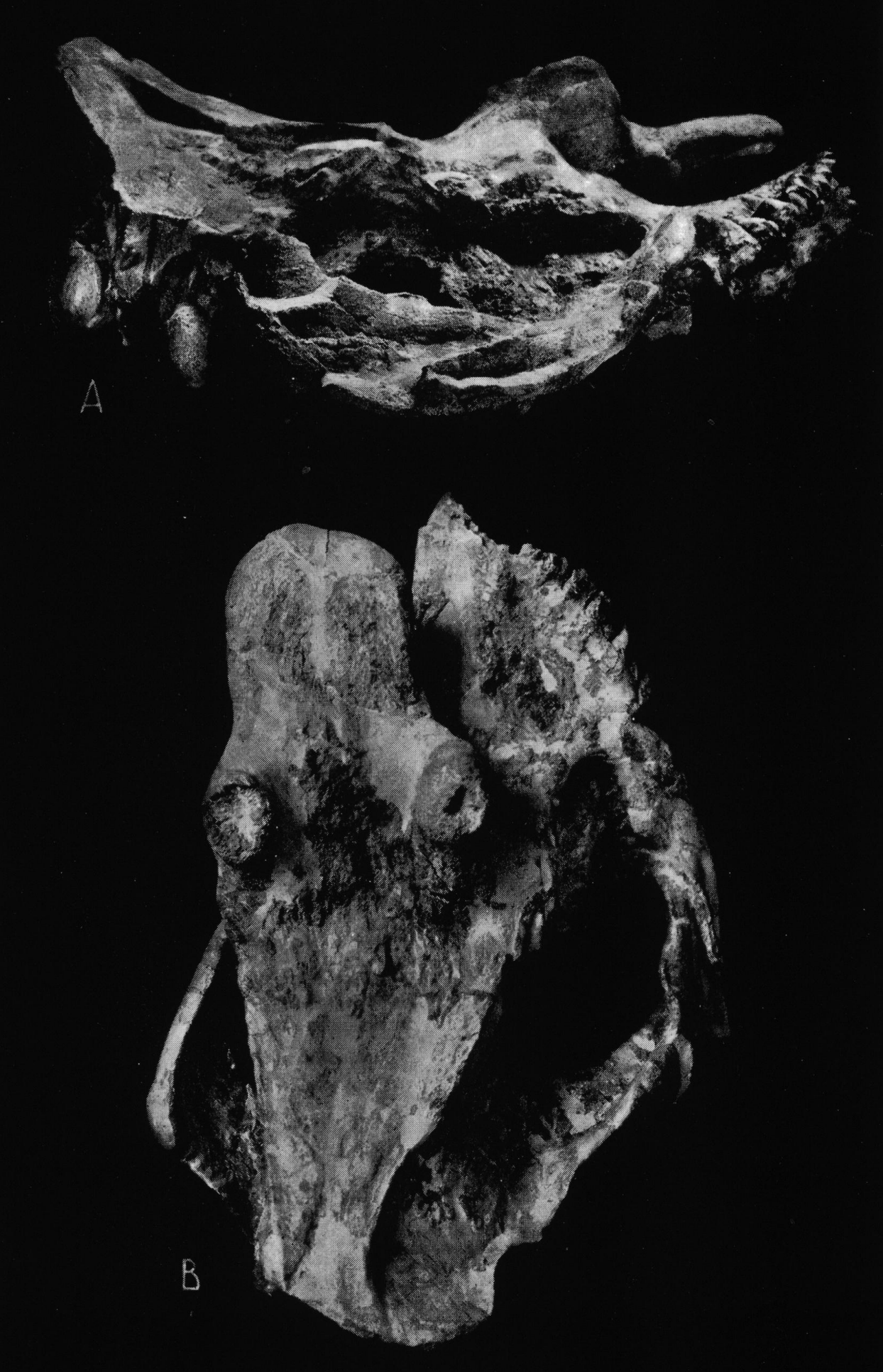
The type skull of P. gobiensis (AMNH 20354)

In 1925, Henry Fairfield Osborn briefly described the new brontothere species Brontops gobiensis, based on a crushed and distorted, but nearly complete skull (AMNH 20354) from the Ardyn Obo Formation (now called the Ergilin Dzo Formation) (Note: Mihlbachler (2008) incorrectly gave the provenance of the type skull as Urtyn Obo in the Urtyn Obo Formation.) of Mongolia. Osborn referred the skull to the North American genus Brontops (now considered a synonym of Megacerops), and described and figured the skull in large part based on his Brontops-based interpretation of how it would have looked if it was undistorted. Because of this, Osborn's measurements and figures of B. gobiensis are not considered to be reliable. Osborn was inconsistent in his approach to brontothere taxonomy. Whereas Osborn oversplit North American brontotheres into an unrealistically large number of species and genera, he often referred newly discovered and often quite distinct Asian brontotheres to known North American genera.

Walter W. Granger and William King Gregory moved B. gobiensis to the new genus Parabrontops in 1943. Granger and Gregory referred additional fossils to the P. gobiensis, including another skull (AMNH 26020) from the Urtyn Obo Formation, a lower jaw (AMNH 26019) from the Urtyn Obo Formation, and another lower jaw (AMNH 26131) from the Shara Murun Formation. Based on the new fossils, they believed Parabrontops to be more closely related to Metatitan than to Brontops (i.e. Megacerops), a conclusion not supported by modern phylogenetic analyses, and distinguished the new genus mainly by its much more robust horns, particularly those of the new skull AMNH 26020.

In a 2008 monograph on brontotheres, Matthew C. Mihlbachler noted that the assignment of the lower jaws AMNH 26019 and AMNH 26131 to P. gobiensis (or Parabrontops) was not certain, since they were not found associated with any skulls. Because the features of these jaws rule out classification in most of the other Asian brontothere genera in a similar size range (such as Metatitan, Protitan, and Rhinotitan), Mihlbachler nevertheless maintained their classification as cf. Parabrontops gobiensis. Bai et al. (2025) classified the jaws as Parabrontops cf. gobiensis. Mihlbachler also suggested that a brontothere jaw (AMNH 26021) from the Ulan Gochu Formation might belong to P. gobiensis; this jaw was referred to Titanodectes minor by Granger and Gregory.

=== Formerly referred specimens ===
In 1959, Zhou Mingzhen and Hu Chengzhi described the new species Parabrontops lunanensis, based on a fossil skull from Lunan, Yunnan, China. P. lunanensis was later moved to the distinct genus Dianotitan by Zhou and colleagues in 1974.

In 1961, Hu referred upper molars (IVPP V.2490) from the Hami Basin in Xinjiang, China to Parabrontops. Mihlbachler (2008) determined that these fossils did not preserve any diagnostic features that would allow identification with Parabrontops.

In 1980, Nataliia Mikhailovna Yanovskaya referred a brontothere skull from the Ergilin Dzo Formation (PIN 3109-39) to P. gobiensis. PIN 3109-39 has two pairs of upper incisors (rather than three, as in the other skulls) and was determined by Mihlbachler (2008) to not belong to Parabrontops. Mihlbachler instead referred PIN 3109-39 to Eubrontotherium clarnoensis.

== Description ==
Parabrontops was a large brontothere. AMNH 20354, the larger of the two skulls, was measured as 576 millimetres (22.7 in) long by Granger and Gregory, and 600 millimetres (24 in) long by Mihlbachler. In 2023, Oscar Sanisidro, Mihlbachler, and Juan L. Cantalapiedra estimated P. gobiensis to have weighed 1,264.5 kilograms (2,788 lb).

=== Skull ===
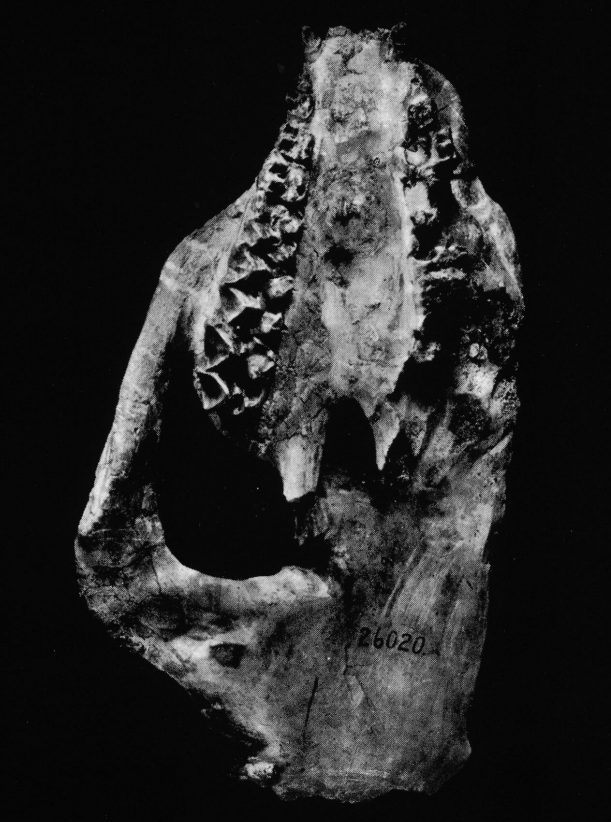
Ventral view of AMNH 26020

Neither of the two known P. gobiensis skulls are perfectly preserved. The upper surface of AMNH 26020 is not complete, and AMNH 20354 is crushed. Despite its distortion, AMNH 20354 indicates that Parabrontops had a shallow, saddle-shaped skull. The zygomatic arches were straight, thick, and rectangular in cross-section. There were no conspicuous swellings on the zygomatic arches, an otherwise common trait in large brontotheres. The only other "eubrontotheres" (the brontotheres part of the infratribe Brontotheriita) to lack such swellings are Eubrontotherium and Parvicornus. The nasal process of Parabrontops was horizontal and unelevated, and very thick. The tip of the nasal process was downturned and strongly rounded. The premaxillomaxillary rostrum (the part of the jaw extending below the nasal incision) was thinned towards its front end and curved slightly upwards.

Parabrontops had a pair of massive horns, positioned directly above the orbits, relatively low on the skull. The horns were evidently variable, since those of AMNH 26020 are much more massive than those of AMNH 20354. The horns of both skulls are elliptical in cross-section, though those of AMNH 20354 are more elliptical than those of AMNH 26020. In AMNH 26020, the frontonasal bones also appear to be more fused. In both skulls, the horns point essentially directly upwards. The endpoints of the horns of AMNH 20354 are roughened, and each horn has a large pit at their apices. Such pits are not seen in AMNH 26020, and may be the result of damage or be some sort of preservational artifact. In AMNH 20354, the entire surface of the horns, not just the endpoints, is roughened.

The nasal incision of Parabrontops was relatively shallow, extending back to the anterior margin (frontmost part) of the fourth upper premolar. The anterior rim of the orbit (eye socket) was above the first upper molar and the fourth upper premolar. The sides of the skull had parasagittal ridges (ridges running lengthwise along the skull), though the degree to which they constricted the skull's upper surface is difficult to tell due to the state of the known skulls. The occiput is preserved only in AMNH 20354, where it is preserved only partially, and cannot be described in any detail.

=== Dentition ===
P. gobiensis had the upper dental formula 3.1.4.3. Neither of the two skulls preserve the incisors, though the alveoli (tooth sockets) remain. AMNH 26020 preserves the roots of some of the incisors. The three pairs of upper incisors is an important feature that distinguished Parabrontops from the closely related Eubrontotherium and Parvicornus, both of which had only two pairs. The upper incisors were narrowly spaced and positioned in a nearly straight row slightly in front of the upper canines. There was no diastema (gap between teeth) between the upper incisors and canines. The upper canines were very small. There was a short diastema between the canines and the upper premolars. The only somewhat well-preserved upper cheek teeth of P. gobiensis is the right row of cheek teeth of AMNH 26020. The first upper premolar had a complex morphology and was about as broad as it was long, and smaller than the other premolars. The other premolars were almost rectangular in shape. The second premolar had a distinct metacone (one of the cusps), and the third and fourth had distinct hypocones (another cusp). The upper molars were typical of derived brontotheres; they had tall ectolophs (one of the ridges across the tooth), with labial (towards the lips) walls angled towards the tongue.

If AMNH 26019 and AMNH 26131 are accepted as P. gobiensis lower jaws, P. gobiensis had the lower dental formula 3.1.4.3. These jaws have three pairs of small lower incisors, lined up in a nearly straight row between the lower canines. The second pair of lower incisors were larger than the first and third pair. There were no gaps between the incisors, nor a diastema between the lower incisors and the canines. The lower canines were moderately sized, and there was a diastema between them and the premolars, about as long as the length of the second lower premolar. Of the lower premolars, the third and fourth had large metaconids (another cusp). The trigonid (shearing part) of the second lower premolar was much longer than the tooth's talonid (crushing part). The lower molars were typical of advanced brontotheres and not notably different from those of close relatives of Parabrontops.

== Classification ==
In 1943, Granger and Gregory classified Parabrontops in the brontothere subfamily "Epimanteoceratinae", and as a descendant of Rhinotitan. In 1997, Malcolm McKenna and Susan K. Bell placed Metatitan (alongside both Rhinotitan and Epimanteoceras) in the subfamily "Brontopinae". Mihlbachler established a new internal taxonomy of brontotheres in his 2008 monograph. In Mihlbachler's 2008 phylogenetic analysis, and in subsequent analyses, Parabrontops has been recovered as a basal member of the infratribe Brontotheriita ("eubrontotheres"), in the subtribe Brontotheriina (the horned brontotheres).

The cladograms below shows the primary strict reduced consensus tree from Mihlbachler's 2008 analysis, collapsed to show only Brontotheriita, and the reduced strict consensus from a 2021 analysis by Mihlbachler and Donald Prothero:

Topology A: Mihlbachler (2008)

- Brontotheriita
  - Parabrontops gobiensis
  - Protitanops curryi
  - - Eubrontotherium clarnoensis
    - - Dianotitan lunanensis
      - Duchesneodus uintensis
      - - Megacerops coloradensis
        - Megacerops kuwagatarhinus

Topology B: Mihlbachler & Prothero (2021)

- Brontotheriita
  - Parabrontops gobiensis
  - - Parvicornus occidentalis
    - - Eubrontotherium clarnoensis
      - - Protitanops curryi
        - - Dianotitan lunanensis
          - - Duchesneodus uintensis
            - - Megacerops kuwagatarhinus
              - Megacerops coloradensis

== Paleoecology ==
The Urtyn Obo and Shara Murun formations are both stratigraphic levels found in the Erlian Basin. During the Eocene, the Erlian Basin experienced a subtropical and humid climate. The vegetation was highly diverse and dominated by deciduous trees and shrubs. The Ergilin Dzo Formation was similarly deposited under warm and humid conditions. Sedimentary analyses suggest that the Ergilin Dzo Formation was a floodplain environment with a braided stream network formed by fluvial systems.

Parabrontops would have coexisted with several other brontotheres, including Rhinotitan and Titanodectes in the Sharamurunian, and Embolotherium, Nasamplus, and Titanodectes in the Ulangochuian. Other taxa known from both land mammal ages include the amynodont Cadurcodon, entelodont Brachyhyops, paracerathere Juxia, and the large mesonychid Mongolestes. Other amynodonts are also known from the Shara Murun, such as Sharamynodon, as are various rhinocerotoids (such as Pappaceras and Triplopus) and tapiroids (Deperetella). The Shara Murun Formation also preserves fossils of primitive ruminants (Lophiomeryx) and hyaenodonts ("Pterodon" hyaenoides). In the Ulangochuian-age Ulan Gochu Formation, amynodonts were also represented by Amynodontopsis and Zaisanamynodon, paraceratheres by Urtinotherium, and hyaenodonts by Hyaenodon.
