= Lushiamynodon =

Lushiamynodon Temporal range: Middle–Late Eocene (Irdinmanhan–Sharamurunian), 47.8–39.9 Ma Possible Ypresian record
- Drawing of the L. menchiapuensis type specimen (IVPP V.3016)

Scientific classification
- Kingdom: Animalia
- Phylum: Chordata
- Class: Mammalia
- Order: Perissodactyla
- Superfamily: Rhinocerotoidea
- Family: †Amynodontidae
- Genus: †Lushiamynodon; Zhou & Xu, 1965

Type species
- †Lushiamynodon menchiapuensis Zhou & Xu, 1965

Other species
- †L. kirghisensis? Belyaeva, 1971; †L. obesus? Zhou & Xu, 1965; †L. sharamurenensis? Xu, 1966; †L. wuchengensis? Wang, 1978

Synonyms
- Genus synonymy: Andarakodon Averianov & Potapova, 1996; Synonyms of L. kirghisensis: Andarakodon kirghisensis (Belyaeva, 1971); Andarakodon kirghisiensis Averianov & Potapova, 1996 (lapsus calami); Sharamynodon kirghisensis (Belyaeva, 1971); Synonyms of L. menchiapuensis: Sharamynodon menchiapuensis (Zhou & Xu, 1965)

Extinct genus of mammals

Lushiamynodon ("Lushi Amynodon") is an extinct genus of amynodont that lived in Central and East Asia during the Middle to Late Eocene, in the Irdinmanhan and Sharamurunian land mammal ages. Five species of Lushiamynodon have been described, based mostly on fragmentary fossils found at different localities in China. Lushiamynodon was a largely unspecialized and moderately-sized to large amynodont, smaller in size than the contemporary and closely related Sharamynodon.

The type species of Lushiamynodon, L. menchiapuensis, has been argued to belong to Sharamynodon, which would make Lushiamynodon a junior synonym. The validity of the genus remains a matter in need of further investigation, and Lushiamynodon continues to be used by some researchers. The species L. kirghisensis extends the known range of Lushiamynodon to Kyrgyzstan. The fossils of L. kirghisensis have been argued to be Ypresian in age, which if true would make L. kirghisensis the earliest known amynodont, though this dating is controversial.

== Research history ==
Drawing of the L. wuchengensis type specimen (IVPP V.5305)

Lushiamynodon was described by Zhou Mingzhen and Xu Yu-Xuan in 1965. Zhou and Xu described two species: the type species L. menchiapuensis, and L. obesus. L. menchiapuensis was based on a left maxilla with some of the teeth preserved (IVPP V.3016) and another fragmentary left maxilla (IVPP V.3017), from the lower part of the Late Eocene Lushi Formation, found near the village of Menchiapu in Lushi, Henan, China. The second species L. obesus was based on a partial skull and palate, with a few teeth preserved (IVPP V.3023), found in the Late Eocene red sandstone beds of Tungchang, a village in Xichuan County in northern Henan. These beds probably correspond in time to the Yuanchü Formation. Zhou and Xu distinguished the new genus from "Amynodon" sinensis and Sianodon bahoensis mainly based on features of the teeth.

In 1966, Xu described a third species of Lushiamynodon, L. sharamurenensis, based on fossils found in the Shara Murun Formation, at Ula Usa in Inner Mongolia. L. sharamurenensis was based on a partial skull from a juvenile individual (IVPP V.2892), a mandible from a juvenile individual (IVPP V.2892.1), another partial skull (IVPP V.2892.2), and some postcranial fossils. Xu also referred a partial mandible (IVPP V.3217) from "Ulan Shireh Obo", a site about 30 kilometers northeast of Ula Usa and presumably also from the Shara Murun Formation, to L. sharamurenensis.

In 1971, Elizaveta Belyaeva named the new species L.? kirghisensis, based on a fragmentary maxilla (PIN 1996/2) and some isolated upper teeth from the Alay Formation at Andarak, Kyrgyzstan. In 1996, Alexander Averianov and Olga Potapova described new fossils of L. kirghisensis from Andarak, including both maxillae from a single individual (ZIN 34313) and a fragmentary premolar (ZIN 34021).

Another species, L. wuchengensis, was described in 1978 by Wang Jingwen, based on a fragmentary maxilla (IVPP V.5305) from Xixia in Henan, China. Wang referred the new species to Lushiamynodon due to similarities with the type species, and differences in regard to Sianodon honanensis, also found in Henan.

== Description ==
Lushiamynodon was a moderately-sized to large amynodont, smaller in size than the contemporary Sharamynodon mongoliensis. The dentition of Lushiamynodon suggests that it was a largely unspecialized amynodont. The skull of Lushiamynodon was characterized by a strong sagittal crest, and stout zygomatic arches.

Dentally, Lushiamynodon was characterized by comparatively large and molarized fourth premolars, with prominent paracone and metacone styles, and a metaloph extending far lingually and connected to the posterior of the protocone, which was slightly constricted. The molars were not quite hypsodont (high-crowned). The second molar was elongated, and had a convex external wall, and the third molar narrowed posteriorly and had a metaloph that appeared to be confluent with the ectoloph.

== Classification ==
Zhou and Xu did not classify Lushiamynodon beyond noting that it appeared to be an unspecialized amynodont. In 1989, William P. Wall classified Lushiamynodon and Sharamynodon as primitive members of the amynodont tribe Cadurcodontini. Later phylogenetic analyses have recovered Sharamynodon as a more basal amynodont, outside Cadurcodontini. Lushiamynodon has tended to be excluded from phylogenetic analyses due to the fragmentary fossil material.

=== Possible synonymy with Sharamynodon ===
In 1989, Wall proposed that many amynodont species based on Asian fossils, placed in genera such as Amynodon, Lushiamynodon, and Sianodon, actually represented fossils of Sharamynodon, but that detailed reexaminations of all Asian fossils was required to determine the true taxonomy and number of species. Wall designated Lushiamynodon as a probable synonym of Sharamynodon, noting that the description of L. menchiapuensis did not cite any derived features separating the two genera.

In 1996, Averianov and Potapova proposed that L. kirghisensis belonged to the amynodont tribe Metamynodontini, distantly related to L. menchiapuensis, and erected the distinct genus Andarakodon to contain the species. The metamynodontin classification was supported by the forwards position of the infraorbital foramen and the more backwards beginning of the zygomatic arch. In 2001, Spencer G. Lucas and Robert J. Emry rejected Averianov and Potapova's Andarakodon and instead found the original assignment of L. kirghisensis to Lushiamynodon to be correct. Lucas and Emry also agreed with Wall that Lushiamynodon was likely a synonym of Sharamynodon, and thus treated both L. kirghisensis and L. menchiapuensis as species of that genus (as S. kirghisensis and S. menchiapuensis).

In 2005, Averianov and Marc Godinot accepted the synonymy of Andarakodon and Sharamynodon, but maintained that the proposed earlier age of Andarak was a serious possibility. Lushiamynodon being a synonym of Sharamynodon was also accepted as likely in 2017 by Averianov, Igor Danilov, Jin Jinhua, and Wang Yingyong. Averianov et al. (2017) noted that the validity of Lushiamynodon species other than L. menchiapuensis was problematic, since they are based on fragmentary remains. In 2011, Peter Missiaen continued to list Lushiamynodon as a valid genus. In 2018, Lushiamynodon was also designated a junior synonym of Sharamynodon by Jérémy Tissier et al. Bai et al. (2018) and Bai et al. (2020) however used Lushiamynodon as a valid genus without elaboration, and Wang et al. (2020) considered Lushiamynodon's validity to be a matter in need of further investigation.

== Paleoecology ==
L. menchiapuensis and the Lushi Formation date to the Irdinmanhan land mammal age. The Shara Murun Formation, from which L. sharamurensis is known, preserves the type fauna of the later Sharamurunian land mammal age. The temporal range of L. kirghisensis is disputed. In 1993, the age of the fossils at Andarak were reassessed as Ypresian (i.e. Early Eocene) based on chondrichtyan fossils, which if true would make L. kirghisensis one of the oldest known amynodonts. In 2001, Lucas and Emry rejected an Ypresian age for Andarak (and thus also L. kirghisensis), noting the presence of several groups otherwise known only from the Irdinmanhan at the site, and argued that reassigning its age based on the chondrichtyan fauna was dubious since it was based on correlations with stratigraphy in Europe. Averianov and colleagues have maintained that the earlier Ypresian date is possible.

The faunas of the Lushi Formation are divided into the Upper and Lower Lushi Faunas; L. menchiapuensis belongs to the Upper Lushi Fauna. This diverse fauna encompasses numerous other perissodactyls, including the fellow amynodonts Sianodon and Caenolophus, as well as lophialetids, hyracodonts, paraceratheres, brontotheres, deperetellids, helaletids, and chalicotherioids. Several carnivorans are known, including the amphicyonid Cynodictis, miacid Miacis, and nimravid Eusmilus. Additional taxa recorded include artiodactyls such as Andrewsarchus, Dichobune, Gobiohyus, and possibly Anthracotherium, the pantodont Eudinoceras, the mesonychids Honanodon and Lohoodon, the hyaenodonts Hyaenodon and Propterodon, the primate Lushius, lagomorphs, rodents, and tillodonts.

The Andarak mammal fauna of the Alay Formation was deposited in a marine bed, and is found together with fossils of fishes and invertebrates. Land mammal fossils are thus remains of animals washed out into the Tethys Ocean. The mammals probably lived near the Tethys coast, in a forested and humid environment. The mammal fossils from Andarak are understudied, but include the several fellow perissodactyls, including anthracobunids, chalicotherioids or equoids, deperetellids, rhodopagids, lophialetids, and paraceratheres. Artiodactyls were represented by diacodexeids. Also known from Andarak are the hyaenodont Neoparapterodon, indeterminate mesonychids, and various groups of small mammals, including proteutherians or lipotyphlans, micropternodontids, mixodontians, lagomorphs, and rodents.
