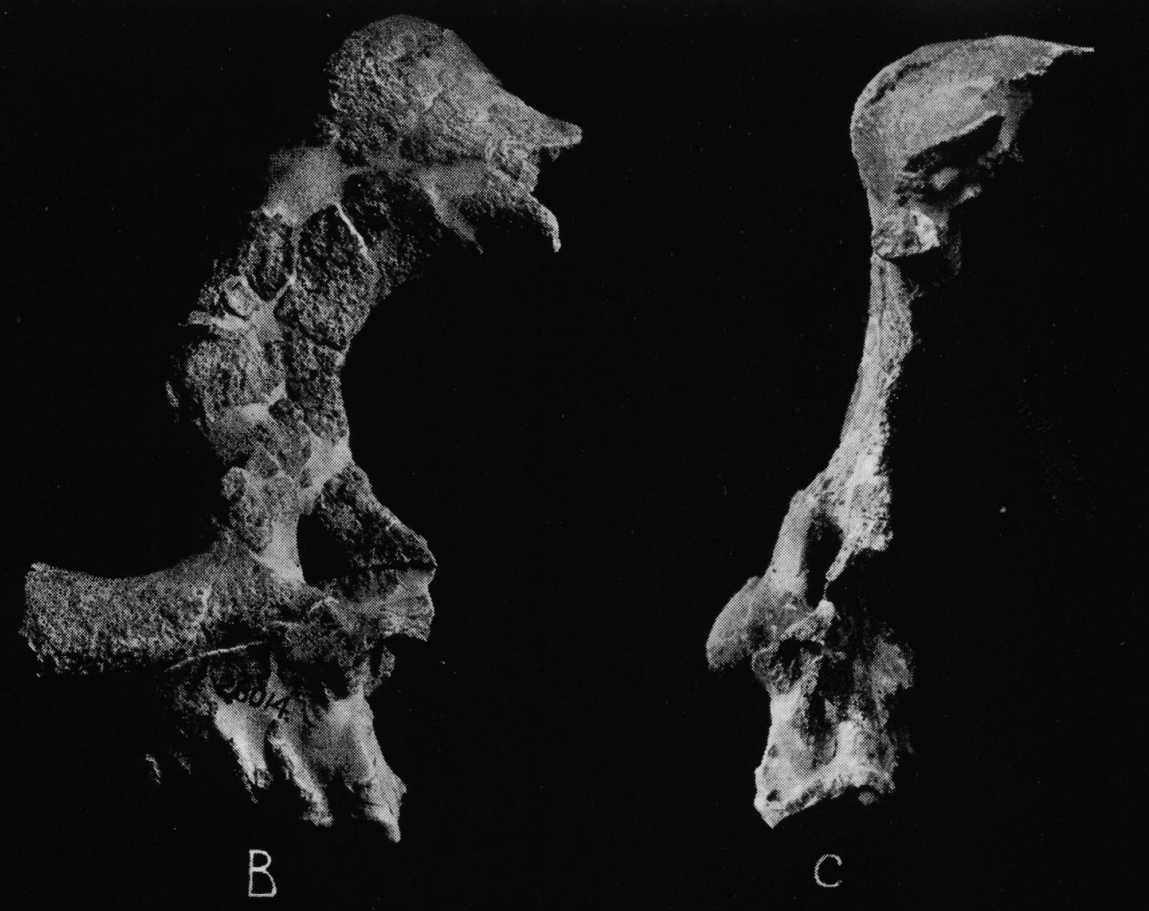
- Type specimen of N. progressus (AMNH 26014)

Scientific classification
- Kingdom: Animalia
- Phylum: Chordata
- Class: Mammalia
- Order: Perissodactyla
- Family: †Brontotheriidae
- Subfamily: †Brontotheriinae
- Tribe: †Brontotheriini
- Subtribe: †Brontotheriina
- Infratribe: †Embolotheriita
- Genus: †Nasamplus; Mihlbachler, 2008
- Species: †N. progressus

Binomial name
- †Nasamplus progressus (Granger & Gregory, 1943) [originally Metatitan]

Synonyms
- Metatitan progressus Granger & Gregory, 1943; Protitan robustus? Granger & Gregory, 1943; Epimanteoceras amplus? Yanovskaya, 1976

= Nasamplus =

Nasamplus Temporal range: Late Eocene (Ulangochuian), 39.9–37.8 Ma Possible Irdinmanhan and Ergilian records

Extinct genus of mammals

Nasamplus (lit. 'large nose') is an extinct genus of horned brontothere that lived in East Asia during the Late Eocene, in the Ulangochuian land mammal age. The genus contains a single species, N. progressus, known from a fragmentary skull found in the Ulan Gochu Formation of Inner Mongolia, China.

Nasamplus was a large brontothere, perhaps similar in size to the contemporary Embolotherium. Nasamplus had short but prominent and sideways-pointing horns that were fused into a raised crest. The crest of Nasamplus is interpreted as a transitional predecessor structure to the larger and elongated "rams" seen in Embolotherium and Protembolotherium.

== Research history ==
=== Type specimen ===
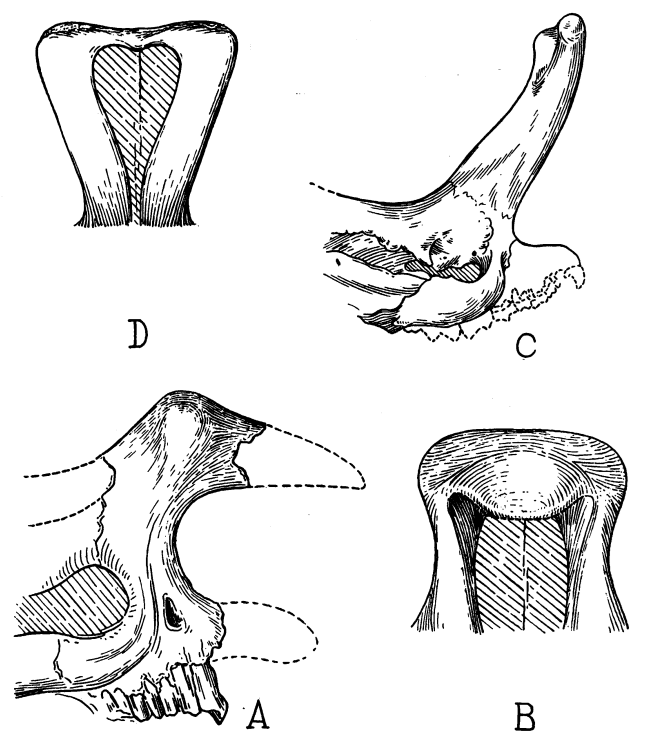
Comparison of the nasal and horn regions of Nasamplus progressus (A, B) and Embolotherium andrewsi (C, D). The fossils are not drawn to scale.

In 1943, Walter W. Granger and William King Gregory described the new brontothere species Metatitan progressus, based on the fragmentary skull AMNH 26014, found at Jhama Obo in the Ulan Gochu Formation in Inner Mongolia, China. AMNH 26014 preserves the right side of the frontal part of the skull, including highly unique horn and nasal morphology. Granger and Gregory only briefly described the fossil, and noted that M. progressus was similar to Metatitan relictus, so much so they believed that M. progressus and M. relictus may one day be connected via intergrading specimens. M. progressus was further noted for its unique horns, united by a connecting crest. Granger and Gregory noted that this appeared to be similar to the inferred predecessor structure of the large ram-like structure seen in the Embolotherium, though they did not believe Embolotherium to have descended from Metatitan.

In 2004, Matthew C. Mihlbachler, Spencer G. Lucas, Robert J. Emry, and Bolat Bayshashov recovered Metatitan as paraphyletic in a phylogenetic analysis, with M. progressus placed much closer to Embolotherium than to the other species. Mihlbachler, Lucas, Emry, and Bayshashov supported Granger and Gregory's idea that the ram of Embolotherium was anatomically derived in a way similar to the crest of M. progressus, proposing that M. progressus was one of several transitional forms between animals such as Metatitan and Embolotherium.

Mihlbachler moved M. progressus to the new genus Nasamplus in a 2008 monograph on brontotheres. The new genus was justified through the unique combination of fused horns into a crest (possibly a primitive ram), as in Embolotherium and Protembolotherium, and an elevated and horizontal nasal process, as in Aktautitan and Metatitan. The genus name Nasamplus means "large nose", derived from the Latin nasus ("nose") and amplus ("large"), referring to the large nasal cavity that Nasamplus would have had in life due to its elevated nasal process.

=== Possible additional fossils ===
In his 2008 monograph, Mihlbachler suggested that Epimanteoceras amplus, a species described by Nataliia Mikhailovna Yanovskaya in 1976, could be a synonym of N. progressus. E. amplus is based on PIN 3109-41, a relatively well-preserved but crushed skull with an associated mandible, found in the Ergilin Dzo Formation of Mongolia. Mihlbachler determined that these fossils did not belong to Epimanteoceras, but rather to a brontothere similar to Embolotherium and Protembolotherium. PIN 3109-41 does not preserve the portions of the skull where the diagnostic features of Nasamplus are located, which makes it impossible to determine whether it represents N. progressus or if it is a distinct brontothere.

In 2022, Takehisa Tsubamoto, Khishigjav Tsogtbaatar, Tsogtbaatar Chinzorig, and Naoko Egi proposed that Protitan robustus, a species named by Granger and Gregory based on a lower jaw from the Irdin Manha Formation, could be a synonym of N. progressus. Mihlbachler treated Protitan robustus as a synonym of Protitan grangeri; Protitan robustus has previously also been suggested to alternatively belong to the genus Epimanteoceras.

== Description ==
Nasamplus was a large brontothere. Because of the poor fossil material, the size of Nasamplus is difficult to estimate. Granger & Gregory (1943) published no measurements of AMNH 26014. The only measurement published by Mihlbachler (2008) was the dimensions of the fourth premolar tooth, 4.8 centimeters (1.9 in) long and 6.05 centimeters (2.38 in) wide, in the size range of the same tooth in Embolotherium. In 2023, Oscar Sanisidro, Mihlbachler, and Juan L. Cantalapiedra estimated N. progressus to have weighed 4,260 kilograms (9,390 lb), their highest estimate for any brontothere. This estimate is not reliable, since it was based on the size of the first upper molar, which is extremely worn in AMNH 26014.

=== Skull ===
Nasamplus is distinguished by its fused horns, which were anatomically similar to, but nearly as developed as, the rams of Embolotherium and Protembolotherium. Nasamplus is distinguished from these ram-bearing genera by the retention of a large and elevated nasal process. Both the crest and the nasal process were elevated high above the orbits (eye sockets); the nasal process of Nasamplus was more elevated than those of the related Aktautitan and Metatitan. Little can be said of the nasal process itself since most of it is unpreserved.

The horns of Nasamplus were short and directed upwards and outwards. Unlike the horned brontothere ancestral condition of paired horns, the horns of Nasamplus were completely fused together into a short and elevated crest, which stretched across the snout. The fused horns of Nasamplus are probably similar to the structures that gave rise to the rams of Embolotherium and Protembolotherium. The crest was slightly arched and had a roughened surface.

The nasal incision of Nasamplus was deep and extended backwards to the anterior margin (frontmost part) of the first upper molar. The anterior rim of the orbit was above the posterior (back) portion of the first upper molar.

=== Dentition ===
Only two of the teeth are preserved in AMNH 26014, the first upper molar and the fourth upper premolar, and both teeth are heavily worn. The fourth upper premolar was more or less rectangular in shape and had a distinct hypocone (one of the major cusps).

== Classification ==
In 1943, Granger and Gregory classified Metatitan (including M. progressus, i.e. Nasamplus) in the brontothere subfamily "Epimanteoceratinae", and as a descendant of Rhinotitan. In 1997, Malcolm McKenna and Susan K. Bell placed Metatitan (alongside both Rhinotitan and Epimanteoceras) in the subfamily "Brontopinae". Mihlbachler established a new internal taxonomy of brontotheres in his 2008 monograph, and recovered Nasamplus as part of a clade of horned brontotheres related to Embolotherium. This clade was named as the infratribe Embolotheriita, classified as part of the subtribe Brontotheriina (the horned brontotheres). Embolotheriita (or the "embolotheres") are characterized by an elevated nasal process with thin and deep lateral (side) walls, as well as narrowly spaced or fused horns.

The cladogram below shows the primary strict reduced consensus tree from Mihlbachler's 2008 analysis, collapsed to show only Brontotheriina:

- Brontotheriina
  - Protitan grangeri
  - Protitan minor
  - - Protitanotherium emarginatum
    - - - Rhinotitan kaiseni
        - Rhinotitan andrewsi
      - - Pachytitan ajax
        - Diplacodon elatus
        - Brontotheriita
          ⊞
          - Parabrontops gobiensis
          - Protitanops curryi
          - - Eubrontotherium clarnoensis
            - - Dianotitan lunanensis
              - Duchesneodus uintensis
              - - Megacerops coloradensis
                - Megacerops kuwagatarhinus
          ⊟
      - Embolotheriita
        - - Aktautitan hippopotamopus
          - - Pollyosbornia altidens
            - Gnathotitan berkeyi
        - - Pygmaetitan panxianensis
          - - Brachydiastematherium transylvanicum
            - Metatitan khaitshinus
            - - Metatitan primus
              - Metatitan relictus
          - - Nasamplus progressus
            - - Protembolotherium efremovi
              - - Embolotherium andrewsi
                - Embolotherium grangeri

== Paleoecology ==
The Ulan Gochu Formation is a stratigraphic unit in the Erlian Basin, which experienced experienced a subtropical and humid climate during the Eocene. The vegetation was highly diverse and dominated by deciduous trees and shrubs. In the Middle and Late Eocene, perissodactyls were a dominant group in East Asia, particularly brontotheres and amynodonts. In addition to Nasamplus, the Ulan Gochu Formation has also yielded fossils of the brontothere genera Embolotherium and Titanodectes. Amynodonts were represented by Amynodontopsis, Cadurcodon, and Zaisanamynodon, and other perissodactyls included paraceratheres (Juxia and Urtinotherium), hyracodonts (Ardynia and Ulanodon), and chalicotheres (Schizotherium). Predators included the hyaenodont Hyaenodon and the mesonychid Mongolestes. Several smaller animals are also known, including lagomorphs, rodents, and various reptiles, such as lizards, snakes, and tortoises.
