= Protitan =

Protitan Temporal range: Middle Eocene (Irdinmanhan), 47.8–42.7 Ma
- Type skull of P. grangeri (AMNH 20103)

Scientific classification
- Kingdom: Animalia
- Phylum: Chordata
- Class: Mammalia
- Order: Perissodactyla
- Family: †Brontotheriidae
- Subfamily: †Brontotheriinae
- Tribe: †Brontotheriini
- Subtribe: †Brontotheriina
- Genus: †Protitan; Granger & Gregory, 1943

Type species
- †Protitanotherium grangeri (original combination) Osborn, 1925

Species
- †P. grangeri (Osborn, 1925); †P. minor Granger & Gregory, 1943; Species pending reassessment: †P. cingulatus Granger & Gregory, 1943; †P. major Huang & Zheng, 2004

Synonyms
- Synonyms of P. grangeri: Protitanotherium grangeri Osborn, 1925; Dolichorhinus olseni Osborn, 1925; Manteoceras irdinensis Osborn, 1925; P. robustus? Granger & Gregory, 1943; P. bellus Granger & Gregory, 1943; P. obliquidens Granger & Gregory, 1943

Extinct genus of mammals

Protitan (lit. 'before titan') is an extinct genus of horned brontothere that lived in East Asia during the Middle Eocene, in the Irdinmanhan land mammal age. Numerous species have been assigned to Protitan historically, though only two are generally recognized today: P. grangeri and P. minor, both known from the Irdin Manha Formation of Inner Mongolia, China. Fossils have also been referred to Protitan from other localities in China and Mongolia, though these are no longer considered diagnostic to the genus.

Protitan was an intermediate-sized to large brontothere; both P. grangeri and P. minor have been estimated to have surpassed a tonne in weight. Protitan had small and elliptical horns. Phylogenetic analyses recover Protitan as the most basal (primitive) known horned brontothere. Protitan closely resembled the slightly more derived North American genus Protitanotherium, but is distinguished by various dental and skull features, most notably that Protitan is the only horned brontothere to retain a ventrally unconstricted external auditory pseudomeatus (one of the ear bones).

== Research history ==
=== Original fossils ===
Bottom view of the type skull of P. grangeri (AMNH 20103)

The first known fossils now considered to belong to Protitan were discovered by the Third Asiatic Expedition of the American Museum of Natural History, in 1922 and 1923, and described by Henry Fairfield Osborn in 1925. Protitan was the first brontothere to be discovered in the highly fossiliferous Erlian Basin, though Osborn described the fossils as a new species of the otherwise North American genus Protitanotherium, P. grangeri. Osborn based the new species on several specimens, including limited postcranial material, from the Irdin Manha Formation of Inner Mongolia, China. The best preserved fossil, a skull (AMNH 20103), was selected as the type specimen. P. grangeri was named in honor of Walter W. Granger, the leader of the Third Asiatic Expedition. Osborn identified P. grangeri as a very primitive horned brontothere, and referred the species to the genus Protitanotherium mainly due to it being of a "stage of evolution similar to that of Protitanotherium emarginatum", the type species of Protitanotherium. Osborn further compared P. grangeri to P. emarginatum in its "elongate horns", "broad, shove-shaped nasals", and the "saddle-shaped cranial top".

Among the various additional brontothere speces described by Osborn in 1925 were Dolichorhinus olseni and Manteoceras irdinensis, both also from the Irdin Manha Formation. Dolichorhinus olseni was based on a pair of jaws (AMNH 20109), which Osborn compared to Dolichorhinus kaiseni (now Rhinotitan), known from the later Shara Murun Formation, and was named after George Olsen, one of the members of the Third Asiatic Expedition. Manteoceras irdinensis, named after the Irdin Manha Formation, was based on a right mandibular ramus with symphysis (AMNH 20111), which Osborn provisionally referred to Manteoceras, though he noted that this was "doubtful and provisional, because the dentition does not agree with that of any known American species of this genus."

=== Creation of the genus ===
Type skull of P. minor (AMNH 26416). The nasal process has been reconstructed as shorter than it would have been in life.

In 1943, Walter W. Granger and William King Gregory revised the taxonomy of the brontotheres known from Mongolia and Inner Mongolia. Granger and Gregory noted several differences between P. grangeri and P. emarginatum, notably that P. grangeri had smaller and less elevated horns, smaller upper canines, more tapering and less truncate nasals, and less reduced upper incisors. These characteristics were interpreted as collectively indicating that P. grangeri was more primitive than P. emarginatum, and Granger and Gregory thus referred the species to a new genus, for which they chose the name Protitan. Granger and Gregory designated both Dolichorhinus olseni and Manteoceras irdinensis as synonyms of P. grangeri. The D. olseni type specimen was found to be crushed, which distorted its proportions; otherwise its dimensions agreed entirely with those of P. grangeri. The Manteoceras irdinensis type specimen was also determined to have distorted proportions, in this case due to the missing upper front part of the mandible, and its dental dimensions were found to be close to those of P. grangeri.

Granger and Gregory described five additional species of Protitan in 1943: P. minor, P. cingulatus, P. robustus, P. bellus, and P. obliquidens, all based on additional fossils from the Irdin Manha Formation. (Note: Granger and Gregory recorded the provenance of the type specimens of all Protitan species as the Irdin Manha Formation, except for P. cingulatus, which they noted was based on fossils "doubtfully" recorded as from the Houldjin Formation, ten miles west of Camp Margetts. Modern reassessments of the "Houldjin" sediments near Camp Margetts have reassessed them as being from the Irdin Manha Formation.) P. minor was based on the skull AMNH 26416, and mainly distinguished from P. grangeri by its smaller size. P. robustus was based on the lower jaw AMNH 20104, and distinguished by its canines and premolars, which Granger and Gregory considered too large and progressive to fit with P. grangeri. P. bellus was based on the fragmentary skull AMNH 26104, and distinguished from P. grangeri by its strong incisors and canines, and from P. robustus by its cheek teeth being "too small to match" AMNH 20104. P. obliquidens was based on the partial left maxilla AMNH 20125, which Granger and Gregory found to be similar to P. bellus in most respects, except in the greater width of the second premolar. P. cingulatus was based on the right lower jaw AMNH 26412, which Granger and Gregory interpreted as "remarkable advanced" in its premolars, but otherwise quite primitive and relatively small. P. cingulatus was only provisionally referred to Protitan.

=== Later discoveries and assessments ===
Mandibles referred to "Protitan robustus" by Granger and Gregory, AMNH 20110 (top) and AMNH 20104 (bottom)

In the decades following Granger and Gregory's work, paleontologists working on Asian brontothere fossils referred a large number of Middle Eocene fossils to Protitan. Fragmentary brontothere fossils from the Middle Eocene Dongjun Formation, in Guangxi were referred to cf. Protitan sp. in 1977. In 1980, Nataliia Mikhailovna Yanovskaya described two new species of Protitan from the Khaichin Formation of Mongolia: P. khaitshinus and P. reshetovi. Yanovskaya also incorrectly interpreted P. robustus as belonging to the more primitive genus Epimanteoceras, and designated it as a junior synonym of the dubious species E. amplus. In 1992, isolated teeth and postcranial elements from the Tukhum Formation were referred to Protitan sp., and brontothere fossils from the Kyzylbulak Formation in Kazakhstan were provisionally referred to Protitan in the 1990s. The Kyzylbulak fossils were later, in 2004, reassessed as belonging to the new genus Aktautitan. In 2004, Huang Xue-Shi and Zheng Jia-Jian referred brontothere fossils from the Lumeiyi Formation in Yunnan, China to both Protitan cf. robustus and a new species, Protitan major. P. major was based on a partial maxilla (IVPP V.13802) which appeared to come from an animal larger than any previously known Protitan.

The Protitan fossil material was reassessed by Matthew C. Mihlbachler in a 2008 monograph on brontotheres. Mihlbachler agreed with Granger and Gregory that Dolichorhinus olseni and Manteoceras irdinensis were synonyms of P. grangeri. Several species of Protitan were also determined to either be junior synonyms or nomina dubia. P. robustus, P. bellus, and P. obliquidens were all designated as junior synonyms of P. grangeri. Mihlbachler noted that intraspecific variation and taphonomic distortion were largely ignored by Granger and Gregory, and that the fossils of these species "easily fit" into acceptable ranges of diversity for P. grangeri. P. cingulatus was designated as a nomen dubium and found to probably be distinct from Protitan, but Mihlbachler noted that it could possibly belong to Epimanteoceras formosus (of which it would then be a junior synonym), where the lower jaw is unknown. The only species recognized by Mihlbachler as a valid species of Protitan other than P. grangeri was P. minor. Mihlbachler identified several additional differences between P. grangeri and P. minor not noted by Granger and Gregory in the skull morphology.

Per Mihlbachler's revision, none of the fossils outside of the original material described by Granger and Gregory resembles Protitan, which restricts the known range of the genus to the Irdin Manha Formation. Mihlbachler reassessed Yanovskaya's P. khaitshinus and P. relictus as belonging to the genus Metatitan. P. major was designated as a non-diagnostic nomen dubium, with Mihlbachler noting that its advanced dentition precludes classification in Protitan and is more similar to Metatitan. Other "Protitan" fossils from the Tukhum, Lumeiyi, and Dongjun formations were determined to be non-diagnostic.

In a 2022 faunal list, Takehisa Tsubamoto and colleagues proposed that P. robustus does not represent Protitan at all, and could instead be a synonym of Nasamplus progressus.

== Description ==
Protitan was an intermediate-sized to large brontothere. P. minor was a smaller animal than P. grangeri. In 2023, Oscar Sanisidro, Mihlbachler, and Juan L. Cantalapiedra estimated both species to be in a similar size range, based on dental dimensions, with P. grangeri estimated at 1,168.9 kilograms (2,577 lb) and P. minor at 1,224.1 kilograms (2,699 lb).

=== Skull ===
Top and bottom view of the type skull of P. minor (AMNH 26416)

Protitan had a saddle-shaped skull. The dorsal surface of the anterior (front) half of the skull was relatively flat, but the posterior (back) half was concave. The general shape of the skull was similar in P. grangeri and P. minor, but the preorbital region (facial region, in front of the eyes) was much shorter in P. minor. The zygomatic arches were nearly straight in both P. grangeri and P. minor. The posterior and outward ends of the zygomatic arches, especially those of P. grangeri, had small, projecting processes. Granger and Gregory referred to these as "postzygomatic horns", though they do not represent additional horns. The postzygomatic processes is one of the features that distinguishes Protitan from Protitanotherium. The nasal process of Protitan was long, broad, unelevated, and angled slightly downwards. In P. minor, the nasal process had thin and shallow walls, whereas the nasal process of P. grangeri had thickened sides. The nasal process of P. grangeri also had a thinner and more rounded end point, with a downturned tip. In both P. minor and P. grangeri, the nasal process was about as long as the premaxillomaxillary rostrum (the part of the jaw extending below the nasal incision). In the P. minor type skull, the nasal process is mostly missing, and has erroneously been reconstructed with plaster to be shorter than it was in life.

Protitan had a pair of small, short, and elliptical horns, positioned low on the skull, similar to the horns of Protitanotherium. The horns of P. minor were placed slightly in front of the orbits (eye sockets); those of P. grangeri were placed much further forwards on the skull.

The nasal incision of Protitan was relatively shallow, extending back to the third pair of premolars in P. grangeri, and the first pair of molars in P. minor. The orbits were placed above the posterior part of the second pair of molars, and the anterior part of the third pair of molars. The sides of the skull had parasagittal ridges (ridges running lengthwise along the skull), which strongly constricted the skull's upper surface towards the back. The occiput was angled slightly backwards. In P. grangeri, the nuchal crest was nearly flat, whereas that of P. minor was concave. Protitan is the only horned brontothere to retain a ventrally unconstricted external auditory pseudomeatus (one of the ear bones).

=== Dentition ===
Protitan had the dental formula 3.1.4.33.1.4.3. The upper incisors were large and subcaniniform (canine-shaped, i.e. relatively thick, rounded, and pointed), a notable feature that distinguishes Protitan from Protitanotherium. The incisors increased in size from the first to third pair, and were positioned in an arch in front of the canines. There were short diastemata (gaps between teeth) both between the incisors and canines, and between the canines and premolars. The canines of P. minor were relatively larger than those of P. grangeri. The first pair of premolars had a simple morphology. The second pair of premolars had distinct metacones (one of the cusps), and all pairs of premolars lacked hypocones (another cusp). The upper molars had tall, lingually angled (angled toward the tongue) ectolophs.

No mandibles can be confidently referred to P. minor, and the lower dentition of P. minor is thus unknown. Since the upper dentitions of P. grangeri and P. minor were very similar, it is unlikely that the lower dentition differed significantly between the two species. The lower incisors of P. grangeri were relatively large, and positioned in an arch in front of the lower canines. The first and second pairs of lower incisors were semispatulate, with rounded apices, whereas the third pair were sharper and more subcaniniform. The lower incisors were all about the same size. The only diastemata in the lower dentition of P. grangeri were between the canines and premolars, and varied in length between specimens, covarying with the size of the canines. The first pair of lower premolars were very small, with short talonid (crushing part) heels. The lengths of the trigonids (shearing parts) and talonids of the subsequent pairs of premolars varied. The lower molars of P. grangeri were typical of derived brontotheres, with relatively thin lingual (tongue-facing) enamel, and shallow trigonid and talonid basins. The third pair of lower molars were elongated.

== Classification ==
In 1943, Granger and Gregory classified Protitan in the brontothere subfamily "Epimanteoceratinae", and believed the genus to be closely related to Epimanteoceras, and ancestral to Rhinotitan. In 1997, Malcolm McKenna and Susan K. Bell placed Protitan (alongside both Rhinotitan and Epimanteoceras) in the subfamily "Brontopinae". Mihlbachler established a new internal taxonomy of brontotheres in his 2008 monograph. In Mihlbachler's 2008 phylogenetic analysis, and in subsequent analyses, Protitan has generally been recovered as the basalmost genus in the subtribe Brontotheriina (the horned brontotheres).

Mihlbachler recovered P. grangeri and P. minor in a polytomy with the rest of Brontotheriina, and thus considered it uncertain whether P. grangeri and P. minor were congeneric. Subsequent analyses have varied between repeating this result and recovering Protitan as monophyletic. The cladogram below shows Brontotheriina as recovered by Mihlbachler in 2008:

- Brontotheriina
  - Protitan grangeri
  - Protitan minor
  - - Protitanotherium emarginatum
    - - - Rhinotitan kaiseni
        - Rhinotitan andrewsi
      - - Pachytitan ajax
        - Diplacodon elatus
        - Brontotheriita
          ⊞
          - Parabrontops gobiensis
          - Protitanops curryi
          - - Eubrontotherium clarnoensis
            - - Dianotitan lunanensis
              - Duchesneodus uintensis
              - - Megacerops coloradensis
                - Megacerops kuwagatarhinus
          ⊟
      - Embolotheriita
        ⊞
        - - Aktautitan hippopotamopus
          - - Pollyosbornia altidens
            - Gnathotitan berkeyi
        - - Pygmaetitan panxianensis
          - - Brachydiastematherium transylvanicum
            - Metatitan khaitshinus
            - - Metatitan primus
              - Metatitan relictus
          - - Nasamplus progressus
            - - Protembolotherium efremovi
              - - Embolotherium andrewsi
                - Embolotherium grangeri
        ⊟

== Paleoecology ==
The Erlian Basin, in which the Irdin Manha Formation is situated, experienced a subtropical and humid climate during the Eocene. The vegetation was highly diverse and dominated by deciduous trees and shrubs. The habitat during the Irdinmanhan land mammal age was more forest-dominated than the drier and probably more open habitats of the subsequent Sharamurunian.

Perissodactyls were a dominant component of the Irdinmanhan mammal fauna. Other brontotheres known from the Irdin Manha Formation include Gnathotitan and Metatelmatherium. Other perissodactyl groups represented included lophialetids, rhodopagids, deperetellids, helaletids, as well as various rhinocerotoids, including amynodonts. Several artiodactyls are also known, including the giant Andrewsarchus. Other groups of large mammals known from the Irdin Manha Formation include dinoceratans, cimolestans, and mesonychians such as Hapalodectes and Mongolonyx.
