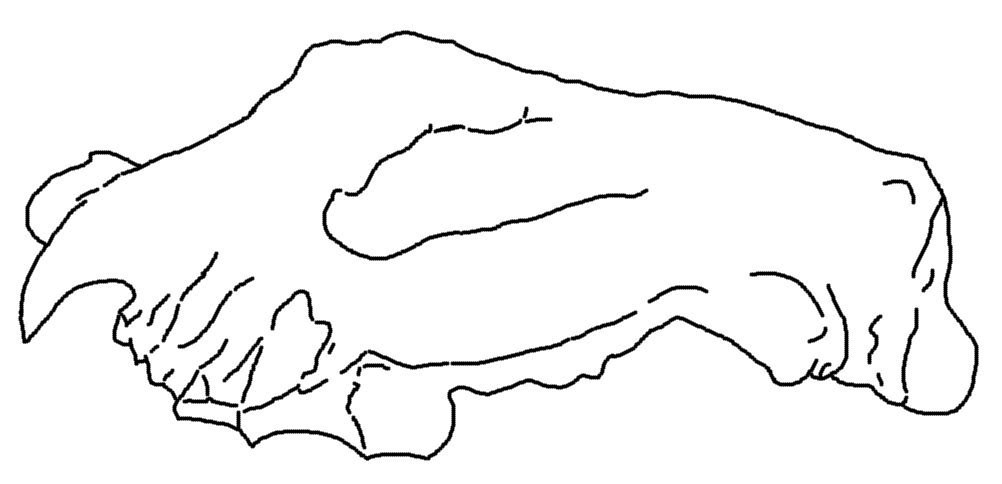
- Illustration of the type skull (IVPP V.3015) of S. bahoensis

Scientific classification
- Kingdom: Animalia
- Phylum: Chordata
- Class: Mammalia
- Order: Perissodactyla
- Superfamily: Rhinocerotoidea
- Family: †Amynodontidae
- Tribe: †Cadurcodontini
- Genus: †Sianodon; Xu, 1965

Type species
- †Sianodon bahoensis Xu, 1965

Other species
- †S. chiyuanensis? Zhou & Xu, 1965; †S. gaowangouensis? Li, 2003; †S. honanensis? Zhou & Xu, 1965; †S. mienchiensis? Zhou & Xu, 1965; †S. ulausuensis? Xu, 1966

Synonyms
- Synonyms of S. bahoensis: Cadurcodon bahoensis (Xu, 1965)

= Sianodon =

Sianodon Temporal range: Middle Eocene–Early Oligocene

Extinct genus of mammals

Sianodon ("Sian tooth") is an extinct genus of amynodont that lived in East Asia during the Middle Eocene to Early Oligocene. Several species of Sianodon have traditionally been recognized, known from the Middle Eocene to Early Oligocene of China. The best known species of Sianodon is the type species, S. bahoensis, known from a well-preserved skull found in Shaanxi.

Sianodon was a relatively large animal; S. bahoensis has been estimated to have reached a weight of 1,340 kilograms (2,950 lbs). Sianodon may be paraphyletic, and S. bahoensis was suggested in 2017 to possibly be a species of the related genus Cadurcodon, which would make Sianodon a junior synonym of that genus. Since other species of Sianodon are not consistent with Cadurcodon, their taxonomic status would in that case become unclear. Despite these taxonomic issues, Sianodon continues to be used as a genus in practice.

== Research history ==
=== Descriptions of species ===
Illustration of the incomplete and broken tooth series fourth premolar to third molar) of the type maxilla (IVPP V.3022) of S. chiyuanensis

Illustration of the underside of the type skull (IVPP V.13381) of S. gaowangouensis

Sianodon bahoensis was described by Xu Yu-Xuan in 1965. The fossils included a complete and well-preserved skull (IVPP V.3015), designated as the type specimen, as well as a complete mandible (IG 59003), and another fragmentary mandible (IVPP V.3015.1). All three fossils are from the Bailuyuan Formation of Shaanxi, China, dated to the Early Oligocene. The type skull and the fragmentary mandible were found in 1963 at Shahezigou, Xinhiezhen by an expedition organized by the Institute of Vertebrate Paleontology and Paleoanthropology. The mandible was found by an expedition by the Institite of Geology in 1969, at Maoxicun Sian.

Later in 1965, Zhou Mingzhen and Xu described three additional species of Sianodon, all from the Late Eocene of Henan, China: S. honanesis, S. mienchiensis, and S. chiyuanensis. The species "Amynodon" sinensis, described by Otto Zdansky in 1930, was also referred to Sianodon by Zhou and Xu, as S. sinensis. Zhou and Xu provided a revised diagnosis of S. sinensis, and referred some additional fossil material to the species. These fossils included material from Henan, including from the locality of the A. sinensis type specimen, as well as fossils from Yuanqu in Shanxi.

S. mienchiensis was based on a right third molar (IVPP V.3021.2), designated as the type specimen, and an incomplete lower jaw of a immature specimen preserving teeth the fourth premolar to second molar (IVPP V.3021), all found near Jentsun in Mianchi County, Henan. The fossils were recovered from the Heti Formation (the specific sequence was formerly treated as the "Yuanchü Formation"), which corresponds in time to the Shara Murun Formation in Inner Mongolia, which in turn has been dated to the Middle Eocene (Sharamurunian). S. mienchiensis was considered very similar to S. bahoensis, with a virtually identical third molar, and was mainly distinguished by its smaller size.

S. honanensis was based on associated right (IVPP V.3020) and left (IVPP V.3020.1) maxillae, preserving the fourth premolar to third molar and a complete series of upper molars, respectively. The fossils were recovered from the Lushi Formation, in the village of Menchiapu in Lushi, Henan, the same site as the type specimen of the fellow amynodont Lushiamynodon menchiapuensis. S. honanensis was noted to be close in size to S. sinensis, and to have similar teeth. Several features of the teeth were interpreted as distinguishing the two species, with S. honanensis noted to possess a more molariform fourth premolar with a longer metaloph, more transverse lophs of the molars, more prominent lingual (towards the tongue) cingula, and a shorter posterior (back) loph on the third molar. Two of these traits, the shorter posterior loph on the third molar and the more molariform fourth premolar, are shared with Lushiamynodon menchipuensis.

S. chiyuanensis was based on a maxilla (IVPP V.3022), which preserves an incomplete tooth series consisting of the fourth premolar to second molar, and the anterior (forward) part of the third molar. The maxilla was found in the Late Eocene red sandstone beds of Tungchang, a village in Xichuan County in northern Henan. These beds probably correspond in time to the Heti Formation. S. chiyuanensis was noted to be similar to S. sinensis, but larger in size and distinguished by a less reduced fourth premolar with a long metaloph, and molars with a flatter external wall.

Xu described another species of Sianodon in 1966, S. ulausuensis, from the Shara Murun Formation in Inner Mongolia. S. ulausuensis was described based on a nearly complete skull (IVPP V.3215) and distinguished by Xu from S. bahoensis by several apparently more primitive traits, such as a relatively long face and three upper incisors. Xu also reported a maxilla (IVPP V.3221), preserving the second and third molars, from the same location, which he attributed to Sianodon sp.

In 2003, Li Qian described a new species of Sianodon, S. gaowangouensis, from Bailuyuan Formation of Shaanxi. S. gaowangouensis was based on an incomplete skull (IVPP V.13381), preserving much of the upper dentition. The species was referred to Sianodon on account of the short diastema (gap) between the second premolar and the canine, the flat external walls of the molars, and the great distance between the posttympanic and postglenoid processes on the ventral (lower) side of the skull. Li distinguished S. gauwangouensis from other species of Sianodon based on dental features, most importantly the greater length ratio of P_{2}–P_{4}M_{1}–M_{3} compared to the other species.

=== Reassessments and status ===
Type jaw of "Amynodon" sinensis, which was assigned to Sianodon from 1965 to 2017 but has since been understood to be a significantly more basal amynodont

The validity and diversity of Sianodon has been questioned since the late 1980s. In 1989, William P. Wall considered the type species S. bahoensis to be the only valid species of Sianodon, finding there to be little justification for the assignments of the other species to the genus. Wall further noted that S. bahoensis is Early Oligocene in age, whereas the other species named at the time were all Late Eocene, and suggested that the other species could perhaps belong to the genus Sharamynodon. Wall did not make any formal reassignments, noting that the all of the fossils were in need of reexamination.

In 2017, Alexander Averianov, Igor Danilov, Jin Jianhua, and Wang Yingyong suggested that S. bahoensis should be reclassified in the genus Cadurcodon. Xu did not include a comparison with Cadurcodon in the original description, other than a brief mention that Sianodon appeared to be more primitive than Cadurcodon. According to Averianov et al., all characters mentioned in Xu's original diagnosis of Sianodon are also found in Cadurcodon, with the exception that the labial grooves of the molars (separating the trigonids and talonids) are either absent or shallower in Cadurcodon. In 1989, Wall listed some additional features separating the two genera: "retention of two pairs of lower incisors, less extreme posterior expansion of the nasal incision, relatively less massive premaxillae and nasals, and more distinct postorbital constriction." Averianov et al. considered the importance of these features to be doubtful. The nasal incision is similar in both genera and the taxonomic importance of the postorbital constriction is not clear. The number of incisors is a sexually dimorphic trait—males, with large canines, only have one pair of lower incisors whereas females have two pairs—and the shape of nasal bones and premaxillae are likely to have varied due to both sexual dimorphism and ontogeny.

Averianov et al. argued that S. bahoensis belonged to Cadurcodon, as C. bahoensis, and that Sianodon was thus a junior synonym of that genus. None of the other Sianodon species were suggested to belong to Cadurcodon, however. S. ulausensis and S. gaowangouensis were suggested to be distinct, as their three pairs of upper incisors place them outside Cadurcodon. In a phylogenetic analysis, S. sinensis was recovered as a significantly more primitive amynodont, which Averianov et al. treated under the original name, "Amynodon" sinensis. The fragmentary species from Henan—S. chiyuanensis, S. honanesis, and S. mienchiensis—were suggested to be small and primitive amynodonts that might represent the same animal as "Amynodon" sinensis. Only S. sinensis and S. bahoensis were included in the phylogenetic analysis.

The reassignment of S. bahoensis to Cadurcodon was accepted by Tissier et al. (2018) and Wang et al. (2020). In phylogenetic analyses, both Tissier et al. (2018) and Veine-Tonizzo et al. (2023) recovered "C. bahoensis" as the most basal of the species assigned to Cadurcodon. Bai et al. (2018) continued to use Sianodon as a valid genus, encompassing S. bahoensis and other species, such as S. ulausuensis. Several other authors have also continued to use Sianodon. Both Tissier et al. and Wang et al. also continued to provisionally use the name Sianodon for the species other than S. bahoensis assigned to the genus, which they considered to be in need of further reassessment.

== Description ==
Sianodon was similar to other amynodonts in appearance. It had an elongated skull (especially the postorbital region, i.e. behind the eyes), with a relatively short face, and a relatively low sagittal crest. Sianodon had relatively large canines in the lower jaw that protruded upwards, and relatively small incisors. The species assigned to Sianodon varied considerably in size. S. bahoensis reached a body size of about 1,340 kilograms (2,950 lbs). S. gaowangouensis and S. chiyuanensis were similar in size to each other, but smaller than S. bahoensis and S. ulausuensis. The other species—S. chiyuanensis, S. honanesis, and S. mienchiensis—were much smaller.

Dentition is variable across the species assigned to Sianodon. The full range of variability is not known since several species are known from fragmentary remains. S. bahoensis had the dental formula 2.1.3.32.1.2.3. Both S. ulausuensis and S. gaowangouensis had three (rather than two) pairs of upper incisors.

== Classification ==
Xu characterized Sianodon bahoensis as more specialized than Paramynodon but more primitive than Cadurcodon. In revisions of the amynodonts in the 1980s, William P. Wall classified Sianodon as part of the tapir-like amynodont tribe Cardurcodontini.

The cladogram below is adapted from a phylogenetic analysis by Tissier et al. (2018), which recovers Sianodon as paraphyletic:

- Amynodontidae
  - Rostriamynodon grangeri
  - - Amynodon advenus
    - - Sharamynodon mongoliensis
      - - Metamynodontini
          - Paramynodon birmanicus
          - - Megalamynodon regalis
            - - Sellamynodon zimborensis
              - Metamynodon planifrons
        - Cadurcodontini
          - - "Amynodon" reedi
            - - Zaisanamynodon borisovi
              - Zaisanamynodon protheroi
          - - Sianodon gaowangouensis
            - - - - Amynodontopsis bodei
                  - Amynodontopsis aff. bodei
                - - Cadurcotherium minus
                  - Cadurcotherium cayluxi
              - - Cadurcodon bahoensis (Sianodon bahoensis)
                - - Cadurcodon maomingensis
                  - - Cadurcodon ardyensis
                    - Cadurcodon kazakademius

== Paleoecology ==
The Shara Murun Formation preserves the type fauna of the Sharamurunian land mammal age. The Erlian Basin, in which the Shara Murun Formation is situated, experienced a subtropical and humid climate during the Eocene. The vegetation was highly diverse and dominated by deciduous trees and shrubs. S. ulausuensis of the Shara Murun Formation coexisted with other amynodonts, including Cadurcodon, Caenolophus, and Sharamynodon. Among the other mammals represented were brontotheres, paraceratheres, deperetellids, primitive ruminants, and rodents. S. mienchiensis is known from the lower part of the Heti Formation (the Rencun member), where it occurs together with fossils of other amynodonts, including Caenolophus and Sharamynodon, as well as hyracodonts, deperetellids, rhodopagids, eomoropids, hyaenodonts (Orienspterodon), mesonychids (Honanodon), primates (Hoanghonius), anthracotheres, helohyids, and rodents.

The faunas of the Lushi Formation are divided into the Upper and Lower Lushi Faunas; S. honanensis belongs to the Upper Lushi Fauna. This diverse fauna encompasses numerous other perissodactyls, including the fellow amynodonts Lushiamynodon and Caenolophus, as well as lophialetids, hyracodonts, paraceratheres, brontotheres, deperetellids, helaletids, and chalicotherioids. Several carnivorans are known, including the amphicyonid Cynodictis, miacid Miacis, and nimravid Eusmilus. Additional taxa recorded include artiodactyls such as Andrewsarchus, Dichobune, Gobiohyus, and possibly Anthracotherium, the pantodont Eudinoceras, the mesonychids Honanodon and Lohoodon, the hyaenodonts Hyaenodon and Propterodon, the primate Lushius, lagomorphs, rodents, and tillodonts. The fauna known from the Bailuyuan Formation is not as diverse; in addition to S. bahoensis and S. gaowangouensis, the Bailuyuan Formation has yielded fossils of lophialetids (Simplaletes), indeterminate leporids, and the artiodactyl Lantianius.
