= Shara Murun Formation =

Geologic formation in Inner Mongolia, China

- Stratigraphic range: Middle Eocene (Sharamurunian)
- Type: Formation
- Unit of: Erlian Basin
- Sub-units: Upper member Lower member
- Underlies: Ulan Gochu Formation
- Overlies: Tukhum Formation

Location
- Region: Inner Mongolia
- Country: China

The Shara Murun Formation is a geologic formation in Inner Mongolia, northern China. The deposits of the Shara Murun Formation date to the Middle Eocene, and preserve fossils of a diverse, perissodactyl-dominated mammal fauna. The fossil fauna of the Shara Murun Formation is the type fauna of the Sharamurunian, one of the Asian land mammal ages (ALMAs).

== Research history ==
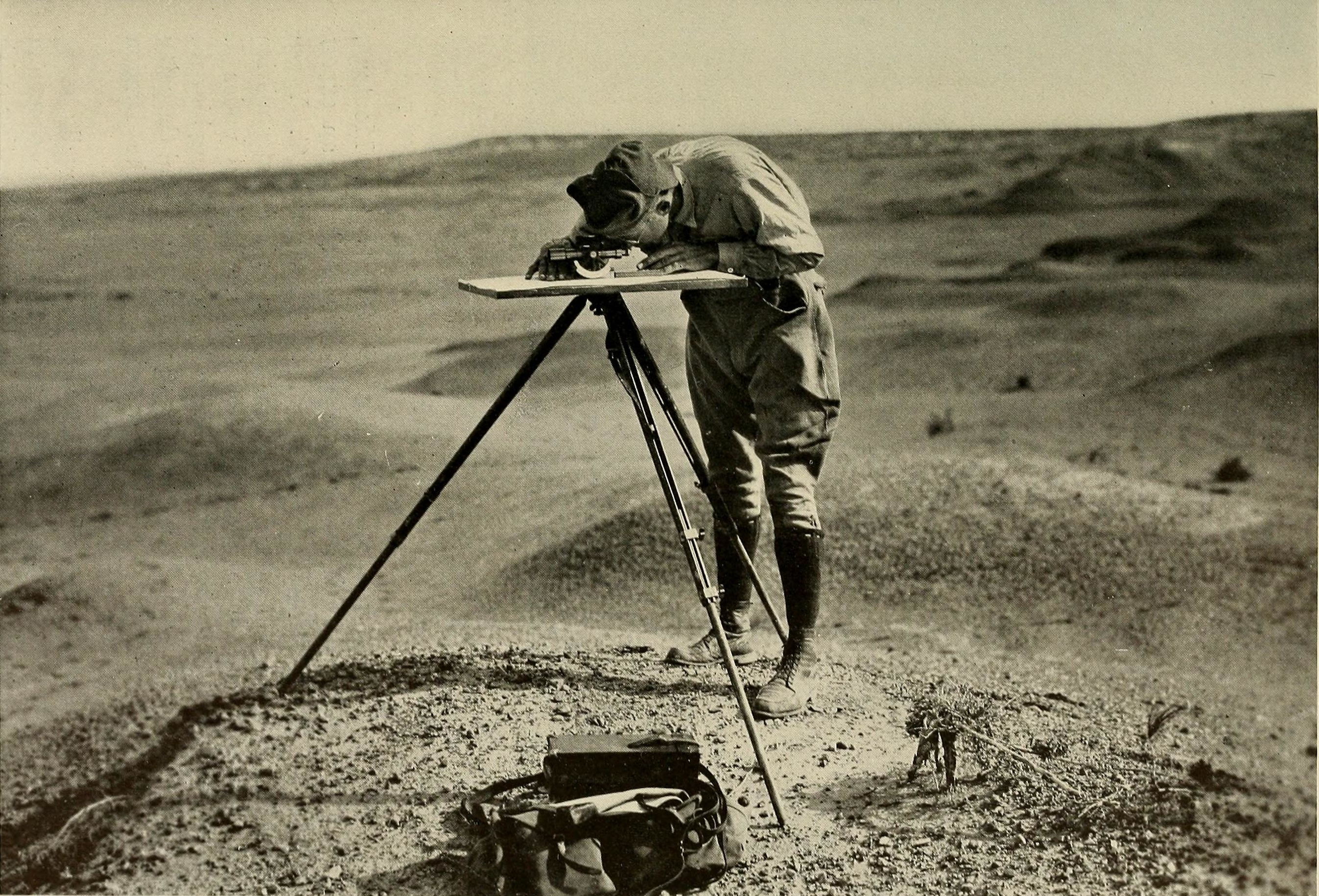
Geologist Frederick K. Morris in the Shara Murun region, photographed by Walter W. Granger in 1922–1924

The deposits of the Shara Murun Formation are situated in the Erlian Basin, a structural basin located in central Inner Mongolia in northern China, close to the border between China and Mongolia. The first study on the Erlian Basin was published by the Russian geologist Vladimir Obruchev in 1892. The basin was later extensively studied by the Central Asiatic Expeditions of the American Museum of Natural History, over the course of five field seasons in the 1920s. The researchers of the Central Asiatic Expeditions were responsible for naming most of the formations in the basin, including the Shara Murun Formation. Later studies and field expeditions in the Erlian Basin were conducted by the Sino-Soviet Paleontological Expedition in 1959–1960, the Regional Geological Survey of the Nei Mongol Autonomous Region in the 1960s and 1970s, and the Institute of Vertebrate Paleontology and Paleoanthropology, American Museum of Natural History, and Carnegie Museum of Natural History since the 1980s.

The Erlian Basin preserves near-continuous sedimentary layers from the late Paleocene to the early Oligocene. The Shara Murun Formation preserves strata of Middle Eocene age. It overlies the Tukhum Formation and underlies the Ulan Gochu Formation.

Because the Eocene sediments in the Erlian Basin are near-continuous, there has been much debate historically over where certain stratigraphic units end and others begin. The Asian land mammal ages (ALMA) of the Eocene are mainly based on the different fossil faunas found in the Erlian Basin; the fauna of the Shara Murun Formation is the type fauna of the Sharamurunian ALMA. Debate on the stratigraphy have complicated reconstructions of the Asian Eocene, since definitions and interpretations of the stratigraphic units impact the definitions of the land mammal ages. In some cases, different researchers have used entirely different frameworks and stratigraphic unit names. Much work has been done in the 21st century to establish a functional framework, though some stratigraphic issues still remain.

== Depositional environment ==
The Erlian Basin experienced a subtropical and humid climate during the Eocene. The vegetation was highly diverse and dominated by deciduous trees and shrubs.

== Fossil fauna ==
=== Mammals ===
==== Artiodactyla ====
Genus/family	Species	Locality	Notes/affinities	Images
Archaeomeryx	A. optatus	Ula Usu	A ruminant.	
Brachyhyops	B. neimonngoliensis	Twin Oboes	An entelodont.	
Lophiomeryx	L. angarae	Twin Oboes	A ruminant.	
Tapiruloides	T. usuensis	Ula Usu	A tapirulid.	
Ulausuodon	U. parvus		An anthracothere.	

==== Hyaenodontia ====
Genus/family	Species	Locality	Notes/affinities	Images
Propterodon	P. cf. morrisi			
"Pterodon"	"P". hyaenoides	Spring Camp		

==== Lagomorpha ====
Genus/family	Species	Locality	Notes/affinities	Images
Desmatolagus	D. vetustus	Twin Oboes		
Desmatolagus	D. sp.			
Gobiolagus	G. andrewsi	Twin Oboes		
Gobiolagus	G. tolmachovi			

==== Mesonychia ====
Genus/family	Species	Locality	Notes/affinities	Images
Mongolestes	M. hadrodens	Twin Oboes	A mesonychid.	

==== Perissodactyla ====
Genus/family	Species	Locality	Notes/affinities	Images
Amynodontidae	Amynodontidae indet.	Spring Camp	Indeterminate amynodont fossils.	
Cadurcodon	C. ardynensis	East of Spring Camp	An amynodont.	
Caenolophus	C. obliquus	Ula Usu	An amynodont.	
Caenolophus	C. promissus	Ula Usu	An amynodont.	
Deperetella	D. cristata	Ula Usu	A deperetellid.	
Deperetella	D. cf. cristata	Twin Oboes	About 25% larger than the D. cristata fossils from Ula Usu.	
Eomoropus	E. major	Twin Oboes	An eomoropid.	
Gigantamynodon	G. promisus	Ula Usu	An amynodont. Regarded as a nomen dubium.	
Juxia	J. sharamurenensis	Ula Usu; Twin Oboes; East of Spring Camp	A paracerathere.	
Lushiamynodon	L. sharamurenensis	Ula Usu	An amynodont. Lushiamynodon may be a synonym of Sharamynodon. L. sharamurenensis is based on fragmentary fossils.	
Metamynodontini	Metamynodontini indet.	Twin Oboes	Amynodonts. Some fossils have historically been referred to the genus Metamynodon, otherwise treated as a solely North American genus.	
Pachytitan	P. ajax	North of Baron Sog Lamasery	A brontothere.	
Pappaceras	P. minuta	East of Spring Camp	A rhinocerotoid.	
Parabrontops	P. cf. gobiensis	Spring Camp	A brontothere.	
Rhinotitan	R. andrewsi	Ula Usu	A brontothere.	
Rhinotitan	R. kaiseni	Ula Usu	A brontothere.	
Rhodopagus?	R.? minimus	Ula Usu	A rhodopagid. R. minimus was originally described as a species of Caenolophus.	
Sharamynodon	S. mongoliensis	Ula Usu; Spring Camp; North of Baron Sog Lamasery	An amynodont.	
Sianodon	S. ulausensis	Ula Usu	An amynodont. The genus Sianodon may be a synonym of Cadurcodon, though S. ulausensis would in that case likely belong to a new genus.	
Titanodectes	T. minor	Spring Camp	A brontothere. The species T. ingens was previously also considered to be from the Shara Murun; following reassessments, only T. minor is represented in the Shara Murun.	
Triplopus	T.? progressus	Ula Usu	A rhinocerotoid. T. progressus was originally described as a species of Caenolophus.	
Triplopus	T. turgaiensis	Twin Oboes	A rhinocerotoid. T. progressus was originally described as a species of Caenolophus.	

==== Olseniidae ====
Genus/family	Species	Locality	Notes/affinities	Images
Olsenia	O. mira		Enigmatic ungulate-like mammal; previously treated as a mesonychid.	

==== Pholidota ====
Genus/family	Species	Locality	Notes/affinities	Images
Cryptomanis?	C. gobiensis	Twin Oboes	Alternatively classified as a creodont. It is unclear if these fossils are from the Shara Murun or Ulan Gochu formation.	

==== Rodentia ====
Genus/family	Species	Locality	Notes/affinities	Images
Youmys	Y. cavioides			

=== Reptiles ===
Genus/family	Species	Locality	Notes/affinities	Images
Arretosaurus	A. ornatus	Twin Oboes	An arretosaurid lizard.	
