= Ulan Gochu Formation =

Geologic formation in Inner Mongolia, China

- Stratigraphic range: Late Middle Eocene or Late Eocene (Ulangochuian)
- Type: Formation
- Unit of: Erlian Basin
- Underlies: Baron Sog Formation
- Overlies: Shara Murun Formation

Location
- Region: Inner Mongolia
- Country: China

The Ulan Gochu Formation is a geologic formation in Inner Mongolia, northern China. The deposits of the Ulan Gochu Formation date to the late Middle Eocene or Late Eocene, and preserve fossils of a diverse, perissodactyl-dominated mammal fauna. The fossil fauna of the Ulan Gochu Formation is the type fauna of the Ulangochuian, one of the Asian land mammal ages (ALMAs).

== Research history ==
The deposits of the Ulan Gochu Formations are situated in the Erlian Basin, a structural basin located in central Inner Mongolia in northern China, close to the border between China and Mongolia. The first study on the Erlian Basin was published by the Russian geologist Vladimir Obruchev in 1892. It was later extensively studied by the Central Asiatic Expeditions of the American Museum of Natural History, over the course of five field seasons in the 1920s. The researchers of the Central Asiatic Expeditions were responsible for naming most of the formations in the basin, including the Ulan Gochu Formations. Later studies and field expeditions in the Erlian Basin were conducted by the Sino-Soviet Paleontological Expedition in 1959–1960, the Regional Geological Survey of the Nei Mongol Autonomous Region in the 1960s and 1970s, and the Institute of Vertebrate Paleontology and Paleoanthropology, American Museum of Natural History, and Carnegie Museum of Natural History since the 1980s.

The Erlian Basin preserves near-continuous sedimentary layers from the late Paleocene to the early Oligocene. The Ulan Gochu Formation preserves strata of late Middle Eocene or Late Eocene age. It overlies the Shara Murun Formation and underlies the Baron Sog Formation.

Because the Eocene sediments in the Erlian Basin are near-continuous, there has been much debate historically over where certain stratigraphic units end and others begin. The Asian land mammal ages (ALMA) of the Eocene are mainly based on the different fossil faunas found in the Erlian Basin; the fauna of the Ulan Gochu Formation is the type fauna of the Ulangochuian ALMA. Debate on the stratigraphy have complicated reconstructions of the Asian Eocene, since definitions and interpretations of the stratigraphic units impact the definitions of the land mammal ages. In some cases, different researchers have used entirely different frameworks and stratigraphic unit names. Much work has been done in the 21st century to establish a functional framework, though some stratigraphic issues still remain.

== Depositional environment ==
The Erlian Basin experienced a subtropical and humid climate during the Eocene. The vegetation was highly diverse and dominated by deciduous trees and shrubs.

== Fossil fauna ==
=== Mammals ===
==== Anagaloidea ====
Genus/family	Species	Locality	Notes/affinities	Images
Anagale	A. gobiensis	Twin Oboes	An anagalid.	

==== Artiodactyla ====
Genus/family	Species	Locality	Notes/affinities	Images
Brachyhyops	B. sp.	Jhama Obo	An entelodont.	

==== Didymoconidae ====
Genus/family	Species	Locality	Notes/affinities	Images
Didymoconus	D. sp.	Jhama Obo		

==== Hyaenodontia ====
Genus/family	Species	Locality	Notes/affinities	Images
Hyaenodon	H. sp.	Jhama Obo		

==== Lagomorpha ====
Genus/family	Species	Locality	Notes/affinities	Images
Desmatolagus	D. vetustus	Jhama Obo		
Gobiolagus	G. andrewsi	Jhama Obo		

==== Mesonychia ====
Genus/family	Species	Locality	Notes/affinities	Images
Mongolestes	M. hadrodens	Jhama Obo	A mesonychid.	

==== Perissodactyla ====
Genus/family	Species	Locality	Notes/affinities	Images
Amynodontopsis	A. parvidens	Jhama Obo; Nom Khong Obo; North of Baron Sog Lamasery	An amynodont.	
Amynodontopsis	A. tholos	South of Jhama Obo; Ulan Shireh Obo; Nom Khong Obo	An amynodont.	
Ardynia	A. praecox	Erden Obo	A hyracodont.	
Cadurcodon	C. matthewi	Jhama Obo	An amynodont.	
Embolotherium	E. andrewsi	Jhama Obo; South of Jhama Obo; Ulan Shireh Obo	A brontothere.	
Embolotherium	E. grangeri	Twin Oboes; North of Baron Sog Lamasery; South of Baron Sog Lamasery	A brontothere.	
Juxia	J. sharamurenensis	Ulan Shireh Obo	A paracerathere.	
Juxia	J. shoui	Erden Obo	A paracerathere.	
Metamynodontini	Metamynodontini indet.	Jhama Obo	An amynodont.	
Nasamplus	N. progressus	Jhama Obo	A brontothere.	
Schizotherium	S. cf. avitum	Erden Obo	A chalicothere.	
Titanodectes	T. ingens	Jhama Obo	A brontothere.	
Titanodectes	T. minor	Twin Oboes	A brontothere.	
Ulanodon	U. wilsoni	Erden Obo	A hyracodont. Previously known as Ulania, a name preoccupied by the trilobite Ulania.	
Urtinotherium	U. intermedium	Erden Obo; Jhama Obo	A paracerathere.	
Zaisanamynodon	Z. borisovi	Ulan Shireh Obo	An amynodont.	

==== Pholidota ====
Genus/family	Species	Locality	Notes/affinities	Images
Cryptomanis?	C. gobiensis	Twin Oboes	Alternatively classified as a creodont. It is unclear if these fossils are from the Shara Murun or Ulan Gochu formation.	

==== Rodentia ====
Genus/family	Species	Locality	Notes/affinities	Images
Ardynomys	A. sp.	Jhama Obo		
Hulgania	H. ertinia	Jhama Obo		
Rodentia	Rodentia indet.			

=== Reptiles ===
Genus/family	Species	Locality	Notes/affinities	Images
Arretosaurus	A. ornatus	Twin Oboes	An arretosaurid lizard.	
Squamata	Squamata indet.	Twin Oboes	Vertebrae from a snake.	
Testudo	T. nanus	Twin Oboes	A small tortoise.	
Testudo	T. sp.	Jhama Obo	A small tortoise.	
Sharemys	S. hemispherica	Twin Oboes	A small tortoise.	
