= Alai Beds =

- Stratigraphic range: Ypresian (Bumbanian); ~55.8–48.6 Ma
- Type: Geological formation
- Overlies: Paleozoic rocks
- Thickness: More than 25 m (82 ft)

Lithology
- Primary: Siltstone, conglomerate
- Other: Limestone

Location
- Coordinates: 39.9°N 69.5°E
- Approximate paleocoordinates: 40.7°N 69.7°E
- Region: Osh
- Country: Kyrgyzstan
- Extent: Aktash Range
- Alai Beds (Kyrgyzstan)

The Alai Beds is an Early Eocene (Ypresian, or Bumbanian in the ALMA classification) geologic formation in the Osh Region of southwestern Kyrgyzstan. The formation has provided many fossils of mammals, lizards, turtles and snakes.

== Description ==
The Paleogene Alai Beds have a limited distribution, and are restricted to the northern slope of Aktash Range, formed by Paleozoic rocks, which is one of the foothills of the Turkestan Range. The Paleogene deposits on the Aktash Range are badly exposed, they can be observed only in three outcrops, separated by short distances about 1 to 2 kilometres (0.62 to 1.24 mi). Despite their close position, the Paleogene deposits in these outcrops are varied greatly in composition and thickness of layers.

The lower Alai Beds contain 5 metres (16 ft) of silts and siltstones, and the upper part comprises oyster-bearing limestones of which 2 to 3 metres (6 ft 7 in to 9 ft 10 in) are exposed. At the base of the Upper Alai Beds there is a layer of conglomerate which produces a number of marine vertebrates, but a few terrestrial vertebrates including mammals. The section I1 is more complete and has a greater thickness, but produces a few shark teeth only. The third Paleogene section, where the mammal bearing locality Andarak 2 is located, has a much greater thickness of sands of the lower Alai Beds (more than 25 metres (82 ft) of visible thickness) with some horizons of oyster-bearing conglomerates.

== Fossil content ==
The formation has provided the following fossils:

=== Mammals ===
Artiodactyls

- Eolantianius russelli
- Diacodexis sp.
- Diacodexeidae indet.

Cimolesta

- Metasarcodon udovichenkoi
- Nuryctes alayensis
- Palaeoryctidae indet.

Hyaenodonta

- Isphanatherium ferganensis
- Neoparapterodon sp.

Lipotyphla

- Protogalericius averianovi

Perissodactyls

- Eoletes tianshanicus
- Pataecops minutissimus
- Lushiamynodon kirghisensis
- Teleolophus medius

Rodents

- Aktashmys montealbus
- Alaymys ctenodactylus
- Anatolimys rozhdestvenskii
- Gobiolagus hekkeri
- Khodzhentia vinogradovi
- Advenimus cf. burkei
- Petrokozlovia cf. notos
- Saykanomys cf. bohlini
- ?Adolomys sp.
- Ctenodactyloidea indet.

=== Reptiles ===
Lizards

- ?Saniwa sp.
- Agamidae indet.
- Uromastycinae indet.

Snakes

- Calamagras turkestanicus
- Palaeophis ferganicus
- Boidae indet.

Turtles

- Hadrianus vialovi
- Cheloniinae indet.

== See also ==
- Ypresian formations
  - Ieper Group of Belgium
  - Fur Formation of Denmark
  - London Clay Formation of England
  - Silveirinha Formation of Portugal
- Wasatchian formations
  - Nanjemoy Formation of the eastern United States
  - Wasatch Formation of the western United States
- Itaboraian formations
  - Itaboraí Formation of Brazil
  - Laguna del Hunco Formation of Argentina
