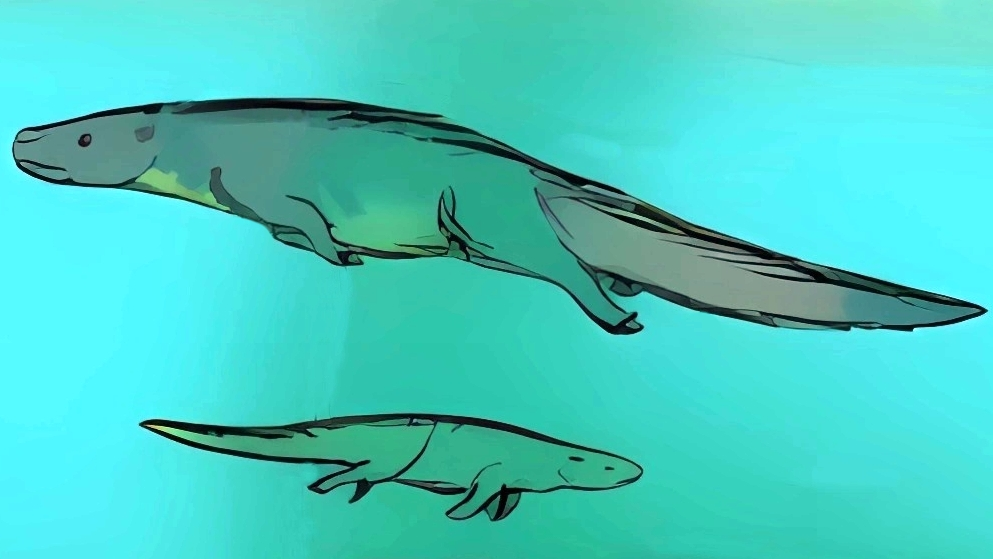
- H. macrodontus and H. hebetis

Scientific classification
- Kingdom: Animalia
- Phylum: Chordata
- Class: Mammalia
- Infraclass: Placentalia
- Order: †Mesonychia
- Family: †Mesonychidae
- Genus: †Honanodon; Chow, 1965

Species
- H. hebetis; H. macrodontus

= Honanodon =

Honanodon Temporal range: Middle Eocene–Late Eocene

Extinct genus of mammal

Honanodon is an extinct genus of mesonychid mesonychian found Middle to Late Eocene strata of China and Pakistan.

Species of Honanodon were originally described as hapalodectids of small to large sizes based on jaw fragments and teeth. However, because the lower molars do not have grooves diagnostic of Hapalodectidae, the genus has been referred to Mesonychidae.

== Species ==
- Genus Honanodon
  - Honanodon hebetis
  - Honanodon macrodontus
