= Ergilian =

Geological time period

The Ergilian age is an Asian Land Mammal Age (~37.8–33.9 Ma) within the Late Eocene epoch of the Paleogene. It follows the Ulangochuian and precedes the Houldjinian age.

The Ergilian age is named after the Ergilian Dzo fossil formations in Mongolia. In China specifically, the name Baiyinian has been proposed for Ergilian-equivalent strata. The Ergilian corresponds to the Chadronian in North America.
