= Zhou Mingzhen =

Chinese paleomammalogist and vertebrate paleontologist

Zhou Mingzhen (Chinese: 周明镇; 9 November 1918 – 4 January 1996), also known as Minchen Chow, was a Chinese paleomammalogist and vertebrate paleontologist. He was an academician of the Chinese Academy of Sciences, and a research professor for mammalian paleontology in the Institute of Vertebrate Paleontology and Paleoanthropology (IVPP) in Beijing. He received the Romer-Simpson Medal in 1993.

== Biography ==
Zhou was born in Shanghai, China, and graduated from Chongqing University in Sichuan, in 1943. He received an MSc degree from the University of Miami, in 1948, and a Ph.D. degree from Lehigh University, in 1950. He became an associate professor at Shandong University, in 1952 and joined the Institute of Vertebrate Paleontology and Paleoanthropology (IVPP) of the Chinese Academy of Sciences in Beijing, where he remained until his death, in 1996. He was the Chinese leader of the "Sino-Soviet (Paleontological) Expedition" to northwestern China in 1959–1960. In 1979, Zhou became an honorary member of the Society of Vertebrate Paleontology (SVP). He became an academician of the Chinese Academy of Sciences, in 1980 and in 1993 was awarded the SVP's Romer-Simpson Medal for "sustained and outstanding scholarly excellence and service to the discipline of vertebrate paleontology". He was an early and effective advocate of cladistic approaches to paleobiology in China, beginning in the early 1980s and promoted study abroad and academic training for young Chinese paleontologists, in the 1980s and 1990s.

== Family ==
Zhou was married to Chai Meichen (柴梅尘) and had two sons, Zhou Ximeng (周西蒙, born 1940) and Zhou Xiqin (周西芹). Zhou and his family were severely persecuted during the Cultural Revolution. He underwent repeated struggle sessions and made several suicide attempts. His elder son Ximeng killed himself in 1968 after being denounced as a "counterrevolutionary". Chai Meichen suffered from depression and hanged herself in 1993.
