= Ulangochuian =

The Ulangochuian age is an Asian Land Mammal Age (~39.9–37.8 Ma) within the Late Eocene epoch of the Paleogene. It follows the Sharamurunian and precedes the Ergilian age.
