= Irdinmanhan =

The Irdinmanhan age is a period of geologic time (47.8–42.7 Ma) within the Middle Eocene epoch of the Paleogene used more specifically with Asian Land Mammal Ages. It follows the Arshantan and precedes the Sharamurunian age.

The Irdinmanhan age is named after the Irdin Manha Formation.
