= Walter W. Granger =

American paleontologist (1872–1941)

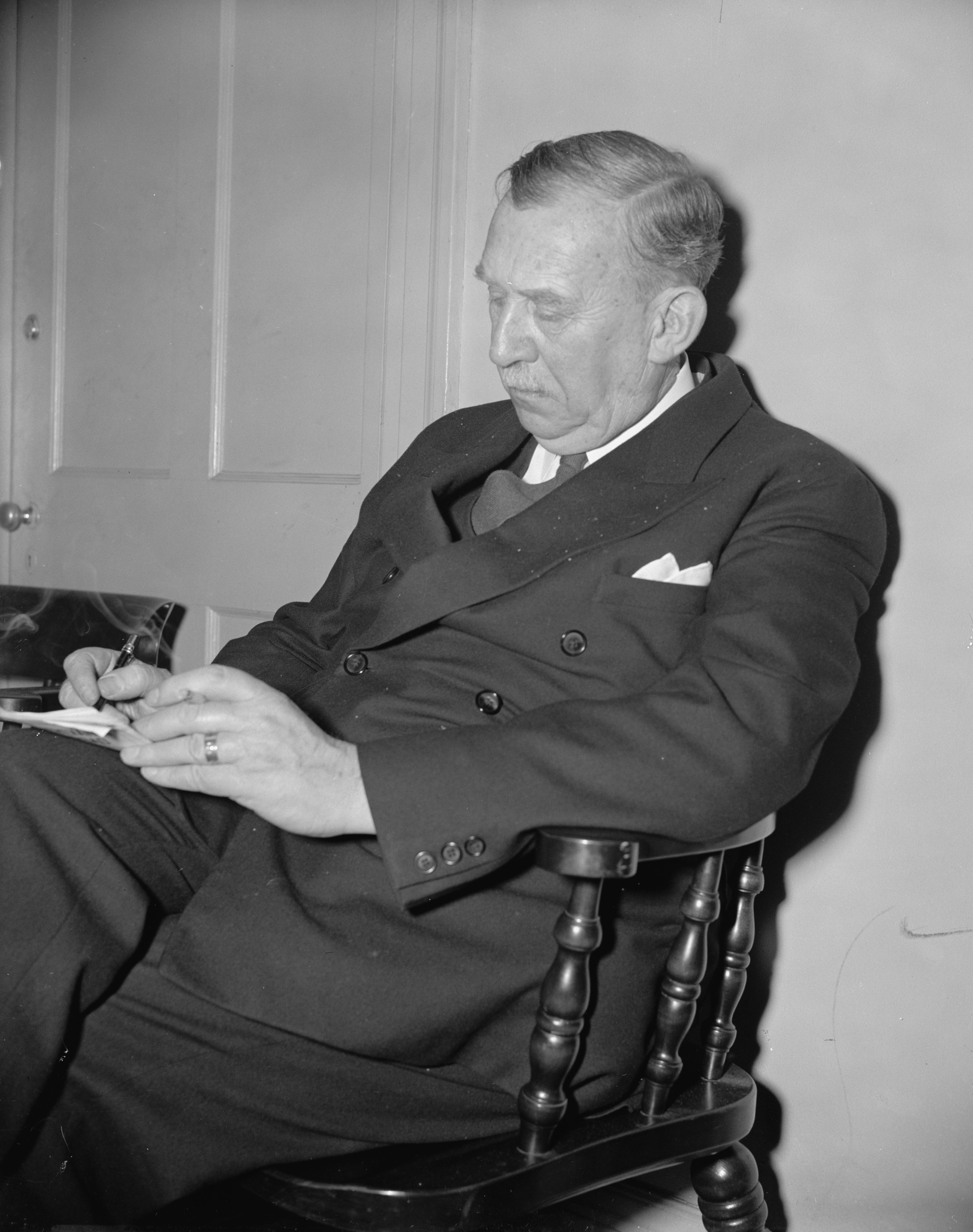
- Granger in 1939
- Born: Walter Willis Granger; November 7, 1872; Middletown Springs, Vermont
- Died: September 6, 1941 (aged 68); Lusk, Wyoming
- Education: Middlebury College (honorary doctorate, 1932)
- Known for: Prolific collecting of fossil vertebrates in Wyoming, New Mexico, Fayum (Egypt), China and Mongolia. Dinosaur discoveries include Velociraptor, Oviraptor, and Protoceratops.
- Scientific career
- Fields: Paleontology
- Workplaces: American Museum of Natural History

Walter Willis Granger (November 7, 1872 – September 6, 1941) was an American vertebrate paleontologist who participated in important fossil explorations in the United States, Egypt, China and Mongolia.

== Early life and career ==
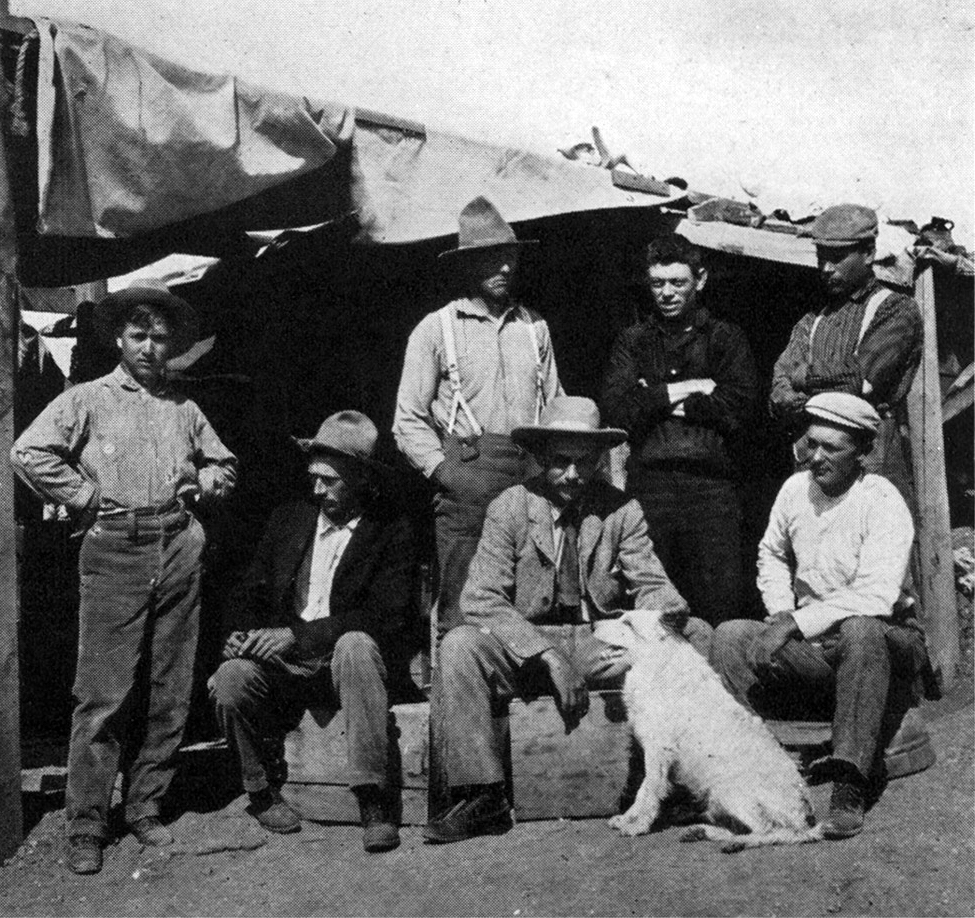
Granger (seated left) with an 1899 American Museum expedition

Born in Middletown Springs, Vermont, Granger was the first of five children born to Charles H. Granger, an insurance agent and veteran of the American Civil War, and Ada Byron Haynes Granger. Granger developed an early interest in taxidermy; and in 1890, at age 17, he moved to New York City and obtained a job working as a taxidermist with a friend of his father's at the American Museum of Natural History in New York City. Working in the field with the museum's expeditions in the American West in 1894 and 1895, Granger became interested in hunting fossils. In 1896, he joined the museum's Department of Vertebrate Paleontology as an assistant. In 1909, he became an assistant curator, then an associate curator in 1911. In 1897, on an expedition to Wyoming, he discovered Bone Cabin Quarry near Laramie. Over the next eight years, the site yielded the fossils of 64 dinosaurs, including specimens of Brontosaurus, Stegosaurus, Allosaurus and Apatosaurus, and he published his first scientific paper on this collection in 1901 with Henry Fairfield Osborn.

News of German and British vertebrate fossil discoveries in Egypt led Granger to embark in 1907 with Osborn on the first American fossil hunt outside North America. The Fayum region of Egypt contained one of the most complete assemblages of Cenozoic animals yet found and yielded a collection of specimens that enhanced the museum's reputation as well as Granger's.

== Later career ==
As assistant curator of the museum's Department of Vertebrate Paleontology, Granger was sufficiently free of administrative duties that for many years he could spend an average of five months a year in the field, mostly in the American West, as well as write two or three important papers each year. In 1921, he went to China and Mongolia as chief paleontologist of the museum's third expedition there. Under the direction of Johan Gunnar Andersson, Granger helped open and begin excavating the site at Zhoukoudian that yielded "Peking Man" (Homo erectus pekinensis). The initial discovery of a hominid tooth at Zhoukoudian was made in 1921 by another paleontologist, Otto Zdansky.

Granger's work in China also took him to the Three Gorges area of the Yangtze River, but his five expeditions in 1922, 1923, 1925, 1927 and 1928 into the Gobi Desert of Mongolia in association with the legendary Roy Chapman Andrews led to Granger's most famous discoveries, including Velociraptor, Oviraptor and Protoceratops, dinosaur finds that the public tended to associate with the more famous Andrews.

Granger became Curator of Fossil Mammals at the museum in 1927 and also took the post of Curator of Paleontology in the museum's Department of Asiatic Exploration and Research. In 1935, he became president of the prestigious Explorers Club.

Although Granger was one of the foremost paleontologists of his time, he did not receive a formal academic degree until 1932 when Middlebury College in Vermont awarded him an honorary doctorate.

== Personal life ==
Granger married a cousin, Anna Deane Granger (1874–1952), in 1904. They had no children. Granger died in 1941 of heart failure in Lusk, Wyoming, while on a field expedition. His ashes were scattered on his mother's grave in Pleasant View Cemetery in his hometown of Middletown Springs, Vermont.

== Legacy ==
Granger's career was one of solid accomplishment in the field of collecting and analyzing fossils. Involved with some of the most important dinosaurian and mammalian fossil discoveries of his time, he labored mostly outside the public's eye, respected by his peers as possibly, in the words of his colleague George Gaylord Simpson, "the greatest collector of fossil vertebrates that ever lived." Following Granger's death, the museum renamed its Asiatic Hall of Fossils the "Walter Granger Memorial Hall."

Lophocion grangeri, a phenacodontid from the Paleocene of Wyoming, was named after Granger, who find the type specimen in 1912.
