= Sharamurunian =

Period of geologic time within the Middle Eocene epoch of the Paleogene

The Sharamurunian age is an Asian Land Mammal Age (~42.7–39.9 Ma) within the Middle to Late Eocene epoch of the Paleogene. It follows the Irdinmanhan age and precedes the Ulangochuian age. The Sharamurunian is named after the Shara Murun Formation.
