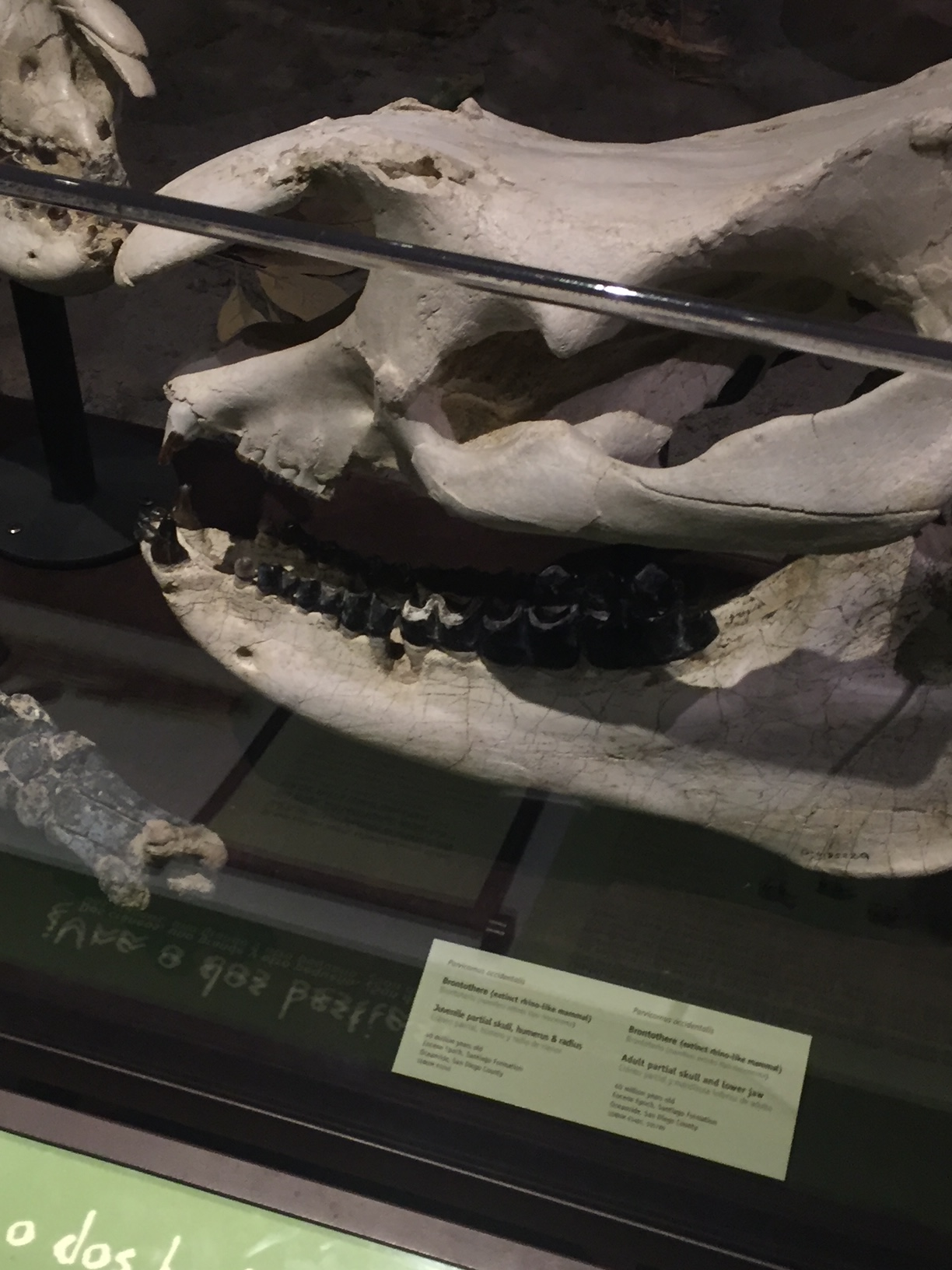
- Skull of P. occidentalis at the San Diego Natural History Museum

Scientific classification
- Kingdom: Animalia
- Phylum: Chordata
- Class: Mammalia
- Infraclass: Placentalia
- Order: Perissodactyla
- Family: †Brontotheriidae
- Subfamily: †Brontotheriinae
- Tribe: †Brontotheriini
- Subtribe: †Brontotheriina
- Infratribe: †Brontotheriita
- Genus: †Parvicornus; Mihlbachler & Deméré, 2009
- Species: †P. occidentalis

Binomial name
- †Parvicornus occidentalis Mihlbachler & Deméré, 2009

= Parvicornus =

Parvicornus Temporal range: Middle–Late Eocene (Duchesnean), 40.1–37 Ma

Extinct genus of mammals

Parvicornus (lit. 'little horn') is an extinct genus of horned brontothere that lived in western North America during the Middle to Late Eocene, in the Duchesnean land mammal age. A single species is known, P. occidentalis, from the Santiago Formation in southern California. Fossils possibly belonging to Parvicornus have also been found in North Dakota and Texas. Parvicornus was smaller than most of the other horned brontotheres of Eocene North America but still a large animal, about the same size as the modern-day black rhinoceros.

== Research history ==
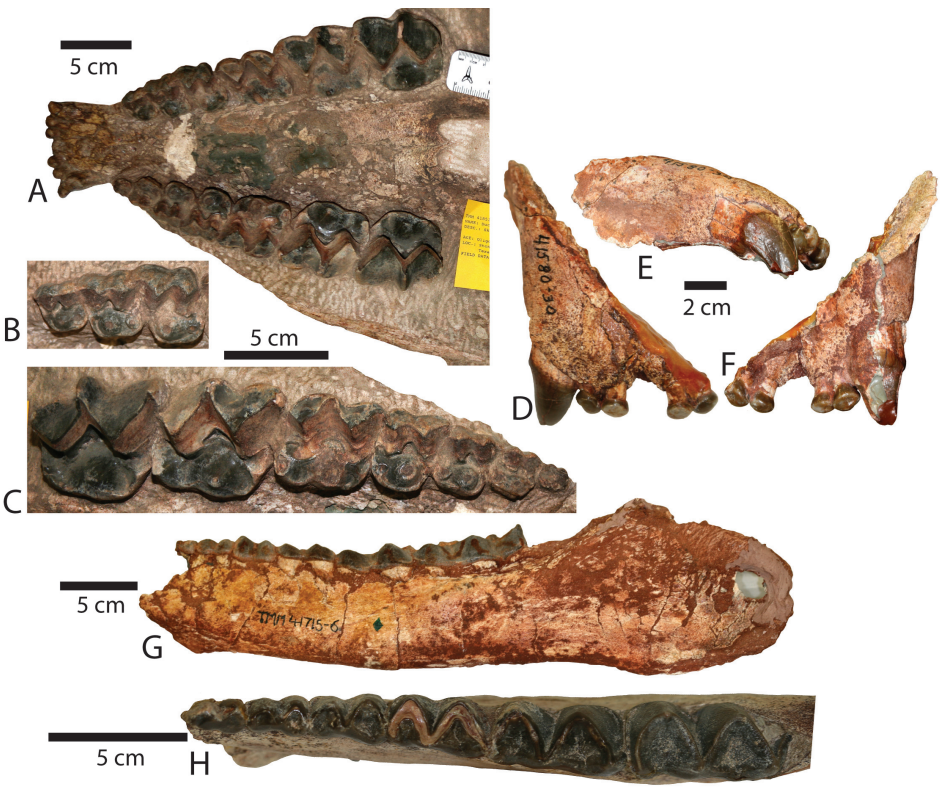
Fossils from Devil's Graveyard Formation in Texas possibly belonging to Parvicornus: TMM 41853-17 (A–C), TMM 41580-30 (D–F), TMM 41715-6 (G), and TMM 41715-6 (H)

The known fossils of Parvicornus occidentalis were discovered in October–November 2001, during the construction of the Ocean Ranch Corporate Centre (ORCC) in Oceanside, San Diego County, California. The construction excavations recovered abundant fossil remains, including several skulls and mandibles, with preserved dentition, as well as postcranial remains. Geologically, the fossils are from the upper portion Member C of the Santiago Formation. The upper portion of member C is often informally called the "Bone Sands". The fossils were described as a new taxon by Matthew C. Mihlbachler and Thomas A. Deméré in 2009. The genus name Parvicornus means "little horn", derived from Latin parvus ("little") and cornu ("horn"), and refer to its small nasal horns. The species name occidentalis is derived from the Latin occidens ("west"), referring to the fossils having been found on the western coast of North America. The holotype specimen of P. occidentalis is SDSNH 107667, a partially crushed but nearly complete skull.

It is possible that Parvicornus or very closely related animals ranged beyond California. The specimen SDSM 63690, a premaxillo-maxillary rostrum with several teeth, from the Slim Buttes Formation in North Dakota was referred to the dubious species Teleodus thyboi by Philip R. Bjork in 1967. This fossil preserves some features characteristic of P. occidentalis, including semiglobular tooth crowns on the upper incisors, but is too fragmentary to confidently refer to the genus.

In 2021, Mihlbachler and Donald Prothero suggested that several incomplete Duchesnean brontothere fossils from the Skyline Channels of the Devil's Graveyard Formation, in Brewster County, Texas, could belong to P. occidentalis. These included two cranial fossils (TMM 41853-17 and TMM 41580-30) and two mandibular fossils (TMM 41715-6 and TMM 41715-6), previously identified with Duchesneodus uintensis. This tentative classification was based on some features that appeared to agree better with P. occidentalis, such as the weakly arched shape of the row of incisors, and the position of the posterior margin of the mandibular symphysis.

== Description ==
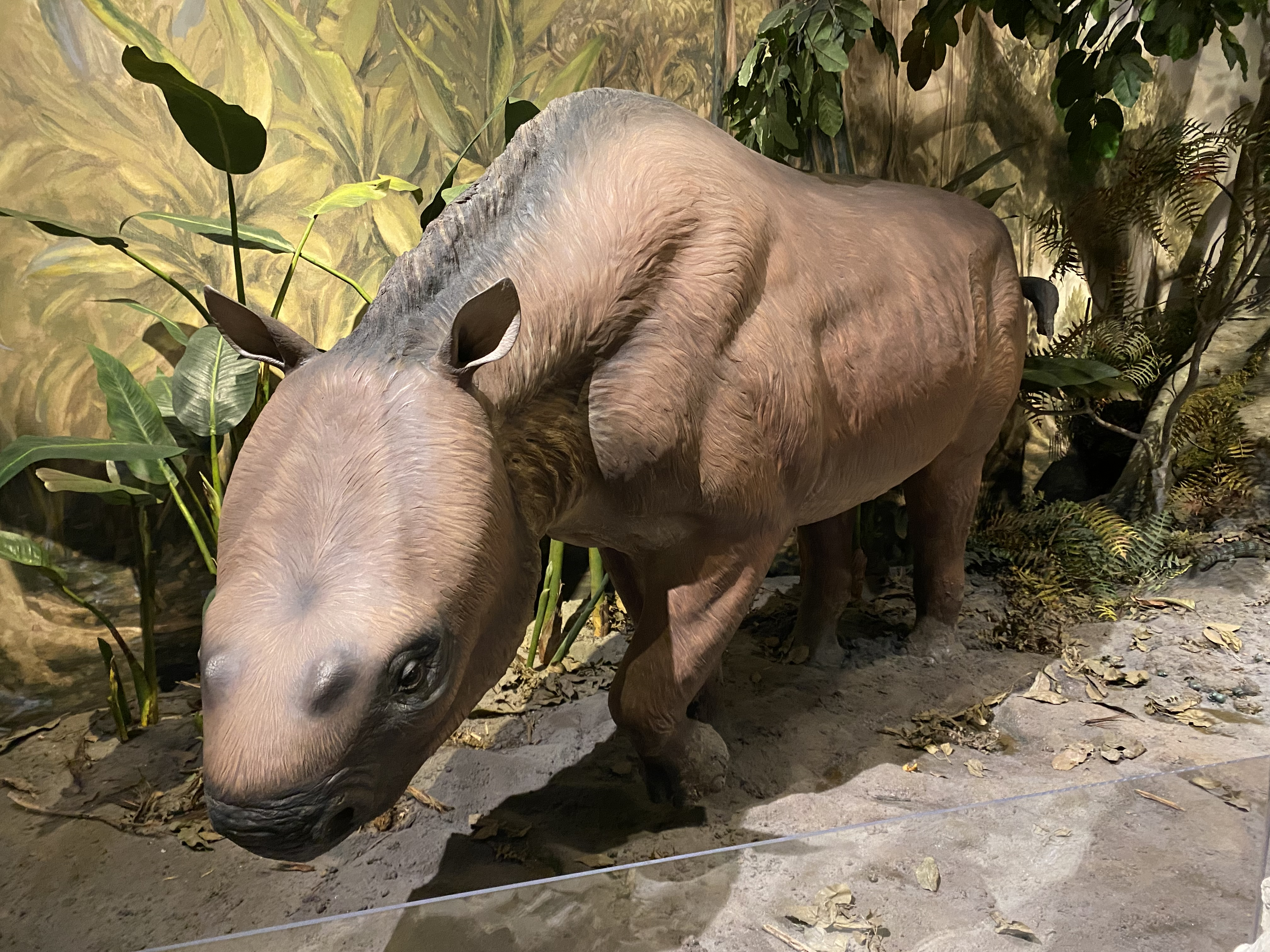
Model of P. occidentalis at the San Diego Natural History Museum

Parvicornus occidentalis was a large-bodied brontothere and grew to roughly the same size as the modern-day black rhinoceros, standing 5–6 feet (1.5–1.8 meters) high at the shoulder. Parvicornus has been estimated to have reached a body mass of 860 kilograms (1,900 lb). Parvicornus was smaller in size than most of the other horned brontotheres of Eocene North America. Some larger genera were in a similar size range, such as Duchesneodus and Diplacodon.

Parvicornus had a saddle-shaped skull and short frontonasal horns, positioned anterodorsally to (close to above, but slightly to the front of) the eyes. Like other brontotheres of the infratribe Brontotheriita, the incisors of Parvicornus were reduced in both size and number. P. occidentalis had the dental formula 2.1.4.33.1.4.3 and was one of few brontotheres (alongside Duchesneodus and Eubrontotherium) to have three pairs of lower incisors yet only two pairs of upper incisors.

Because Parvicornus is known from a number of fossils, some details of its ontogeny is apparent in the fossil assemblage. The depth of the nasal incision in the skull, and the position where the nasal cavity ends seems to fluctuate in the skulls based on dental wear and eruption. Like some other brontotheres, Parvicornus tended to lose incisors with age. The mandible SDSNH 107733 has heavily worn teeth and just two pairs of lower incisors. The robustness of the skull and size of the horns vary slightly between specimens, possibly due to sexual dimorphism.

== Classification ==
Parvicornus is classified as part of the infratribe Brontotheriita, alongside the genera Dianotitan, Duchesneodus, Eubrontotherium, Megacerops, Notiotitanops, Parabrontops and Protitanops. The Brontotheriita were a sister group to the infratribe Embolotheriita, which includes genera such as Embolotherium, Metatitan and Gnathotitan. Parvicornus was a basal member of the Brontotheriita, and is unique in the group in that it retained several primitive features in its incisors, including that its upper incisors have semiglobular crowns, and that the incisors are strongly anteriorly arched. Among the Brontotheriita, Parvicornus has close phylogenetic ties to Protitanops and Eubrontotherium, genera also known from western North America.

The cladogram below follows a strict reduced consensus of the Brontotheriidae from the description of P. occidentalis, reduced to show just the Brontotheriina subtribe.

- - Brontotheriina
    - Protitan grangeri
    - Protitan minor
    - - Protitanotherium emarginatum
      - Rhinotitan kaiseni
      - Rhinotitan andrewsi
      - - Pachytitan ajax
        - Diplacodon elatus
        - Brontotheriita
          - Parabrontops gobiensis
          - - Eubrontotherium clarnoensis
            - Protitanops curryi
            - Parvicornus occidentalis
            - - Notiotitanops mississippiensis
              - Dianotitan lunanensis
              - Duchesneodus uintensis
              - Megacerops coloradensis
              - Megacerops kuwagatarhinus
      - Embolotheriita
        - Pygmaetitan panxianensis
        - - Aktautitan hippopotamopus
          - - Pollyosbornia altidens
            - Gnathotitan berkeyi
        - - Brachydiastematherium transylvanicum
          - Metatitan khaitshinus
          - - Metatitan primus
            - Metatitan relictus
        - - Nasamplus progressus
          - - Protembolotherium efremovi
            - - Embolotherium andrewsi
              - Embolotherium grangeri

== Paleoecology ==
The "Bone Sands" of the Santiago Formation are correlated to the Duchesnean land mammal age of North America. The "Bone Sands" preserve fossils of various Duchesnean mammals, including two species of the predatory Hyaenodon (H. venturae and H. sp.), the equid Epihippus, a pantolestid similar to Simidectes, and several rodents (including Griphomys, Simimys, Metanoiamys, Pareumys, Eohaplomys, Microparamys, and Rapamys). The rodent fauna suggests that the "Bone Sands" fauna could be correlated with the Duchesnean Pearson Ranch Local Fauna, found in the Sespe Formation of Ventura County, California.

Parvicornus was a browser and would have fed on the leaves and twigs of plants, which were abundant in its environment.
