= Pachytitan =

Pachytitan Temporal range: Middle–Late Eocene (Sharamurunian), 42.7–39.9 Ma
- Type skull of P. ajax (AMNH 21612)

Scientific classification
- Kingdom: Animalia
- Phylum: Chordata
- Class: Mammalia
- Order: Perissodactyla
- Family: †Brontotheriidae
- Subfamily: †Brontotheriinae
- Tribe: †Brontotheriini
- Subtribe: †Brontotheriina
- Genus: †Pachytitan; Granger & Gregory, 1943
- Species: †P. ajax

Binomial name
- †Pachytitan ajax Granger & Gregory, 1943

Extinct genus of mammals

Pachytitan (lit. 'thick titan') is an extinct genus of horned brontothere that lived in East Asia during the Middle to Late Eocene, in the Sharamurunian land mammal age. The genus contains a single species, P. ajax, known from a partial skull found in the Shara Murun Formation of Inner Mongolia, China.

Pachytitan was a very large brontothere, surpassing two tonnes in weight, and had two relatively robust horns in front of its eyes. Pachytitan may also have had a distinctly upturned nasal process, though this may also only seem to be the case due to conjectural reconstruction of the type specimen. Pachytitan was a relatively primitive horned brontothere, likely similar to Rhinotitan but with a more advanced dentition reminiscent of that of genera such as Diplacodon.

== Research history ==
Pachytitan ajax was described by Walter W. Granger and William King Gregory in 1943, based on the partial skull AMNH 21612, found in the Baron Sog Mesa in Inner Mongolia, China, in deposits of the Shara Murun Formation. Granger and Gregory found AMNH 21612 to be quite close in its upper cheek teeth measurements to Rhinotitan andrewsi, but much larger in size. They further distinguished Pachytitan from Rhinotitan by its massive and slightly upturned nasals, its larger and more swelled horns, and its more advanced premolars. Granger and Gregory noted the possibility that Pachytitan could be associated with the genus Titanodectes, known only from large lower jaws, but found that the proportions of several teeth precluded the two being congeneric.

In 2008, Matthew C. Mihlbachler noted that several of the features used by Granger and Gregory to distinguish Pachytitan from Rhinotitan were of dubious usefulness. Horn size is variable in many brontothere species, and a poor feature for distinguishing species. Furthermore, AMNH 21612 is relatively poorly preserved, and the apparent upturned nasals of the specimen may be a conjectural reconstruction; much of the specimen is reconstructed with plaster. Mihlbachler nevertheless supported the status of Pachytitan ajax as a distinct genus and species, noting that its premolars were more molarized than those of Rhinotitan, and more similar to those of Diplacodon, and more derived genera such as Embolotherium and Parabrontops. Although dentally similar to Diplacodon, Mihlbachler found Pachytitan to differ in its deep lateral nasal walls, strongly angled ventromedially (towards the front and middle), a feature Pachytitan instead shares with Rhinotitan.

== Description ==
Pachytitan was a very large brontothere. In 2023, Oscar Sanisidro, Mihlbachler, and Juan L. Cantalapiedra estimated P. ajax to have weighed 2,351.5 kilograms (5,184 lb).

=== Skull ===
Pachytitan had an unelevated and relatively broad nasal process, which was thick, strongly rounded, and anteriorly (towards the front) downturned. Per the original description, the nasal process may have been slightly upturned, though Mihlbachler doubted whether this had been the case prior to reconstruction. The premaxillomaxillary rostrum (the part of the jaw extending below the nasal incision) deepened posteriorly (towards the back). Pachytitan had large and robust, but relatively short, horns. The nasal incision of Pachytitan appears to have been relatively deep, similar to Rhinotitan, but its true depth is unclear due to plaster reconstruction of the fossil.

=== Dentition ===
AMNH 21612 preserves only some of the left upper dentition, including the third incisor, canine, and second premolar to third molar. Assuming the other incisors are similar to the third incisor, the incisors of Pachytitan were large or intermediate-sized. There was a distinct metacone on the second premolar. The premolars of Pachytitan had well-developed hypocones, only weakly connected to the protocones, and were as such more molarized than the premolars of Rhinotitan, and closer to the premolars of genera such as Diplacodon. The molars had tall ectolophs (one of the ridges across the tooth), with labial (towards the lips) walls angled towards the tongue.

== Classification ==
In 1943, Granger and Gregory classified Pachytitan in the brontothere subfamily "Epimanteoceratinae", alongside Rhinotitan. In 1997, Malcolm McKenna and Susan K. Bell placed Pachytitan (alongside both Rhinotitan and Epimanteoceras) in the subfamily "Brontopinae". Mihlbachler established a new internal taxonomy of brontotheres in 2008, and recovered Pachytitan as part of the subtribe (and clade) Brontotheriina, which includes all of the horned brontotheres. Mihlbachler (2008) recovered Pachytitan as a close relative of Diplacodon, with the two being sister taxa to the derived infratribe Brontotheriita. In 2021, Mihlbachler and Donald Prothero recovered Pachytitan and Diplacodon as slightly more basal, not closer to Brontotheriita than they were to the other derived infratribe Embolotheriita.

Topology A: Mihlbachler (2008)

- Brontotheriina
  - Protitan grangeri
  - Protitan minor
  - - Protitanotherium emarginatum
    - - - Rhinotitan kaiseni
        - Rhinotitan andrewsi
      - - Pachytitan ajax
        - Diplacodon elatus
        - Brontotheriita
          ⊞
          - Parabrontops gobiensis
          - Protitanops curryi
          - - Eubrontotherium clarnoensis
            - - Dianotitan lunanensis
              - Duchesneodus uintensis
              - - Megacerops coloradensis
                - Megacerops kuwagatarhinus
          ⊟
      - Embolotheriita
        ⊞
        - - Aktautitan hippopotamopus
          - - Pollyosbornia altidens
            - Gnathotitan berkeyi
        - - Pygmaetitan panxianensis
          - - Brachydiastematherium transylvanicum
            - Metatitan khaitshinus
            - - Metatitan primus
              - Metatitan relictus
          - - Nasamplus progressus
            - - Protembolotherium efremovi
              - - Embolotherium andrewsi
                - Embolotherium grangeri
        ⊟

Topology B: Mihlbachler & Prothero (2021)

- Brontotheriina
  - Epimanteoceras mae
  - - Protitan grangeri
    - Protitan minor
  - - Rhinotitan kaiseni
    - - Rhinotitan andrewsi
      - Brontotheriita
        ⊞
        - Parabrontops gobiensis
        - Eubrontotherium clarnoensis
        - Parvicornus occidentalis
        - - Protitanops curryi
          - - Dianotitan lunanensis
            - - Duchesneodus uintensis
              - - Megacerops coloradensis
                - Megacerops kuwagatarhinus
        ⊟
      - Protitanotherium emarginatum
      - Pachytitan ajax
      - - Diplacodon elatus
        - Diplacodon gigan
      - Embolotheriita
        ⊞
        - - Aktautitan hippopotamopus
          - - Pollyosbornia altidens
            - Gnathotitan berkeyi
        - - Pygmaetitan panxianensis
          - - Brachydiastematherium transylvanicum
            - Metatitan khaitshinus
            - - Metatitan primus
              - Metatitan relictus
          - - Nasamplus progressus
            - - Protembolotherium efremovi
              - - Embolotherium andrewsi
                - Embolotherium grangeri
        ⊟

== Paleoecology ==
The Erlian Basin, in which the Shara Murun Formation is situated, experienced a subtropical and humid climate during the Eocene. The vegetation was highly diverse and dominated by deciduous trees and shrubs. The Sharamurunian fauna was broadly similar to the faunas of the preceding Arshantan and Irdinmanhan land mammal ages. A notable exception was the disappearance and near-disappearance of several archaic groups, such pantodonts and dinoceratans. Perissodactyl diversity is noted to have been very high, especially in the case of brontotheres and amynodonts.

Pachytitan coexisted with several other large brontotheres, including Parabrontops, Rhinotitan, and Titanodectes. Other taxa included amynodonts such as Cadurcodon and Sharamynodon, entelodonts (Brachyhyops), paraceratheres (Juxia), various primitive rhinocerotoids (Pappaceras, Triplopus), tapiroids (Deperetella), and primitive ruminants (Lophiomeryx). Sharamurunian predators included animals such as the large mesonychid Mongolestes, and hyaenodonts ("Pterodon" hyaenoides).
