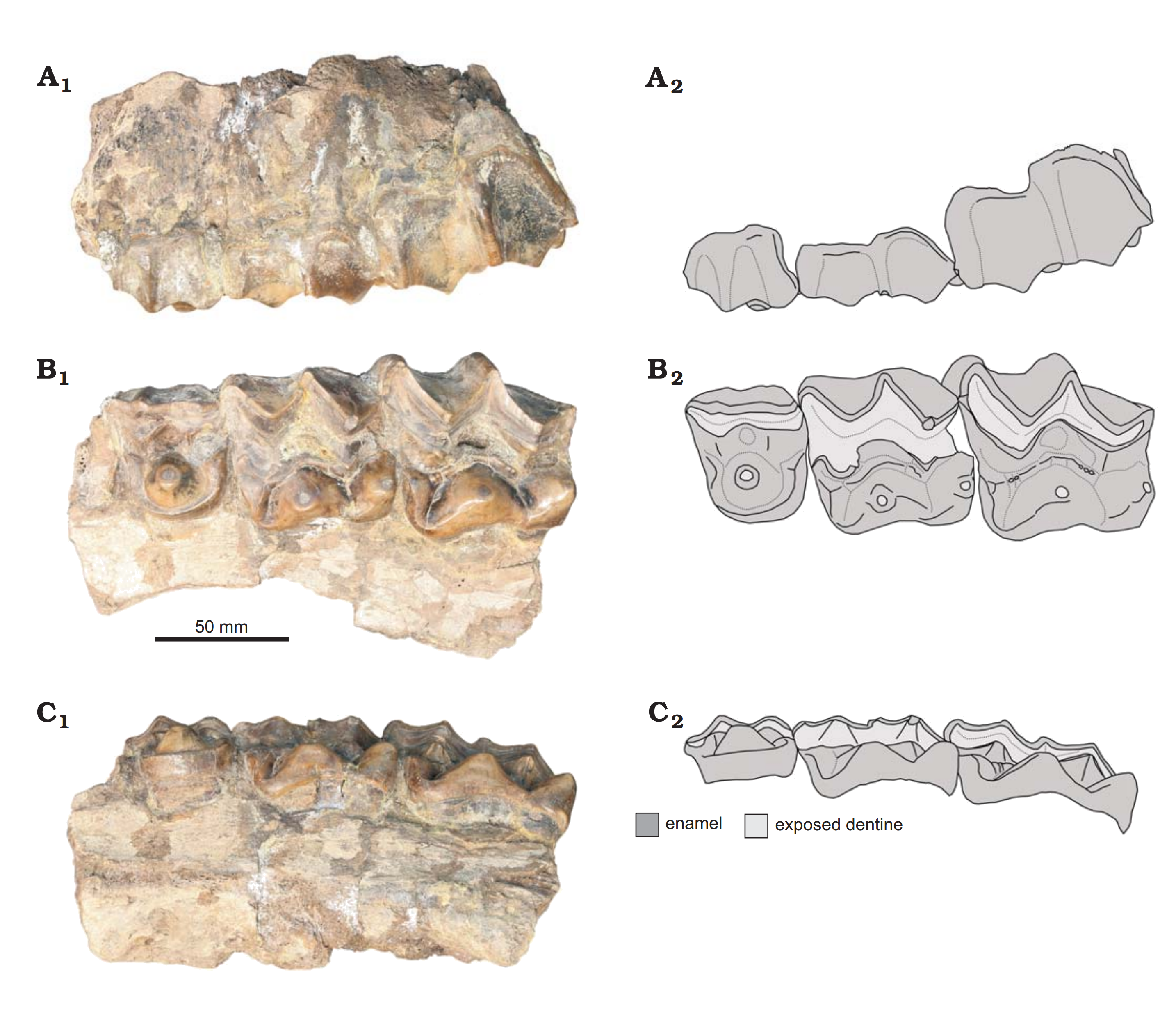
- Holotype maxilla of M. paganus (SYSU-M-4, holotype), with drawings of just the tooth crowns

Scientific classification
- Kingdom: Animalia
- Phylum: Chordata
- Class: Mammalia
- Infraclass: Placentalia
- Order: Perissodactyla
- Family: †Brontotheriidae
- Subfamily: †Brontotheriinae
- Tribe: †Brontotheriini
- Subtribe: †Brontotheriina
- Infratribe: †Embolotheriita
- Genus: †Maobrontops; Averianov et al., 2018
- Species: †M. paganus

Binomial name
- †Maobrontops paganus Averianov et al., 2018

= Maobrontops =

Maobrontops Temporal range: Late Eocene

Extinct genus of mammals

Maobrontops (lit. 'Mao(ming) thunder face') is an extinct genus of horned brontothere that lived in East Asia during the Late Eocene. A single species is known, M. paganus, from the Youganwo Formation in Guangdong, China. Maobrontops is known only from a single poorly-preserved maxilla.

== Research history ==
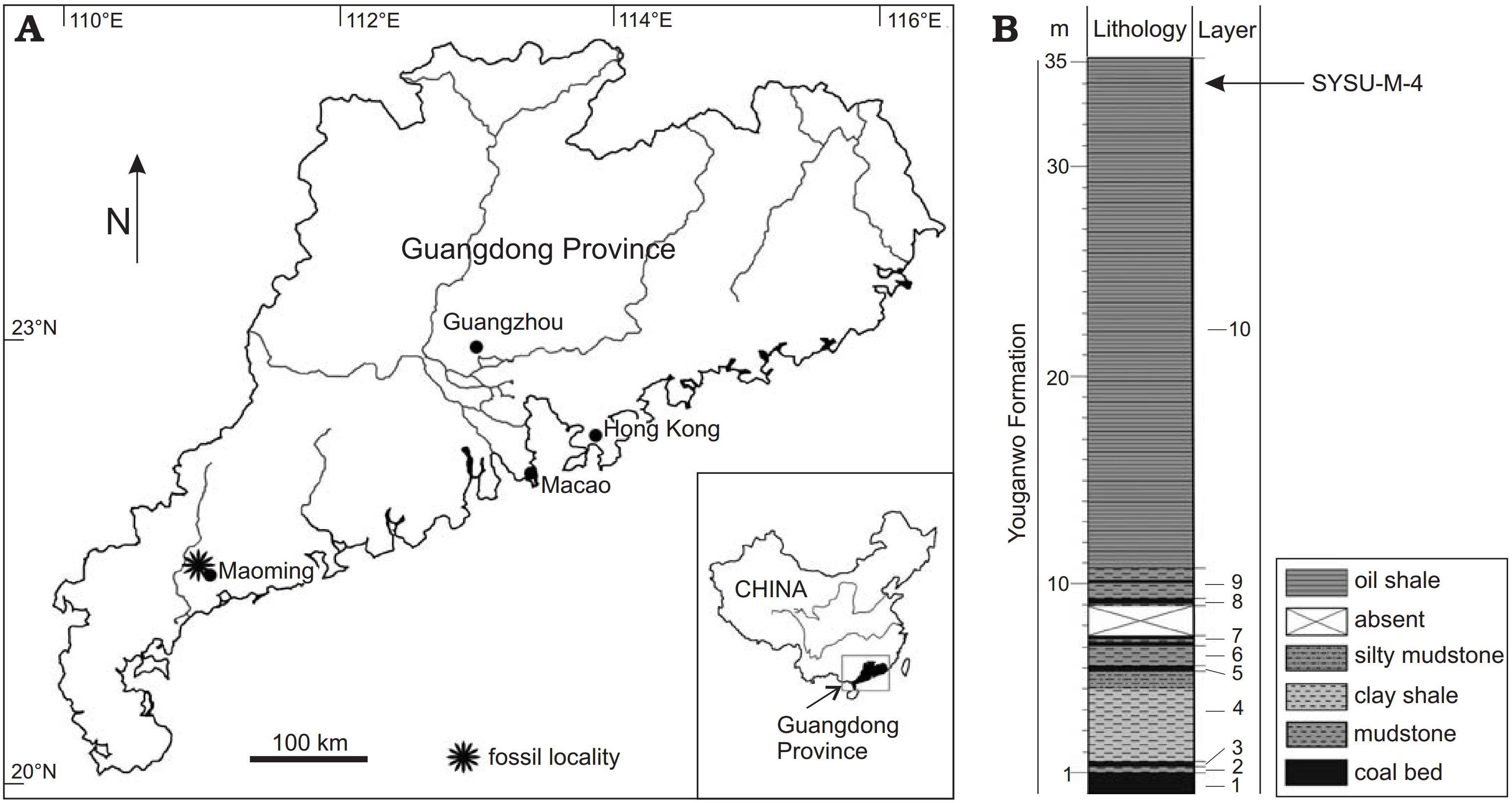
Location where SYSU-M-4 was found in Guangdong, China

Maobrontops paganus was described in 2018 by Alexander O. Averianov, Igor Danilov, Wen Chen, and Jianhua Jin. The new genus and species were based on the fragmentary left maxilla SYSU-M-4, found in an oil shale quarry near Maoming in Guangdong, China. The genus name Maobrontops derives from Maoming and the genus Brontops (now considered a synonym of Megacerops). The name Brontops itself means "thunder face", from Ancient Greek βροντή (thunder) and ὤψ (face). (Note: Brontops has also been interpreted as "resembling Brontotherium", as in "having the face of Bronto(therium)". Brontotherium is also considered a synonym of Megacerops.) The species name paganus is Latin for "rustic" and references that many fossils in the vicinity of Maoming are collected by locals. SYSU-M-4 represents the southernmost known record of brontotheres in China.

SYSU-M-4 preserves only three of the teeth: the fourth premolar, and the first and second molar. There are also traces of the third premolar, though it is mostly destroyed. The maxilla was identified as belonging to a brontothere by the molars having W-shaped ectolophs (outer shearing blades), a distinctive feature of brontothere teeth, and the lingual cusps (tooth cusps in the direction of the tongue) being isolated from each other. Further dental features suggested that Maobrontops was a derived brontothere, placed in the Embolotheriita infratribe.

== Description ==
SYSU-M-4 is poorly preserved and offers little to no information on the appearance and anatomy of the rest of the jaw or skull. As a genus, Maobrontops is characterized mainly by combining a relatively simple fourth premolar that does not have a hypocone (one of the cusps) with relatively derived molars with large cusps on the anterolingual (towards the front of the tooth and on the side of the tongue) cingula.

=== Size ===
Maobrontops was a large brontothere. Averianov et al. estimated Maobrontops to have been larger than Protembolotherium but smaller than Embolotherium, based on the size of its teeth. The table below shows dental measurements (in millimeters) for Maobrontops (from Averianov et al., 2018) and the largest values for Embolotherium and Protembolotherium (from Mihlbachler, 2008).

| Species | P4 (Note: Fourth premolar) L × W | M1 (Note: First molar) L × W | M2 (Note: Second molar) L × W |
|---|---|---|---|
| Maobrontops paganus | 42.1 × 49.0 | 56.1 × 57.4 | 73.3 × 69.8 |
| Embolotherium grangeri | 40.9 × 35.5 | 71.7 × 45.3 | 86.9 × 49.8 |
| Embolotherium andrewsi | 48.6 × 35.6 | 55.5 × 39.8 | 79.9 × 52.2 |
| Protembolotherium efremovi | 38.5 × 46.1 | 46.2 × 50 | 69.4 × 68.3 |

Based on equations on perissodactyl body size based on the length and width of the second molar by Christine Janis, Averianov et al. estimated the body mass of the type specimen of M. paganus at 792 kilograms (1,746 lb). This estimate may be quite low; in 2023, Oscar Sanisidro, Matthew C. Mihlbachler, and Juan L. Cantalapiedra estimated the body masses based on first molar size of Protembolotherium at 2,584 kilograms (5,697 lb), Embolotherium grangeri at 3,449 kilograms (7,604 lb) and Embolotherium andrewsi at 2,705 kilograms (5,964 lb).

== Classification ==
Averianov et al. performed a phylogenetic analysis to determine the position of Maobrontops. They used a matrix and character coding from a 2016 study by Matthew C. Mihlbachler and Joshua X. Samuels, but noted that very few characters could be coded for the fragmentary Maobrontops (19 out of 91). Averianov et al. recovered Maobrontops as the sister taxon to the derived clade that includes the genera Embolotherium, Nasamplus, and Protembolotherium. Other than support from the phylogenetic analysis, the large cusps on the anterolingual cingula of the upper molar teeth is the only anatomical trait that securely unites Maobrontops with these genera. Averianov et al.'s cladogram is shown below:

- Embolotheriita
  - - Aktautitan hippopotamopus
    - - Pollyosbornia altidens
      - Gnathotitan berkeyi
  - - - Brachydiastematherium transylvanicum
      - Metatitan khaitshinus
      - - Metatitan primus
        - Metatitan relictus
    - - Pygmaetitan panxianensis
      - - Maobrontops paganus
        - - Nasamplus progressus
          - - Protembolotherium efremovi
            - - Embolotherium andrewsi
              - Embolotherium grangeri

If Maobrontops is intermediate in size between Protembolotherium and Embolotherium, it may suggest that brontotheres in southern and northern China evolved large body sizes independently since both of those genera are known from the north.

In 2023, Oscar Sanisidro, Mihlbachler, and Juan L. Cantalapiedra suggested that Maobrontops paganus could represent the same taxon as the fragmentary and dubious brontothere Sivatitanops birmanicum.

== Paleoecology ==
M. paganus is known from the upper part of the Youganwo Formation; the type specimen was found in oil shales that are recognized as lacustrine deposits (rock that formed in ancient lakes). Based on palynomorph fossils and magnetostratigraphy, the Youganwo Formation is dated to the Middle–Late Eocene, or the Late Eocene. Analysis of fossil leaves from the Youganwo Formation indicate that the area experienced a climate similar to Guangdong today, with subtropical conditions, hot summers, warm winters, and increasingly seasonal rainfall. The region did not experience monsoons during the deposition of the Youganwo Formation, but younger deposits indicate that the climate later shifted to experience monsoon conditions.

Most of the vertebrate fossils found at the Maoming locality in the Youganwo Formation are from aquatic or semiaquatic animals. These include fossils of including cyprinid fish (Eoprocypris maomingensis), several turtles (the adocid Adocus inexpectatus, carettochelyid Anosteira maomingensis, geoemydids Isometremys lacuna and Guandongemys pingi, and pan-trionychid Striatochelys impressa), the tomistomine crocodyloid Maomingosuchus petrolica and the alligatoroid Dongnanosuchus hsui. Mammal fossils are rare in the Youganwo Formation. Most of the mammal fossils are from groups that have been inferred to prefer mesic habitats, including amynodonts (Cadurcodon maomingensis) and anthracotheres (Anthracokeryx naduongensis). Fossils of carnivorous mammals are extremely rare, but include remains of nimravids (Maofelis cantonensis) and hyaenodonts (Maocyon peregrinus).
