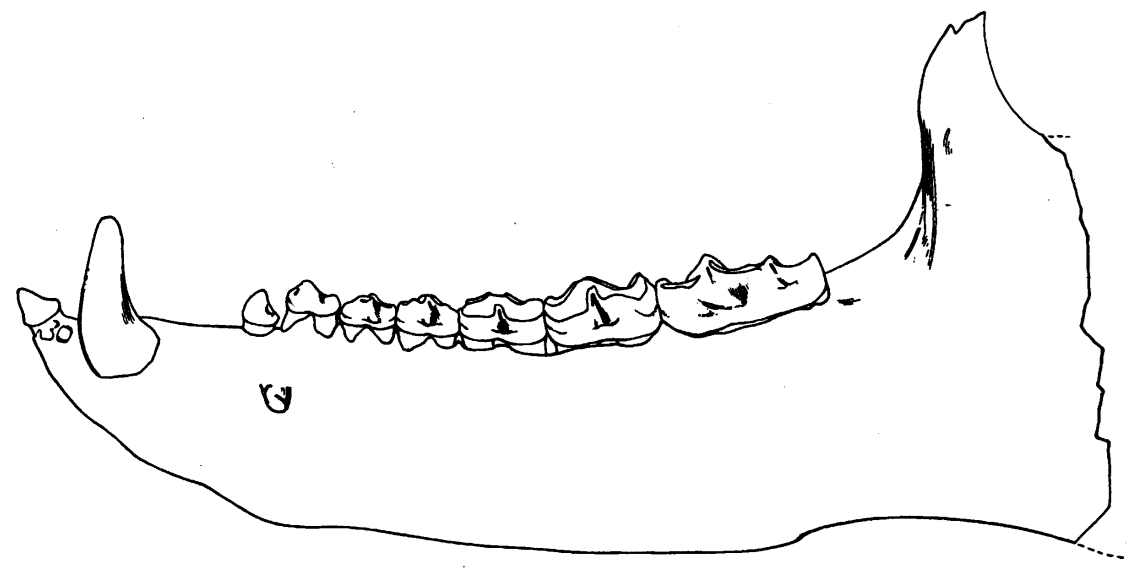
- The lower jaw AMNH 2025, the type specimen of P. altidens. The canine appears larger than it actually is due to taphonomic distortion.

Scientific classification
- Kingdom: Animalia
- Phylum: Chordata
- Class: Mammalia
- Order: Perissodactyla
- Family: †Brontotheriidae
- Subfamily: †Brontotheriinae
- Tribe: †Brontotheriini
- Subtribe: †Brontotheriina
- Infratribe: †Embolotheriita
- Genus: †Pollyosbornia; Mihlbachler, 2008
- Species: †P. altidens

Binomial name
- †Pollyosbornia altidens (Osborn, 1908) [originally Telmatherium]

Synonyms
- Telmatherium? altidens Osborn, 1908

= Pollyosbornia =

Pollyosbornia Temporal range: Middle Eocene (late Uintan), 42.8–40.1 Ma

Extinct genus of mammals

Pollyosbornia is an extinct genus of horned brontothere that lived in North America during the Middle Eocene, in the late Uintan land mammal age. The type and only known species, P. altidens, is known from a poorly-preserved lower jaw found in the Uinta Formation in Utah.

== Research history ==
=== "Telmatherium" altidens ===
In 1908, Henry Fairfield Osborn named the new species Telmatherium? altidens based on the left lower jaw AMNH 2025. AMNH 2025 had been discovered in the Uinta Basin in northeastern Utah by an 1895 expedition from the American Museum of Natural History. The species name altidens was coined in reference to the high-crowned and sharp canine tooth. Stratigraphically, the fossil is from the upper Uinta Formation, the so-called "Uinta C" level.

Osborn provided few details on the fossil in 1908 and noted that referral to Telmatherium was provisional. He published a more detailed description of T. altidens in his 1929 brontothere monograph, The Titanotheres of Ancient Wyoming, Dakota and Nebraska. In 1929, Osborn justified the classification of T. altidens in Telmatherium (which per his taxonomy also included Metatelmatherium ultimum) by several features, including its large canine and large lower incisors, a long diastema (gap between teeth) between the canines and premolars, the size of the molars, and the relative molarization (becoming molar-like) of the second premolar. Osborn considered the long canine to be an especially important trait of the species, describing it as "the most elevated and piercing among all the known titanotheres (Note: "Brontotheres" and "titanotheres" are interchangeable vernacular terms for the Brontotheriidae. Both names derive from genera now considered synonyms of Megacerops (Brontotherium and Titanotherium).)".

=== Creation of a new genus ===
In a 2008 monographic treatment of brontotheres, Matthew C. Mihlbachler refuted all of the traits used by Osborn to place the species in Telmatherium. the large size of the canines is not a feature diagnostic to Telmatherium or Metatelmatherium, and varies within known brontothere species due to individual variation. Furthermore, the canine of AMNH 2025 is not as large as it appears to be in the fossil, since expansion of the matrix (surrounding rock) has distorted its position. The fossil does not preserve any lower incisors, and the alveoli (tooth sockets) are too distorted to determine their size. The other traits appear to distinguish T. altidens from Telmatherium and Metatelmatherium; the second premolar is not more similar to those genera than to any other genus, the diastema between the canines and premolars in T. altidens is longer than in Telmatherium and Metatelmatherium, and the molars of T. altidens are much larger than those of Telmatherium and Metatelmatherium. T. altidens is also larger in size than Telmatherium and Metatelmatherium.

Mihlbachler compared T. altidens to more derived brontotheres, such as Diplacodon and Protitanotherium, but distinguished it from them as well. T. altidens had a large metaconid (one of the cusps of the tooth) on the third premolar. This rules out classification in Protitanotherium, which does not share this feature, but places T. altidens closer to Diplacodon. T. altidens differs from Diplacodon in several features, suc has its larger size, a relatively primitive second premolar, and relatively molariform third and fourth premolars. Mihlbachler interpreted this unique set of traits to distinguish T. altidens as a distinct and valid species. Some features are similar to Gnathotitan but this may also be due to distortion of the fossil, such as the long diastema between the canines and premolars, and a long and deep mandibular symphysis. Mihlbachler chose to place T. altidens in a new genus, which he named Pollyosbornia. Pollyosbornia is named after Osborn; "Polly" was Osborn's nickname as an undergraduate at Princeton University, apparently because he had a "girlish appearance".

== Description ==
Pollyosbornia was a large brontothere, estimated to have reached a body mass of 1,615 kilograms (3,560 lb). It was probably similar to Diplacodon, another Uintan brontothere, except for being larger in size. The cheek tooth series (from the start of the first premolar to the end of the last molar) measures 33 centimeters (13 in).

Pollyosbornia had the (lower jaw) dental formula 3.1.4.3, i.e. three pairs of incisors, one pair of canines, four pairs of premolars, and three pairs of molars.

== Classification ==
Mihlbachler placed Pollyosbornia in the brontothere infratribe Embolotheriita (the "embolotheres"), supported by a comprehensive phylogenetic analysis of brontotheres. Mihlbachler noted that this placement was slightly uncertain; since Pollyosbornia is known only from a lower jaw, many characters could not be scored for it in the analysis, and the actual apomorphies (specific set of features) used to define Embolotheriita are not preserved in AMNH 2025. Pollyosbornia is the only known North American embolothere, which is otherwise a mostly Asian group of brontotheres. Only one other embolothere is known from outside Asia, the eastern European Brachydiastematherium, but eastern Europe and Asia were biogeographically linked in the Eocene.

The cladogram below shows a strict reduced consensus of the Brontotheriina subtribe of brontotheres, from a phylogenetic analysis performed by Mihlbachler and Thomas Deméré as part of the description of the brontothere Parvicornus in 2009:

- - Brontotheriina
    - Protitan grangeri
    - Protitan minor
    - - Protitanotherium emarginatum
      - Rhinotitan kaiseni
      - Rhinotitan andrewsi
      - - Pachytitan ajax
        - Diplacodon elatus
        - Brontotheriita
          - Parabrontops gobiensis
          - - Eubrontotherium clarnoensis
            - Protitanops curryi
            - Parvicornus occidentalis
            - - Notiotitanops mississippiensis
              - Dianotitan lunanensis
              - Duchesneodus uintensis
              - Megacerops coloradensis
              - Megacerops kuwagatarhinus
      - Embolotheriita
        - Pygmaetitan panxianensis
        - - Aktautitan hippopotamopus
          - - Pollyosbornia altidens
            - Gnathotitan berkeyi
        - - Brachydiastematherium transylvanicum
          - Metatitan khaitshinus
          - - Metatitan primus
            - Metatitan relictus
        - - Nasamplus progressus
          - - Protembolotherium efremovi
            - - Embolotherium andrewsi
              - Embolotherium grangeri
