= Youganwo Formation =

Geologic formation in Guangdong, China

- Stratigraphic range: Middle–Late Eocene
- Type: Formation
- Unit of: Maoming Basin
- Underlies: Huangniuling Formation

Location
- Region: Guangdong
- Country: China

The Youganwo Formation is a geologic formation in Guangdong, southern China. The Youganwo Formation preserves fossils dating back to the Middle or Late Eocene epoch of the Paleogene period.

== Geology and depositional environment ==
The Youganwo Formation is part of the Maoming Basin, a structural basin in Guangdong, China that preserves sediments that range in age from the Late Cretaceous to the Neogene period. The upper part of the Youganwo Formation, which consists of dark brown oil shales, is the only stratigraphic unit in the Maoming Basin where vertebrate fossils have been found. The dark brown oil shales that make up the formation were deposited in lacustrine conditions. Analysis of fossil leaves found in the formation indicate that the climate was similar to the modern-day climate in Guangdong, with humid and subtropical conditions, hot summers, warm winters, and increasingly seasonal rainfall.

The Youganwo Formation has been dated to the middle-late or Late Eocene. The stratigraphy of the formation and the fossil plants found indicates a Middle Eocene age, whereas fossil pollen suggests Late Eocene. This may be due to fossil samples used; it is possible that the upper parts of the formation are Late Eocene and that the lower parts are Middle Eocene.

== Vertebrate fossils ==
=== Mammals ===
==== Artiodactyls ====
Genus/family	Species	Locality	Notes/affinities	Images
Anthracokeryx	A. naduongensis	Maoming	An anthracothere. Fragmentary fossils were previously referred to the perissodactyl Lunania cf. youngi.	

==== Carnivorans ====
Genus/family	Species	Locality	Notes/affinities	Images
Maofelis	M. cantonensis	Maoming	A nimravid ("false saber-toothed cat").	

==== Hyaenodonts ====
Genus/family	Species	Locality	Notes/affinities	Images
Maocyon	M. peregrinus	Maoming	A hyainailourid.	

==== Perissodactyls ====
Genus/family	Species	Locality	Notes/affinities	Images
Cadurcodon	C. maomingensis	Maoming	An amynodont.	
Maobrontops	M. paganus	Maoming	A horned brontothere.	

=== Ray-finned fishes ===
Genus/family	Species	Locality	Notes/affinities	Images
Eoprocypris	E. maomingensis	Maoming	A cyprinid fish. Previously treated under the name Cyprinus maomingensis.	

=== Reptiles ===
==== Crocodilians ====
Genus/family	Species	Locality	Notes/affinities	Images
Dongnanosuchus	D. hsui	Maoming	A orientalosuchin alligatoroid. Previously treated under the name "Alligatoridae indet."	
Maomingosuchus	M. petrolica	Maoming	A gavialoid. Previously treated under the name Tomistoma petrolica.	

==== Turtles ====
Genus/family	Species	Locality	Notes/affinities	Images
Adocus	A. inexpectatus	Maoming	An adocid turtle.	
Anosteira	A. maomingensis	Maoming	A carettochelyid turtle.	
Guandongemys	G. pingi	Maoming	A geoemydid turtle.	
Isometremys	I. lacuna	Maoming	A geoemydid turtle.	
Striatochelys	S. impressa	Maoming	A pan-trionychid softshell turtle. Previously treated uunder the name Trionyx impressus.	
