= Pygmaetitan =

Pygmaetitan Temporal range: Late Eocene
- Drawing of IVPP V.6526-1, a fragmentary juvenile maxilla of P. panxianensis, preserving some of the deciduous dentition

Scientific classification
- Kingdom: Animalia
- Phylum: Chordata
- Class: Mammalia
- Order: Perissodactyla
- Family: †Brontotheriidae
- Subfamily: †Brontotheriinae
- Tribe: †Brontotheriini
- Subtribe: †Brontotheriina
- Infratribe: †Embolotheriita
- Genus: †Pygmaetitan; Miao, 1982
- Species: †P. panxianensis

Binomial name
- †Pygmaetitan panxianensis Miao, 1982

Extinct genus of mammals

Pygmaetitan (lit. 'pygmy titan') is an extinct genus of horned brontothere that lived in East Asia during the Late Eocene. The genus contains a single species, P. panxianensis, known from fossil jaw material and teeth found in the Shinao Formation in Guizhou, southwestern China.

The molars of Pygmaetitan place it as a highly derived brontothere, related to genera such as Embolotherium and Metatitan. The incisors and canines were unusually large, similar to the significantly more primitive genus Sthenodectes. Pygmaetitan was also very small, from which the genus gets its name, and is estimated to have reached a mass of just 126.6 kilograms (279 lb). This is unusually small for a derived brontothere, and puts Pygmaetitan in the same size range as basal brontotheres such as Eotitanops and the smallest specimens of Palaeosyops.

== Research history ==
Pygmaetitan panxianensis was described by Desui Miao in 1982. The new genus and species were based on fossils found in the Shinao Formation, in Panzhou, Guizhou, China. The Shinao Formation was formerly dated to the Early Oligocene, but modern reassessments have dated it to the Late Eocene. The type specimen of P. panxianensis is IVPP V.6521, a fragmentary maxilla with a nearly complete set of the upper dentition of an adult individual (preserving the third incisor to the third molar). Several additional fragments of maxillae and isolated teeth from the Shinao Formation were referred to P. panxianensis by Miao, including maxillae of juvenile individuals, with deciduous dentition preserved. Miao noted that the dentition of Pygmaetitan easily differentiated it from small brontotheres known from North America, and that its cheek teeth were similar to those of derived brontotheres from the Late Eocene, but that its enlarged canines and incisors were relatively unique.

In a 2008 monograph on brontotheres, Matthew C. Mihlbachler made additional comparisons to other brontothere genera, and noted that several dental features, including the large incisors, were similar to Sthenodectes, whereas the molars closely resembled those of the subtantially larger Embolotherium, significantly more derived than Sthenodectes.

== Description ==
Pygmaetitan was a small brontothere. It was subtantially larger than Nanotitanops, with more than double its cheek teeth dimensions, but Pygmaetitan was very small for a derived brontothere, just slightly exceeding the largest specimens of Eotitanops in size, and being similar in size to the smallest specimens of Palaeosyops. Several other relatively small brontotheres substantially exceeded Pygmaetitan in size, such as Microtitan, Mesatirhinus, and Fossendorhinus. In 2023, Oscar Sanisidro, Mihlbachler, and Juan L. Cantalapiedra estimated P. panxianensis to have weighed 126.6 kilograms (279 lb).

=== Dentition ===
The known fossils of Pygmaetitan are too poorly preserved to describe any feature of the skull other than the dentition. Pygmaetitan had the dental formula 3.1.4.33.1.4.3. The only upper incisor preserved in the type specimen, presumably from the third pair, is very large, as are the known lower incisors. Pygmaetitan is one of only two known brontothere genera to have greatly enlarged incisors, the other being Sthenodectes. The upper incisors were subcaniniform (canine-shaped, i.e. relatively thick, rounded, and pointed). The upper canines were also very large. The upper canines were separated from the premolars by a very short diastema (gap between teeth) of just a few millimeters; this shortened diastema is another feature shared with Sthenodectes. The first and second pairs of upper premolars had distinct metacones (one of the cusps). The second to fourth pair of upper premolars increased in size successively, and all lacked distinct hypocones (another cusp). The upper molars of Pygmaetitan exhibited a suite of derived characteristics, including tall, lingually angled (angled toward the tongue) ectolophs with thinned lingual enamel, a feature that also distinguishes Pygmaetitan from Sthenodectes.

The first and second pairs of lower incisors were semispatulate, with rounded apices, whereas the third pair were sharper and more subcaniniform. The lower incisors were all about the same, enlargened size. The more posterior adult lower dentition is more poorly known. The lower molars had relatively thin enamel, and deep, valley-like basins. The third pair of lower molars were elongated.

== Classification ==
Although Pygmaetitan was in a size range similar to that of primitive brontotheres such as Eotitanops and Palaeosyops, the derived state of its molars clearly places the genus in the derived subtribe Brontotheriina (the horned brontotheres). In a phylogenetic analysis, Mihlbachler (2008) recovered Pygmaetitan in the infratribe Embolotheriita (within Brontotheriina), in a polytomy with two derived clades including Embolotherium and its closest relatives, and Metatitan and its closest relatives. Subsequent analyses have generally continued to recover Pygmaetitan in the same position. Averianov et al. (2018) recovered Pygmaetitan as closer to Embolotherium than to Metatitan.

Topology A: Mihlbachler (2008)

- Embolotheriita
  - - Aktautitan hippopotamopus
    - - Pollyosbornia altidens
      - Gnathotitan berkeyi
  - - Pygmaetitan panxianensis
    - - Brachydiastematherium transylvanicum
      - Metatitan khaitshinus
      - - Metatitan primus
        - Metatitan relictus
    - - Nasamplus progressus
      - - Protembolotherium efremovi
        - - Embolotherium andrewsi
          - Embolotherium grangeri

Topology B: Averianov et al. (2018)

- Embolotheriita
  - - Aktautitan hippopotamopus
    - - Pollyosbornia altidens
      - Gnathotitan berkeyi
  - - - Brachydiastematherium transylvanicum
      - Metatitan khaitshinus
      - - Metatitan primus
        - Metatitan relictus
    - - Pygmaetitan panxianensis
      - - Maobrontops paganus
        - - Nasamplus progressus
          - - Protembolotherium efremovi
            - - Embolotherium andrewsi
              - Embolotherium grangeri

== Paleoecology ==
The warm and humid climate of southeastern Asia has changed relatively little since the Eocene, in contrast to Northern and Central Asia, which has experienced gradual drying and aridification. The Shinao Formation experienced a tropical monsoon climate. The Shinao Formation preserves a relatively diverse and unique fauna of large mammals. Other large mammals known from the formation include both palaeotheres (Qianohippus) and several primitive ruminants (Chiyoumeryx, Krabimeryx, and Iberomeryx).
