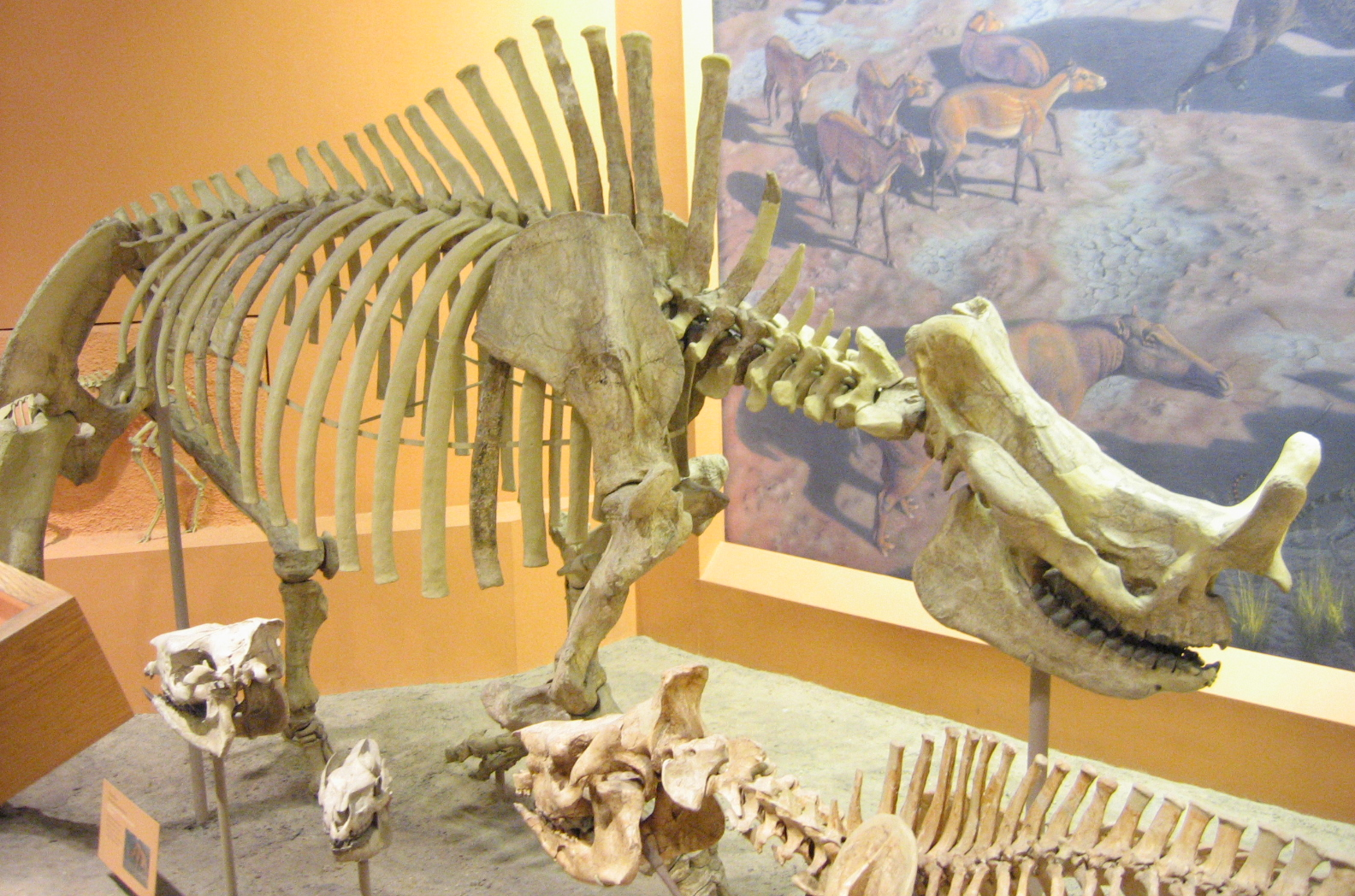
- Skeleton of Megacerops, National Museum of Natural History
- Skull of Embolotherium, Tianjin Natural History Museum

Scientific classification
- Kingdom: Animalia
- Phylum: Chordata
- Class: Mammalia
- Order: Perissodactyla
- Family: †Brontotheriidae
- Subfamily: †Brontotheriinae
- Tribe: †Brontotheriini
- Subtribe: †Brontotheriina; Marsh, 1873

Genera and subgroups
- †Arctotitan?; †Diplacodon; †Pachytitan; †Protitan; †Protitanotherium; †Rhinotitan; †Sivatitanops?; †Brontotheriita Marsh, 1873; †Dianotitan; †Duchesneodus; †Eubrontotherium; †Megacerops; †Notiotitanops; †Oreinotherium?; †Parabrontops; †Parvicornus; †Protitanops; †Embolotheriita Osborn, 1929; †Aktautitan; †Brachydiastematherium; †Embolotherium; †Gnathotitan; †Maobrontops; †Metatitan; †Nasamplus; †Pollyosbornia; †Protembolotherium; †Pygmaetitan; †Titanodectes

= Brontotheriina =

Horned brontotheres Temporal range: Middle–Late Eocene, 47.8–33.7 Ma (Note: The fossil range follows North American land mammal age correlations (with precise dates) from Hodnett et al. (2022) and Asian land mammal age correlations from Bai et al. (2020).)

Extinct subtribe of mammals

Horned brontotheres (subtribe Brontotheriina) were a group, or clade, of derived (advanced) brontotheres characterized by large body sizes and horns. Horned brontotheres are known from the Middle to Late Eocene, and achieved a nearly holarctic distribution, ranging across North America, Asia, and eastern Europe. They were a diverse and dominant group of large herbivores, and were among the largest land mammals of the Eocene.

Horned brontotheres have no true modern-day analogues but were superficially similar to rhinoceroses, an example of convergent evolution; they differ in several major and minor features, for example in that brontothere horns were composed of bone, not keratin. The life appearance and function of the horns is uncertain, but common hypotheses include them being used for display and in intraspecific combat. Horns came in a variety of shapes and sizes, from small bony protuberances to elaborate structures with shapes reminiscent of slingshots and battering rams.

Horned brontotheres have only recently been recognized as a monophyletic group; Asian and North American brontotheres were previously believed to have evolved horns and large sizes independently. It has proven difficult to reconstruct the paleobiogeography of the horned brontotheres, but they are believed to have originated in Asia and to have undergone evolutionary radiation in both Asia and North America, alongside several migration events between the two continents. Advanced horned brontotheres are divided into two subgroups, the predominantly Asian Embolotheriita (or "embolotheres") and the predominantly North American Brontotheriita (or "eubrontotheres"). Both embolotheres and eubrontotheres reached very large body sizes in the Late Eocene, exemplified by the Asian Embolotherium and the North American Megacerops.

== Description ==
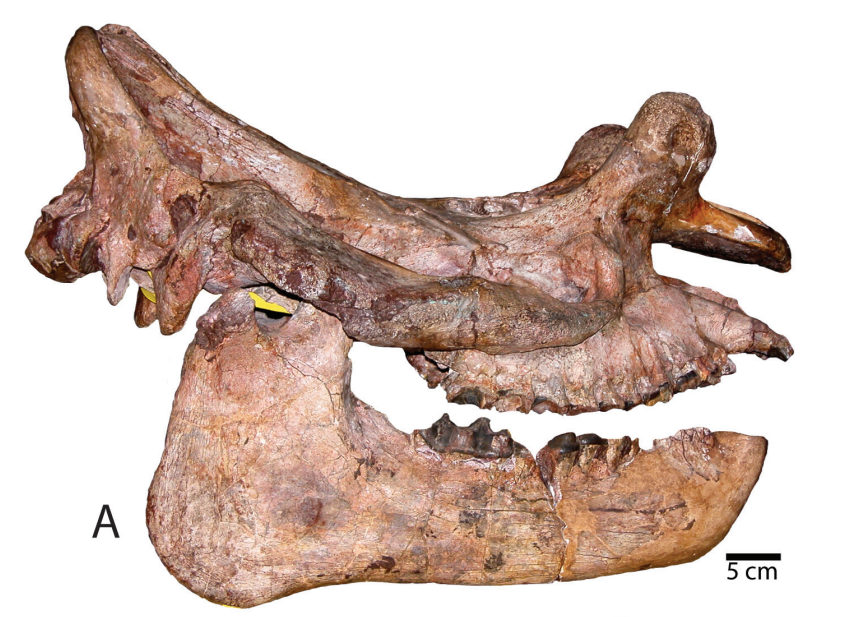
Skull of Protitanops

The defining characteristic of the horned brontotheres is the presence of bony protuberances (horns) on their nasal or frontal bones, a trait that distinguishes them from all other brontotheres. Other apomorphies (defining shared traits) of the horned brontotheres include their distinctly saddle-shaped skulls, and their relatively straight zygomatic arches. (Note: Phylogenetic analyses sometimes recover the genera Epimanteoceras and Qufutitan, or some of their assigned fossils, within Brontotheriina, though their position is variable. Should Epimanteoceras or Qufutitan be confidently found to be within the clade, "Brontotheriina" may require redefinition since Epimanteoceras and Qufutitan do not share all of the apomorphies per the current definition.) Most horned brontotheres are also characterized by massive bodies and robust limbs. Like all brontotheres, they are also characterized by a relatively short face, and the skull being elongated behind the eyes.

All brontotheres had a distinctive dentition, characterized by molars with W-shaped ectolophs (outer shearing blades). Their teeth appear to have been adapted to both cutting and shearing, and have traditionally been interpreted as indicating a selective frugivorous (fruit-eating) and/or folivorous (leaf-eating) diet. The large size of many horned brontotheres means that they must have been relatively non-selective feeders. Their diet may have been similar to that of modern moose and black rhinoceroses.

Brontotheres have no true modern-day analogues. Horned brontotheres were superficially similar to modern rhinoceroses; this is an example of convergent evolution since they may not be closely related (Note: Both brontotheres and rhinoceroses belong to the mammal order Perissodactyla. The exact position of brontotheres among the perissodactyls is unclear and varies between studies. Their traditional placement is in the suborder Hippomorpha, as relatives of modern horses, but other classifications have also been proposed, such as brontotheres being a basal (primitive) sister group to all other perissodactyls or belonging to the suborder Ceratomorpha (the group that includes rhinoceroses and tapirs).) and horned brontotheres evolved from much smaller, hornless ancestors such as Eotitanops. Several major and minor features distinguish the horned brontotheres from rhinoceroses. Among the more obvious differences are that brontothere horns were composed of bone (not keratin, as in rhinoceroses), subtle differences in limb proportions, and that brontotheres had four toes on their manus (front feet) whereas rhinoceroses have three.

== Classification ==
=== History ===
Fossils of horned brontotheres were the first brontothere fossils to be discovered, and were among the first vertebrate fossils known from the western United States. The first fossils, found in the White River Formation, are now recognizable as Megacerops and were described in detail in the mid-to-late 19th century by American paleontologists such as Joseph Leidy, Othniel Charles Marsh, an Edward Drinker Cope. The first remains of horned brontotheres in Europe, belonging to the genus Brachydiastematherium, were reported by the Hungarian paleontologists János Böckh and János Matyasovsky in 1876. In Asia, brontotheres were first reported in the early 20th century. Expeditions from the American Museum of Natural History in the 1920s and 1930s to East Asia recovered a large number of fossils, and the diversity of Asian horned brontotheres quickly rivaled that known from North America.

Brontothere classification and systematics have varied considerably over time. In 1929, Henry Fairfield Osborn divided horned brontotheres into a number of different subfamilies. Osborn believed that the Asian embolotheres represented a highly distinct lineage, and erected the subfamily Embolotheriinae to contain them. In a 1943 revision of Mongolian brontotheres, Walter W. Granger and William King Gregory followed Osborn in suggesting that the embolotheres formed a separate lineage from North American horned brontotheres, sharing a last common ancestor as far back as Palaeosyops. Granger and Gregory's work remained the definitive work on Asian brontotheres for much of the 20th century.

Understanding of brontotheres as a group was long hampered by the lack of reevaluations of the Asian fossil material. Asian brontotheres continued to be named over the course of the 20th century, and the taxonomy was partially revised by Russian and Chinese paleontologists. Much of this work built on Granger and Gregory's 1943 revision, without new comparisons to the large collection of Asian fossils in American museums. The collection of Asian brontothere fossils at the American Museum of Natural History is the largest collection of Asian brontothere fossils in the world and contains the majority of the holotype specimens. In the early 21st century, this collection began to be reexamined and reevaluated by the American paleontologist Matthew Mihlbachler. Mihlbachler's studies of the material, supported by phylogenetic analyses, led to large-scale taxonomic revisions and the recognition of horned brontotheres as a monophyletic group.

=== Systematics and phylogenetics ===
==== Internal ====
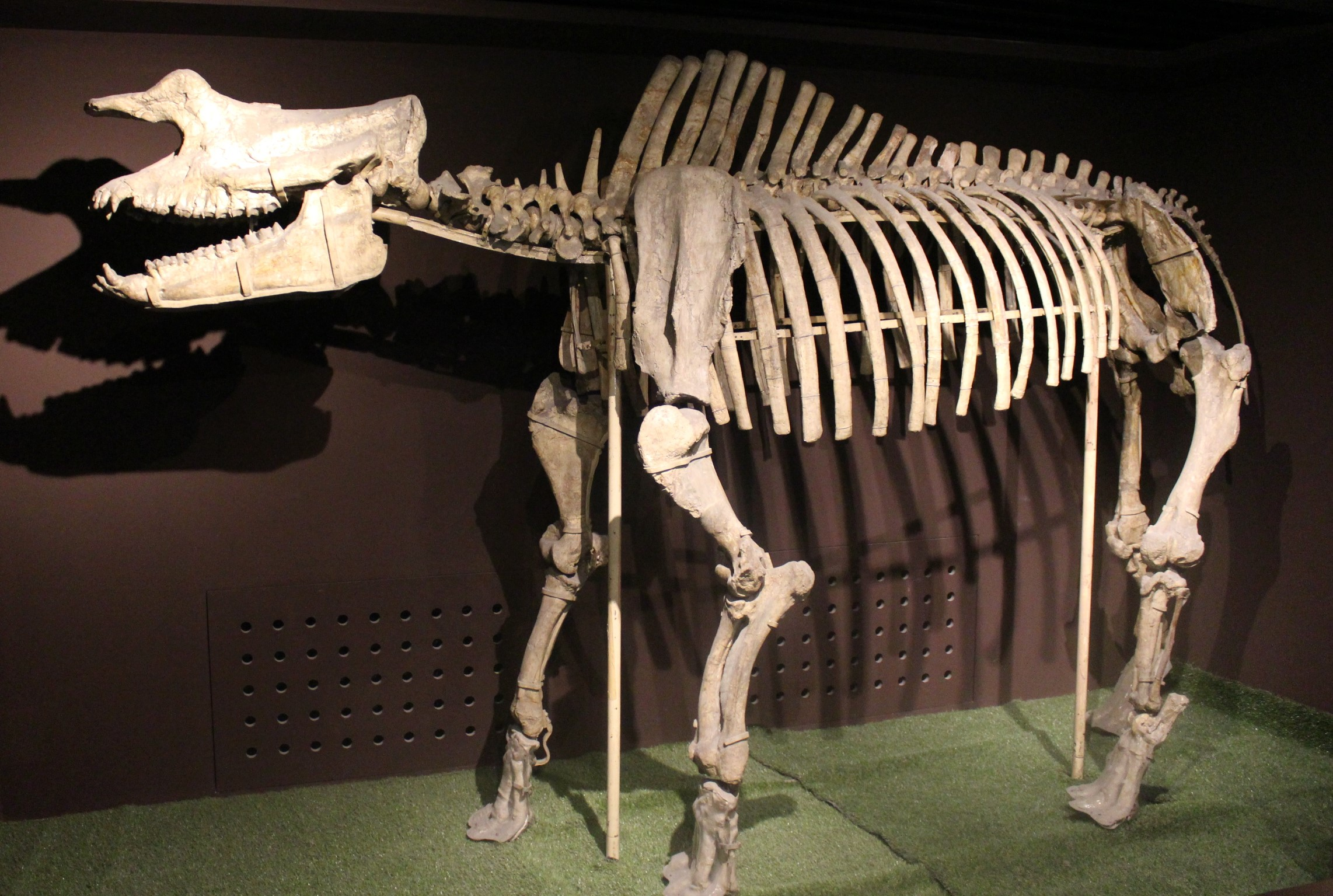
Skeleton of Rhinotitan, Paleozoological Museum of China

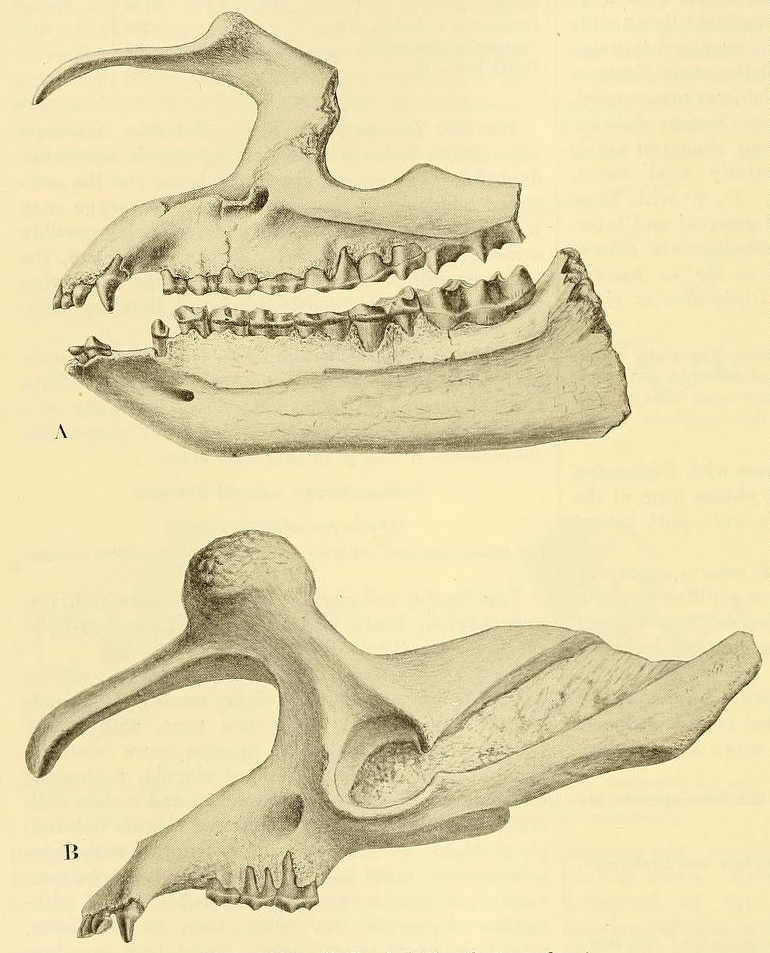
Skulls of Diplacodon

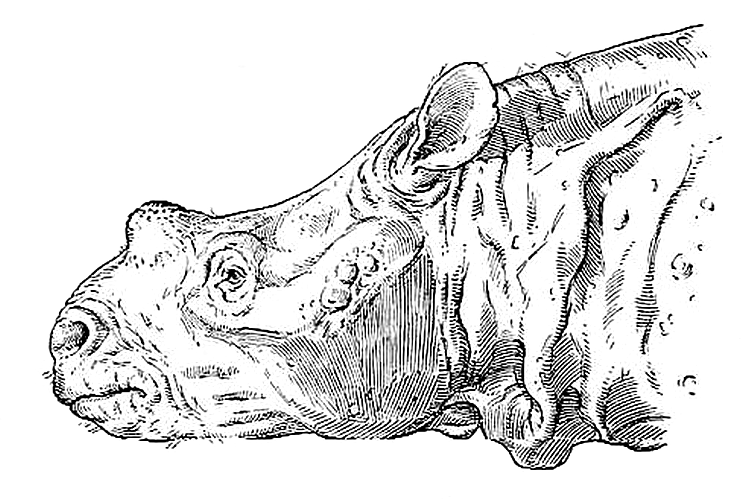
Life restoration of Protitanotherium

Horned brontotheres are classified as the subtribe Brontotheriina. There are two clearly defined clades within the subtribe, the infratribes Brontotheriita and Embolotheriita, as well as several basal (primitive) genera. The taxonomic authorities (scientists who first validly published the names) for Brontotheriina and Brontotheriita is formally Othniel Charles Marsh, 1873, due to having named the family Brontotheriidae. Osborn, 1929, is the authority for Embolotheriita, due to having named the now deprecated subfamily Embolotheriinae.

The cladograms below show the primary strict reduced consensus tree from Mihlbachler's 2008 analysis, and the reduced strict consensus tree from a 2021 analysis by Mihlbachler and Donald Prothero:

Topology A: Mihlbachler (2008)

- Brontotheriina
  - Protitan grangeri
  - Protitan minor
  - - Protitanotherium emarginatum
    - - - Rhinotitan kaiseni
        - Rhinotitan andrewsi
      - - Pachytitan ajax
        - Diplacodon elatus
        - Brontotheriita
          - Parabrontops gobiensis
          - Protitanops curryi
          - - Eubrontotherium clarnoensis
            - - Dianotitan lunanensis
              - Duchesneodus uintensis
              - - Megacerops coloradensis
                - Megacerops kuwagatarhinus
      - Embolotheriita
        - - Aktautitan hippopotamopus
          - - Pollyosbornia altidens
            - Gnathotitan berkeyi
        - - Pygmaetitan panxianensis
          - - Brachydiastematherium transylvanicum
            - Metatitan khaitshinus
            - - Metatitan primus
              - Metatitan relictus
          - - Nasamplus progressus
            - - Protembolotherium efremovi
              - - Embolotherium andrewsi
                - Embolotherium grangeri

Topology B: Mihlbachler & Prothero (2021)

- Brontotheriina
  - Epimanteoceras mae
  - - Protitan grangeri
    - Protitan minor
  - - Rhinotitan kaiseni
    - - Rhinotitan andrewsi
      - Brontotheriita
        - Parabrontops gobiensis
        - Eubrontotherium clarnoensis
        - Parvicornus occidentalis
        - - Protitanops curryi
          - - Dianotitan lunanensis
            - - Duchesneodus uintensis
              - - Megacerops coloradensis
                - Megacerops kuwagatarhinus
      - Protitanotherium emarginatum
      - Pachytitan ajax
      - - Diplacodon elatus
        - Diplacodon gigan
      - Embolotheriita
        - - Aktautitan hippopotamopus
          - - Pollyosbornia altidens
            - Gnathotitan berkeyi
        - - Pygmaetitan panxianensis
          - - Brachydiastematherium transylvanicum
            - Metatitan khaitshinus
            - - Metatitan primus
              - Metatitan relictus
          - - Nasamplus progressus
            - - Protembolotherium efremovi
              - - Embolotherium andrewsi
                - Embolotherium grangeri

Both Brontotheriita and Embolotheriita are defined by their own sets of apomorphies. Embolotheriita are characterized by an elevated nasal process with thin and deep lateral (side) walls, as well as narrowly spaced or fused horns. Brontotheriita are characterized by an unelevated nasal process and several features of the teeth, including straight rows of small lower and upper incisors, upper incisors that were globular in shape, and weak labial premolar ribs (ridges on the premolars, facing the cheek).

==== External ====
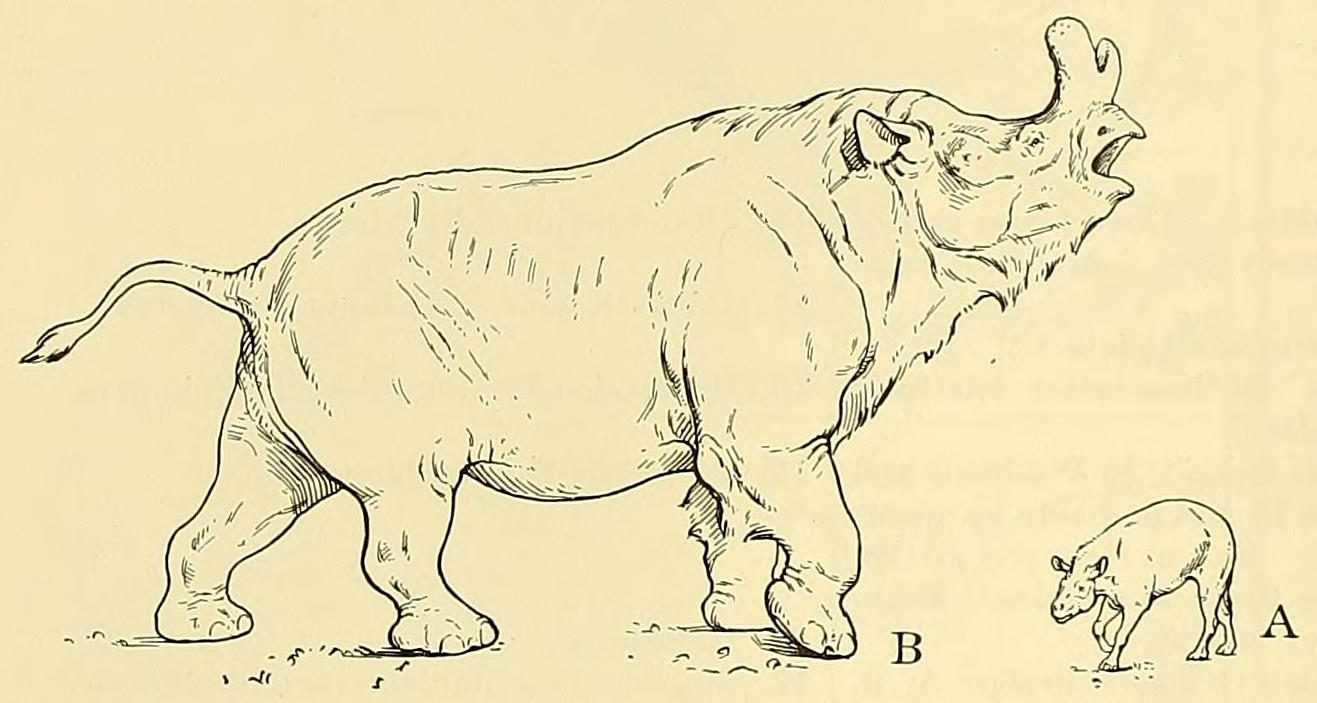
The horned brontothere Megacerops (B) and the basal brontothere Eotitanops (A), drawn to scale

Brontotheriina is classified within the tribe Brontotheriini, which also contains several brontothere groups and genera where the configuration of the frontal and nasal bones appear to foreshadow the evolution of horns in Brontotheriina, such as the closely related subtribe Telmatheriina (containing brontotheres such as Telmatherium (Note: Telmatherium specifically has historically been interpreted as a primitive ancestor of the horned brontotheres because its frontal bones form short triangular extensions above and behind the eye sockets. Historical reconstructions erroneously exaggerated these extensions, sometimes restoring them as horns, but there is no evidence of actual horn-like structures in Telmatherium and similar extensions are known in other genera. Although phylogenetic analyses recover Telmatherium as closely related to the horned brontotheres, it is not necessarily closer than other brontotheres in the Brontotheriini.) and Metatelmatherium).

The cladograms below are again adapted from Mihlbachler's 2008 analysis, and Mihlbachler and Prothero's 2021 analysis:

Topology A: Mihlbachler (2008)

- Brontotheriidae
  - - Eotitanops
    - - cf. Eotitanops
      - - Palaeosyops
        - Brontotheriinae
          - Bunobrontops savagei
          - - Mesatirhinus junius
            - - Dolichorhinus hyognathus
              - - Desmatotitan tukhumensis
                - Acrotitan ulanshirehensis
              - - Sphenocoelus uintensis
                - Brontotheriini
                  - - Microtitan mongoliensis
                    - Rhadinorhinina
                      - Fossendorhinus diploconus
                      - - Metarhinus fluviatilis
                        - Metarhinus abbotti
                  - - Sthenodectes incisivum
                    - - Telmatheriina
                        - Telmatherium validus
                        - - Qufutitan zhoui
                          - - Wickia brevirhinus
                            - Metatelmatherium ultimum
                      - - Epimanteoceras formosus
                        - Brontotheriina

Topology B: Mihlbachler & Prothero (2021)

- Brontotheriidae
  - - Eotitanops
    - "cf. Eotitanops" (Eberle, 2006)
    - Eotitanops pakistanensis
    - - Palaeosyops
      - Brontotheriinae
        - Bunobrontops savagei
        - - Balochititanops haqi
          - - Mesatirhinus junius
            - - Dolichorhinus hyognathus
              - - Desmatotitan tukhumensis
                - Acrotitan ulanshirehensis
              - - Sphenocoelus uintensis
                - Brontotheriini
                  - - Microtitan mongoliensis
                    - Rhadinorhinina
                      - Fossendorhinus diploconus
                      - - Metarhinus pater
                        - Metarhinus fluviatilis
                        - Metarhinus abbotti
                  - - Sthenodectes incisivum
                    - - Telmatherium validus
                      - Qufutitan zhoui
                      - - Wickia brevirhinus
                        - Xylotitan cenosus
                        - Metatelmatherium ultimum
                      - - Epimanteoceras formosus
                        - Brontotheriina

=== Etymology ===
The names Brontotheriina and Brontotheriita, and "brontothere" itself, are derived from the genus Brontotherium (now considered a synonym of Megacerops). Brontotherium means "thunder beast", from the Greek βροντή (brontḗ, "thunder") and θηρίον (theríon, "beast"). The name Brontotherium was coined by Marsh in 1873 in honor of Lakota legends of wakíŋyaŋ ("thunder beasts"). The name Embolotheriita is derived from the genus Embolotherium. Embolotherium, coined by Osborn, means "battering ram beast", from the Greek έμβολή (emvolí, glossed as "battering ram" by Osborn) and θηρίον (theríon, "beast"), in reference to the unique fused horns of the genus.

Some basal horned brontotheres, such as Diplacodon and Protitanotherium, are sometimes informally grouped together as "diplacodonts", but this is not a formal taxon. Members of the Embolotheriita are informally referred to as "embolotheres". Prior to the formal recognition of infratribes, the clade corresponding to Brontotheriita was sometimes referred to as "eubrontotheres" (meaning "true brontotheres"), a term that has seen limited continued use as an informal term.

== Paleobiology ==
=== Body size ===
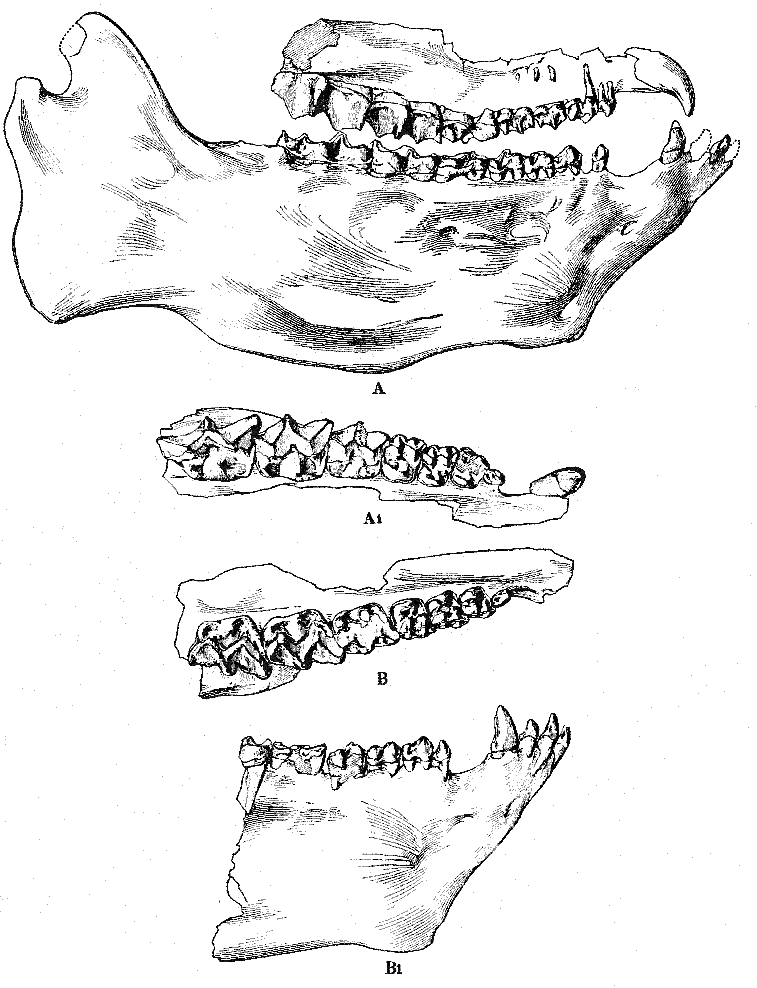
Fossil jaws of Gnathotitan

Over the course of their relatively rapid evolution, the brontotheres experienced one of the most extreme size increases in all of mammalian evolutionary history. Stephen L. Brusatte has described the horned brontotheres as "the first mammals that truly tried to imitate the colossal dinosaurs of ages past".

Horned brontotheres were among the largest land mammals of the Eocene. Before to the brontotheres, the largest land mammals had been the dinoceratans, a group that went extinct in the Middle Eocene. The largest dinoceratan was Eobasileus, about 1.8 m (5.9 ft) at the shoulder. The largest of the horned brontotheres (such as Megacerops) were larger, at 2.5 meters (8 ft 2 in) tall at the shoulder or more. Horned brontotheres were far larger than other contemporary perissodactyls. With the exception of the largest amynodonts, perissodactyls were otherwise mostly small in the Eocene. After their extinction, horned brontotheres were surpassed in size in the Oligocene by the gigantic paraceratheres (such as Paraceratherium). Recent size estimates of the paracerathere Urtinotherium suggest that paraceratheres may have equalled or surpassed the largest brontotheres in size already in the latest Eocene. The largest brontotheres were larger than all perissodactyls living today, including rhinoceroses.

The largest well-known horned brontotheres (and largest brontotheres overall) are the eubrontothere Megacerops and the embolothere Embolotherium. Several other genera may have rivaled them in size, such as Arctotitan, Gnathotitan, Nasamplus, and Titanodectes, but they are known from relatively poor fossil material. The jaws of Gnathotitan are the largest and deepest brontothere jaws known, but next to nothing is known of the rest of its body.

=== Horns ===
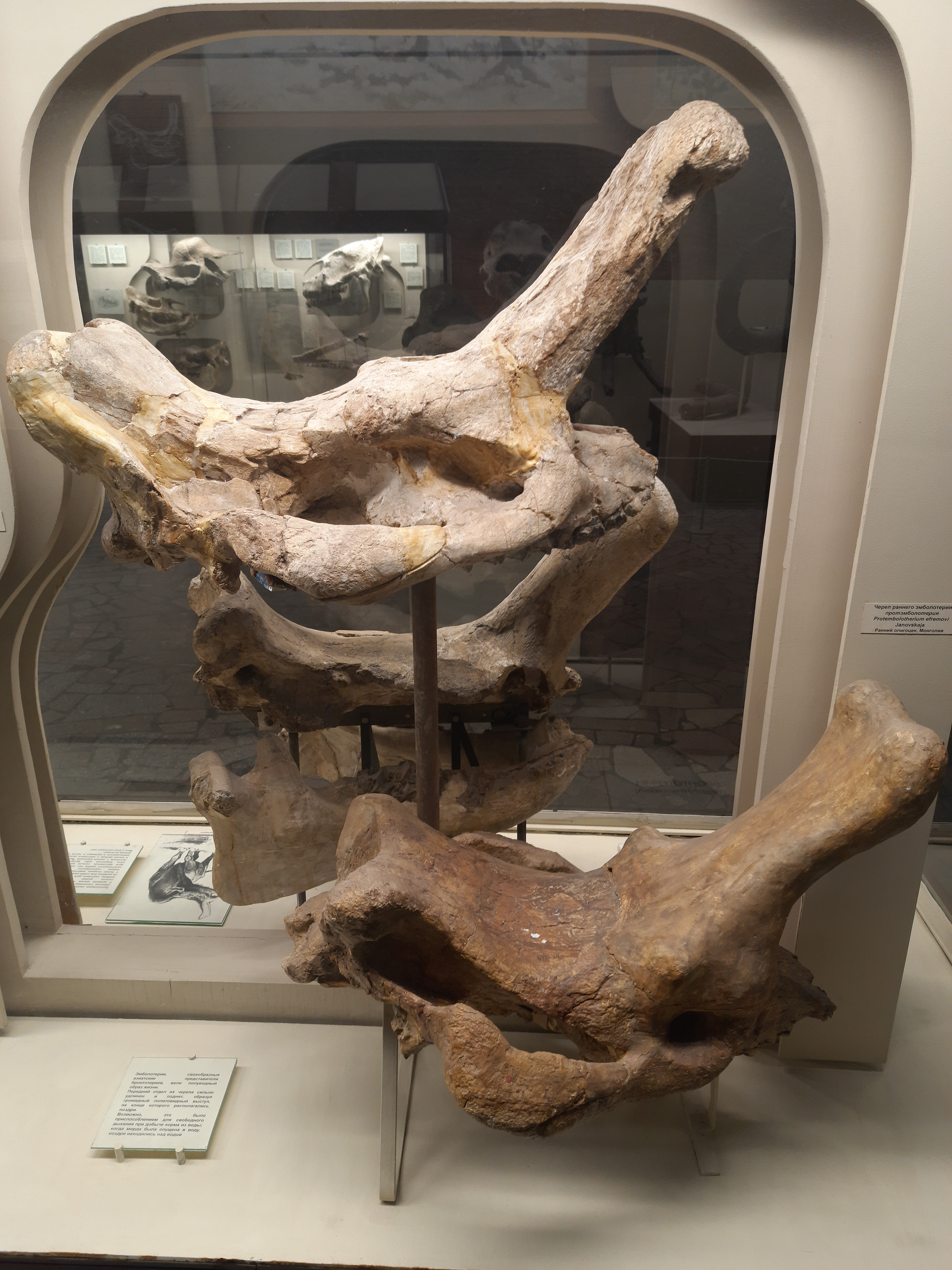
Protembolotherium skulls, Moscow Paleontological Museum

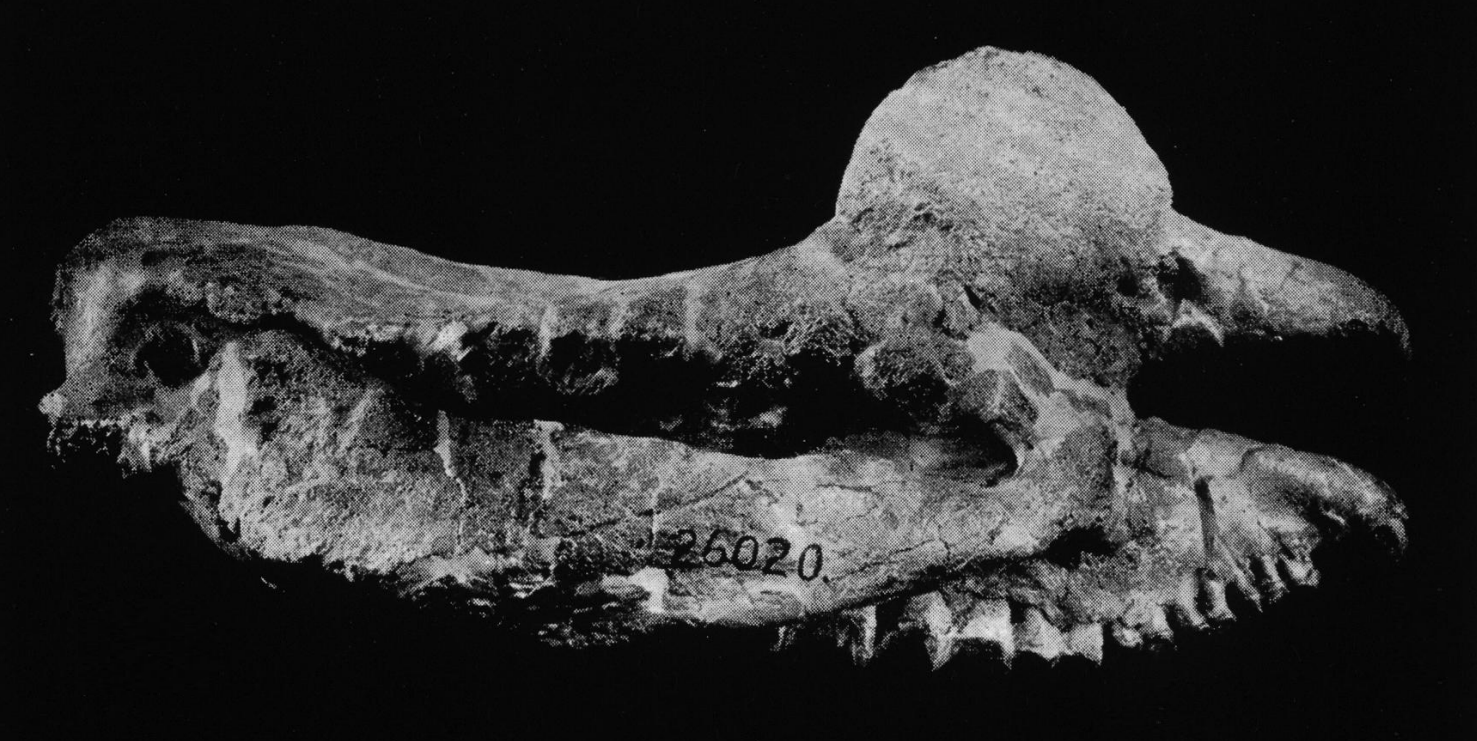
Skull of Parabrontops

Horn morphology was quite variable in brontotheres. There is no direct evidence for the life appearance or function of the horns. Common hypotheses are that the horns were used for intraspecific combat, display purposes, and for species identification. Among modern mammals, the anatomical structure that most closely resembles brontothere horns are the ossicones of giraffes. Like ossicones, brontothere horns were most likely entirely covered in skin; this skin has been speculated to have been keratinized, though no evidence exists for this. Brontothere horns do not preserve any grooves for nutrient blood vessels, unlike rhinoceros horns, and sometimes show evidence of the growth of new bone, perhaps due to damage from intraspecific clashes. The supporting base of brontothere horns was thin and spongy, which means that they would not have been able to use their horns for violent headbutting, like modern bighorn sheep; instead, horns were likely used for head-to-head swining and pushing, and wrestling, similar to antelope horns.

In many horned brontotheres, such as Protitan and Protitanotherium the horns were relatively small bony protuberances. In Rhinotitan, the horns are small, but placed high above the eye sockets up on the nasal process, and project nearly horizontally out towards the side. Generally speaking, more derived horned brontotheres, such as Diplacodon and Duchesneodus, had larger and more robust horns. In the most derived North American forms, such as Protitanops and Megacerops, the horns developed into large, bulbous structures. The distinctive horns of Megacerops are vaguely reminiscent of a slingshot in shape. The size of horns was individually variable in brontotheres, and had effects on the overall skull anatomy; in Megacerops with larger horns, the entire nasal process is largely absorbed by the horns and reduced to just a small remnant structure.

In one lineage of embolotheres, the horns fused into a single structure, taking the form of an elevated crest in Nasamplus, and a much larger battering ram-like structure in Protembolotherium and Embolotherium. The ram of Embolotherium is considered the most ornate and highly derived protuberance of all brontotheres; although traditionally interpreted as a still horn-like feature, recent reinterpretations favor the ram of Embolotherium as entirely incorporated into the soft tissue of the head, supporting a large nasal cavity.

Some horned brontotheres had additional structures on their skulls. In addition to a ram like that of Embolotherium, Protembolotherium also had a set of two smaller horns further back on the skull, above the eye sockets. Duchesneodus had two small to medium-sized horns in front of its eye sockets but also a prominent dome on the upper surface of the skull, which in some specimens are so large that they recall similar domes on the skulls of the chalicothere Tylocephalonyx.

It is relatively rare for brontothere skulls and jaws to be find in association with each other, something which in the past has complicated brontothere taxonomy. The skulls of some genera that fall into the Brontotheriina, such as Gnathotitan, Pollyosbornia, and Titanodectes, are either only partially known or completely unknown. This means that the appearance and size of the horns is not known for every horned brontothere.

=== Sexual dimorphism ===
The majority of modern large ungulates exhibit some level of sexual dimorphism, which suggests that brontotheres are likely to also have been sexually dimorphic. All living ungulates with horns or enlarged tusks also exhibit some level of sexual dimorphism in this feature. Based on living perissodactyls (odd-toed ungulates, to which the brontotheres belong), features likely to have been sexually dimorphic in brontotheres are body size, horn size and morphology, and the size of the incisors and canines. Observed variation in the horns, canines, and other skull features (zygomatic arches, nasal bones) has been interpreted as the result of sexual dimorphism in several horned brontotheres, including Diplacodon, Duchesneodus, and Megacerops. There is strong evidence for canine size being sexually dimorphic in several genera, including Diplacodon, Duchesneodus, Megacerops, Rhinotitan, Parvicornus, Protitan, and Eubrontotherium, but canines varied very little in others, such as Metatitan and Embolotherium.

The most direct evidence of sexual dimorphism in horned brontotheres comes from bonebeds with fossil assemblages of several individuals. Such population samples are known from some genera. Duchesneodus bonebeds has shown intrepopulation variation in the thickness of the zygomatic arches and the prominence of the domes on their skulls, probably because of sexual dimorphism. An unpublished assemblage of Embolotherium suggests that some individuals had paired horns at the top of their rams, possibly a sexually dimorphic trait.

== Evolutionary history and paleobiogeography ==
Middle–Late Eocene land mammal ages
Asia	North America
Ergilian, c. 37.8–33.9 mya	Chadronian, c. 37.0–33.7 mya
Ulangochuian, c. 39.9–37.8 mya	Duchesnean, c. 40.1–37.0 mya
Sharamurunian, c. 42.7–39.9 mya	Uintan, c. 46.3–40.1 mya
Irdinmanhan, c. 47.8–42.7 mya	Uintan, c. 46.3–40.1 mya

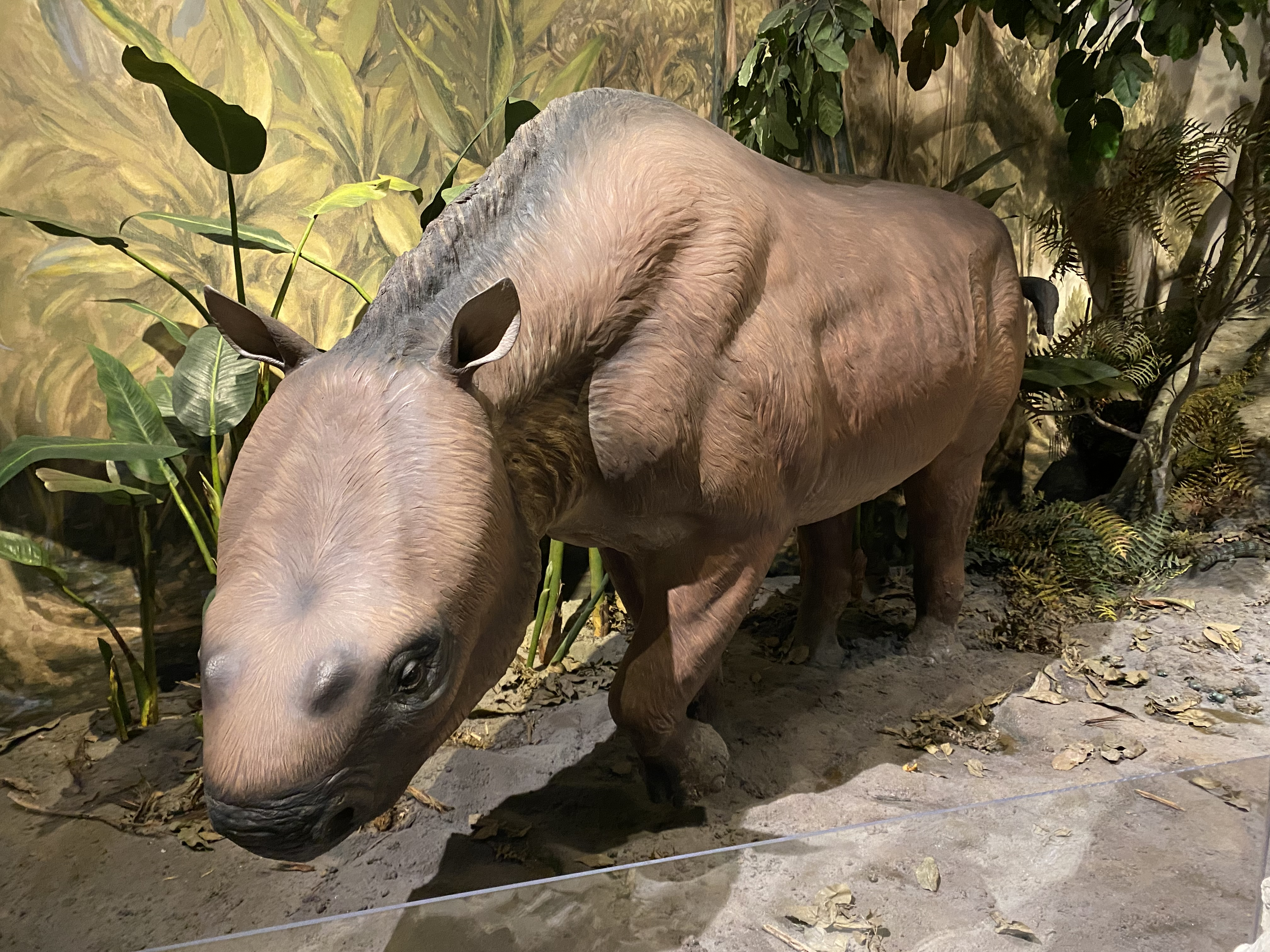
Model of Parvicornus, San Diego Natural History Museum

Studies of fossil mammals from Asia, Europe, and North America have revealed complex relationships between the mammal faunas of the different continents, and that there must have been a large number of migrations of various groups throughout the Cenozoic. This means that mammal paleobiogeography (the distribution of groups and species over geologic time) is often difficult to reconstruct. Horned brontotheres are believed to have originated in Asia because the most basal known horned brontothere, Protitan, is known from Inner Mongolia in China.

Because mammal faunas changed over time, scientists often divide the Cenozoic biochronologically into a series of "land mammal ages" based on faunal composition. Asia and North America have separate but closely correlated land mammal ages, the Asian land mammal ages (ALMA) and the North American land mammal ages (NALMA). Protitan lived during the Irdinmanhan ALMA, when horned brontotheres are first recorded in Asia. Some relatively derived embolotheres are also known from the Irdinmanhan, including Aktautitan, Gnathotitan, and Metatitan. The evolutionary origin of the embolotheres is difficult to place. Alexander Averianov and colleagues suggested in 2018 that the embolotheres may have originated in modern-day southern China, and from there spread out across Asia. Embolotheres reached eastern Europe, where there only known representative was Brachydiastematherium. (Note: Two supposed species of eubrontotheres have also been described from Europe: "Menodus"? rumelicus from Bulgaria and "Titanotherium" bohemicum from the Czech Republic. Both are based only on isolated teeth and their identification is highly dubious; the fossils of both have also been proposed to actually be Megacerops teeth imported from the United States.) Eastern Europe was biogeographically linked to Asia during the Eocene.

Horned brontotheres are first known from North America in the Uintan NALMA, when they were represented on the continent by several genera, including Diplacodon, Pollyosbornia, and Protitanotherium. Diplacodon and Protitanotherium were basal horned brontotheres, but Pollyosbornia was an embolothere, the only embolothere known from North America. The origin of the eubrontotheres is also unclear. Diplacodon and Protitanotherium are believed to be descended from Central Asian ancestors, and to have been part of an Uintan evolutionary radiation of brontotheres in North America that may have given rise to the eubrontotheres. eubrontotheres first appear in North America during the Uintan, represented by Duchesneodus and Notiotitanops. One of the most basal known eubrontotheres, Parabrontops, is known from Inner Mongolia but is also later in age than the Uintan. Dianotitan, another Asian eubrontothere, is not securely dated, but probably lived during the Irdinmanhan or later Sharamurunian ALMAs. Despite its potential early age, the phylogenetic position of Dianotitan suggests that it was descended from North American ancestors. The eubrontothere Eubrontotherium is known from both Asia and North America; in Asia it lived during the Ergilian ALMA. The North American record of Eubrontotherium is earlier, from the late Uintan or Duchesnean.

Horned brontotheres may have evolved large body sizes independently as many as three times, once in North America and perhaps in East Asia. The discovery of the embolothere Maobrontops in southern China showed that the more northern lineage leading to Embolotherium itself may have evolved a larger size independently from the southern lineage, since Embolotherium's closest relative Protembolotherium may have been smaller than Maobrontops.

Megacerops is the only known North American brontothere known to have lived during the Chadronian. Fossils of Protitanops were previously also dated to the Chadronian, but have since been redated, restricting the genus to the preceding Duchesnean. Dating of Asian horned brontotheres can vary between studies, but several genera, including Embolotherium, may have survived into the Ergilian. No brontotheres are known from the Oligocene. Based on their size and the diverse developments of the horns across different lineages, they apparently died out at the peak of their evolutionary development. Various explanations have been proposed for their relatively sudden disappearance. Prothero has attributed brontothere extinction to the Eocene–Oligocene extinction event, when a period of glaciation led to large-scale environmental changes and coincided with extinctions in several different mammal groups.
