= Aktautitan =

Aktautitan Temporal range: Middle Eocene (Irdinmanhan), 47.8–42.7 Ma

Scientific classification
- Kingdom: Animalia
- Phylum: Chordata
- Class: Mammalia
- Order: Perissodactyla
- Family: †Brontotheriidae
- Subfamily: †Brontotheriinae
- Tribe: †Brontotheriini
- Subtribe: †Brontotheriina
- Infratribe: †Embolotheriita
- Genus: †Aktautitan; Mihlbachler et al., 2004
- Species: †A. hippopotamopus

Binomial name
- †Aktautitan hippopotamopus Mihlbachler et al., 2004

Extinct genus of brontothere

Aktautitan is an extinct genus of horned brontothere that lived in Central Asia during the Middle Eocene, in the Irdinmanhan land mammal age. The genus contains a single species, A. hippopotamopus, known from Kazakhstan.

== Description ==
Aktautitan has small horns on the nasal, which are highly placed compared to the orbits. The zygomatic arches are straight, while postzygomatic processes are absent. The upper incisors are large and tightly packed, with the dental formula being 3.1.4.33.1.4.3. Compared to other brontotheres, the postcanine diastema (the tooth gap between canines and cheek teeth) is rather small. The upper fourth premolar lacks a hypocone, unlike most other brontotheres. In terms of postcrania, the humerus is similar to those of the related Metatitan. The radius and ulna are straight, and the forelimbs bear 4 digits. The carpus is broad, while the metacarpals are shortened. The femur has a curved shaft and a flattened femoral head. Similar to the forefeet, the metacarpals of the hindfeet are also shortened, with the amount of digits unknown. Morphologically, Aktautitan has been compared to the rhinoceratoid Teleoceras and the notoungulate Toxodon, with the short limb proportions of all 3 species being similar to those of the extant Hippopotamus. This similar body plan is due to convergent evolution.

== Paleoecology ==
Known from the lacustrine Kyzylbulak Formation, Aktautitan fossils are often found positioned in a way that indicates they died on the banks of rivers or within marshes, which complicates many proposed theories about the lifestyle of the genus. It was assumed that, due to the limb proportions, Aktautitan was a semi-aquatic grazer, though the microwear on the teeth of other brontotheres strongly supports a browsing diet. Hypothesized diets for Aktautitan include being a low browser and a grazer of aquatic vegetation, though the data is deficient to definitively identify which lifestyle is more probable.

== Classification ==
Aktautitan is placed within the infratribe Embolotheriita, and is most closely related to Gnathotitan and Pollyosbornia.

Cladogram after Mihlbachler (2008);

- Embolotheriita
  - - Aktautitan
    - - Pollyosbornia
      - Gnathotitan
  - - - Pygmaetitan
      - - Brachydiastematherium
        - Metatitan
      - - - Nasamplus
          - - Protembolotherium
            - Embolotherium
