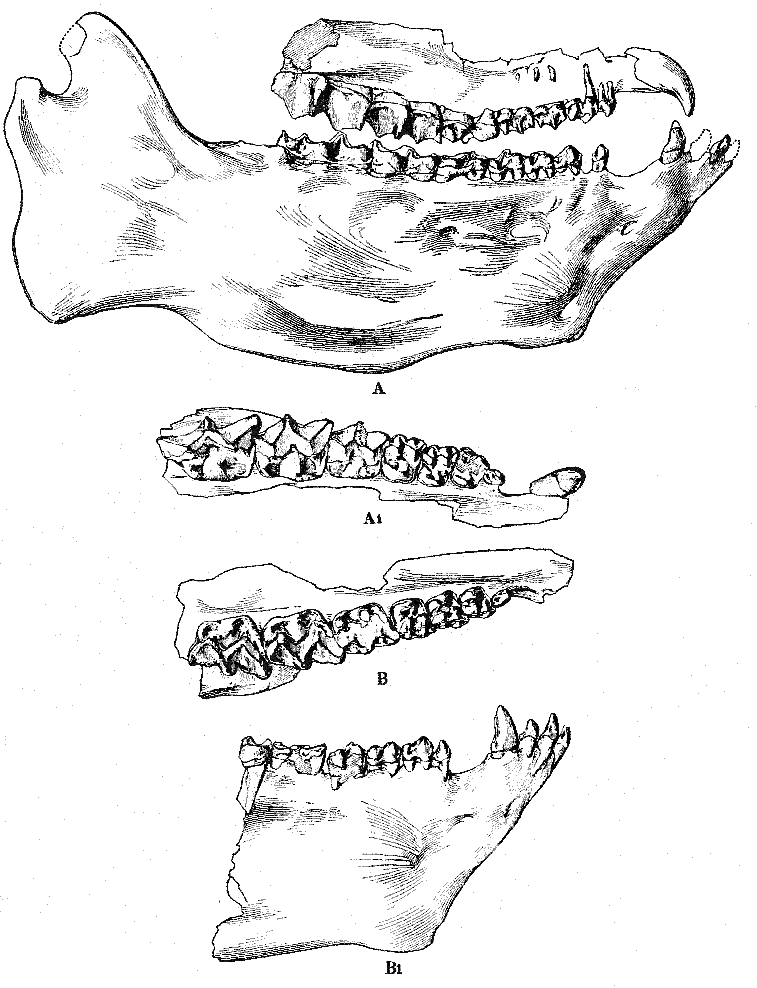
- Holotype of G. berkeyi

Scientific classification
- Kingdom: Animalia
- Phylum: Chordata
- Class: Mammalia
- Order: Perissodactyla
- Family: †Brontotheriidae
- Subfamily: †Brontotheriinae
- Tribe: †Brontotheriini
- Subtribe: †Brontotheriina
- Infratribe: †Embolotheriita
- Genus: †Gnathotitan; Granger & Gregory, 1943

Species
- G. berkeyi (Granger & Gregory, 1943)

= Gnathotitan =

Gnathotitan Temporal range: Middle Eocene (Irdinmanhan), 47.8–42.7 Ma

Extinct genus of brontothere

Gnathotitan is an extinct genus of horned brontothere that lived in East Asia during the Middle Eocene, in the Irdinmanhan land mammal age. A single species is known, G. berkeyi, known from Inner Mongolia, China.

== Description ==
The jaw of Gnathotitan was remarkably large for a brontothere, with the lower jaw measuring 800 millimeters from the end of the jaw to the incisive border. The jaw is incredibly deep, and the molars are significantly larger than other brontotheres. The tips of the canine teeth are recurved, whilst the incisors are spoon-shaped. The horns are not present in any specimens, but it is inferred that they possessed them. The postcrania of Gnathotitan are unknown, but close relatives have a rather stout build similar to Teleoceras and Toxodon.

== Classification ==
It has been hypothesized the related genus Sphenocoelus was ancestral to Gnathotitan historically, but recent phylogenies do not support this. Currently, the genus is placed within the infratribe Embolotheriita. Currently, Gnathotitan is considered a sister taxon to Pollyosbornia.

Cladogram after Mihlbachler (2008);

- Embolotheriita
  - - Aktautitan
    - - Pollyosbornia
      - Gnathotitan
  - - - Pygmaetitan
      - - Brachydiastematherium
        - Metatitan
      - - - Nasamplus
          - - Protembolotherium
            - Embolotherium
