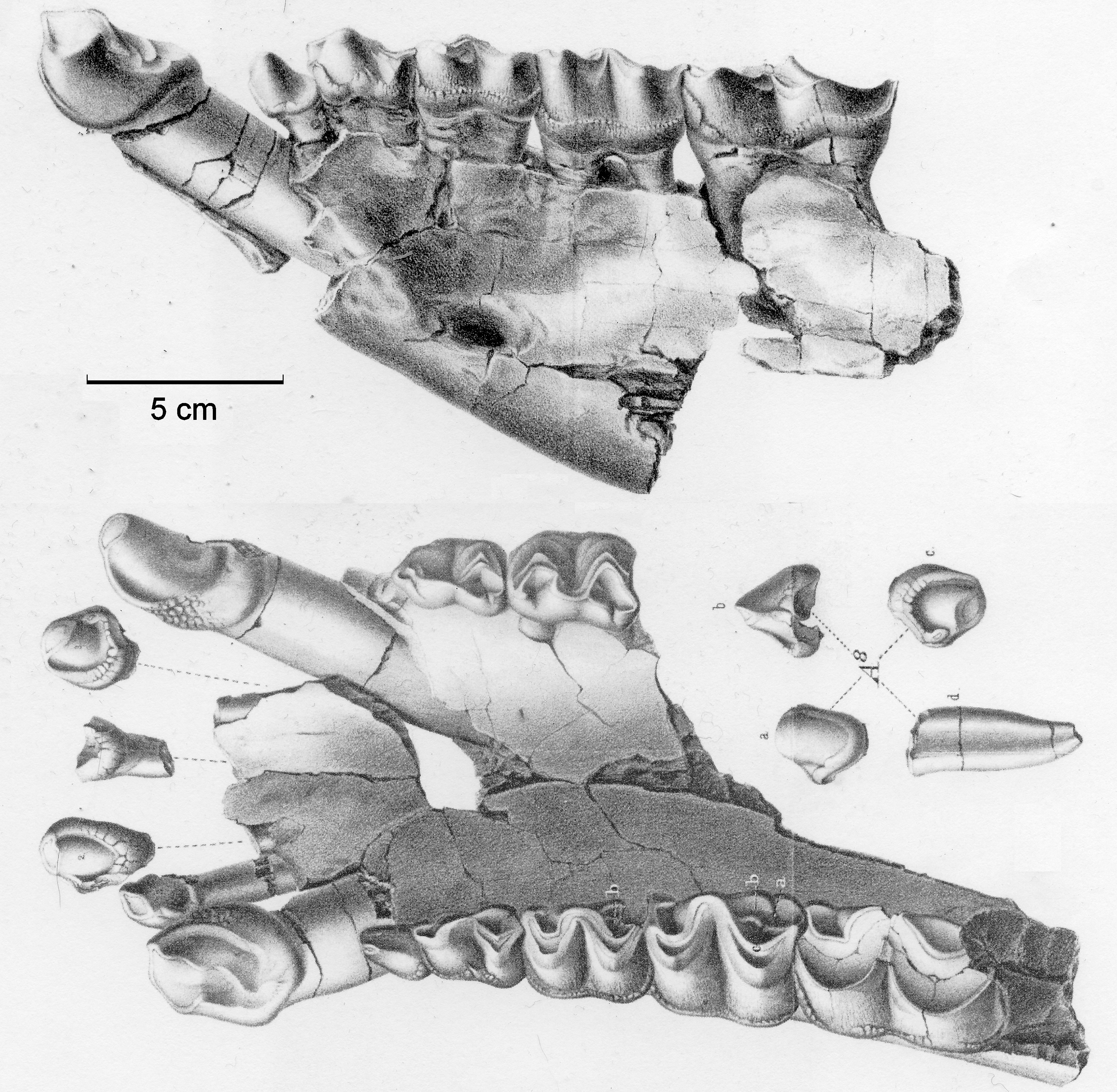
- Holotype of B. transylvanicum.

Scientific classification
- Kingdom: Animalia
- Phylum: Chordata
- Class: Mammalia
- Infraclass: Placentalia
- Order: Perissodactyla
- Family: †Brontotheriidae
- Subfamily: †Brontotheriinae
- Tribe: †Brontotheriini
- Subtribe: †Brontotheriina
- Infratribe: †Embolotheriita
- Genus: †Brachydiastematherium; Böckh & Matyasovski, 1876
- Species: †B. transylvanicum

Binomial name
- †Brachydiastematherium transylvanicum Böckh & Matyasovski, 1876

= Brachydiastematherium =

Brachydiastematherium Temporal range: Middle Eocene

Extinct genus of perissodactyl

Brachydiastematherium (lit. 'short diastema beast') is an extinct genus of horned brontothere that lived in Eastern Europe during the Middle Eocene. It is the westernmost species of brontothere, with the first fossils of it being found in Transylvania, Romania. Only the type species, B. transylvanicum, is known.

== Description ==
In comparison with other brontothere fossils, it is suggested that B. transylvanicum would have had an elongated head, not unlike Dolichorhinus, and be about 2 meters at the withers (anatomically speaking, the highest part of the back at the base of the neck). The name of Brachydiastematherium comes from the fact that the genus lacks a large diastema (tooth gap) between the canines and the premolars. This trait is shared by another genus, Metatitan, which also shares the unique trait of a molariform metaconid.

== Phylogeny ==
Most phylogenies support the idea that Brachydiastematherium is closest to Metatitan among the embolotheres, due to aforementioned morphological similarity in dental structure.

Cladogram after Mihlbachler (2008):

- Embolotheriita
  - - Aktautitan
    - - Pollyosbornia
      - Gnathotitan
  - - - Pygmaetitan
      - - Brachydiastematherium
        - Metatitan
      - - - Nasamplus
          - - Protembolotherium
            - Embolotherium
