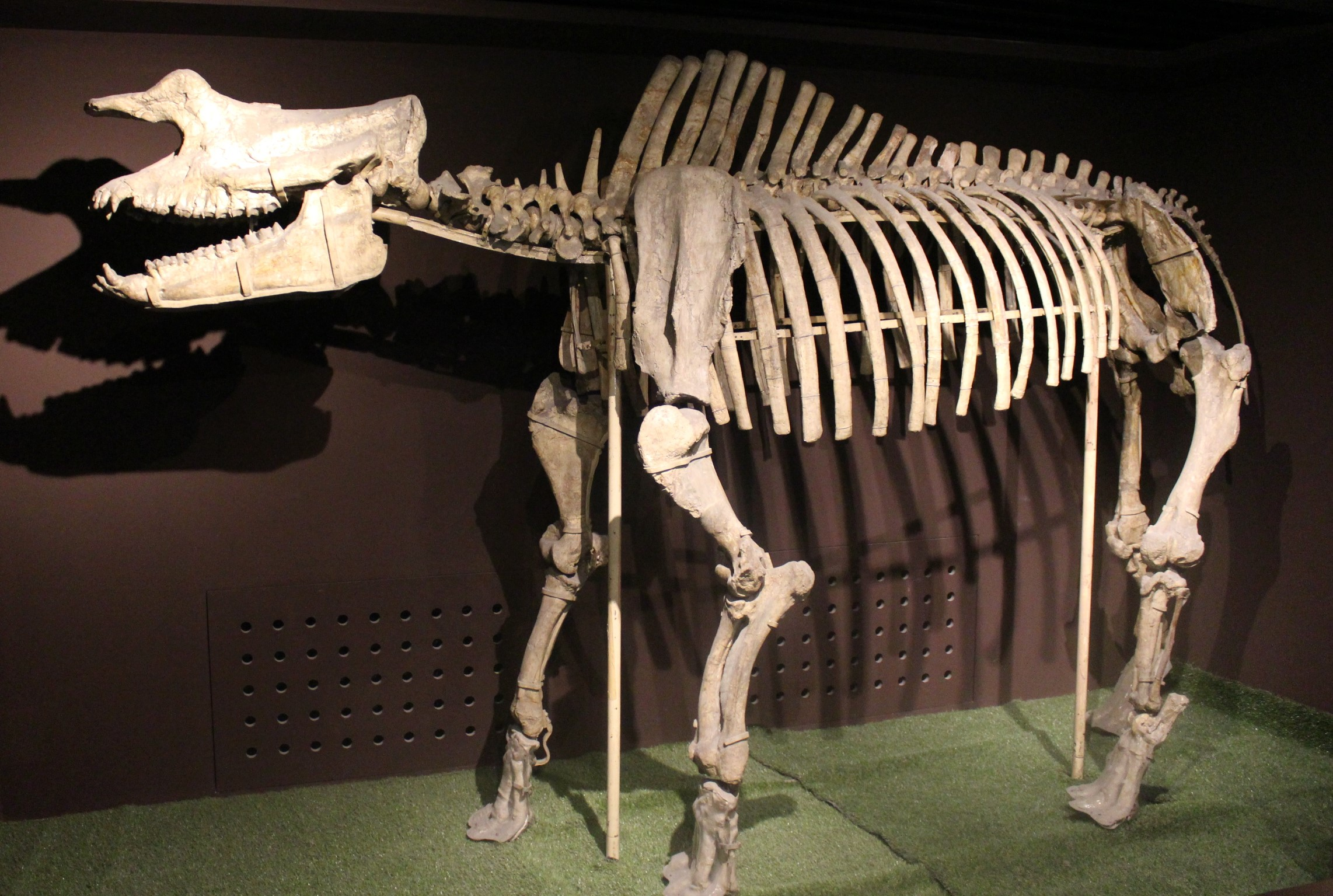
- Mounted skeleton of R. andrewsi, Paleozoological Museum of China.

Scientific classification
- Kingdom: Animalia
- Phylum: Chordata
- Class: Mammalia
- Order: Perissodactyla
- Family: †Brontotheriidae
- Subfamily: †Brontotheriinae
- Tribe: †Brontotheriini
- Subtribe: †Brontotheriina
- Genus: †Rhinotitan; Granger & Gregory, 1943

Type species
- †Dolichorhinus kaiseni (original combination) Osborn, 1925

Species
- †R. andrewsi (Osborn, 1925); †R. kaiseni (Osborn, 1925)

= Rhinotitan =

Rhinotitan Temporal range: Middle Eocene (Sharamurunian), 42.7–39.9 Ma

Extinct genus of mammals

Rhinotitan (lit. 'nose titan') is an extinct genus of horned brontothere that lived in East Asia during the Middle Eocene, in the Sharamurunian land mammal age. Several species of Rhinotitan have been named, but only two are currently recognized as valid, R. kaiseni and R. andrewsi, both known from the Shara Murun Formation in Inner Mongolia, China.

== Research history ==
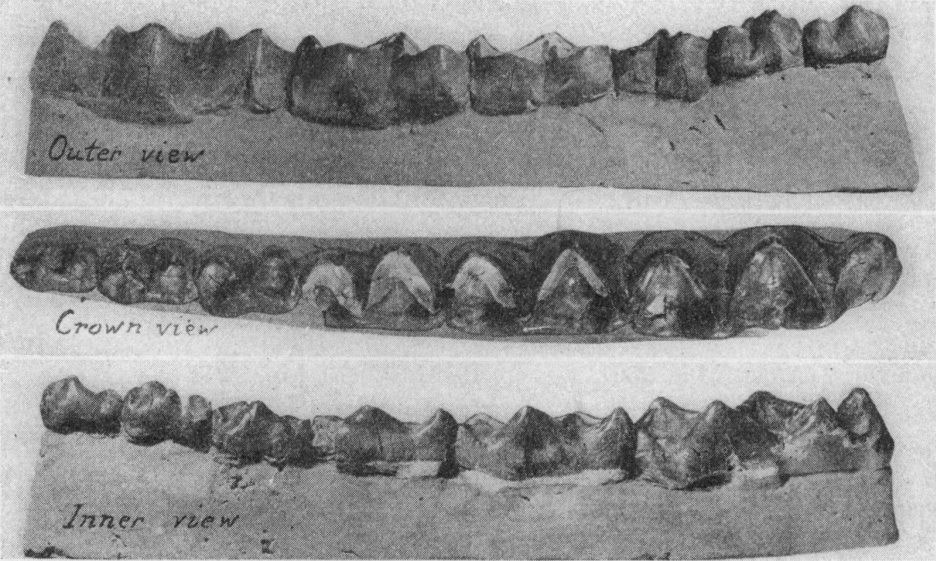
AMNH 18653, the type specimen of Protitanotherium mongoliense (later Rhinotitan mongoliensis)

Fossils of Rhinotitan were first discovered by the Third Asiatic Expedition of the American Museum of Natural History, in 1922 and 1923. The first brontothere fossil found by the expedition to reach the museum and be described were a partial lower jaw with much of the dentition preserved (AMNH 18653), found in the Shara Murun Formation of Inner Mongolia, China. In 1923, Henry Fairfield Osborn named the new species Protitanotherium mongoliense based on AMNH 18653. Osborn was inconsistent in his approach to brontothere taxonomy. Whereas he tended to oversplit North American brontothere into an unrealistically large number of species and genera, he tended to refer often distinct Asian brontotheres to known North American genera.

In 1925, Osborn described two additional brontothere species from the Shara Murun Formation, based on fossils found by the Third Asiatic Expedition: Dolichorhinus kaiseni and Protitanotherium andrewsi. P. andrewsi was named in honor of Roy Chapman Andrews, who had led the Third Asiatic Expedition, and D. kaiseni was named in honor of Peter Kaisen, an expedition member. Osborn assigned numerous specimens, including skulls and jaws, to both D. kaiseni and P. andrewsi, and additional fossils were also assigned to P. mongoliense. The type of D. kaiseni is AMNH 20252, a skull and jaw, and that of P. andrewsi is AMNH 20271, a complete skull. Osborn also proposed AMNH 20263, a fossil palate with complete dentition, as the neotype specimen of P. mongoliense, though it was pure conjecture that this fossil belonged to the same species as AMNH 18653.

In 1943, Walter W. Granger and William King Gregory revised the taxonomy of the brontothere fossils known from Mongolia and Inner Mongolia. Granger and Gregory named the new genus Rhinotitan to encompass Osborn's three species from the Shara Murun Formation, with Rhinotitan kaiseni designated as the type species. Granger and Gregory noted that Rhinotitan was similar to the North American Dolichorhinus but that several features, such as the much larger and wider cheek teeth, suggested a close relationship to the fellow Asian brontothere genus Protitan, from which Granger and Gregory believed it had descended. Granger and Gregory accepted all three of Osborn's species as species of Rhinotitan, and used relatively dubious differences to distinguish them from each other; R. kaiseni and R. andrewsi were distinguished by R. andrewsi's larger size and narrower fourth premolar. R. mongoliensis was distinguished from R. andrewsi based on the dental features of AMNH 20263, Osborn's proposed neotype of P. mongoliense. If all Rhinotitan specimens in the American Museum of Natural History are taken into account, Granger and Gregory's species distinctions do not work, as the dental features that supposedly distinguish the three species are bridged by certain fossils. Granger and Gregory recognized this, but proposed that R. kaiseni, R. mongoliensis, and R. andrewsi formed an evolutionary series.

In 1957, N. M. Yanovskaya named the new species R. orientalis, based on several fragmentary teeth and bones (treated as a single individual, PIN 858) from the "Artyom mammal locality", a coal mine located north of Vladivostok in easternmost Russia. In 1962, Xu Yu-Xuan and Chiu C. S. described the species R. quadridens based on series of cheek teeth (IVPP V.2651) from the Lumeiyi Formation in Yunnan, China.

In 2008, Matthew C. Mihlbachler proposed that the differences between Rhinotitan fossils were not due to them forming an evolutionary series, but rather mostly due to individual variation within species, a hypothesis that is supported by similar variation in tooth morphology having been observed in other brontothere species, and almost all known Rhinotitan fossils are from the same horizon and locality. Mihlbachler recognized only two valid species in the Rhinotitan fossil assemblage, R. kaiseni and R. andrewsi. These two species can be distinguished from each other by several features, such as the position of the horns, the shape of the nasal process, features of the upper incisors, and the width of the basicranium (the hindmost part of the skull). Since the morphology of the cheek teeth were determined to not distinguish between species, R. mongoliensis was designated as a nomen dubium. Mihlbachler also designated both R. orientalis and R. quadridens as nomina dubia. R. orientalis was suggested to possibly be chimeric since there is no evidence that the fragments are from a single animal, and lacks diagnostic features. R. orientalis also lacks diagnostic features and cannot be distinguished from almost any of the known large Asian brontotheres.

== Description ==
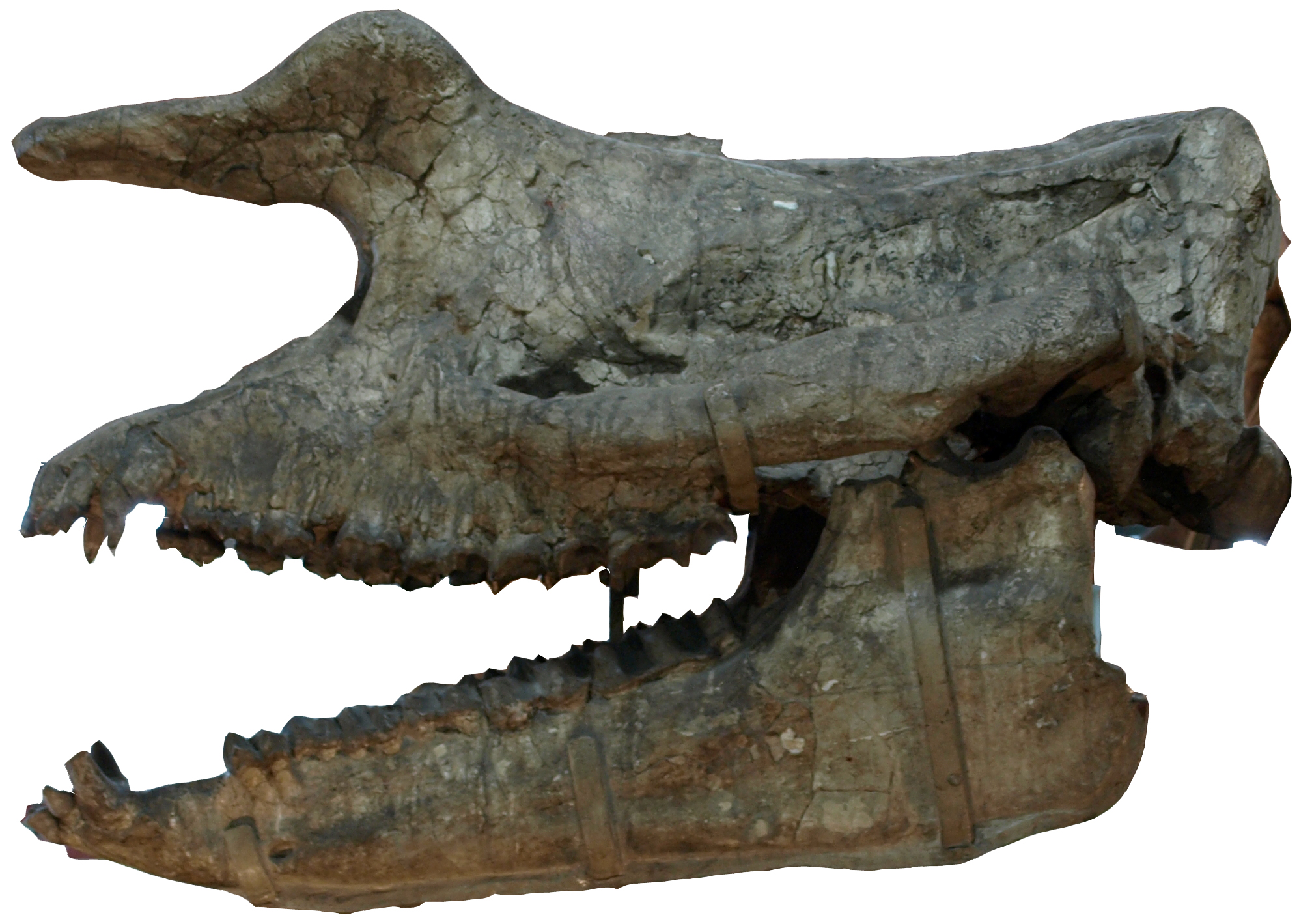
Skull of R. andrewsi

Rhinotitan was a moderate-sized to large brontothere. R. andrewsi was larger than R. kaiseni, but probably not so much larger that individuals of both species did not overlap each other in size. R. andrewsi has been estimated to have reached a body mass of 2,027 kilograms (4,469 lb), and R. kaiseni to have reached 1,686 kilograms (3,717 lb).

Rhinotitan had a long skull, with long nasal bones and a short occiput (back of the skull). It had small horns, placed high above the orbits (eye sockets) up on the nasal process. The horns projected nearly horizontally out towards the side.
