= Metatitan =

Metatitan Temporal range: Middle–Late Eocene (Irdinmanhan–Ulangochuian), 47.8–37.8 Ma

Scientific classification
- Kingdom: Animalia
- Phylum: Chordata
- Class: Mammalia
- Order: Perissodactyla
- Family: †Brontotheriidae
- Subfamily: †Brontotheriinae
- Tribe: †Brontotheriini
- Subtribe: †Brontotheriina
- Infratribe: †Embolotheriita
- Genus: †Metatitan; Granger and Gregory, 1943

Species
- M. khaitshinus (Yanovskaya, 1954); M. primus (Granger and Gregory, 1943); M. relictus (Granger and Gregory, 1943)

Extinct genus of brontothere

Metatitan is an extinct genus of horned brontothere that lived in East Asia during the Middle to Late Eocene, from the Irdinmanhan to Ulangochuian land mammal ages.

== Description ==
Metatitan is known from cranial and mandibular remains. The genus has wide nasals and a small post-canine diastema. The canines of Metatitan are enlarged. They had nasal horns similar to other brontotheres, with the horns pointing forwards in all species. Uniquely, the horns of even the latest species are smaller in comparison to contemporary brontotheres. The molars are elongate and crowned, whilst the incisors are small. The incisor formula of Metatitan is closer to more basal brontotheres than more derived members of the clade.

== Classification ==
Metatitan is currently considered a relative of Gnathotitan and Embolotherium, and is suspected to have evolved from Rhinotitan. Historically, it was suggested that Metatitan represents females of Embolotherium, as a form of sexual dimorphism, though this is not generally accepted. A generic synonymy with Brachydiastematherium has also been proposed, though some other researchers do not affirm such synonymy.
