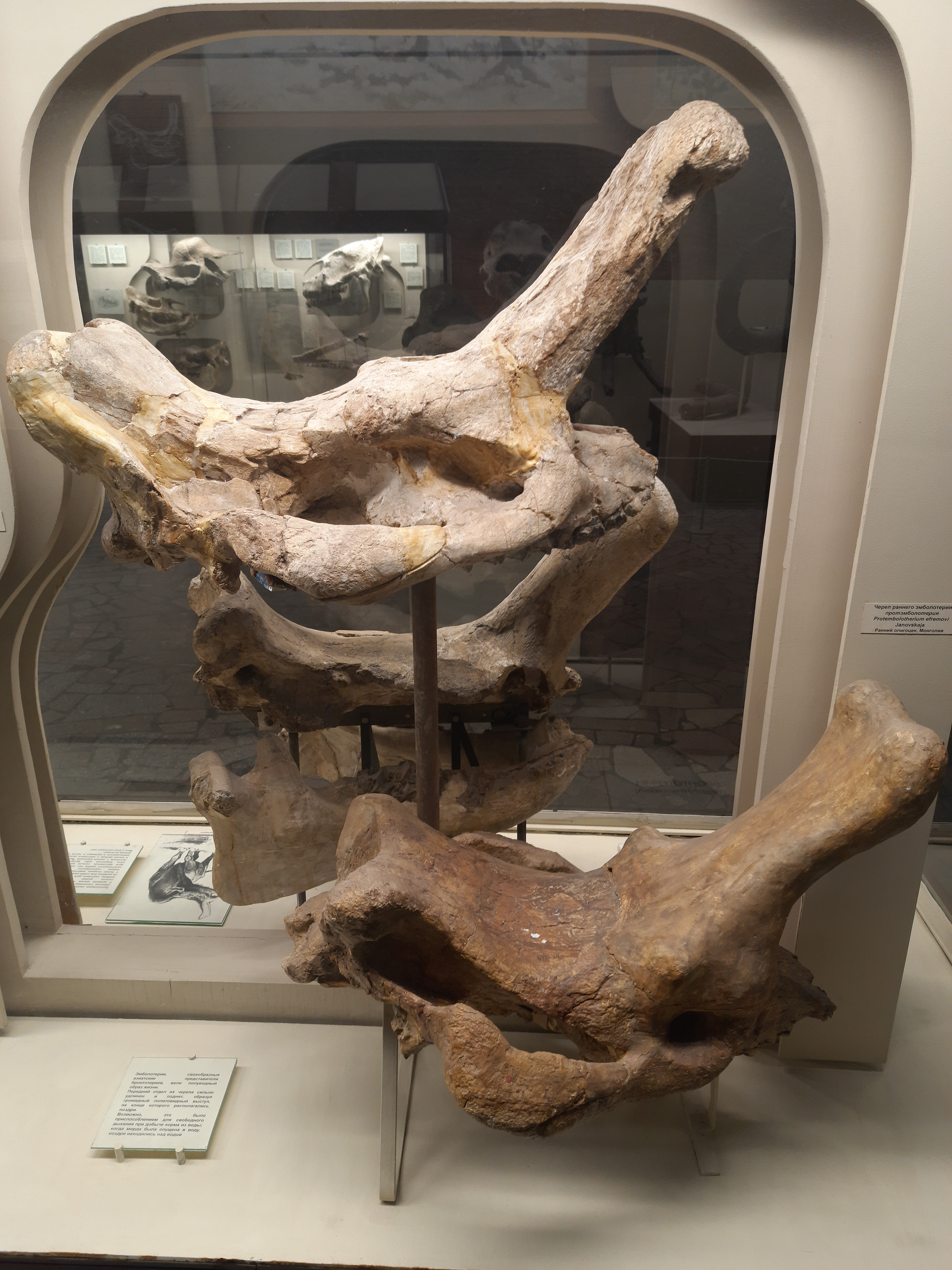
- Skulls of P. efremovi, Moscow Paleontological Museum

Scientific classification
- Kingdom: Animalia
- Phylum: Chordata
- Class: Mammalia
- Order: Perissodactyla
- Family: †Brontotheriidae
- Subfamily: †Brontotheriinae
- Tribe: †Brontotheriini
- Subtribe: †Brontotheriina
- Infratribe: †Embolotheriita
- Genus: †Protembolotherium; Yanovskaya, 1954
- Species: †P. efremovi

Binomial name
- †Protembolotherium efremovi Yanovskaya, 1954

= Protembolotherium =

Protembolotherium Temporal range: Late Eocene (Ergilian (Note: Mihlbachler (2008) dates Protembolotherium efremovi to the "Ulangochuian [Ergilian] land mammal age". Bai et al. (2020) dates Protembolotherium to the Ergilian, the land mammal age that corresponds to the fauna of the Ergilin Dzo Formation.)), 37.8–33.9 Ma

Extinct genus of mammals

Protembolotherium (lit. 'first battering ram beast') is an extinct genus of horned brontothere that lived in East Asia during the Late Eocene, in the Ergilian land mammal age. A single species of Protembolotherium is recognized, P. efremovi, known from the Ergilin Dzo Formation in Mongolia.

Protembolotherium was a large brontothere, surpassing two tonnes in weight. Other than the larger and better known Embolotherium, Protembolotherium is the only brontothere known to have had an elongated "ram"-like protuberance at the front of its skull, likely supporting a large nasal cavity. Compared to the ram of Embolotherium, that of Protembolotherium was not as elaborate. In addition to the ram, Protembolotherium also had an additional pair of small horns above the orbits (eye sockets).

== Research history ==
Protembolotherium efremovi was described by Nataliia Mikhailovna Yanovskaya in 1954, based on two skulls and several other fossils found in the lower part of the Ergilin Dzo Formation in Dornogobi, Mongolia. Yanovskaya designated PIN 473-311 as the type specimen; this skull is only partially preserved, and lacks most of the nasal bones. The other skull referred to the genus by Yanovskaya was PIN 473-310, which preserves the ram-like protuberance at the front of the skull. In 1980, Yanovskaya referred an additional skull from the Ergilin Dzo Formation, PIN 3109-40, to P. efremovi. Yanovskaya also referred several more fragmentary specimens to P. efremovi, including jaws, but the location of these specimens is unclear and they have been argued to be non-diagnostic.

== Description ==
Protembolotherium was a large brontothere, estimated to have reached a body mass of 2,584 kilograms (5,697 lb).

Protembolotherium is the only horned brontothere other than Embolotherium in which the horns are fused into an elongated ram-like structure. Since the ram of Protembolotherium is shorter and less elaborate, it has been interpreted as a transitional form between more primitive horned brontotheres and Embolotherium. Protembolotherium is distinguished from Embolotherium in that it in addition to the ram also had an additional pair of short horns above the orbits (eye sockets).

Several additional features closely link Protembolotherium to Embolotherium, including the saddle-shaped skull, the wide upper surface of the skull and expanded zygomatic arches, and several characteristics of the teeth. Several features also distinguish the two, such as the skull of Embolotherium being even more deeply saddle-shaped, the occiput (the furthest back portion of the skull) is shorter and more upright, the shorter ram, the additional horns, and the steep upwards slope at the dorsal (upward-facing) part of the rostrum.
