= Duchesne River Formation =

Geologic formation in northeastern Utah, USA

- Stratigraphic range: Middle Eocene
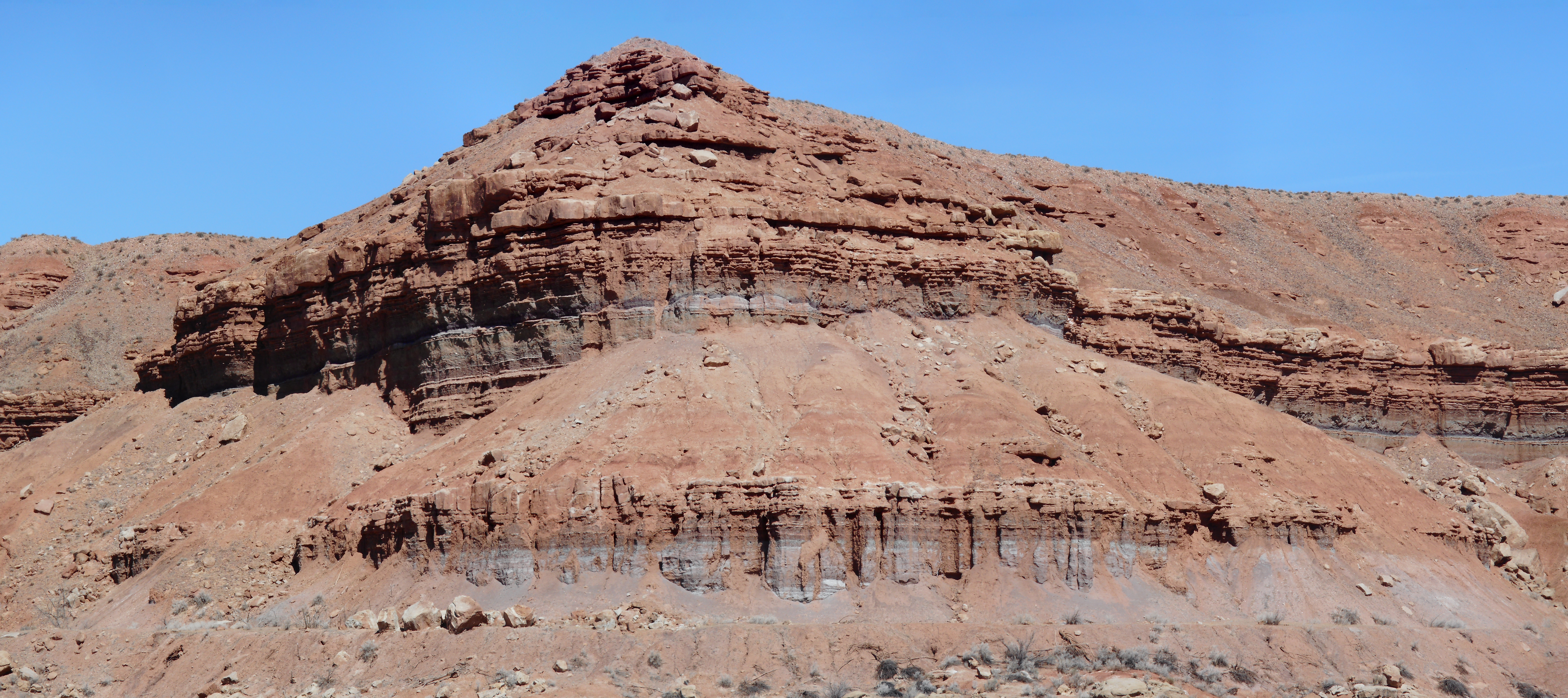
- Duchesne River Formation outcrop near Roosevelt, Utah
- Type: Formation
- Sub-units: Brennan Basin Member, Dry Gulch Creek Member, Lapoint Member, Starr Flat Member
- Underlies: Bishop Conglomerate
- Overlies: Uinta Formation
- Area: Duchesne and Uinta Counties, northeastern Utah

Lithology
- Primary: sandstone, mudstone, conglomerate
- Other: siltstone, tuff

Location
- Region: Utah
- Country: United States

Type section
- Named for: Duchesne River

The Duchesne River Formation is a Middle Eocene geologic formation in the Uinta Basin of northeastern Utah. It was originally named the Duchesne Formation by Carnegie Museum paleontologist O.A. Peterson, and modified to the Duchesne River Formation by Carnegie Museum paleontologist J.L. Kay, because the term Duschesne Formation was already in use for a Jurassic limestone. Peterson did not provide a type section when naming the formation, only noting that it is named for the Duchesne River, which flows roughly southeast and east to join the Green River.

The formation consists of over 3000 feet (915 m) of fluvial (river-carried) conglomerate, sandstone and fine-grained sedimentary rocks. It is subdivided into four members (below), whose sediments are thought to have eroded from the rising Uinta Mountains to the north and deposited in rivers, floodplains and small lakes.

== Age ==
Volcanic ash beds in the formation, sourced derived from volcanoes in the Wasatch Range, East Tintic, and Oquirrh Mountains to the west, have provided radiometric dates for the formation. Dates collected in 1990 range from 38.2 +/-1.8 Ma for the Brennan Basin Member to 28.7 +/-2.0 Ma for the Lapoint Member. These estimate turned out to be too young according to follow-up studies.

A 1992 survey dated an ash bed at the base of the Lapoint Member to 39.74 ± 0.07 Ma, and a 2012 study recalibrated this dating to 40.26 ± 0.08 Ma. Another recent (2020) dating of ash beds results in an age of 39.47 ± 0.16 Ma in the upper Dry Gulch member and 39.36 ± 0.15 Ma in the lower Lapoint Member.

== Members ==
The following members were defined by Andersen and Picard (1972): Prior to this more formal usage, Kay (1934) used a three-fold division at his fossil quarry: the Randlett, Halfway, and Lapoint horizons. The Randlett horizon is equivalent to most of the Brennan Basin Member, the Halfway horizon is equivalent to the uppermost Brennan Basin and entire Dry Gulch members, and the Lapoint horizon is equivalent to the Lapoint and Starr Flat member.

=== Brennan Basin Member ===
Named for the Brennan Basin in Uintah County. Predominately sandstone that varies from yellow-gray to red brown, very fine, fine, medium, to coarse grained, thin to thick to very thick bedded, generally poorly sorted, and may be nodular, silty, pebbly, and cross stratified. Minor beds of green-gray to red brown, silty to sandy, thin to very thin bedded, poorly sorted claystone, red brown, thin-bedded, nodular, poorly sorted mudstone, yellow brown, very thin bedded, nodular, poorly sorted, horizontally stratified siltstone, and red-purple, sandy, clayey, thin-bedded, medium to coarse crystalline limestone. Contains a diverse late Eocene vertebrate fauna.

=== Dry Gulch Creek Member ===
Named for Dry Gulch Creek in Uintah County. Consists of pale red, olive gray to yellow brown, coarse, medium, fine to very fine grained, thin-, thick to very thick bedded, massive, moderately to poorly sorted sandstone that may be horizontally or cross stratified and red, gray to brown, very thin, thin- to thick-bedded, moderately to poorly sorted claystone that may be nodular, micaceous, or laminated. Contains plant remains and a sparse vertebrate fauna.

=== Lapoint Member ===
Duchesne River Formation (Lapoint Member) outcrop near Lapoint, Utah

Named for the town of Lapoint in Uintah County. Composed of olive, green-gray, dark gray, very thin to thin bedded, nodular, poorly sorted, horizontally stratified, laminated claystone; light gray, light brown, gray orange to red brown, thin-bedded, slabby, horizontally stratified, poorly sorted, medium-grained, to thick-bedded, blocky, poorly sorted, coarse-grained sandstone; gray-red to red-brown, thin-bedded, nodular, horizontally stratified, poorly sorted siltstone; and gray-orange, very thick bedded, massive, poorly sorted pebble conglomerate. Abundant late Eocene vertebrates.

=== Starr Flat ===
Named for John Starr Flat in Duchesne County. Consists of: 1) red- to yellow-brown, light gray, gray- to yellow-orange, pale red to gray red sandstone that ranges from coarse, medium, fine to very fine grained, thin, thick to very thick bedded, sandy, silty, to clayey, cross-stratified to horizontally stratified, flaggy, blocky, massive, brown-gray, gray-red to olive, sandy to silty; 2) very thin bedded, poorly sorted, platy, laminated, nodular to massive claystone; and 3) gray red, sandy, poorly sorted, thin-bedded, nodular, massive siltstone. Sandstone may also be poorly sorted, pebbly, nodular and massive. No fossils found expect for indeterminate artiodactyl fragments.

== Paleobiota ==
The Randlett fauna (lower Brennan Basin Member) can safely be assigned to the Uintan 3 North American Land Mammal Age (NALMA). On the geomagnetic polarity time scale, it corresponds to the upper part of chron C19r or lower part of chron C19n.

The Halfway and Lapoint faunas (uppermost Brennan Basin, Dry Gulch Creek, and Lapoint members) belong to the Duchesnean NALMA, which is named after the Duchesne River Formation. They both correspond to the upper part of chron C18r.

=== Mammalia ===
==== Artiodactyla ====
An indeterminate oromerycid is known from the Brennan Basin Member. Reports of Helohyus teeth are probably misidentifications.

Artiodactyls of the Duchesne River Formation
Genus / Taxon	Species	Member	Notes	Images
Agriochoerus	A. maximus	Lapoint Member	An agriochoerid (semi-arboreal oreodont relative)	
Brachyhyops	B. wyomingensis	Lapoint Member	An entelodont (boar-like hippo relative)	
Diplobunops	D. crassus	Brennan Basin Member	An agriochoerid (semi-arboreal oreodont relative)	
Hypertragulidae	sp.	"Randlett"	An indeterminate hypertragulid	
Leptotragulus	L. proavus	Brennan Basin Member	A protoceratid	
Pentacemylus	P. progressus	Brennan Basin Member	A homacodontid	
Poabromylus	P. kayi	Dry Gulch Creek Member, Lapoint Member	A protoceratid	
Protoreodon	P. primus	Brennan Basin Member	An agriochoerid (semi-arboreal oreodont relative)	
Protoreodon	P. pumilus	Brennan Basin Member	An agriochoerid (semi-arboreal oreodont relative)	
Protoreodon	P. sp. cf. P. pumilus	Lapoint Member	An agriochoerid (semi-arboreal oreodont relative)	
Simimeryx	S. minutus	Lapoint Member	An early ruminant, possibly a hypertragulid	

==== Carnivoramorphs ====
A large indeterminate carnivoran, possibly a miacid or amphicyonid, is known from the Lapoint Member.

Carnivoramorphs of the Duchesne River Formation
Genus / Taxon	Species	Member	Notes	Images
Eosictis	E. avinoffi	Dry Gulch Creek Member or Lapoint Member	An indeterminate carnivoran	
Hyaenodon	H. sp. cf. H. vetus	Lapoint Member	A hyaenodontine hyaenodont	
Pleurocyon? or Uintacyon?	sp.	"Randlett"	An indeterminate carnivoran	
Simidectes	S. sp. cf. S. magnus	Brennan Basin Member	An early carnivoramorph	

==== Eulipotyphla ====
Another indeterminate eulipotyphlan species is known from the Dry Gulch Creek Member.

Eulipotyphlans of the Duchesne River Formation
Genus / Taxon	Species	Member	Notes	Images
Centetodon	C. sp.	Lapoint Member	A geolabidid. Previously identified as Protictops alticuspidens.	

==== Lagomorpha ====
Lagomorphs of the Duchesne River Formation
Genus / Taxon	Species	Member	Notes	Images
Mytonolagus	M. sp.	Brennan Basin Member, Dry Gulch Creek Member	An early leporid (rabbit)	

==== Mesonychia ====
Mesonychians of the Duchesne River Formation
Genus / Taxon	Species	Member	Notes	Images
Hessolestes	H. ultimus	Lapoint Member	A mesonychid	

==== Metatheria ====
Metatherians of the Duchesne River Formation
Genus / Taxon	Species	Member	Notes	Images
Copedelphys	C. sp.	Dry Gulch Creek Member	A herpetotheriid	

==== Perissodactyla ====
Perissodactyls of the Duchesne River Formation
Genus / Taxon	Species	Member	Notes	Images
Colodon	C. sp.	Lapoint Member	A helaletid (tapir relative)	
Dilophodon	D. leotanus	Brennan Basin Member	A helaletid (tapir relative). Sometimes considered a species of Heteraletes.	
cf. Diplacodon	cf. D. elatus	Brennan Basin Member	A brontothere	
Duchesneodus	D. uintensis	Brennan Basin Member, Dry Gulch Creek Member, Lapoint Member	A brontothere, previously identified as "Teleodus" or Protitanotherium.	
Epihippus (Duchesnehippus)	E. (D.) intermedius	Dry Gulch Creek Member, Lapoint Member	An early equid (horse)	
Epitriplopus	E. medius	Brennan Basin Member	A hyracodontid ("running rhino")	
Hyracodon	H. medius	Lapoint Member	A hyracodontid ("running rhino"). The species H. medius was previously treated as belonging to the distinct genus "Mesamynodon".	
Hyracodon	H. primus	Lapoint Member	A hyracodontid ("running rhino"). The species H. medius was previously treated as belonging to the distinct genus "Mesamynodon".	
Megalamynodon	M. regalis	Brennan Basin Member	An amynodontid (hippo-like rhino)	
Uintaceras	U. sp.	Brennan Basin Member	A rhinocerotoid (rhino relative)	

==== Rodentia ====
An indeterminate sciuravid or myomorph is known from the Brennan Basin Member, and an indeterminate myomorph is known from the Dry Gulch Creek Member.

Rodents of the Duchesne River Formation
Genus / Taxon	Species	Member	Notes	Images
Adjidaumo	A. sp. cf. A. craigi	Dry Gulch Creek Member	An eomyid	
Eutypomys	E. sp.	Dry Gulch Creek Member	A eutypomyid	
Griphomys	G. sp.	Dry Gulch Creek Member	An indeterminate rodent.	
Heliscomys	H. sp.	Dry Gulch Creek Member	A heliscomyid	
Metanoiamys	M. lacus	Dry Gulch Creek Member	An eomyid	
Metanoiamys	M. sp. cf. M. korthi	Dry Gulch Creek Member	An eomyid	
Microeutypomys	M. sp.	Dry Gulch Creek Member	A eutypomyid	
Mytonomys	M. robustus	Brennan Basin Member	An ailuravine ischyromyid. Leptotomus kayi is a synonym of this species.	
Pareumys	P. guensbergi	Dry Gulch Creek Member, Lapoint Member	A cylindrodontid	
Pareumys	P. sp. aff. P. milleri	Brennan Basin Member	A cylindrodontid	
Paradjidaumo	P. sp.	Dry Gulch Creek Member	An eomyid	
Passaliscomys	P. sp.	Dry Gulch Creek Member	A heliscomyid	
Protadjidaumo	P. sp. cf. P. typus	Dry Gulch Creek Member	An eomyid	
Protadjidaumo	P. typus	Dry Gulch Creek Member, Lapoint Member	An eomyid	
Simiacritomys	S. sp.	Dry Gulch Creek Member	An eomyid	

=== Reptilia ===
Reptiles of the Duchesne River Formation
Genus / Taxon	Species	Member	Notes	Images
"Crocodylus"	"C." acer	Brennan Basin Member	A crocodyloid	
Cymatholcus	C. longus	"Halfway"	A tortoise	

== See also ==
- List of fossiliferous stratigraphic units in Utah
- Paleontology in Utah
