= Toromeryx =

Toromeryx Temporal range: Middle Eocene

Scientific classification
- Kingdom: Animalia
- Phylum: Chordata
- Class: Mammalia
- Order: Artiodactyla
- Family: †Protoceratidae
- Genus: †Toromeryx; Wilson (1974)

Species
- T. marginensis
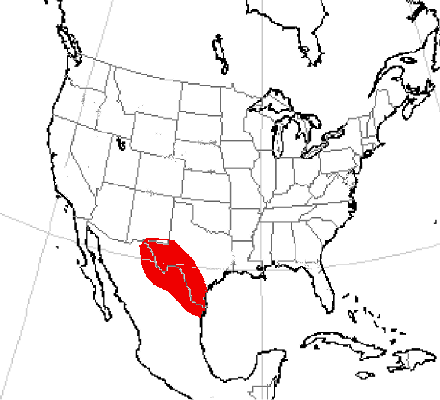
- Range of Toromeryx based on fossil record

Extinct genus of mammals

Toromeryx is a medium-sized extinct genus of artiodactyl, of the family Protoceratidae, endemic to southwestern North America during the Late Uintan stage (46.2—42 Ma) of the Eocene epoch, existing for approximately 4.2 million years.

== Taxonomy ==
Toromeryx was named by Wilson (1974). Its type is Toromeryx marginensis. It was assigned to Protoceratidae by Wilson (1974), Carroll (1988), Prothero (1998) and Prothero and Ludtke (2007).

== Morphology ==
Toromeryx resembled deer. However they were more closely related to camelids. In addition to having horns in the more usual place, protoceratids had additional, rostral horns above the orbital cavity. Toromeryx was smaller than Miocene members of Tylopoda: Paratoceras, Protoceras, and Pseudoprotoceras.

== Fossil distribution ==
Fossils have been recovered from:

- Candelaria TxVP 31281 Colmena Tuff Formation, Presidio County, Texas
- Casa Blanca Site, Laredo Formation, Webb County, Texas
