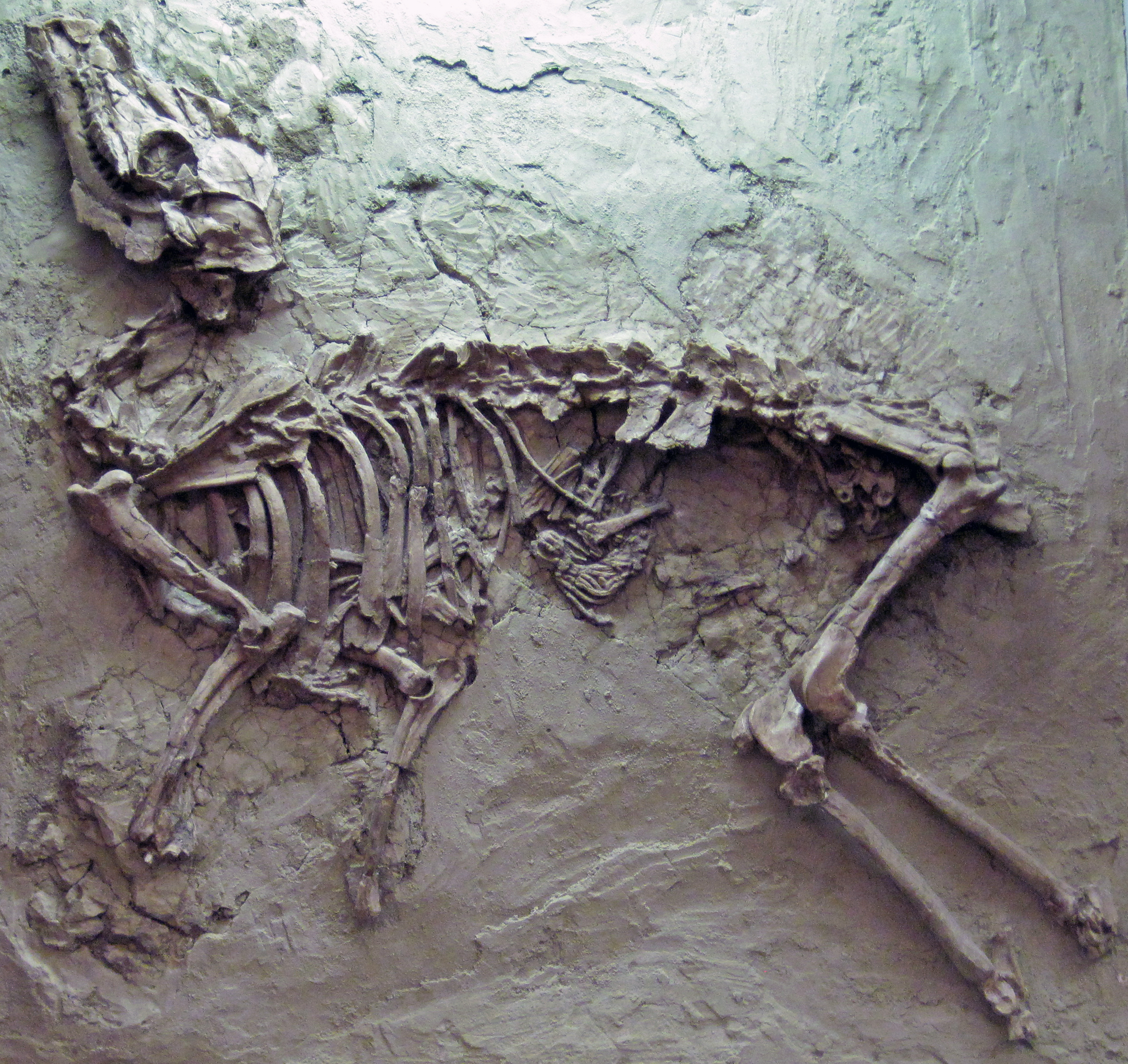
- Skeleton

Scientific classification
- Kingdom: Animalia
- Phylum: Chordata
- Class: Mammalia
- Order: Artiodactyla
- Family: †Protoceratidae
- Genus: †Pseudoprotoceras; Cook 1934

Type species
- †Pseudoprotoceras longinaris

Species
- P. longinaris Cook 1934; P. minor Wilson 1974; P. taylori Emry & Storer 1981

= Pseudoprotoceras =

Pseudoprotoceras Temporal range: Late Eocene

Extinct genus of mammals

Pseudoprotoceras is an extinct genus of Artiodactyla, of the family Protoceratidae, endemic to central North America. It lived during the Late Eocene 37.2—33.9 Ma, existing for approximately 3 million years. Pseudoprotoceras resembled hornless deer, but were more closely related to camelids.

Body mass was similar to other Eocene protoceratids such as Heteromeryx and Poabromylus yet greater than Leptotragulus and Leptoreodon. Miocene members were apparently larger as well.
