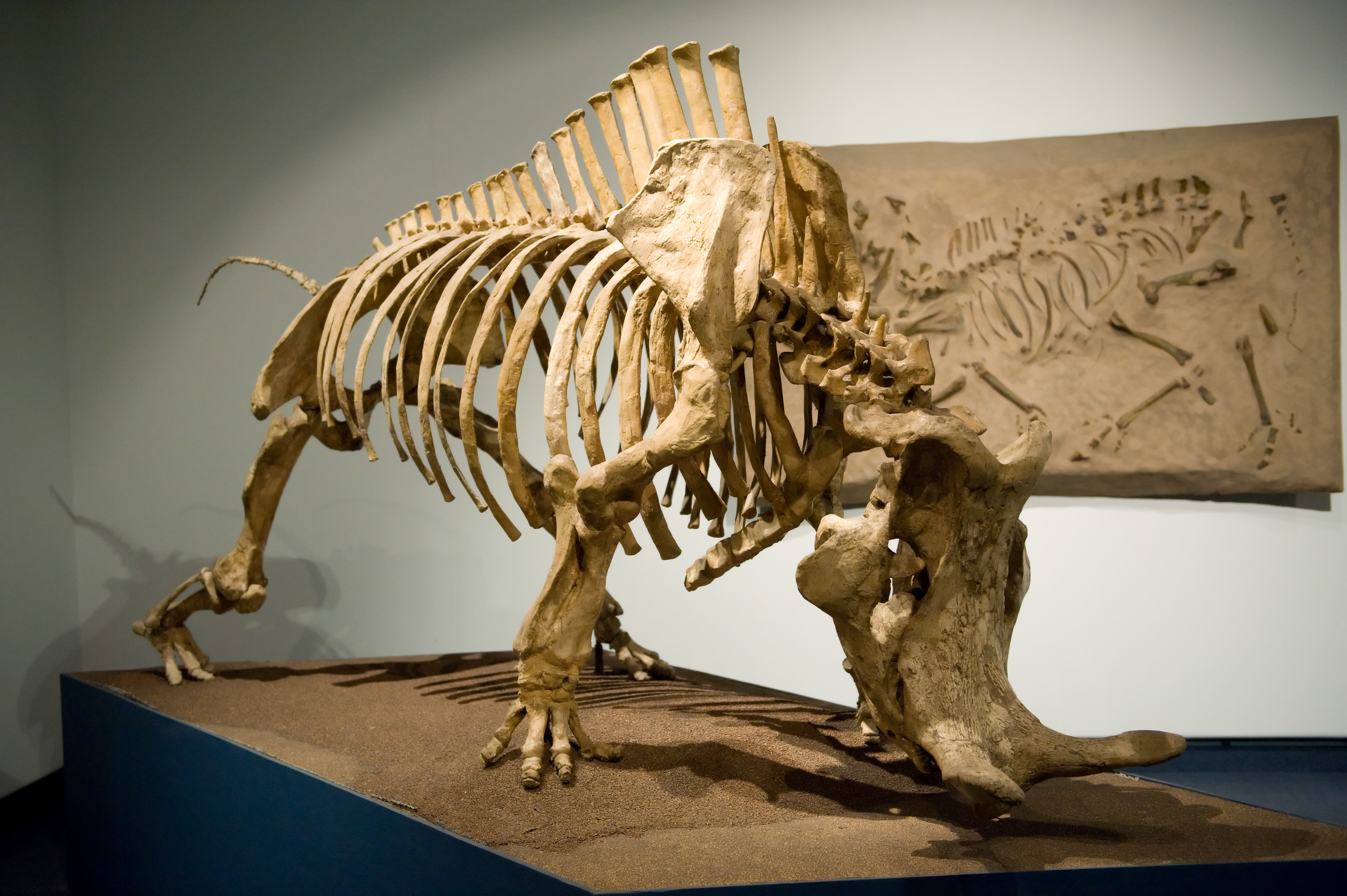
- Mounted skeleton of M. coloradensis, Natural History Museum of Los Angeles County

Scientific classification
- Kingdom: Animalia
- Phylum: Chordata
- Class: Mammalia
- Order: Perissodactyla
- Family: †Brontotheriidae
- Subfamily: †Brontotheriinae
- Tribe: †Brontotheriini
- Subtribe: †Brontotheriina
- Infratribe: †Brontotheriita
- Genus: †Megacerops; Leidy, 1870

Type species
- †Megacerops coloradensis Leidy, 1870

Other species
- †M. kuwagatarhinus Mader & Alexander, 1995

Synonyms
- Genus synonymy: Allops Marsh, 1887; Ateleodon Schlaikjer, 1935; Brontotherium Marsh, 1873; Brontops Marsh, 1887; Diconodon Marsh, 1876; Diploclonus Marsh, 1890; Eotherium Leidy, 1853; Haplacodon Cope, 1889; Leidyotherium Prout 1860; Megaceratops Cope, 1873; Menodus Pomel, 1849; Menops Marsh, 1887; Miobasileus Cope, 1873 (nomen nudum); Symborodon Cope, 1873; Teleodus Marsh, 1890; Titanops Marsh, 1887; Titanotherium Leidy, 1852; Species-level synonymy: See taxonomy of Megacerops

= Megacerops =

Megacerops Temporal range: Late Eocene (Chadronian), 37–33.7 Ma

Extinct genus of mammals

Megacerops (lit. 'great horned face' (Note: From Ancient Greek μέγας (méga, "great"), κέρας (kéras, "horn"), and ὤψ (ōps, "face").)) is an extinct genus of horned brontothere that lived in North America during the Late Eocene, (Note: The Chadronian was formerly correlated to the Oligocene, and Megacerops has thus historically often been treated as an Oligocene animal. Since the 1990s, new research has instead correlated the Chadronian to the Eocene, and there is no longer any support for large brontotheres in the Oligocene.) in the Chadronian land mammal age. Megacerops is among the best represented large mammals in the fossil record, known from hundreds of complete skulls and several complete skeletons. As the classic brontothere, Megacerops has enjoyed enduring fame in popular culture, often under various historically used names, such as Brontotherium, Brontops, and Titanotherium.

Megacerops was superficially similar to modern rhinoceroses, but closer to elephants in size. The largest known Megacerops may have been over 2.5 meters (8 ft 2 in) tall at the shoulder and could have weighed up to four or five tonnes. They were among the largest mammals in the Eocene, rivaled only by other brontotheres, and were by far the largest animals in their environment. Adult Megacerops were likely too large to be preyed upon by any contemporary predator.

The horns of Megacerops, its signature feature, were anatomically similar to the ossicones of modern giraffes and are believed to have been used in intraspecific combat. In some cases, Megacerops fossils have been found in mass death assemblages, which suggests that they were social animals that may have traveled herds. Paleoclimatological models of the Eocene and isotope analyses of Megacerops teeth suggest that they lived in warm temperate to subtropical forests and woodlands, and preferred moist environments.

Skulls of Megacerops are highly variable in some features, especially the size and shape of the horns. This was once interpreted as indicating different species and even genera, and has made the taxonomic history of Megacerops highly complex; over fifty species of Chadronian brontotheres have been named historically. The taxonomy is not entirely resolved. Today, variations among the fossils are interpreted largely as the result of sexual dimorphism and other individual variation. The genus contains at least one diagnosable species, the type species M. coloradensis. A rarer second species is also generally recognized, M. kuwagatarhinus, distinguished from M. coloradensis by its bifurcating horns.

== Research history ==
=== Early discoveries ===
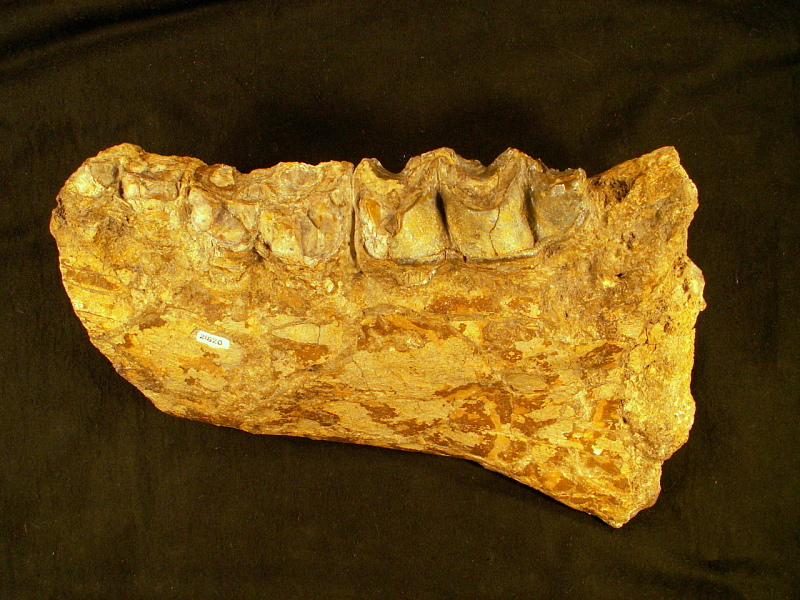
The holotype specimen of Menodus giganteus (USNM 21820), the first scientifically published brontothere fossil

Fossils of Megacerops were among the first mammal fossils from the American West to be brought to scientific attention. Long before the time of scientific inquiry into the fossils, Megacerops remains were sometimes exposed by severe rainstorms and found by Native Americans of the Lakota Sioux and Pawnee peoples. The Lakota linked the great mammals to their legends of wakíŋyaŋ, translated as "thunder beasts".

The first brontothere fossil to be scientifically described was a fragment of a right jaw (USNM 21820), found in the White River badlands of South Dakota. The fossil was described by Hiram A. Prout in 1847. Prout correctly identified the fossil as belonging to a large perissodactyl but believed that it was the jaw of a "giant Palaeotherium" (an extinct equoid). The publication of Prout's jaw captured the attention of the nascent paleontological community in the United States and set into motion the first wave of a "fossil rush" in the western parts of the country. In 1849, Auguste Pomel concluded that Prout's fossil did not belong to Palaeotherium and instead designated it as the type specimen of a new genus and species, Menodus giganteus. In 1850, David Dale Owen, Joseph Granville Norwood, and John Evans recorded additional brontothere teeth and jaws, collected by Evans. Owen and colleagues believed these fossils represented the same species as Prout's jaw. Apparently ignoring Pomel's name, Owen and colleagues named the new species Palaeotherium? proutii.

The fossils collected by Evans were soon acquired by Joseph Leidy, who examined and described the material in greater detail in 1852 and 1853. Leidy suspected that the animal was not an equoid, and suggested the name Titanotherium, "as expressive of its very great size". Leidy used the name Titanotherium proutii for all of the fossils, including Prout's jaw. Although recognized as the remains of large perissodactyls, early descriptions of brontothere fossils up to and including Leidy's work failed to recognize the distinctive nature of the animals.

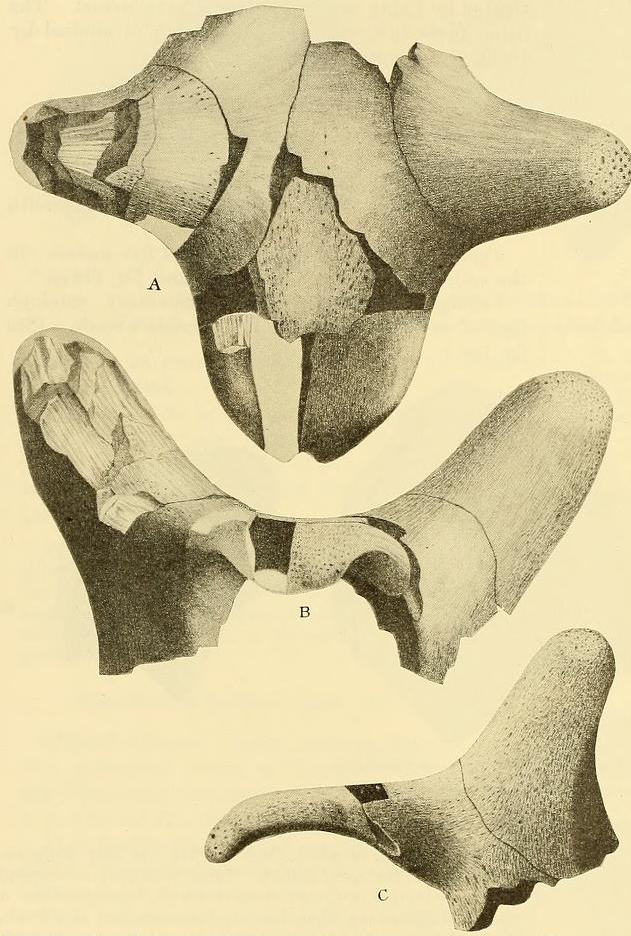
M. coloradensis type specimen (ANSP 13362)

In 1870, Leidy described the first known brontothere fossil to preserve most of the distinctive horns (ANSP 13362), found in Colorado. Leidy suspected that ANSP 13362 could represent the same animal as Titanotherium, but struggled with identifying the fossil, speculating that it could perhaps represent a camelid or a North American representative of the giraffid Sivatherium. Leidy provisionally referred the fossil to a new genus and species, Megacerops coloradensis.

In the 1870s and 1880s, the northern Great Plains saw intense paleontological excavations due to the Bone Wars, a period of competitive fossil hunting between the rival researchers Othniel Charles Marsh and Edward Drinker Cope. Both Marsh and Cope funded expeditions to uncover and describe new prehistoric mammals in the region. In the 1870s, Marsh and Cope described several dinoceratans, an extinct order of large mammals, some of which had horns similar to Megacerops, such as Uintatherium and Eobasileus. In 1873, Leidy speculated that Megacerops could belong to the same order as these animals. Leidy also alternatively suggested that Megacerops could have been a proboscid, the nasal bones perhaps having served as attachment points for a tapir-like movable snout or a proboscis.

=== Further findings ===
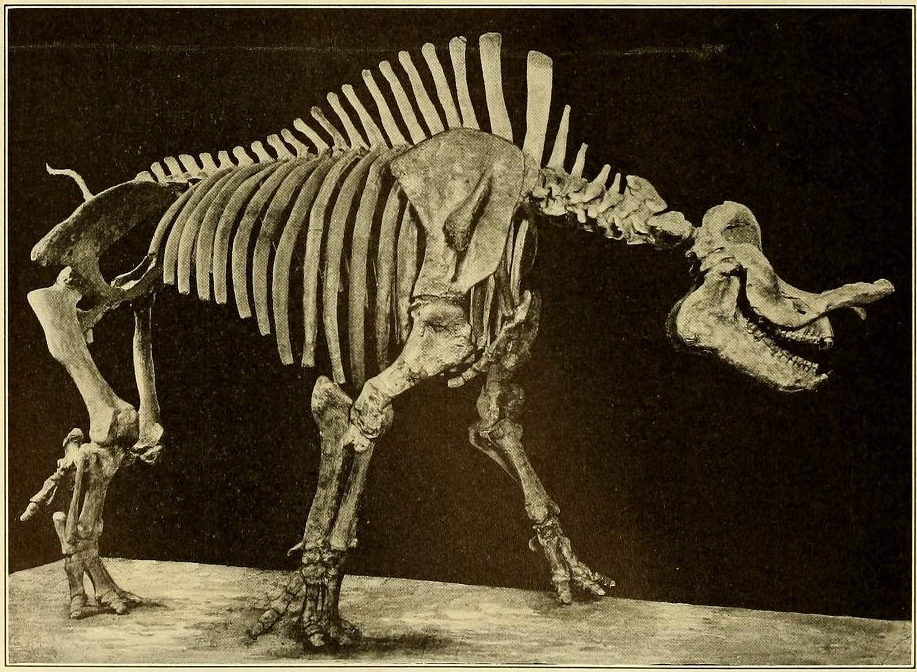
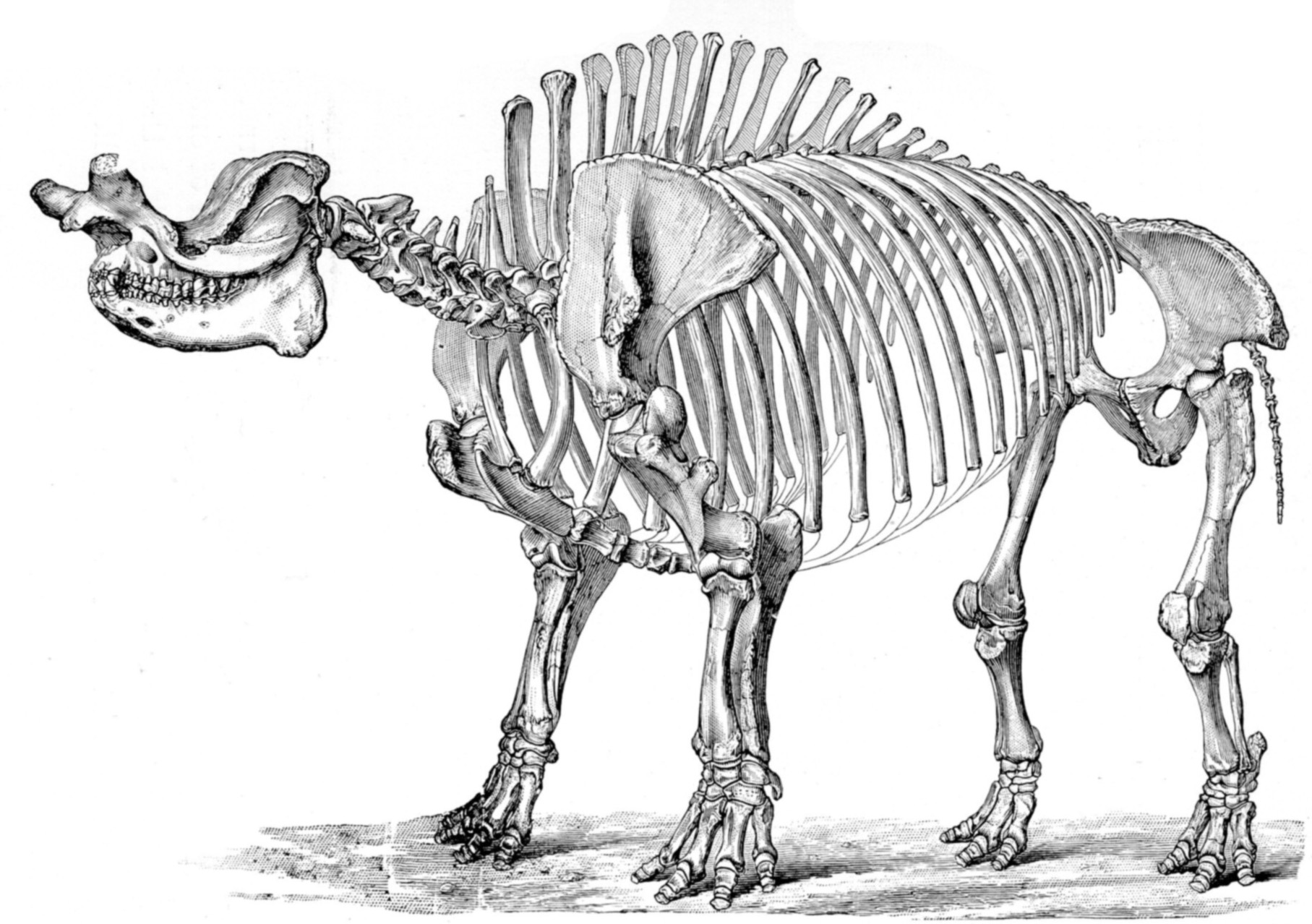
YPM VP 12048, a nearly complete skeleton made the type specimen of Brontops robustus by Othniel Charles Marsh (top) and an illustration of the same skeleton by F. Berger, done under Marsh's direction in 1889 (bottom)

Othniel Charles Marsh's contributions to brontothere research were highly significant. His studies of brontotheres began in 1870, when he led an expedition to northern Colorado on behalf of Yale College. This expedition collected a large number of brontothere fossils, including well-preserved and complete skulls and postcranial elements. During the expedition, Marsh's crew were shown a brontothere jaw by a group of Lakota, who told them of their legends of wakíŋyaŋ. In honor of the legends, Marsh named the new genus Brontotherium ("thunder beast") in 1873.

Marsh's 1873 description of Brontotherium gigas was the most important contribution to brontothere knowledge up until that time. The holotype was designated as another lower jaw, but Marsh was able to correctly describe several characters of both the jaws and the rest of the skeleton. Marsh recognized Brontotherium as a "true perissodactyl with limb bones resembling those of Rhinoceros". Recognizing that Brontotherium was related to the animal described as Titanotherium by Leidy, Marsh also erected the new family Brontotheriidae to contain the two genera. In 1875, H. C. Clifford discovered and excavated a large and nearly complete brontothere skeleton near Chadron, Nebraska. This skeleton (YPM VP 12048) was described by Marsh in 1887 as the type specimen of the new genus and species Brontops robustus.

Marsh continued to study brontothere fossils for the rest of his career, some collected by himself but most purchased from collectors "out West". Both Marsh and Cope named new species for close to every good brontothere specimen that came into their possession, often differentiated only by minor features. The first fossils from outside of the United States were reported by Cope in 1886, from the Swift Current Creek in Assiniboia (today Saskatchewan), Canada. Cope named the new species Menodus angustigenis to accommodate these fossils.

In cooperation with the United States Geological Survey, Marsh wrote a series of monographs on prehistoric animals from the United States. Paleontological field work was carried out at an unprecedented scale by the U.S. Geological Survey to gather material for Marsh's monographs on both ceratopsian dinosaurs and brontotheres. Brontothere fossils were collected for the monograph in large part by John Bell Hatcher, who spent fifteen months in South Dakota and Nebraska in 1886–1888. By the end of his expedition, Hatcher reported that he had collected "nearly 200 complete skulls and many more or less complete skeletons". Marsh's brontothere monograph was not completed before his death in 1899, and he left no known manuscript for it, only pencil notes and unpublished figures.

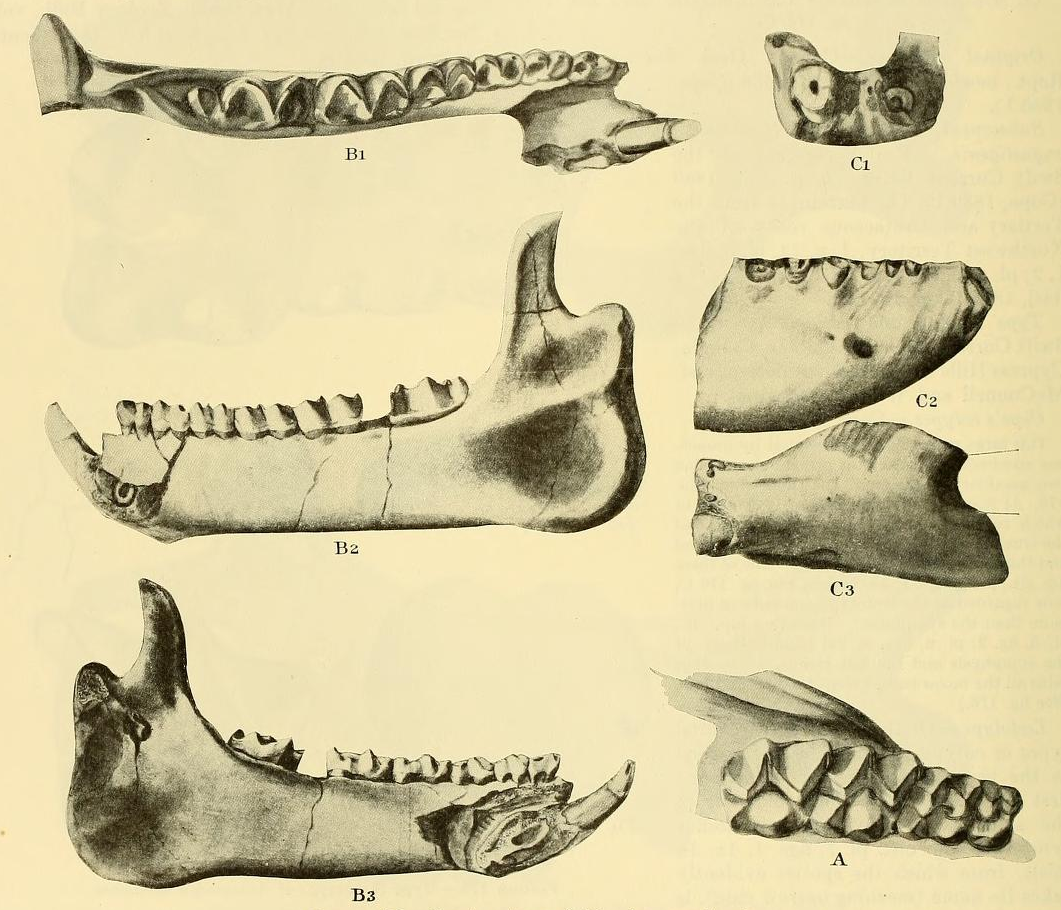
Fossils referred to Menodus angustigenis by Edward Drinker Cope, the first Megacerops fossils reported from Canada

In the late 19th and early 20th century, most of the museums in the United States funded fossil collecting in the so-called "Titanotherium beds" of the Great Plains, increasing the already large brontothere fossil sample to encompass further skeletons and many additional skulls. Henry Fairfield Osborn energetically pursued further studies of brontothere fossils, making the study of the group one of his life's quests. Most of the fossils worked on by Osborn were collected by Hatcher and originally intended to serve as material for Marsh's monograph. In 1929, Osborn published a monograph on the brontotheres, The Titanotheres of Ancient Wyoming, Dakota, and Nebraska. The two-volume monograph spanned 951 pages and was illustrated with 795 figures and 236 plates. Osborn believed that it would be the definitive work on brontotheres.

The large number of fossils collected has made Megacerops one of the best represented large herbivores in the fossil record of North American mammals. Megacerops fossils have predominantly been recovered from the White River Group in the United States and the Cypress Hills Formation in Canada. All fossils now attributed to Megacerops appear to be restricted to the Chadronian land mammal age, which corresponds to the Late Eocene. Despite the large number of specimens, the evolution and paleobiology of Megacerops remain understudied, largely due to longstanding taxonomic confusion obstructing further research. An additional problem is that most Megacerops fossils have poorly recorded stratigraphic data, which has limited the degree to which variation in single contemporary populations can be studied.

=== Taxonomy and species ===
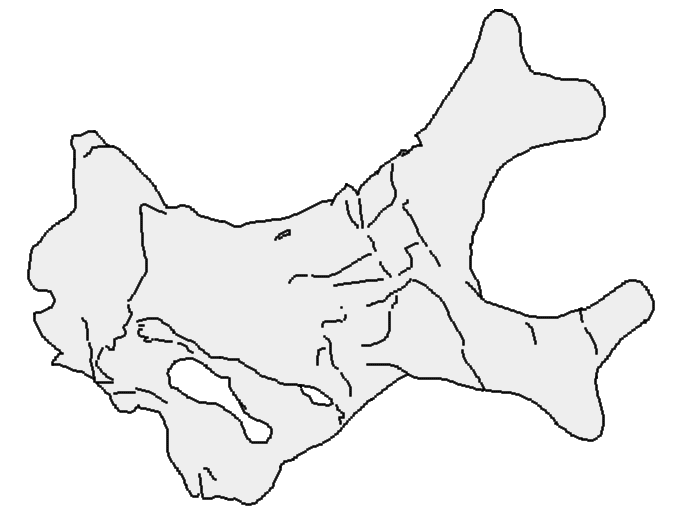
Illustration of F:AM 128600, the holotype specimen of M. kuwagatarhinus

By the time of Osborn's 1929 monograph, at least 47 species of Chadronian brontotheres had been named, many based on poor and fragmentary fossils. Fossils are very similar in most of the features of the skeletons. Clear differences are for the most part only found in the shape, orientation, and size of the horns, the prominence of the nasal bones, and the thickness of the zygomatic arches. Because of this, there was a general consensus in the 20th century that the brontotheres were highly oversplit, i.e. divided into far too many species. In his monograph, Osborn recognized 37 valid species of Chadronian brontotheres; this number was criticized even by Osborn's contemporaries as far too high for the relatively brief timeframe of the Chadronian. Osborn variously attributed the variation seen in the fossils to sexual dimorphism, ontogenetic differences, and to species-level differences, but did not show how a feature could be determined to vary due to one factor or another.

In 1967, John Clark, James R. Beerbower and Kenneth K. Kietzke were the first to suggest that all Chadronian brontotheres belonged to a single species that exhibited great individual variation. This was based on a fossil site that preserved several horn cores with variable morphology, from a group of contemporary individuals. Finding it unlikely that the horns were from four different species, Clark, Beerbower and Kietzke referred all four specimens to the single species Menodus giganteus, the oldest available name, and designated all other names, such as Brontotherium and Titanotherium, as junior synonyms. In 1989, Bryn J. Mader published a proposed revision of the Brontotheriidae. Mader recognized a number of Chadronian brontothere species as valid, divided into the three genera Menops, Brontops and Megacerops. Mader's classification was mostly based on the cross section shapes of horns. By this approach, the name Menodus giganteus is a nomen dubium since the holotype of that species contains no horn material and thus no diagnostic features.

In a 2004 preliminary revision, Matthew C. Mihlbachler, Spencer G. Lucas and Robert J. Emry concluded that the variability among Chadronian brontothere fossils is slightly higher than that of modern sexually dimorphic mammal species. Using data from a large number of skulls, it was found to be impossible to divide the fossils into discrete units (i.e. separate species), and that there thus might be just one diagnosable species in the fossil assemblage. Mihlbachler, Lucas, and Emry chose to recognize two species, with the second species distinguished by rare skulls with bifurcating horns. These fossils had been described as a new species by Mader and John P. Alexander in 1995, Megacerops kuwagatarhinus. Since distinctions between the two forms can only be seen in the horns, Mihlbachler, Lucas and Emry suggested that the name Megacerops coloradensis should be used for the common species with unbifurcating horns. M. coloradensis is the earliest available name with a holotype that preserves unbifurcating horns, and thus the earliest name to securely apply to this species. In a comprehensive 2008 phylogenetic analysis, Mihlbachler recovered Megacerops as a monophyletic genus, and noted that while the present data only supported two diagnosable species, more could perhaps be indicated in future studies on the Megacerops material.

A detailed species-level revision of Megacerops is still required to fully resolve the taxonomy. Despite the lack of a detailed revision, the status of Megacerops as the only valid Chadronian brontothere genus, containing only two species, has become widely accepted. Mihlbachler's conclusions have been supported by researchers such as Donald Prothero, Karen J. Lloyd, Jaelyn J. Eberle, Parker D. Rhinehart, Alfred J. Mead and Dennis Parmley. Mader rejected the single-genus model, and continued to regard Menops, Brontops and Megacerops to be distinct genera, with several species. In response, Mihlbachler pointed out that Mader had not done a species-level revision of these genera, had not shown them to be monophyletic via phylogenetic analysis, and that the diagnostic features proposed by Mader are continuous in the fossil material and can thus not indicate distinct taxa (i.e. the fossils do not cluster together in three clear genera, as proposed). Although historical generic names such as Titanotherium, Brontotherium and Brontops are generally not treated seriously by researchers today, these names continue to remain famous and appear in popular books, on websites, and as names for toys.

== Description ==
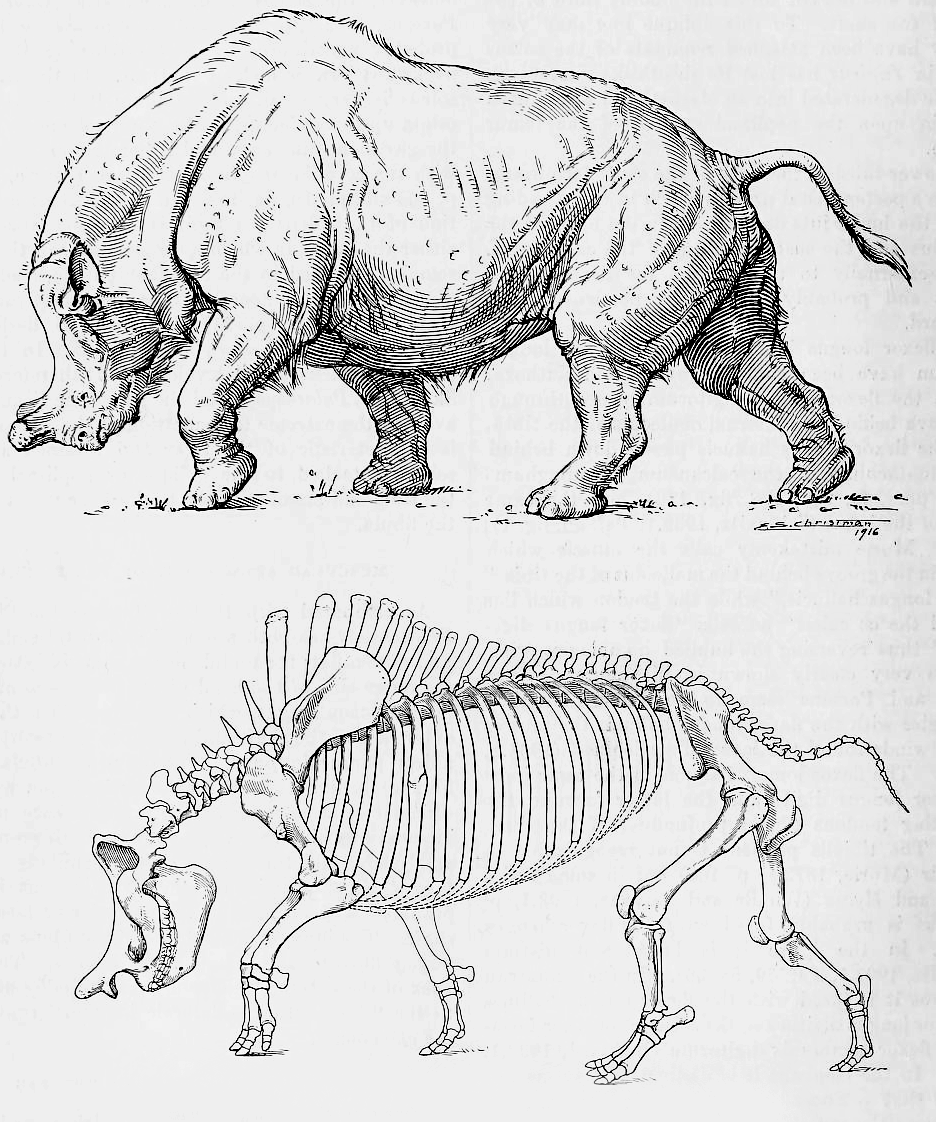
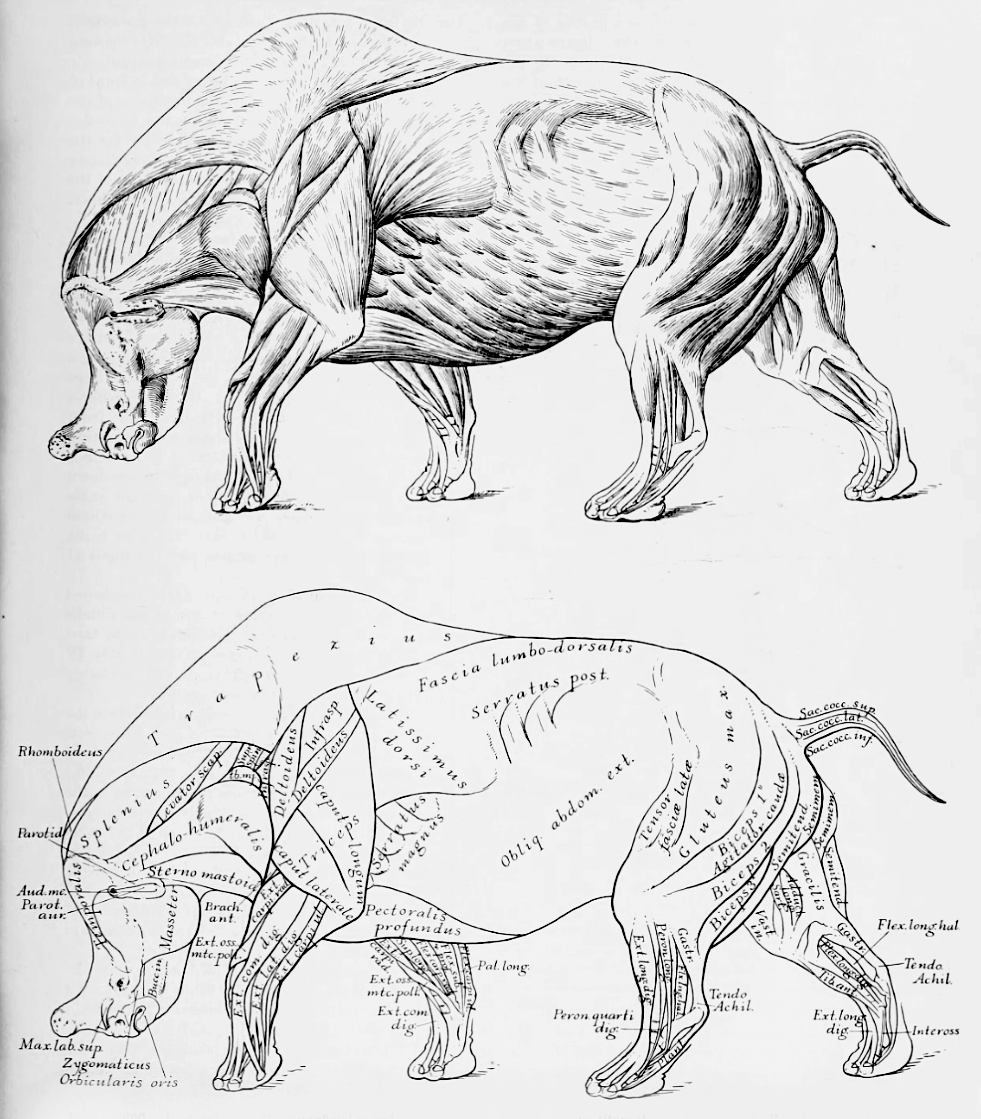
Reconstruction of the life appearance and musculature of Megacerops by Erwin S. Christman (1916)

Megacerops was a huge and impressive animal, characterized by its large size and the two horns at the front of its skull. They were massively built and robust, and adapted for strength rather than speed.

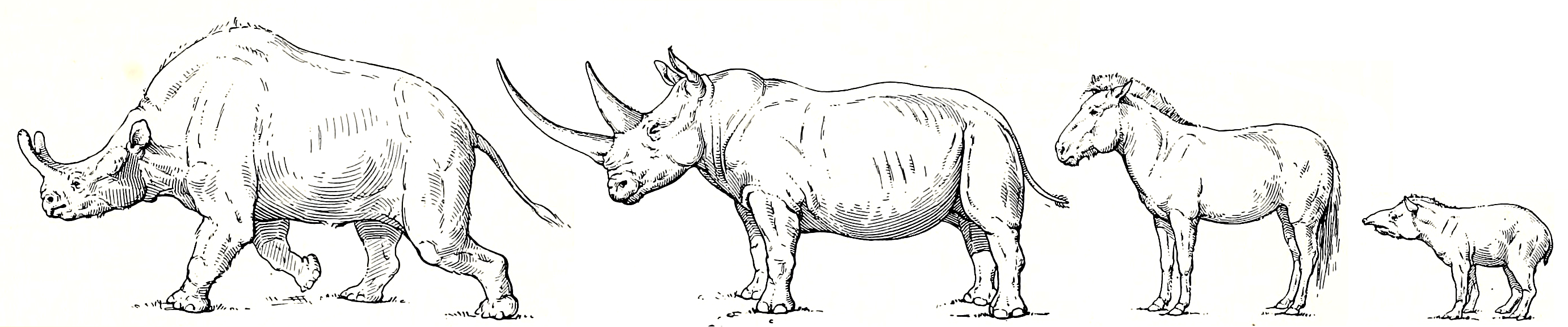
Megacerops compared to modern perissodactyls (white rhinoceros, Przewalski's horse, and the South American tapir)

Megacerops was superficially similar to modern rhinoceroses in appearance, an example of convergent evolution. Beyond the similarities, several features separate Megacerops and other brontotheres from rhinoceroses. Megacerops was a more robust animal in general. Megacerops had four toes on its manus (front feet) and three on its pes (hind feet), the primitive perissodactyl condition, whereas rhinoceroses have three toes on each. Megacerops has well-developed canines while the canines are typically lost in rhinoceroses, and molars more similar to those of chalicotheres than rhinoceroses. Rhinoceros horns are composed of agglutinated (tightly packed) keratin, whereas the horn cores of Megacerops were composed of bone.

=== Size ===
Megacerops was among the largest brontotheres, rivaled in size only by a handful of other genera, such as Embolotherium. The largest brontotheres were the largest mammals of the Eocene. Megacerops exceeded all modern rhinoceroses in size and was closer in size to elephants, only shorter. The largest Megacerops are typically estimated to have been 2.5 meters (8 ft 2 in) tall at the shoulder. This measurement derives in part from YPM VP 12048, the well-preserved skeleton once considered the type specimen of Brontops robustus. When first mounted in 1916, this specimen was measured at 2.502 meters (8 feet 2½ inches) tall at the shoulder and 4.635 meters (15 feet 2½ inches) long, including the tail. The largest Megacerops specimens have sometimes historically been estimated to have reached 3 meters (10 ft) tall at the shoulder. Large Megacerops would have reached about 5 meters (16 ft) in length.

Various weight estimates of Megacerops have been published, ranging from as low as 2–3 tonnes (2.2–3.3 short tons) to as high as 3.98 tonnes (4.39 short tons), 4.18 tonnes (4.61 short tons) or even 5 tonnes (5.5 short tons).

=== Skull ===
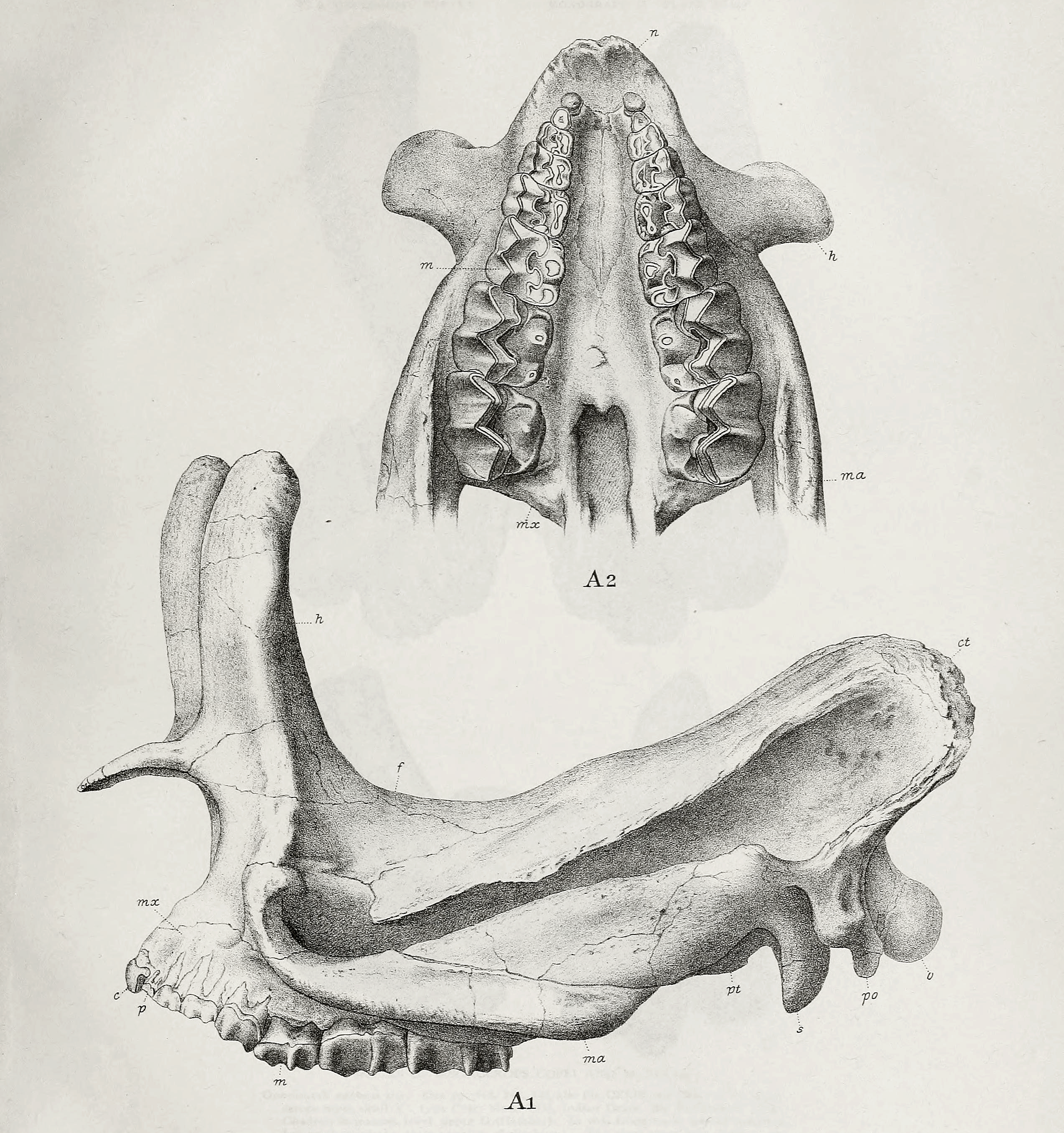
Illustration of a Megacerops skull, including the upper dentition

The skull of Megacerops was massive and somewhat rhinoceros-like. The skull was long and broad, and vaguely saddle-shaped. Several features of the skull were greatly developed, such as the nasal bones, which were coossified (grown together through ossification), and the zygomatic arches. The occiput (back of the skull) was very high and broad. Most of these developments appear to have been correlated with the development of the horns of Megacerops.

There is no consistent dental formula for the entire Megacerops fossil assemblage. Mammal teeth are highly diagnostic; differences in dentition has historically been used to justify dividing the fossils into multiple genera. In 1876, Marsh described the dental formula of "Brontotherium" as 2.1.4.32.1.3.3, (Note: The order of numbers represent types of teeth—incisors, canines, premolars, and molars—and the bar separates the dentition in the upper and lower jaws. 2.1.4.32.1.3.3 is read as two pairs of incisors in both the upper and lower jaw, one pair of canines in both the upper and lower jaw, four pairs of premolars in the upper jaw and three pairs of premolars in the lower jaw, and three pairs of molars in both the upper and lower jaw.) that of "Menodus" as 2.1.4.32.1.4?.3, that of Megacerops as 2.1.4.30.1.3.3, and that of "Diconodon" as 0.1.4.31.1.3.3. In 1889, Marsh's "Brontops" was described as distinct based on its dental formula, 2.1.4.31.1.4.3. The number of different teeth was evidently not an important diagnostic feature in brontotheres. Some Megacerops skulls for instance preserve three lower premolars on one side and four on the other, meaning that the number of this tooth cannot have been a feature that separated genera (as suggested by Marsh for "Brontotherium" and "Menodus").

Megacerops had at most two pairs of incisors. More basal brontotheres, such as Diplacodon and Protitanotherium, had additional pairs of incisors but experienced atrophy of some pairs and hypertrophy of others, perhaps a step towards the condition seen in Megacerops. Fossil evidence points to the incisors being of little use to Megacerops; they were reduced in size, fossils show very little wear, and Megacerops specimens of advanced age sometimes lost their incisors over the course of their lives. The lack of use for the incisors could suggest that brontotheres had a prehensile upper lip, similar to modern rhinoceroses.

=== Postcranial skeleton ===
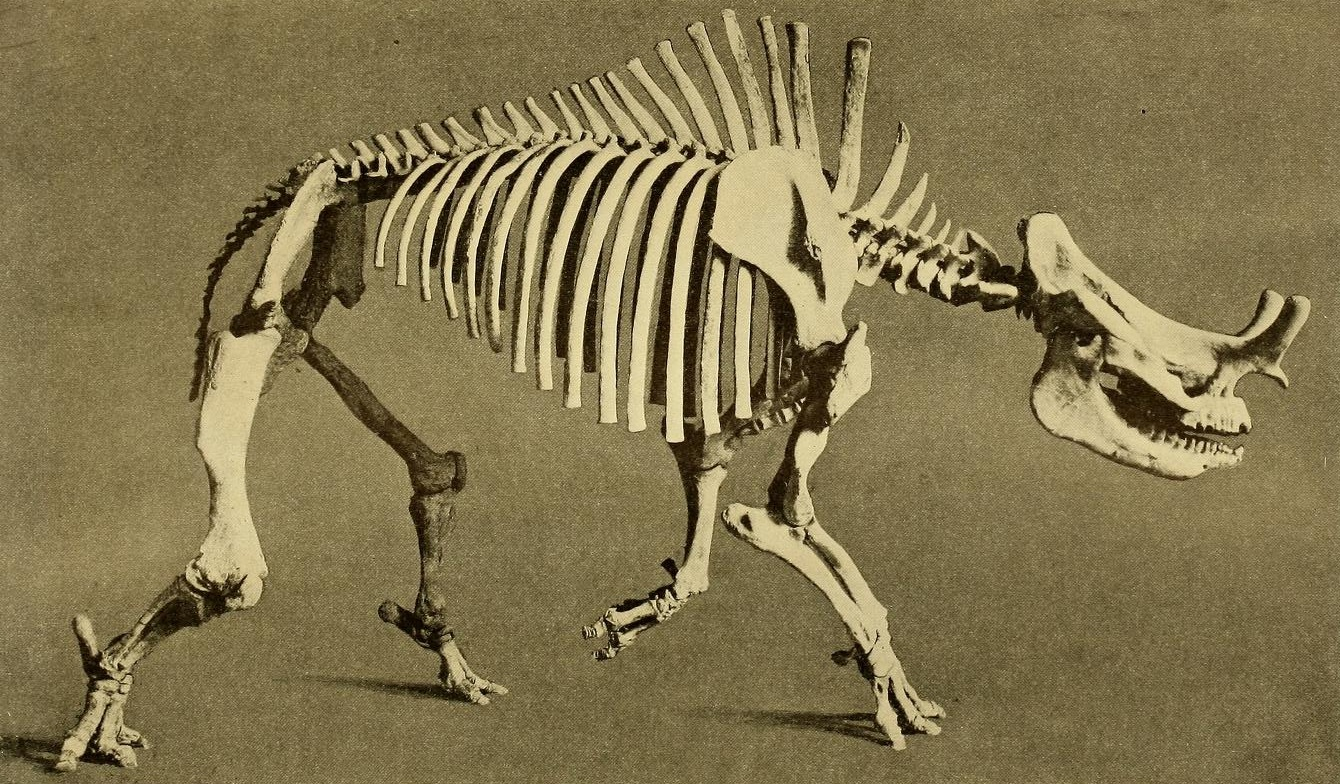
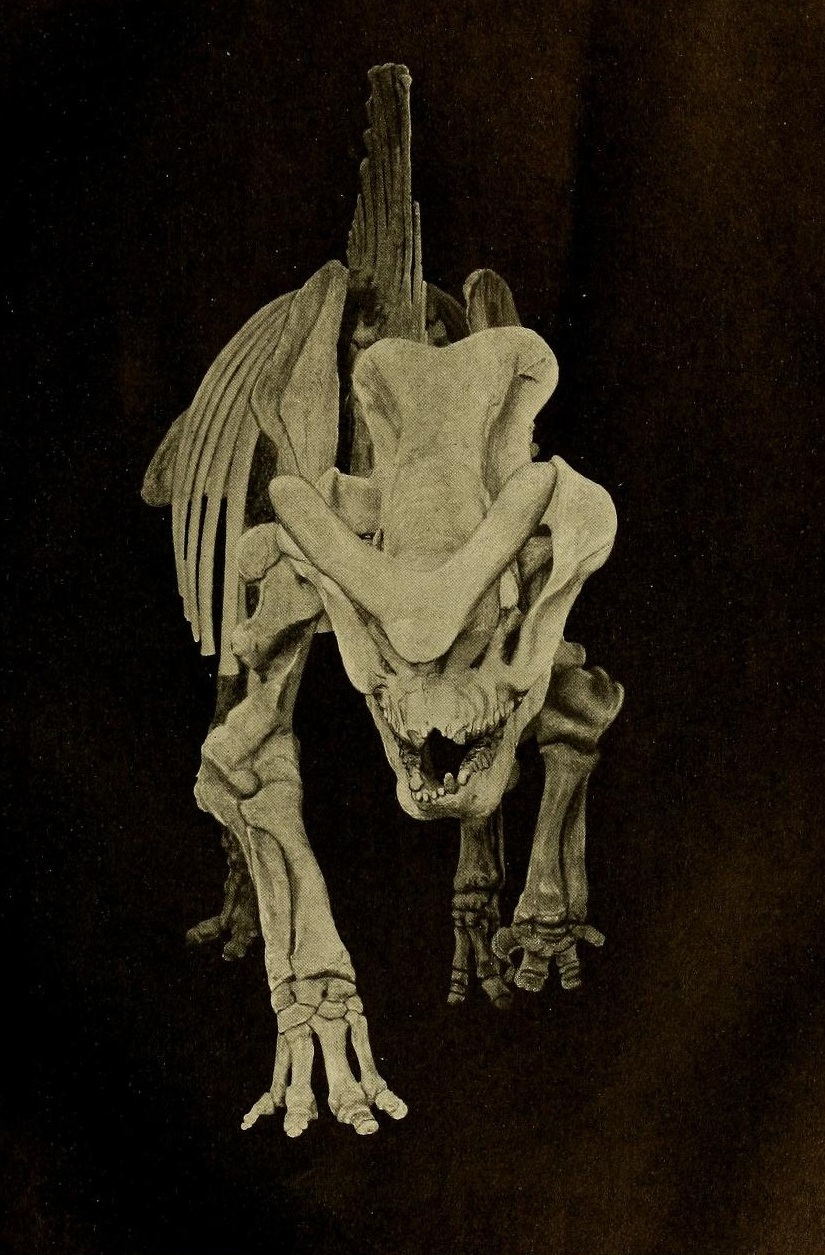
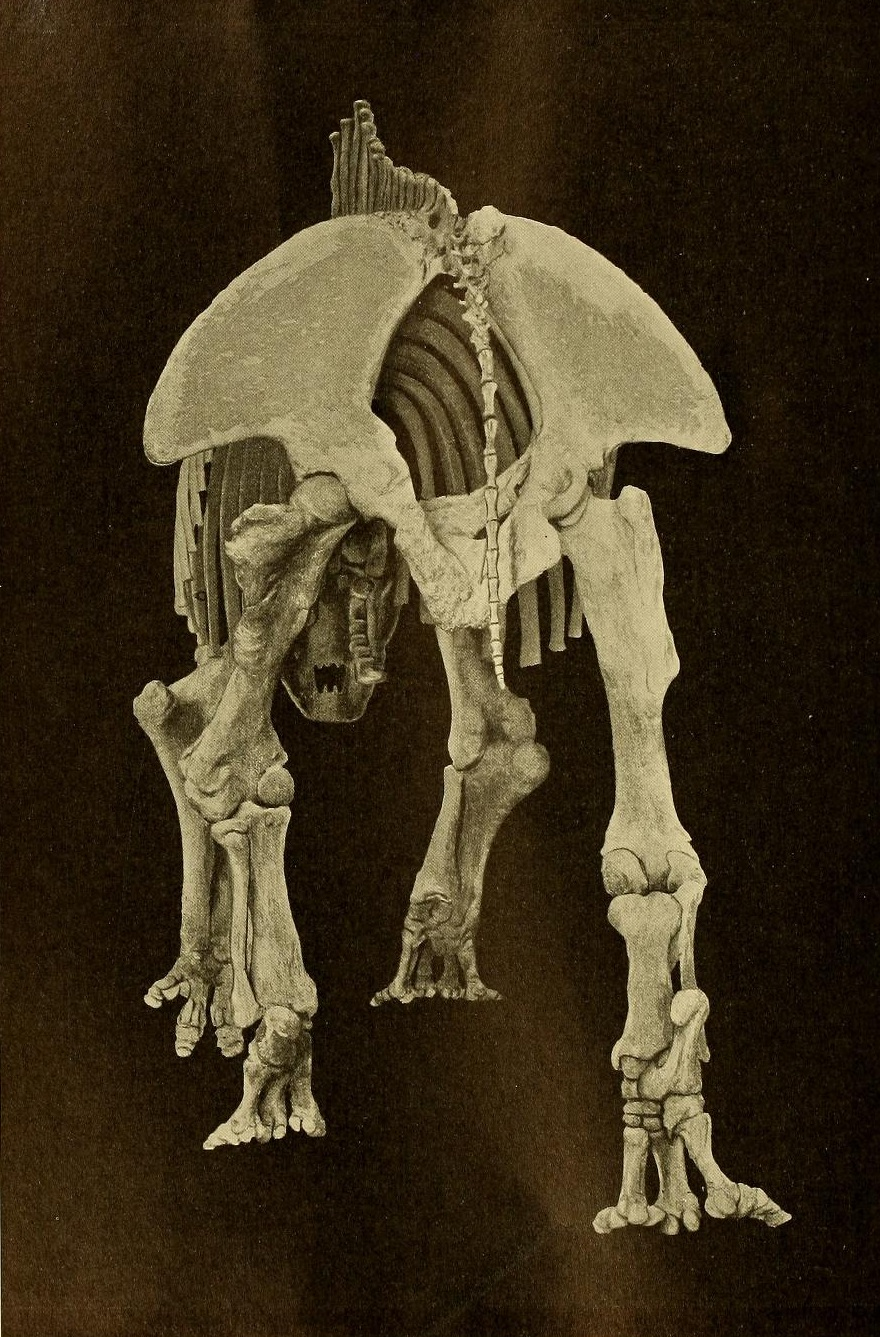
Side, front, and back views of a Megacerops skeleton

The postcranial skeleton of Megacerops was massive, robust, and relatively short. The most notable feature of the postcranial skeleton is the elongated spines of the dorsal vertebrae above the shoulders, an adaptation to support the huge neck muscles needed to carry the heavy skull. This aspect of Megacerops anatomy distinguishes it from both rhinoceroses and elephants, and has been compared to the vertebrae and neck musculature of modern bison. The neck itself was stout and moderately long. The vertebrae of Megacerops were somewhat similar to those of modern rhinoceroses. The ribs were strong and massive. The pelvis of Megacerops was expanded transversely and wide, similar to elephant pelvises.

The limbs of Megacerops were intermediate in proportion between those of modern rhinoceroses and elephants. The limbs of show several adaptations to withstand the great weight of the animal. Compared to rhinoceroses, Megacerops limbs are stouter, particularly at the ankles and wrists, and there is a lesser degree of angulations between the segments of the limbs. The forelimbs were especially robust and several adaptations, notably roughenings of the olecranon (the protruding part of the elbow) and the humerus, suggest great muscle power.

Megacerops had four toes on its manus (front feet) and three on its pes (hind feet). The retention of the fourth digit on the manus is probably another feature that helped to support the animal's great weight. The arrangement of their feet bones indicate that Megacerops feet had a pad of elastic tissue, similar to the feet of modern elephants and rhinoceroses.

== Classification ==
=== Evolution and relations ===
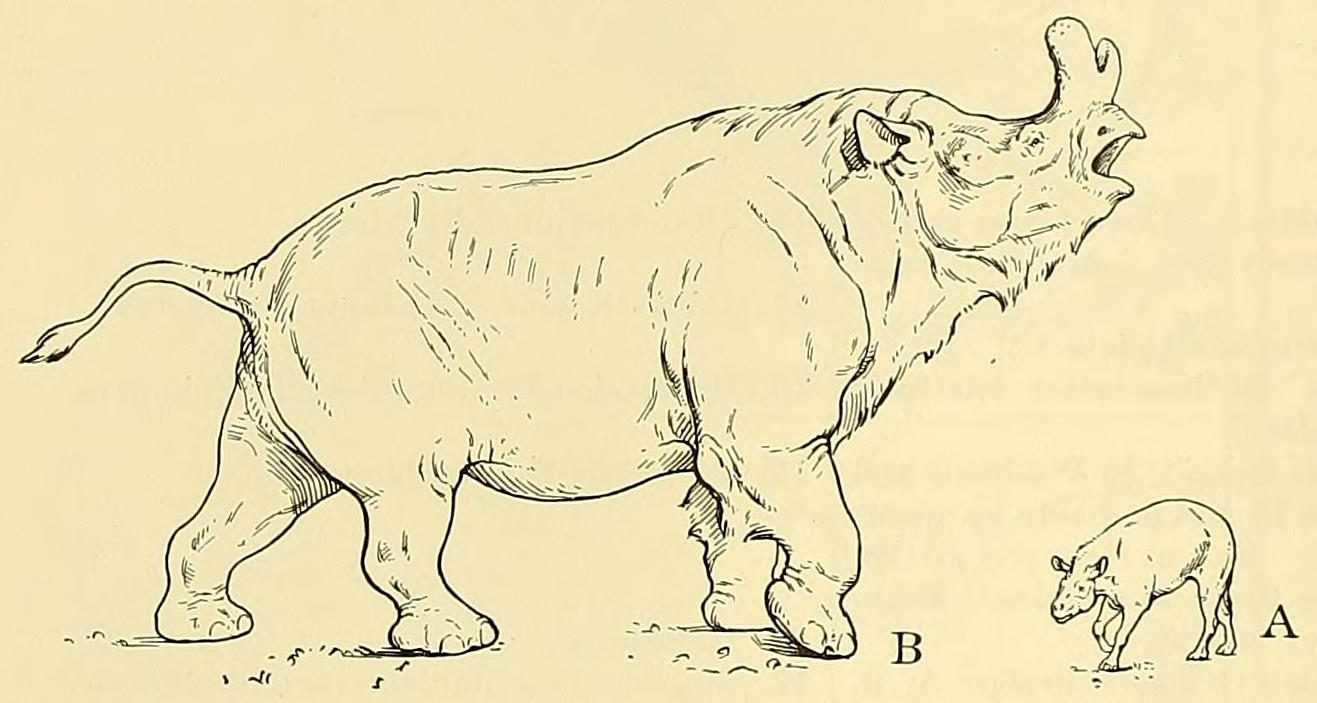
Megacerops (B) and the basal brontothere Eotitanops (A), drawn to scale

Brontotheres composed the family Brontotheriidae, of which Megacerops was a derived member. The brontotheres are classified in the order Perissodactyla (odd-toed ungulates), the group that includes modern horses, rhinoceroses, and tapirs. Brontotheres are traditionally classified as close relatives of horses, but their position in the perissodactyl family tree is currently contentious and results vary between studies.

Phylogenetic analyses indicate that horned brontotheres (the subtribe Brontotheriina) originated in Asia. Horned brontotheres first appeared in North America during the Uintan land mammal age, diversifying into several species and genera, out of which Diplacodon is the best represented in the fossil record. Early North American horned brontotheres were ancestral to the more derived infratribe Brontotheriita, which includes Megacerops. It is not clear where exactly the Brontotheriita originated since basal members of the infratribe are known from both North America (Protitanops, Eubrontotherium) and Asia (Parabrontops). It is possible that the ancestors and close relatives of Megacerops migrated in and out of Asia more than once.

=== Systematics ===
The family Brontotheriidae was created by Marsh in 1873 to contain the horned brontotheres known at the time, Titanotherium and Brontotherium (both genera now considered synonyms of Megacerops). Serious attempts to classify the large number of American brontothere fossils were undertaken by Osborn in the early 20th century. In his 1929 monograph, Osborn divided the Brontotheriidae into a number of different subfamilies, which he believed represented several polyphyletic and separately evolving lineages. Osborn's taxonomy had major shortcomings, notably oversplitting of the fossils and the influence of Osborn's personal belief in the obsolete hypothesis of orthogenesis. Despite criticism, Osborn's taxonomy was mostly retained throughout the 20th century, though the subfamilies used could vary between studies. Detailed revisions to brontothere taxonomy were not published until work by Mader in the 1980s and 1990s, and Mihlbachler in the 2000s.

Per Mihlbachler's 2008 revision, Megacerops is classified as part of the infratribe Brontotheriita. This group also includes the genera Dianotitan, Duchesneodus, Eubrontotherium, Notiotitanops, Parabrontops, Parvicornus, and Protitanops. The Brontotheriita were a sister group to the infratribe Embolotheriita, which includes genera such as Embolotherium, Metatitan and Gnathotitan.

The cladograms below are the reduced strict consensus tree of brontotheres from Mihlbachler's 2008 analysis (collapsed to show only the Brontotheriita), and the reduced strict consensus tree for the Brontotheriita from a 2021 study by Mihlbachler and Prothero on brontotheres from Texas.

Mihlbachler, 2008

- Brontotheriita
  - Parabrontops gobiensis
  - Protitanops curryi
  - - Eubrontotherium clarnoensis
    - - Dianotitan lunanensis
      - Duchesneodus uintensis
      - - Megacerops coloradensis
        - Megacerops kuwagatarhinus

Mihlbachler & Prothero, 2021

- Brontotheriita
  - Parabrontops gobiensis
  - - Parvicornus occidentalis
    - - Eubrontotherium clarnoensis
      - - Protitanops curryi
        - - Dianotitan lunanensis
          - - Duchesneodus uintensis
            - - Megacerops kuwagatarhinus
              - Megacerops coloradensis

== Paleobiology ==
=== Horns ===
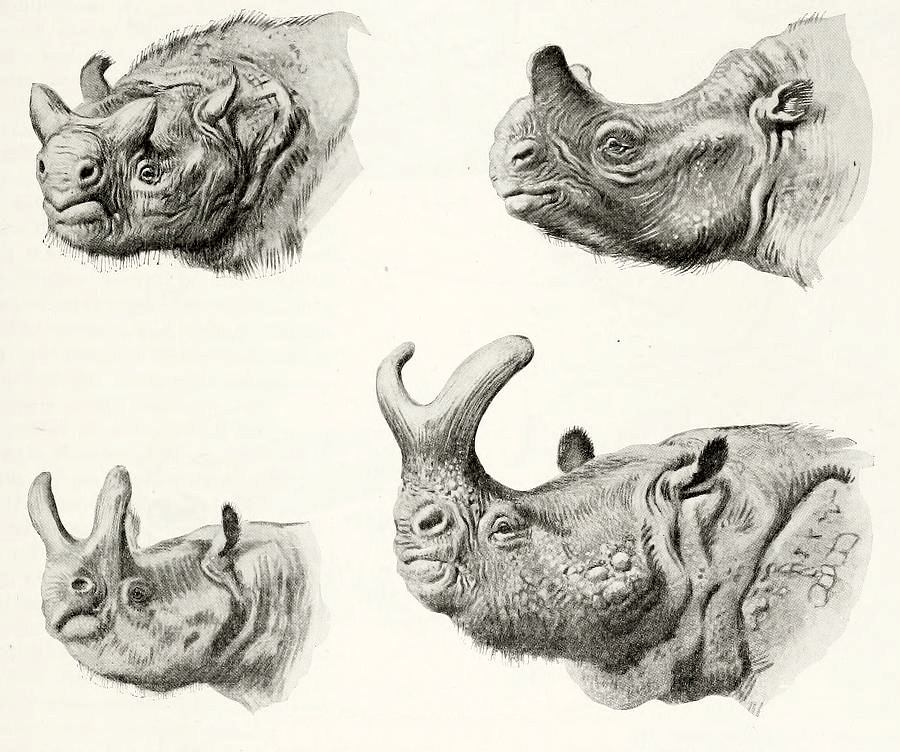
Four M. coloradensis heads restored by Charles R. Knight (1929), showing the variability in horn morphology

Many brontothere genera had horns or cranial domes. The horns of Megacerops were the most developed out of all North American brontotheres. The horns took the form of two bony protuberances above the nose, and were vaguely reminiscent of a slingshot in shape. The horns were the dominant feature of the skull. The shape, size and orientation of Megacerops horns varied greatly between individuals, as did the degree to which the horns impacted the rest of the cranial anatomy. Smaller Megacerops with smaller horns had a typical and well-developed nasal process. In larger Megacerops with larger horns, the nasal process was largely absorbed by the horns and reduced to a small triangle-shaped remnant structure. In some rare specimens, the two horns have fused together completely to produce a plate or shield-like structure extending across the entire muzzle.

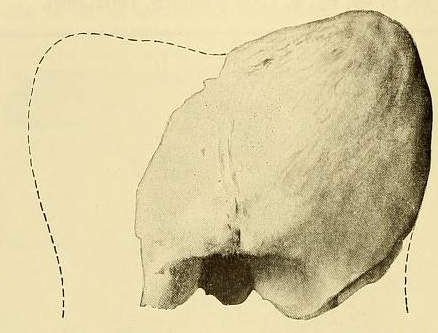
Rare Megacerops specimen with the two horns fused into a shield-like structure

The great variability in horn shape in Megacerops could have been caused by a relatively indeterminate system controlling horn growth, in which minor genetic differences of "accidents of development" could give rise to great variations in shape, size, and orientation. Based on patterns of sexual dimorphism in living horned mammals, larger Megacerops with larger and more elaborate horns are traditionally assumed to have been male specimens.

Megacerops horns were composed of non-deciduous bone and not elaborated with any additional bone structures or ornamentation. There were large air cavities in the base of the horns. Among modern mammals, the anatomical structure that most closely resembles brontothere horns are the ossicones of giraffes.

The life appearance of Megacerops horns is unknown. The horns have historically been described as analogous to the horns of deer and bovines and traditional reconstructions often depict them as sheathed in keratinous horns. Such reconstructions probably do not reflect the actual appearance of the animal; it is unlikely that the horns of Megacerops were sheathed in keratin since they lack the vascular impressions seen in horn cores of animals such as cows and ceratopsian dinosaurs. Similar to giraffe ossicones, brontothere horns were most likely instead entirely covered in skin. The skin on the horns may have been keratinized, but there is no evidence for this.

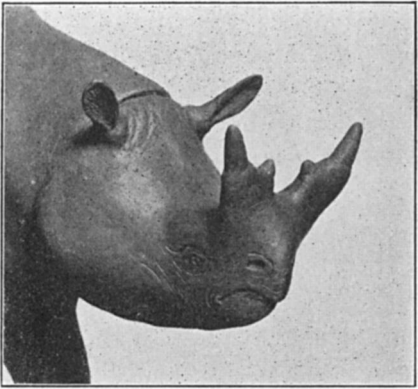
Restoration of M. coloradensis by Richard Swann Lull (1905), with speculative small keratinous horns on top of the bony horns

The distal (furthest point from the body) ends of Megacerops horns often have a roughened surface. In many skulls, this roughened surface also extends further down around the nose and the eye orbits. The surface is similar to roughened patches beneath the horns on modern rhinoceros skulls. In 1905, Richard Swann Lull speculated that the roughened surface on brontothere skulls, especially at the ends of the horns, could have supported additional, smaller horns of keratin that were anatomically similar to the horns of rhinoceroses. Lull proposed that the two bony horns could have supported two to four (one to two per horn) additional such structures on their distal ends.

Brontothere horns are believed to have been used for intraspecific combat. Based on the shape of the horns, rivals would have been able to lock horns with each other, and thus protect vulnerable areas, such as their sides, from strikes. The horns were probably most well suited to wrestling in this fashion, as well as pushing, and side-to-side strikes. The base of Megacerops horns may have been too thin and spongy for the horns to be used in head-on collisions, like in modern bighorn sheep. Megacerops had very strong neck musculature, which means that rivals may also have been able to topple each other with upward thrusts, and headbutting. The sides of Megacerops was probably the main focus of attack. One Megacerops fossil (AMNH 518) preserves a rib that was broken and healed during the life of the animal. It is unlikely that any other animal than another Megacerops could have inflicted such an injury. Some brontothere horns show evidence of secondary bone growth, perhaps regrowth due to clashes with other brontotheres.

=== Diet ===
Brontotheres such as Megacerops had relatively low-crowned cheek teeth. This, and their general dental morphology, restricted them to a browsing diet; their teeth were used to shear or crush plants. Megacerops were folivores and/or frugivores, though their large size suggests that they must have been relatively non-selective when it came to food. The diet of Megacerops was probably similar to the diets of modern-day moose and black rhinoceros.

=== Social behavior ===
Megacerops fossils have been found in mass death assemblages. Mass deaths of several individuals together indicates that they were social animals, and that they may have traveled in herds.

== Paleoecology ==
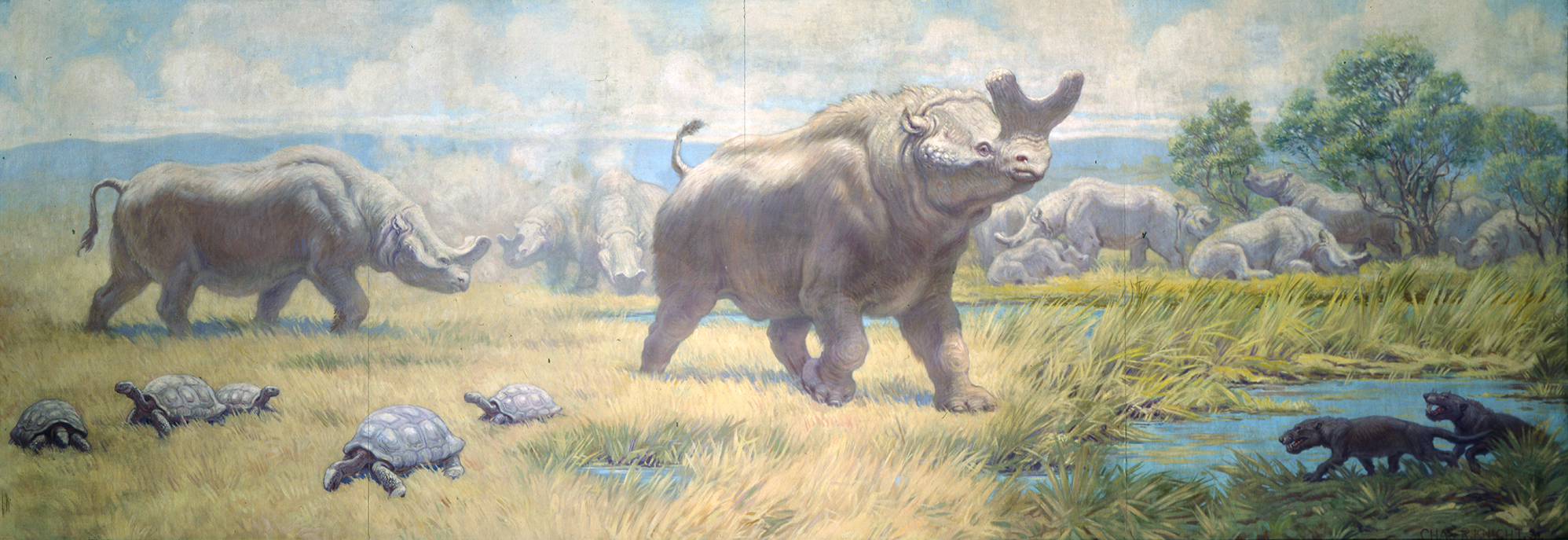
Megacerops painted by Charles R. Knight (1931)

Megacerops lived in a warm temperate to subtropical environment, in forests and open woodlands. Paleoclimatological analyses suggest that Chadronian North America was home to woodland-savannas and woody scrublands, and that the presence of fully treeless grassland biomes is unlikely. Oxygen isotope analyses of Megacerops tooth enamel from the White River Group has revealed low δ^{18}O values and low δ^{13}C values. This suggests that Megacerops preferred to feed, and perhaps live, in wetter and denser parts of the ecosystem, such as riparian areas. In 2013, Grant S. Boardman and Ross Secord accordingly interpreted Megacerops as a forest-dwelling animal.

Megacerops was by far the largest animal in its environment. Like large animals of today, Megacerops would have played an important ecological role in shaping the environment that they inhabited. Based on their body size, the approximate home range (the area in which an animal lives and moves on a periodic basis) of Megacerops has been estimated at 20 square kilometres (4,900 acres).

The White River badlands preserve perhaps the best Late Eocene fossil record in North America, which means that the fauna contemporary with Megacerops is known in great detail. The large herbivore fauna included representatives from a large number of different groups. Fellow perissodactyls included early anchitheriine equids (Mesohippus) and a variety of rhinoceratoids, including hippopotamus-like amynodonts (Metamynodon), hyracodonts (Hyracodon), and early types of true rhinoceroses (Trigonias and Subhyracodon). A multitude of artiodactyl groups were also present, anthracotheriid hippopotamoids (Aepinacodon and Elomeryx), entelodonts (Archaeotherium), merycoidodonts (Agriochoerus, Bathygenys, Merycoidodon, and Oreonetes), peccaries (Perchoerus), protoceratids (Pseudoprotoceras), early camels without humps (the oromerycid Eotylopus and the camelid Poebrotherium), and early ruminants (Hypertragulus and Leptomeryx). The small mammals of the ecosystem included various rabbits and several rodent groups, including beavers, gophers, mice, and squirrels.

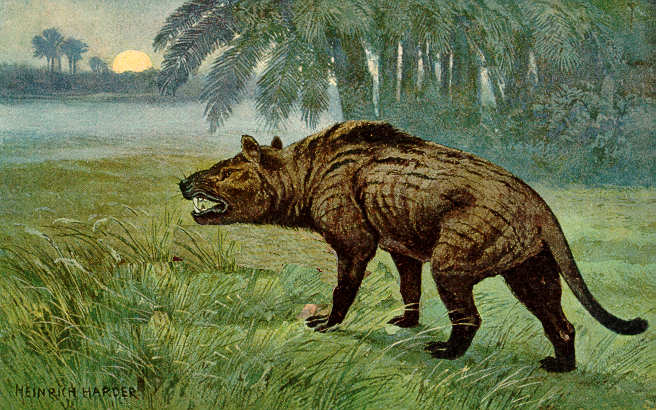
Hyaenodon megaloides, about the size of a modern lion, was the largest predator contemporary with Megacerops

A variety of predators coexisted with Megacerops, including amphicyonids ("bear-dogs"; Brachyrhynchocyon, Daphoenictis, and Daphoenus), canids (Hesperocyon), feliforms (Paleogale), hyaenodonts (several species of Hyaenodon), mustelids (Mustelavus), nimravids ("false saber-toothed cats"; Dinictis and Hoplophoneus), and ursoids (Parictis). The largest contemporary predator was Hyaenodon megaloides, which weighed around 165 kilograms (364 lb), about the size of a modern lion. It is unlikely that any contemporary predator would have been able to hunt adult Megacerops on account of their great size. Even juvenile Megacerops were large compared to contemporary predators and would have been difficult to prey on. Circumstantial evidence may suggest that Megacerops formed part of the diet of H. megaloides in some way; both Megacerops and H. megaloides went extinct at or before the end of the Chadronian, and no predator as large as H. megaloides is known from the Orellan, the North American land mammal age that succeeded the Chadronian.

== Extinction ==
The brontotheres went extinct at the end of the Eocene. No brontothere fossils are known from the Orellan in North America. Megacerops was the last brontothere on the continent, and the last living member of the Brontotheriita. Judging by the size of Megacerops and its relatives, and the development of its horns, the brontotheres apparently died out when they were at the peak of their evolutionary development. It is unlikely that Megacerops went extinct due to competition with other animals; no contemporary mammal approached it in size and no new mammals comparable to Megacerops in size are known from the Orellan.

Brontotheres are one of several mammal groups that went extinct in the Eocene–Oligocene extinction event, when a period of glaciation coincided with extinctions in several different mammal groups. The temperature changes at the boundary between the Eocene and Oligocene dramatically impacted vegetation, leading to a large-scale replacement of Eocene forests, on which brontotheres depended, with savanna environments. Megacerops would have been drastically impacted by such an environmental change, since isotope analyses suggest that it preferred moister and denser habitats. The habitats preferred by Megacerops were still present to some extent in the Orellan, as indicated by rare fossil finds of the tapiroid Colodon, but they were probably much reduced.
