= Acrimeroceras =

Acrimeroceras Temporal range: Devonian

Scientific classification
- Domain: Eukaryota
- Kingdom: Animalia
- Phylum: Mollusca
- Class: Cephalopoda
- Subclass: †Ammonoidea
- Order: †Goniatitida
- Family: †Dimeroceratidae
- Subfamily: †Paratornoceratinae
- Genus: †Acrimeroceras; Becker, 1993

Extinct genus of molluscs

Acrimeroceras is an oxyconic Devonian goniatite and one of three genera included in the subfamily Paratornoceratinae. The others being Paratornoceras and Paratoceras or ex Polonites.

Acrimeroceras has a shell like that of Paratornoceras with biconvex growth lines and constrictions and simple dorsal lobe. The adult shell is extremely compressed, smooth, oxyconic to lanceolate in section. Early growth stages are depressed, subglobular, smooth or ribbed, with an open umbilicus and rounded to suboxyconic venter, which sharpens relatively early during ontogeny. Sutural elements in general are broadly rounded except for the lateral lobe which is pointed and asymmetric.
