= Dimeroceratinae =

Scientific classification
- Kingdom: Animalia
- Phylum: Mollusca
- Class: Cephalopoda
- Subclass: †Ammonoidea
- Order: †Goniatitida
- Family: †Dimeroceratidae
- Subfamily: †Dimeroceratinae; Hyatt, 1884

Genera
- Dimeroceras; Paradimeroceras

Extinct subfamily of molluscs

Dimeroceratinae is one of three subfamilies of the Dimeroceratidae family, a member of the Goniatitida order. They are an extinct group of ammonoid, which are shelled cephalopods related to squids, belemnites, octopuses, and cuttlefish, and more distantly to the nautiloids.
