= Sinotitinae =

Sinotitinae Temporal range: Upper Devonian

Scientific classification
- Kingdom: Animalia
- Phylum: Mollusca
- Class: Cephalopoda
- Subclass: †Ammonoidea
- Order: †Goniatitida
- Family: †Dimeroceratidae
- Subfamily: †Sinotitinae; Chang, 1960

Genera
- Sinotites; Sunites

Extinct subfamily of molluscs

Sinotitinae is one of three subfamilies of the Dimeroceratidae; a member of the Goniatitida, an extinct order of ammonoid cephalopods from the Paleozoic.

The two comprised genera, Sinutites and Sunites have broad, crescent shaped whorl sections, but one, Sinutites has a dorsal siphuncle while in the other, Sunites the siphuncle is ventral.
