= Paratornoceratinae =

Paratornoceratinae Temporal range: Devonian

Scientific classification
- Domain: Eukaryota
- Kingdom: Animalia
- Phylum: Mollusca
- Class: Cephalopoda
- Subclass: †Ammonoidea
- Order: †Goniatitida
- Family: †Dimeroceratidae
- Subfamily: †Paratornoceratinae; Ebbighausen, Becker, & Bockwinkel, 2002

Genera
- Acrimeroceras; Paratornoceras; Polonites

Extinct subfamily of molluscs

Paratornoceratinae is a subfamily of oxyconic dimeroceratids included in the order Goniatitida, a group of Paleozoic ammonoids, which have closer affinity to living coleoids than to Nautilus.

Paratornoceratinae as defined by Ebbighausen, Becker, & Bockwinkel in 2002 comprises three recognised genera with sharp, oxyconic, venters; Acrimeroceras, Paratornoceras, and Polonites. The shell, as described for the type, Paratornoceras, is subglobular and evolute on young stages, but discoidal and with closed umbilicus in the adult.
