= Dimeroceratidae =

Dimeroceratidae Temporal range: Devonian

Scientific classification
- Domain: Eukaryota
- Kingdom: Animalia
- Phylum: Mollusca
- Class: Cephalopoda
- Subclass: †Ammonoidea
- Order: †Goniatitida
- Superfamily: †Dimeroceratoidea
- Family: †Dimeroceratidae; Hyatt 1884

Subfamilies
- Dimeroceratinae; Paratornoceratinae; Sinotitinae

Extinct family of molluscs

Dimeroceratidae is one of three families in the Dimeroceratoidea, a goniatid superfamily included in the Ammonoidea; extinct shelled cephalopods with adorally convex septa and usually narrow ventro-marginal siphuncles.

The family Dimeroceratidae was established for the genus Dimeroceras which was previously included in the Cheiloceratidae in the Treatise on Invertebrate Paleontology Part L, but differing from the similar subglublar to thickly lenticular Cheiloceras in having a large lateral lobe and the umbilical lobe outside the umbilicus.

The Dimeroceratidae are derived from the Cheiloceratid genus Torleyoceras through the ancestral Paradimeroceras which gave rise to Dimeroceras, (Saunders et al. 1999). Other genera included are Paratornoceras and Acrimeroceras.

Dimeroceratids have been found in the Devonian of China and Australia.
