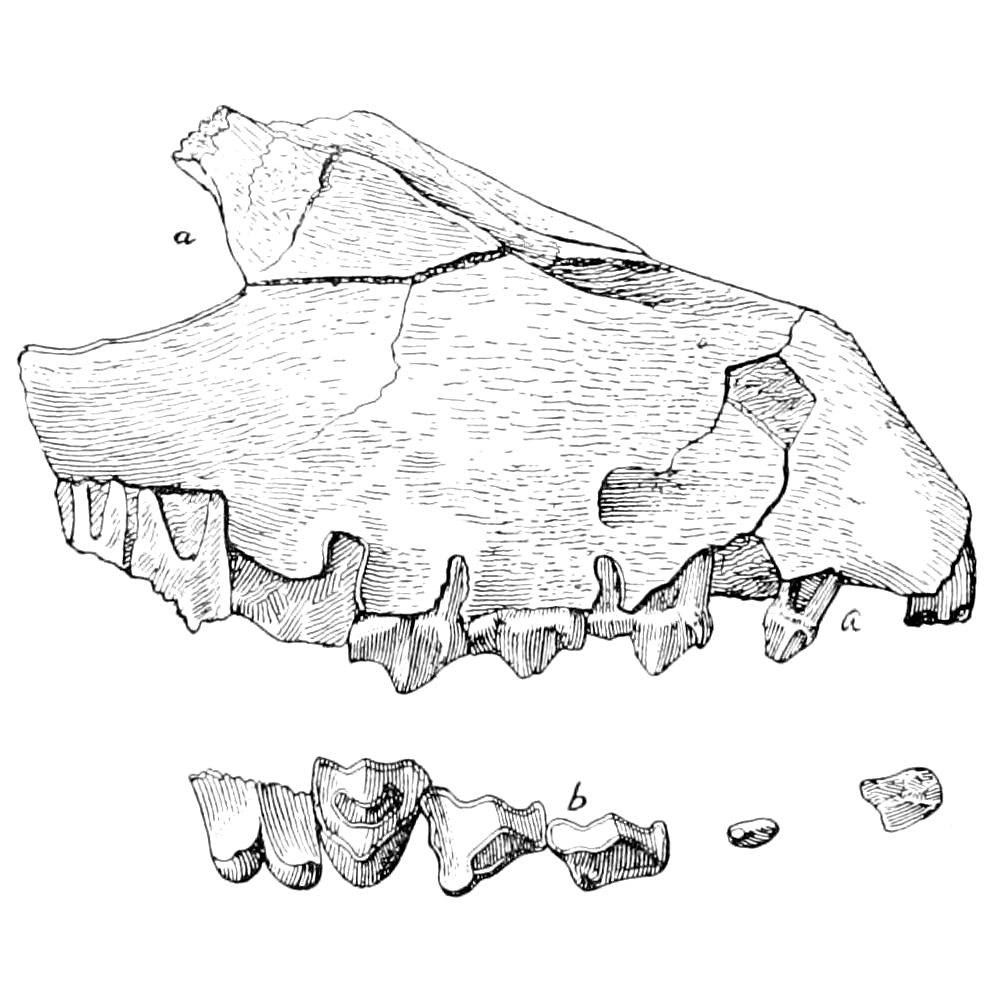

Scientific classification
- Domain: Eukaryota
- Kingdom: Animalia
- Phylum: Chordata
- Class: Mammalia
- Order: Artiodactyla
- Family: †Protoceratidae
- Genus: †Trigenicus; Douglass 1903

Species
- T. profectus Matthew 1903

= Trigenicus =

Trigenicus Temporal range: Late Eocene

Extinct genus of mammals

Trigenicus is an extinct genus of small artiodactyl in the family Protoceratidae, endemic to North America. It lived from the Late Eocene 37.2—33.9 Ma, existing for approximately 3 million years. Trigenicus resembled deer, but were more closely related to camelids.

== Fossil distribution ==
Fossils have been recovered from:

- Toadstool Park, Chadron Formation, Sioux County, Nebraska
- Peanut Peak, Chadron Formation, Oglala Lakota County, South Dakota
- Little Spring Gulch, Cook Ranch Formation, Beaverhead County, Montana
- Carnagh, Cypress Hills Formation, Saskatchewan
