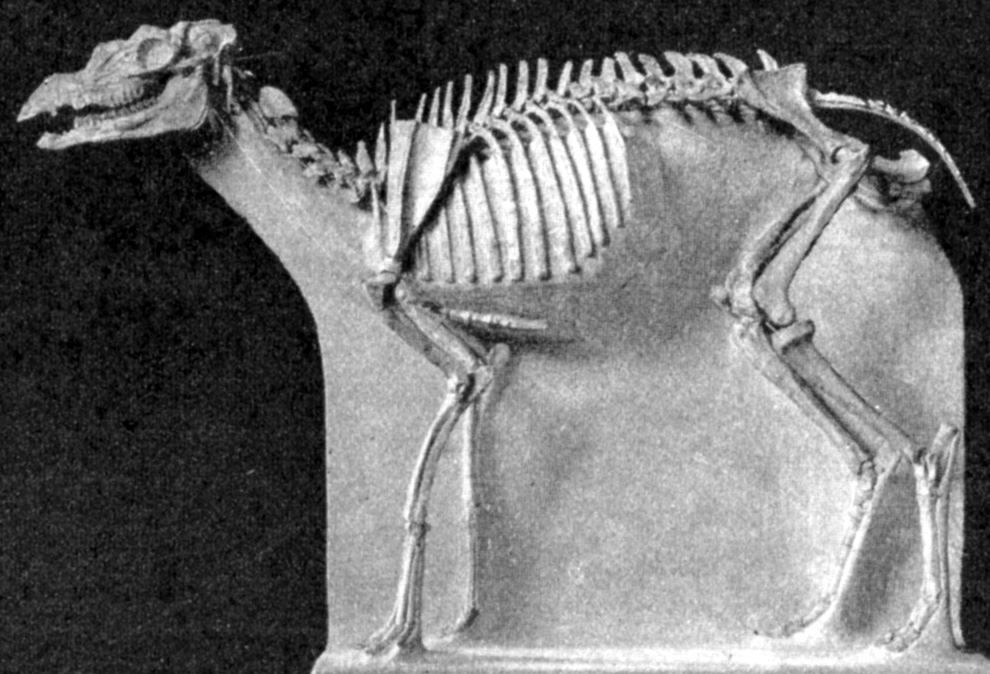
- Protoceras celer skeleton

Scientific classification
- Kingdom: Animalia
- Phylum: Chordata
- Class: Mammalia
- Order: Artiodactyla
- Family: †Protoceratidae
- Subfamily: †Protoceratinae
- Genus: †Protoceras; Marsh, 1891

Type species
- †Protoceras celer

Species
- P. celer Marsh 1891; P. neatodelpha Patton & Taylor 1973; P. skinneri Patton & Taylor 1973

= Protoceras =

Protoceras Temporal range: Oligocene–Early Miocene

Extinct genus of mammals

Protoceras ('first horn') is an extinct genus of Artiodactyla, of the family Protoceratidae, endemic to North America. It lived from the Oligocene to the Early Miocene 33.3—16.0 Ma, existing for approximately 17 million years.

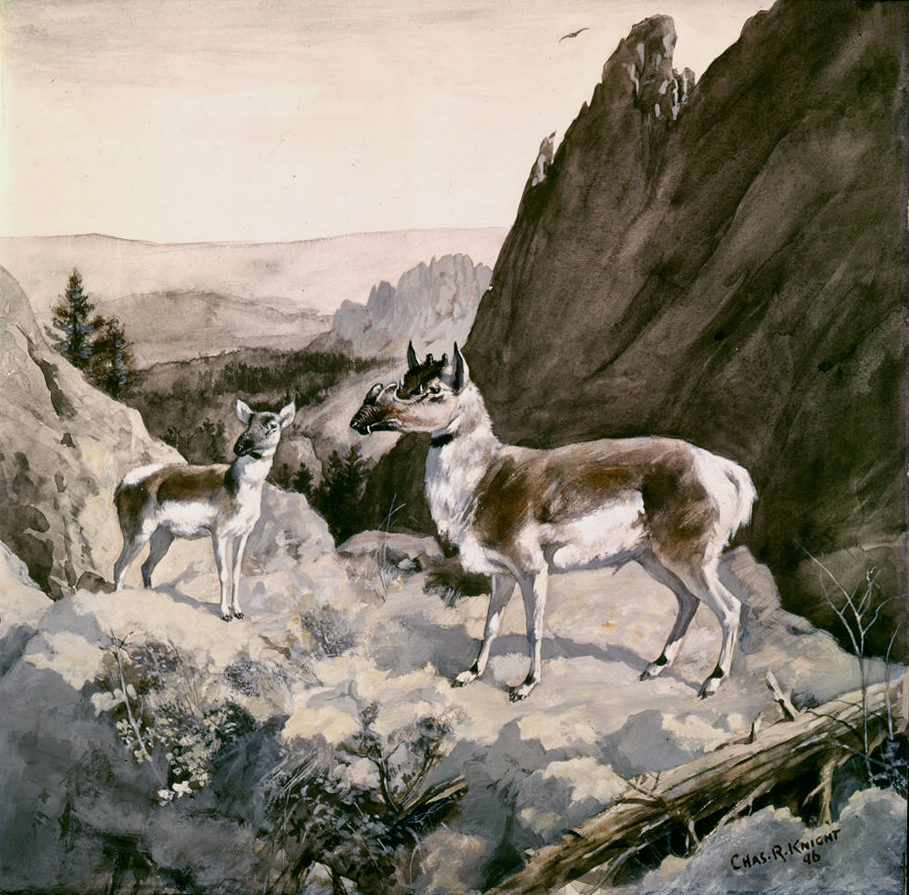
Restoration of female and male by Charles R. Knight

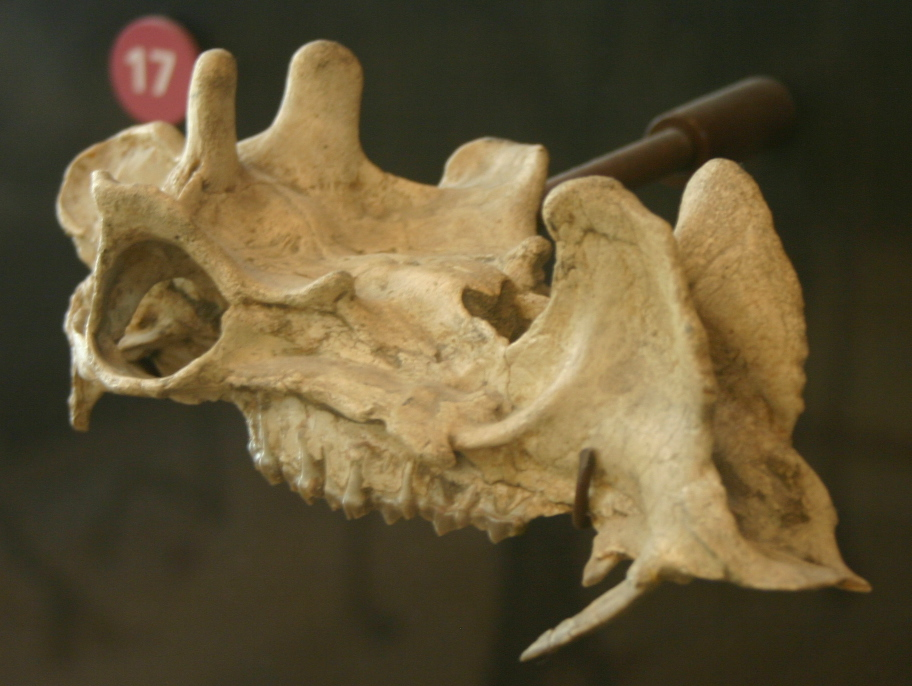
Male Protoceras celer skull

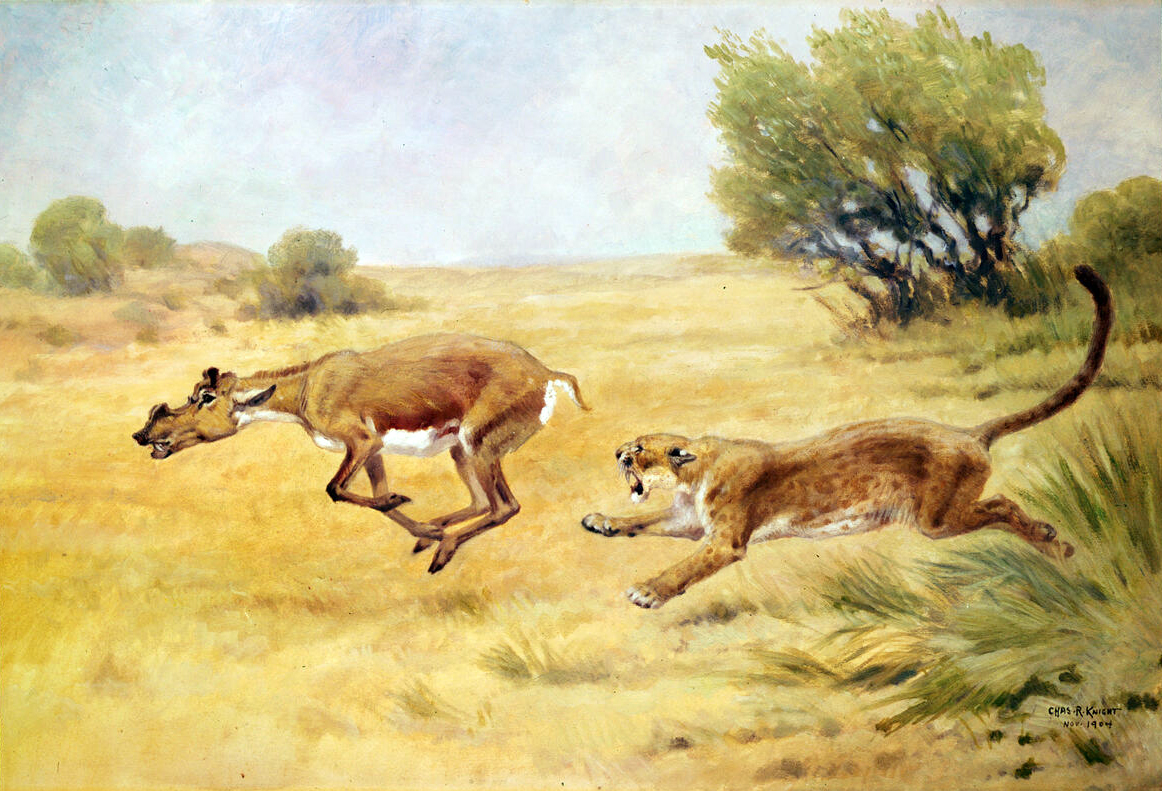
Restoration of Dinictis and Protoceras by Charles R. Knight

== Morphology ==
Protoceras was 1 metre (3 ft 3 in) long and resembled a deer in terms of body shape. Like some other protoceratids it had three pairs of blunt horns on its skull. In life these were probably covered with skin, much like the ossicones of a giraffe. Protoceras was sexually dimorphic: females only had one pair of horns, on the back of the skull, which was shorter than the same pair in males. Males probably used these horns for display, impressing females, or intimidating rivals. Due to the orientation of the horns the males probably displayed them sideways instead of frontally.

Protoceras was one of the earliest and most primitive protoceratids, still possessing upper incisors and four functional toes (later genera had only two functional, hooved toes). It lived in the deserts of the Late Oligocene, alongside the oreodont Leptauchenia.
