= Eosictis =

Eosictis Temporal range: ?early to late Eocene

Scientific classification
- Kingdom: Animalia
- Phylum: Chordata
- Class: Mammalia
- Clade: Carnivoraformes
- Family: †Miacidae
- Genus: †Eosictis; Scott (1945)

Type species
- †Eosictis avinoffi

Species
- †E. avinoffi

Extinct genus of carnivores

Eosictis is an extinct genus of Miacidae. It was first named by Scott in 1945, and contains one species, Eosictis avinoffi.

== Sources ==
- taxonomicon.taxonomy.nl
- paleodb.org
