= Poabromylus =

Poabromylus Temporal range: Late Eocene

Scientific classification
- Kingdom: Animalia
- Phylum: Chordata
- Class: Mammalia
- Infraclass: Placentalia
- Order: Artiodactyla
- Family: †Protoceratidae
- Genus: †Poabromylus; Peterson 1932

Type species
- †Poabromylus kayi

Species
- P. golzi Black 1978; P. kayi Peterson 1932; P. robustus Stock 1949
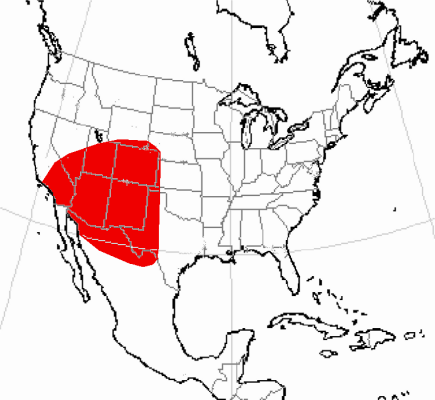
- Range of Poabromylus based on fossil record

Extinct genus of mammals

Poabromylus is an extinct genus of small artiodactyl, of the family Protoceratidae, endemic to North America. They lived during the Late Eocene 40.4–33.9 Ma, existing for approximately 6 million years. They resembled deer but were more closely related to camelids.

== Fossil distribution ==
Fossils have been recovered from:

- Big Red Horizon, Chambers Tuff Formation, Presidio County, Texas
- Titus Canyon, Titus Canyon Formation, Inyo County, California
- Titanothere Quarry, Duchesne River Formation, Uintah County, Utah
- Badwater Locality, Wagon Bed Formation, Natrona County, Wyoming
