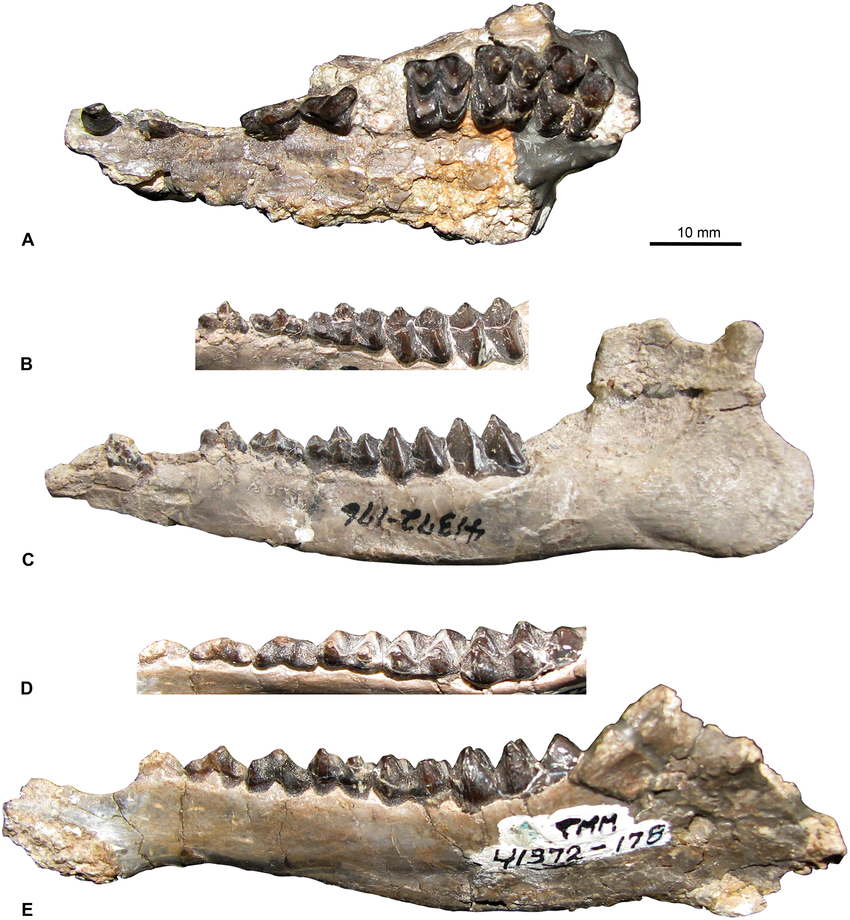
- Leptoreodon marshi

Scientific classification
- Kingdom: Animalia
- Phylum: Chordata
- Class: Mammalia
- Order: Artiodactyla
- Family: †Protoceratidae
- Genus: †Leptoreodon; Wortman 1898

Species
- L. marshi Wortman 1898 (type); L. edwardsi Stock 1936; L. golzi Ludtke & Prothero, 2004; L. leptolophus Golz, 1976; L. major Golz, 1976; L. pusillus Golz, 1976; L. stocki Kelly, 1990
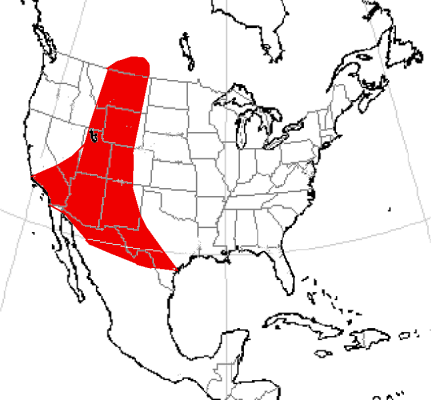

= Leptoreodon =

Leptoreodon Temporal range: Late Eocene Bartonian to Early Priabonian 40.7-37.2 Ma

Extinct genus of mammals

Leptoreodon is an extinct genus of small artiodactyl, of the family Protoceratidae, endemic to North America. It lived during the Late Eocene 40.4—37.2 Ma, existing for approximately 3 million years. Leptoreodon resembled deer, but were more closely related to camelids.

== Fossil distribution ==
Fossils have been recovered from:

- Devil's Graveyard Formation, Brewster County, Texas
- Webb County, Texas
- Swift Current Creek, Cypress Hills Formation, Saskatchewan
