= Heteromeryx =

Heteromeryx Temporal range: Late Eocene

Scientific classification
- Kingdom: Animalia
- Phylum: Chordata
- Class: Mammalia
- Order: Artiodactyla
- Family: †Protoceratidae
- Genus: †Heteromeryx; Matthew 1905

Species
- Heteromeryx dispar

Extinct genus of mammals

Heteromeryx is an extinct genus of artiodactyl, of the family Protoceratidae, endemic to North America. They lived during the Late Eocene 37.2—33.9 Ma, existing for approximately 3 million years. They resembled deer, but were more closely related to camelids.

Its name comes from hetero (ἕτερος) "different' and meryx "ruminant".

== Fossil distribution ==
Fossils have been recovered from:

- Big Red Horizon Site, Presidio County, Texas
- Dirty Creek Ridge Site, Sioux County, Nebraska
- French Creek Site, Custer County, South Dakota
