= Leptotragulus =

Leptotragulus Temporal range: Middle Eocene

Scientific classification
- Kingdom: Animalia
- Phylum: Chordata
- Class: Mammalia
- Order: Artiodactyla
- Family: †Protoceratidae
- Genus: †Leptotragulus; Scott & Osborn, 1887

Species
- L. clarki Gazin, 1955; L. medius Peterson, 1919; L. proavus Scott & Osborn 1887; L. ultimus Schlaikjer, 1935
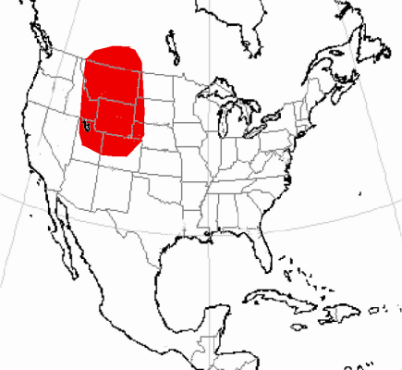
- Range of Leptotragulus based on fossil record

Extinct genus of mammals

Leptotragulus is an extinct genus of protoceratid, endemic to North America. It lived during the Middle Eocene epoch (Uintan to Chadronian stage) 40.2—33.9 Ma, existing for approximately 6 million years.

Leptotragulus resembled deer, but were more closely related to camelids. This genus, as well as many other Leptotragulines, was completely hornless.

== Fossil distribution ==
Fossils have been recovered from:

- Goshen Hole Formation, Goshen County, Wyoming
- Wiggins Formation, Fremont County, Wyoming
