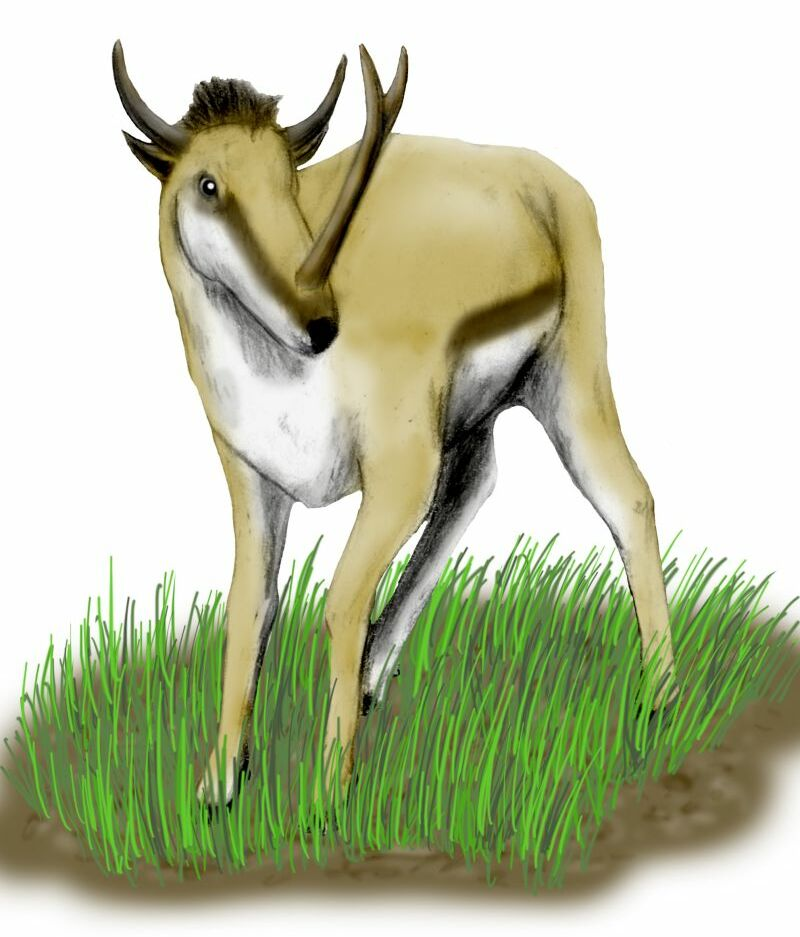
- Synthetoceras

Scientific classification
- Kingdom: Animalia
- Phylum: Chordata
- Class: Mammalia
- Order: Artiodactyla
- Family: †Protoceratidae; Marsh, 1891

Subfamilies, Tribes and Genera
- †Leptotragulinae: †Heteromeryx; †Leptoreodon; †Leptotragulus; †Poabromylus; †Toromeryx; †Trigenicus; †Protoceratinae: †Paratoceras; †Protoceras; †Pseudoprotoceras; †Synthetoceratinae: †Kyptoceratini; †Kyptoceras; †Syndyoceras; †Synthetoceratini; †Lambdoceras; †Prosynthetoceras; †Synthetoceras
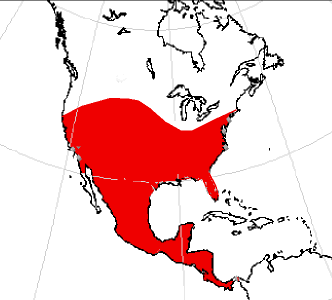
- Range of Protoceratidae based on fossil record.

= Protoceratidae =

Protoceratids Temporal range: Middle Eocene–Early Pliocene

Extinct family of mammals

Protoceratidae is an extinct family of herbivorous North American artiodactyls (even-toed ungulates) that lived during the Eocene through Pliocene. While early members of the group were hornless, in later members males developed elaborate cranial ornamentation. They are variously allied with Ruminantia or Tylopoda.

== Classification ==
Protoceratidae was erected by Othniel Charles Marsh in 1891, with the type genus Protoceras and assigned to the Artiodactyla. Its exact placement within Artiodactyla is a matter of some debate. It has been assigned to Ruminantia or Tylopoda by different authors.

== Morphology ==
When alive, protoceratids would have resembled deer, though they were not directly related. Protoceratids ranged from 1 to 2 m in length, from about the size of a roe deer to an elk. Unlike many modern ungulates, their digits II and V were not reduced, and their metatarsals were not fused into a cannon bone. This suggests they were less cursorial than modern ruminants. Their dentition was similar to that of modern deer and cattle, suggesting they fed on tough grasses and similar foods, with a complex stomach similar to that of camels. At least some forms are believed to have lived in herds.

The most dramatic feature of the protoceratids, however, were the horns of the males. In addition to having horns in the more usual place, protoceratids had additional, rostral horns above their noses. These horns were either paired, as in Syndyoceras, or fused at the base, and branching into two near the tip, as in Synthetoceras. In life, the horns were probably covered with skin, much like the ossicones of a giraffe. The females were either hornless, or had far smaller horns than the males. Horns were therefore probably used in sexual display or competition for mates. In later forms, the horns were large enough to have been used in sparring between males, much as with the antlers of some modern deer.

== Genera by epoch ==
=== Eocene ===
- Heteromeryx
- Leptoreodon
- Leptotragulus
- Poabromylus
- Pseudoprotoceras
- Toromeryx
- Trigenicus

=== Oligocene ===
- Protoceras

=== Miocene ===
- Paratoceras
- Lambdoceras
- Prosynthetoceras
- Synthetoceras
- Syndyoceras

=== Pliocene ===
- Kyptoceras
