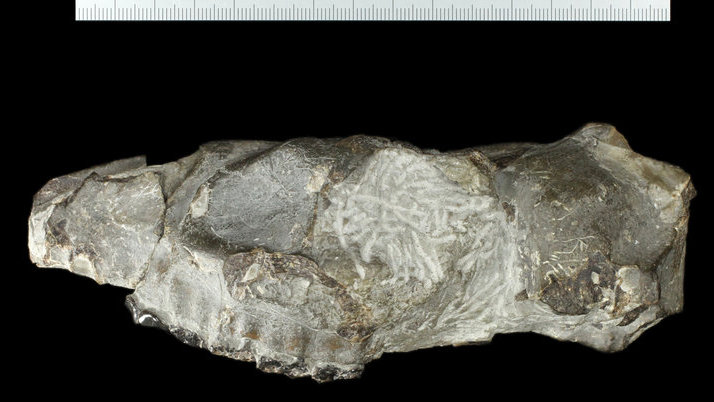

Scientific classification
- Kingdom: Animalia
- Phylum: Chordata
- Class: Mammalia
- Order: Artiodactyla
- Family: †Protoceratidae
- Genus: †Paratoceras; Frick 1937

Type species
- †Paratoceras macadamsi

Species
- See text
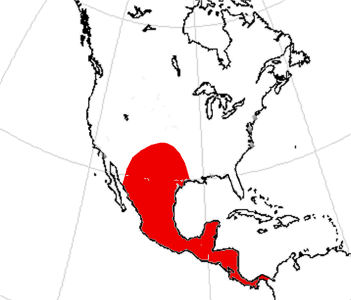
- Range of Paratoceras based on fossil record

= Paratoceras =

Paratoceras Temporal range: Middle Miocene

Extinct genus of mammals

Paratoceras is an extinct genus of Artiodactyla, of the family Protoceratidae, endemic to North America. They lived during the Early to Middle Miocene, 20.4—10.3 Ma, existing for approximately 10 million years. Paratoceras resembled deer, but were probably more closely related to chevrotains. In addition to having horns on the top of the head, they had a third horn on the snout.

== Species ==
- P. coatesi Rincón et al., 2015
- P. friedmanae Jiménez-Hidalgo & Carbot-Chanona in Jiménez-Hidalgo, Carbot-Chanona & Gómez-Pérez, 2026
- P. macadamsi Frick, 1937
- P. orarius Rincón et al., 2015
- P. tedfordi Webb et al., 2003
- P. wardi Patton & Taylor, 1973

== Fossil distribution ==
Fossils have been recovered from:

- Gaillard Cut, Cucaracha Formation, Panama
- Balumtun Sandstone, Chiapas, Mexico
- Mazantic Shale, Chiapas, Mexico
- Suchilquitongo Formation, Oaxaca, Mexico
- Trinity River Pit 1, Fleming Formation, San Jacinto County, Texas
