= List of brontothere genera =

Extinct group of perissodactyl mammals

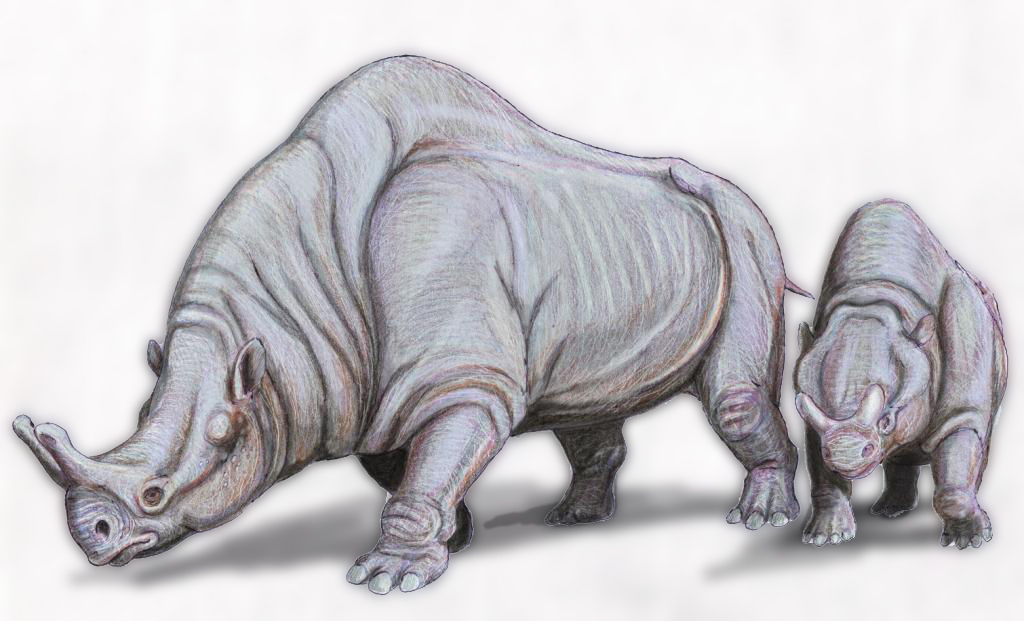
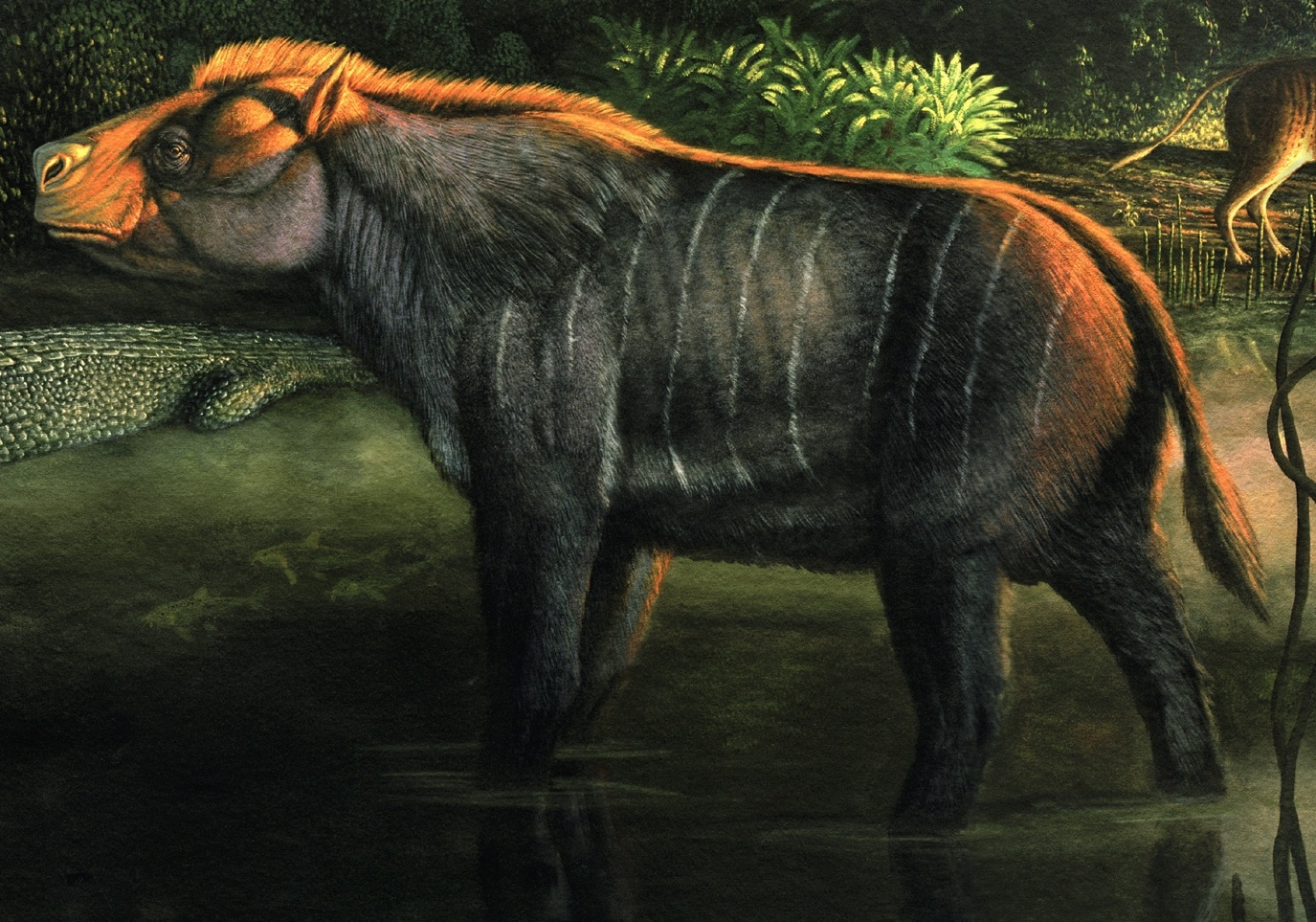
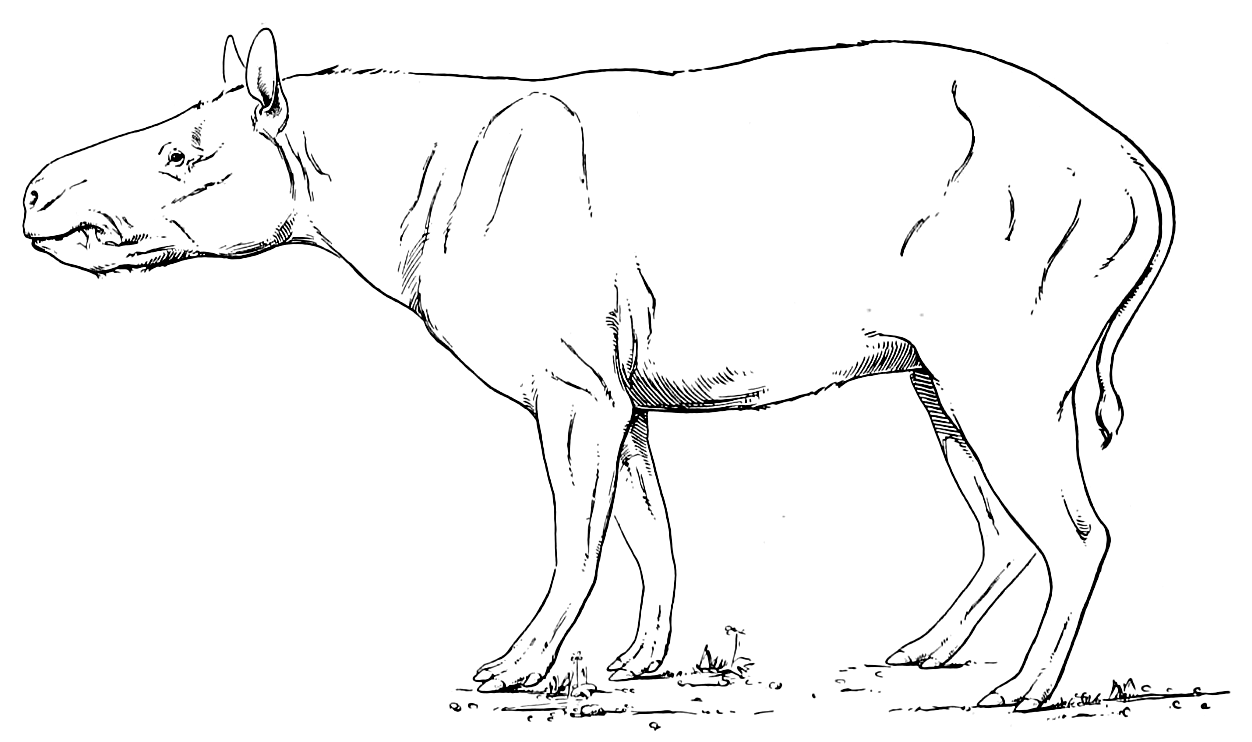
From top; left to right: Embolotherium, Megacerops, Telmatherium, Eotitanops

This list of brontotheres is a comprehensive listing of all genera that have ever been included in the family Brontotheriidae, excluding purely vernacular terms. The list includes all commonly accepted genera, but also genera that are now considered invalid, doubtful (nomen dubium), or were not formally published (nomen nudum), as well as junior synonyms of more established names, and genera that are no longer considered to be brontotheres.

The list includes 87 names, out of which 44 are considered valid genera whose classification in Brontotheriidae is not disputed.

== Scope and terminology ==
There is no official, canonical list of brontothere genera. This list follows the genera recognized in a 2008 monograph on brontotheres by Matthew C. Mihlbachler, unless otherwise cited to more recent literature.

Naming conventions and terminology follow the International Code of Zoological Nomenclature. Technical terms used include:

- Junior synonym: A name which describes the same taxon as a previously published name. If two or more genera are formally designated and the type specimens are later assigned to the same genus, the first to be published (in chronological order) is the senior synonym, and all other instances are junior synonyms. Senior synonyms are generally used, except by special decision of the ICZN, but junior synonyms cannot be used again, even if deprecated. Junior synonymy is often subjective, unless the genera described were both based on the same type specimen.
- Nomen nudum (Latin for "naked name"): A name that has appeared in print but has not yet been formally published by the standards of the ICZN. Nomina nuda (the plural form) are invalid, and are therefore not italicized as a proper generic name would be. If the name is later formally published, that name is no longer a nomen nudum and will be italicized on this list. Often, the formally published name will differ from any nomina nuda that describe the same specimen. In this case, these nomina nuda will be deleted from this list in favor of the published name.
- Preoccupied name: A name that is formally published, but which has already been used for another taxon. This second use is invalid (as are all subsequent uses) and the name must be replaced. As preoccupied names are not valid generic names, they will also go unitalicized on this list.
- Nomen dubium (Latin for "dubious name"): A name describing a fossil with no unique diagnostic features.

== List of genera ==
Genus	Authors	Year	Status	Location	Notes
Acrotitan	Ye	1983	Valid	China	
Aktautitan	Mihlbachler et al.	2004	Valid	Kazakhstan	
Allops	Marsh	1887	Jr. synonym	N/A	Synonym of Megacerops
Anisacodon	Marsh	1875	Preoccupied	N/A	Renamed to Diconodon since Anisacodon was preoccupied; Diconodon is a synonym of Megacerops
Arctotitan	Wang	1978	Dubious	China	Possibly a synonym of Gnathotitan
Ateleodon	Schlaikjer	1935	Jr. synonym	N/A	Synonym of Megacerops
Balochititanops	Missiaen, Gunnell, & Gingerich	2011	Valid	Pakistan	
Brachydiastematherium	Böckh & Matyasovski	1876	Valid	Romania	
Brontops	Marsh	1887	Jr. synonym	N/A	Synonym of Megacerops
Brontotherium	Marsh	1873	Jr. synonym	N/A	Synonym of Megacerops
Bunobrontops	Holroyd & Ciochon	2000	Valid	Myanmar	
Danjiangia	Wang	1995	Valid, classification disputed	China	Originally described as a chalicothere. A "lambdothere"; either a basal brontothere or a close relative.
Desmatotitan	Granger & Gregory	1943	Valid	China	
Dianotitan	Zhou, Chang, & Ting	1974	Valid	China	
Diconodon	Marsh	1876	Jr. synonym	N/A	Synonym of Megacerops
Diplacodon	Marsh	1875	Valid	United States	
Diploceras	Peterson	1914	Preoccupied	N/A	Renamed to Eotitanotherium since Diploceras was preoccupied; Eotitanotherium is a synonym of Diplacodon
Diploclonus	Marsh	1890	Jr. synonym	N/A	Synonym of Megacerops
Dolichorhinoides	Granger & Gregory	1943	Jr. synonym	N/A	Synonym of Epimanteoceras
Dolichorhinus	Hatcher	1895	Valid	United States	
Duchesneodus	Lucas & Schoch	1982	Valid	United States	
Eometarhinus	Osborn	1919	Jr. synonym	N/A	Synonym of Palaeosyops
Eotherium	Leidy	1853	Sr. synonym	N/A	Synonym of Megacerops
Eotitanops	Osborn	1907	Valid	Canada; Pakistan; United States	
Eotitanotherium	Peterson	1914	Jr. synonym	N/A	Synonym of Diplacodon
Embolotherium	Osborn	1929	Valid	China; Mongolia	
Epimanteoceras	Granger & Gregory	1943	Valid	China	
Eubrontotherium	Mihlbachler	2007	Valid	Mongolia; United States	
Fossendorhinus	Mihlbachler	2008	Valid	United States	
Gnathotitan	Granger & Gregory	1943	Valid	China	
Gobihippus	Dashzeveg	1979	Valid, classification disputed	Mongolia	Originally described as an equoid; possibly a "lambdothere" or basal brontothere
Haplacodon	Cope	1889	Jr. synonym	N/A	Synonym of Megacerops
Heterotitanops	Peterson	1914	Jr. synonym	N/A	Synonym of Metarhinus
Hyotitan	Granger & Gregory	1943	Dubious	China	Possibly a synonym of Qufutitan
Lambdotherium	Cope	1880	Valid, classification disputed	Canada; United States	A "lambdothere"; a basal brontothere, a close relative, or a relative of the palaeotheres
Leidyotherium	Prout	1860	Sr. synonym	N/A	Synonym of Megacerops
Leurocephalus	Osborn, Scott, & Speir	1878	Jr. synonym	N/A	Synonym of Telmatherium
Limnohyops	Marsh	1890	Jr. synonym	N/A	Synonym of Palaeosyops
Limnohyus	Marsh	1872	Jr. synonym	N/A	Synonym of Palaeosyops
Manteoceras	Hatcher	1895	Jr. synonym	N/A	Synonym of Telmatherium
Maobrontops	Averianov et al.	2018	Valid	China	
Megaceratops	Cope	1873	Jr. synonym	N/A	Synonym of Megacerops; intended as a replacement name on "etymologic grounds"
Megacerops	Leidy	1870	Valid	Canada; United States	
Menodus	Pomel	1849	Sr. synonym	N/A	Synonym of Megacerops
Menops	Marsh	1887	Jr. synonym	N/A	Synonym of Megacerops
Mesatirhinus	Osborn	1908	Valid	United States	
Metarhinus	Osborn	1908	Valid	United States	
Metatelmatherium	Granger & Gregory	1943	Valid	China; United States	
Metatitan	Granger & Gregory	1943	Valid	China; Mongolia	
Microdonta	Stovall	1948	Nomen nudum	N/A	Undescribed name used for a juvenile brontothere jaw from Texas
Microtitan	Granger & Gregory	1943	Valid	China	
Miobasileus	Cope	1873	Nomen nudum	N/A	Name used for a since lost brontothere skull from Colorado. Presumably a synonym of Megacerops.
Mulkrajanops	Kumar & Sahni	1985	Dubious, classification disputed	India; Pakistan	Fragmentary; probably valid but might not be a brontothere
Nanotitan	Qi & Beard	1996	Preoccupied	N/A	Renamed to Nanotitanops since Nanotitan was preoccupied
Nanotitanops	Qi & Beard	1998	Valid	China	
Nasamplus	Mihlbachler	2008	Valid	China	
Notiotitanops	Gazin & Sullivan	1942	Valid	United States	
Oreinotherium	Russell	1934	Dubious, classification disputed	Canada	Fragmentary, originally described as a chalicothere; possibly a brontothere
Pachytitan	Granger & Gregory	1943	Valid	China	
Pakotitanops	West	1980	Dubious	Pakistan	Probably valid, but based on insufficient fossil material
Palaeosyops	Leidy	1870	Valid	Canada; Pakistan; United States	
Parabrontops	Granger & Gregory	1943	Valid	China; Mongolia	
Parvicornus	Mihlbachler & Deméré	2009	Valid	United States	
Pollyosbornia	Mihlbachler	2008	Valid	United States	
Protembolotherium	Yanovskaya	1954	Valid	Mongolia	
Protitan	Granger & Gregory	1943	Valid	China	
Protitanops	Stock	1936	Valid	Mexico; United States	
Protitanotherium	Hatcher	1895	Valid	United States	
Pseudodiplacodon	Mader	2000	Jr. synonym	N/A	Synonym of Diplacodon
Pygmaetitan	Miao	1982	Valid	China	
Qufutitan	Wang & Wang	1997	Valid	China	
Rhadinorhinus	Riggs	1912	Jr. synonym	N/A	Synonym of Metarhinus
Rhinotitan	Granger & Gregory	1943	Valid	China	
Sivatitanops	Pilgrim	1925	Dubious	Bulgaria; Myanmar	Possibly a synonym of Brachydiastematherium
Sphenocoelus	Osborn	1895	Valid	United States	
Sthenodectes	Gregory	1912	Valid	United States	
Symborodon	Cope	1873	Jr. synonym	N/A	Synonym of Megacerops
Tanyorhinus	Cook	1926	Jr. synonym	N/A	Synonym of Sphenocoelus
Teleodus	Marsh	1890	Jr. synonym	N/A	Synonym of Megacerops; most fossils reassigned to Duchesneodus
Telmatherium	Marsh	1872	Valid	United States	
Telmatotherium	Marsh	1880	Jr. synonym	N/A	Synonym of Telmatherium
Titanodectes	Granger & Gregory	1943	Valid	China	Has been suggested to be a synonym of Embolotherium
Titanops	Marsh	1887	Jr. synonym	N/A	Synonym of Megacerops
Titanotherium	Leidy	1852	Sr. synonym	N/A	Synonym of Megacerops
Wickia	Mihlbachler	2008	Valid	United States	
Xenicohippus	Bown & Kihm	1981	Valid, not a brontothere	N/A	Listed as a basal brontothere by McKenna & Bell (1997); since consistently classified as an equoid
Xylotitan	Mihlbachler & Samuels	2016	Valid	United States	

== Problematic species-level taxa ==
The 23 species listed below are considered dubious or otherwise problematic. Some are likely to be junior synonyms of established species whereas others may be distinct, but none are currently securely referred to a genus. The list uses the original generic assignments of the species but notes more recent classifications.

Species	Authors	Year	Location	Notes
"Eotitanotherium" lahirii	Pilgrim	1925	Myanmar	Referred to Metatelmatherium in 1939. Could be Sivatitanops birmanicum.
"Epimanteoceras" amplus	Yanovskaya	1976	Mongolia	Belongs to a brontothere similar to Embolotherium and Protembolotherium, not Epimanteoceras. Could be Nasamplus progressus, but does not preserve overlapping fossil material with its holotype.
"Epimanteoceras" praecursor	Yanovskaya	1953	Kazakhstan	Non-diagnostic
"Manteoceras" foris	Cook	1926	United States	Based on unidentifiable juvenile fossils
"Manteoceras" pratensis	Cook	1926	United States	Based on unidentifiable juvenile fossils
"Megacerops" primitivus	Lambe	1908	Canada	Referred to Duchesneodus in 1982. Could be Duchesneodus uintensis, Megacerops kuwagatarhinus, Notiotitanops mississippiensis, or Protitanops curryi.
"Menodus" bakeri	Stovall	1948	United States	Non-diagnostic; likely a synonym of Protitanops curryi
"Menodus" mongoliensis	Osborn	1925	Mongolia	Isolated tooth; probably belongs to a species of Embolotherium or Titanodectes
"Menodus" rumelicus	Toula	1892	Bulgaria	Isolated teeth; possibly Sivatitanops, or fossils imported from the United States by laborers
"Metatelmatherium" brownii	Colbert	1938	Myanmar	Isolated teeth; could be Sivatitanops birmanicum
"Metatelmatherium" parvum	Granger & Gregory	1943	China	Non-diagnostic
"Microtitan" elongatus	Qi	1987	China	Non-diagnostic
"Palaeosyops" vallidens	Cope	1872	United States	Referred to Dolichorhinus in 1929. Non-diagnostic; could be Dolichorhinus hyognathus or Telmatherium validus.
"Protitan" cingulatus	Granger & Gregory	1943	China	Could be Epimanteoceras formosus
"Protitan" major	Huang & Zheng	2004	China	Non-diagnostic; could belong to a species of Metatitan
"Protitanotherium" koreanicum	Takai	1939	North Korea	Fossils too fragmentary to compare to other taxa; may belong to multiple taxa. Holotype destroyed in World War II.
"Rhinotitan" orientalis	Yanovskaya	1957	Russia	Fossils too fragmentary to compare to other taxa
"Rhinotitan" quadridens	Xu & Chiu	1962	China	Isolated teeth; non-diagnostic
"Sivatitanops" rugosidens	Pilgrim	1925	Myanmar	Holotype is probably Rhinotitan sp.
"Tanyorhinus" harundivorax	Cook	1926	United States	Non-diagnostic; could be Sphenocoelus uintensis or Wickia brevirhinus
"Teleodus" californicus	Stock	1935	United States	Referred to Duchesneodus in 1982. Could be Notiotitanops mississippiensis or Protitanops curryi.
"Teleodus" thyboi	Bjork	1967	United States	Referred to Duchesneodus in 1982. Could be Eubrontotherium clarnoensis, Notiotitanops mississippiensis, or Protitanops curryi.
"Titanotherium" bohemicum	Kiernik	1913	Czech Republic	Fragmentary jaw; possibly imported from the United States by laborers
