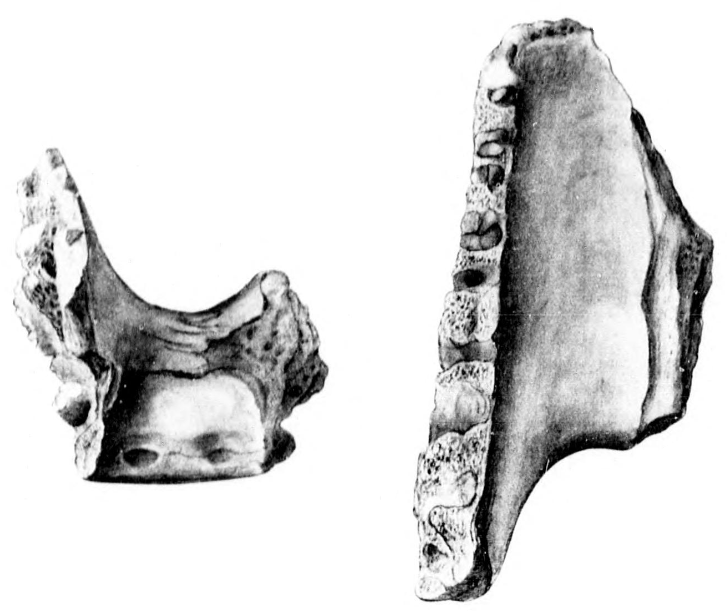
- Type specimen of O. bilobatum (NMC 6468)

Scientific classification
- Kingdom: Animalia
- Phylum: Chordata
- Class: Mammalia
- Order: Perissodactyla
- Family: †Brontotheriidae (?)
- Genus: †Oreinotherium; Russell, 1934
- Species: †O. bilobatum

Binomial name
- †Oreinotherium bilobatum (Cope, 1891) [originally Chalicotherium]

Synonyms
- Chalicotherium bilobatum Cope, 1891

= Oreinotherium =

Oreinotherium Temporal range: Late Eocene

Extinct genus of mammals

Oreinotherium (lit. 'mountain beast') is a dubious extinct genus of perissodactyl of uncertain affinities known from the Late Eocene of North America. A single species has been described, O. bilobatum, based on fragmentary fossils from the Cypress Hills in Saskatchewan, Canada. The fossils are too poorly preserved to allow Oreinotherium to be securely classified. Oreinotherium was originally described as a chalicothere, though most examinations since the 1960s have favored it as a brontothere.

== Research history ==
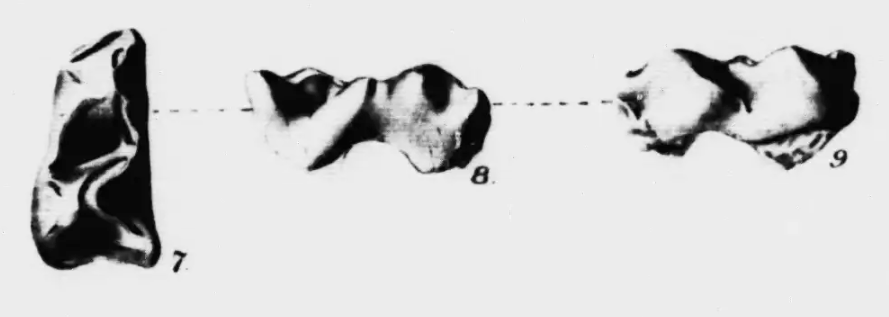
NMC 6469, a lower second premolar referred to O. bilobatum by Lawrence Lambe in 1908

Oreinotherium bilobatum was originally described in 1891 under the name Chalicotherium bilobatum by Edward Drinker Cope, who believed it to represent a chalicothere. C. bilobatum was based on fragmentary lower jaws (NMC 6468) found in the Cypress Hills near Assiniboia, Saskatchewan, consisting of the mandibular symphysis and a partial left ramus. None of the teeth are preserved in the fossil. Cope interpreted the alveoli (tooth sockets) to indicate three premolars and five molars. Cope listed no distinguishing characteristics for the species in his description. Had C. bilobatum belonged to Chalicotherium, it would have extended the known range of that genus (known only from Europe and Asia) to North America. Cope and some later authors treated the fossils as Oligocene in age, though the relevant Cypress Hills deposits have since been reassessed as Late Eocene.

In 1908, Lawrence Lambe provisionally referred an isolated lower second premolar from the Cypress Hills to C. bilobatum, largely because he interpreted the tooth as belonging to a chalicothere. Lambe's tooth (NMC 6469) is a deciduous tooth, and is the only fossil other than the type material to be assigned to C. bilobatum. On Lambe's request, William Berryman Scott also examined the tooth. Scott agreed with Lambe that the tooth probably belonged to a chalicothere, but considered it unlikely that it was Chalicotherium, since that genus is otherwise Miocene in age. Scott instead considered it likely that the Cypress Hills fossils belonged to a genus known from the Oligocene, such as Schizotherium. Lambe concluded that more material was needed to securely determine what genus C. bilobatum belonged to.

In 1913, William Jacob Holland and Olof August Peterson concluded that C. bilobatum "very probably does not represent a Chalicotherioid" based on "an examination of its dentition", though listed no specific features. Holland and Peterson classified C. bilobatum as incertae sedis. In 1934, Loris Shano Russell reassessed the fossils and considered them to be similar to the European chalicothere Macrotherium (now considered a synonym of Chalicotherium) in the depth of the mandible as well as the dental formula. Because of Macrotherium's younger age, Russell considered it unlikely that the fossils belonged to the same genus and moved C. bilobatum to a new genus, Oreinotherium.

== Description ==
Oreinotherium was a large perissodactyl. The O. bilobatum type jaw measures 120 millimetres (4.7 in) long. The poorly preserved fossils allow little to no information to be determined about the appearance and anatomy of the rest of the animal.

== Classification ==
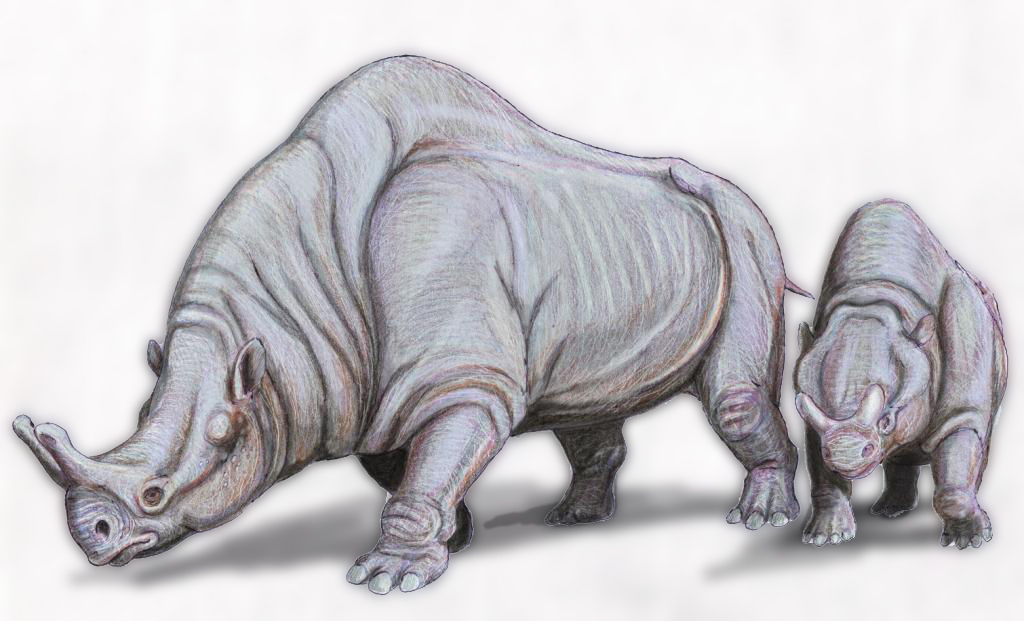
Oreinotherium might be a junior synonym of one of the large brontotheres known from the Cypress Hills, such as Megacerops (pictured)

In 1968, Morris F. Skinner examined Cope's mandible and Lambe's tooth and concluded that Oreinotherium bilobatum represented a nomen inquirendum (a taxon in need of further investigation) and should be treated as incertae sedis, doubting the usefulness of the generic characters given by Russell. Skinner noted that NMC 6469 was similar to the deciduous premolars of brontotheres, although it did not preserve any unique features that would allow it to be referred to any particular brontothere genus. Skinner nevertheless believed that Oreinotherium was most likely synonymous with one of the brontotheres known from the Cypress Hills. Brontotheres known from the Cypress Hills include Megacerops and the dubious Duchesneodus primitivus, which may represent Duchesneodus, Protitanops, or Notiotitanops.

In 1976, Margery C. Coombs reexamined the fossils and agreed with Skinner that Cope's jaw and Lambe's tooth were best classified as Brontotherioidea incertae sedis, and that Oreinotherium should be treated as a nomen inquirendum. Coombs repeated this assessment in 1998, considering Oreinotherium to "not resemble any known chalicothere" and to probably be a brontothere. In 1993, John E. Storer and Harold N. Bryant commented that Skinner's conclusion was "not necessarily correct" and that the fossil could be chalicothere in origin, but that it was so fragmentary that Oreinotherium should simply be considered a nomen oblitum. In 1997, Malcolm McKenna and Susan K. Bell treated Oreinotherium as a valid genus, and classified it as a brontothere. In a 2004 PhD dissertation, Matthew C. Mihlbachler suggested that Oreinotherium was synonymous with Megacerops, though Oreinotherium or this proposed synonymy was not mentioned in Mihlbachler's subsequent revisions of brontotheres.

== Paleoecology ==
The Cypress Hills Formation was once considered to be Oligocene in age, and to correspond only to the Chadronian land mammal age. In the 1990s, the Chadronian, and thus also the Cypress Hills Formation, was reinterpreted as Late Eocene in age. Biochronological work on mammal fossils from the Cypress Hills Formation in the later 1990s revealed that the deposits represent a continuous period of deposition lasting nearly 30 million years, from the Uintan (Eocene) to Hemingfordian (early Miocene). Oreinotherium was formerly considered Chadronian in age, but these reassessments, and the lack of precise stratigraphic data for the specimens, means that it can no longer be dated more precisely than to the Late Eocene.

Rich fossil faunas are known from the Cypress Hills Formation. The most diverse fauna, the Calf Creek Local Fauna, dates to the Chadronian and comprises a large number of taxa, including over 40 mammal families, three bird families, and 13 reptile families. A large number of amphibian, fish, and plant fossils are also known from the fauna. The paleoclimate must have been much warmer than present-day Saskatchewan. The presence of tortoises, crocodilians, and boid snakes suggests a subtropical climate, without or nearly without freezing temperatures, and the local plants represent taxa from temperate or warm-temperate climates. A range of different environments were probably present, including deciduous forests, open woodland, and shrubby grasslands. Large permanent water bodies can be inferred by the presence of crocodilians, fishes, and aquatic turtles.
