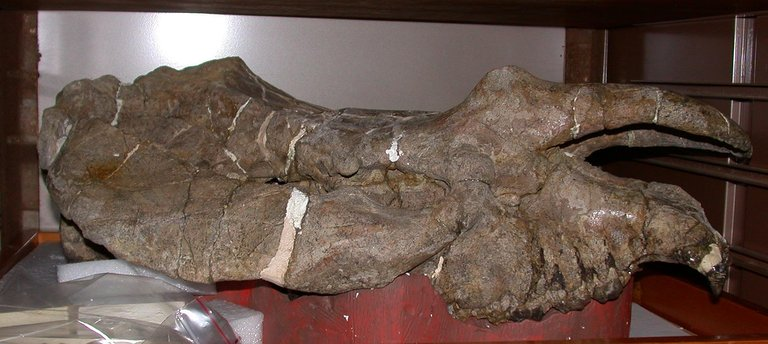
- Type skull (UCMP 126100) of E. clarnoensis

Scientific classification
- Kingdom: Animalia
- Phylum: Chordata
- Class: Mammalia
- Order: Perissodactyla
- Family: †Brontotheriidae
- Tribe: †Brontotheriini
- Subtribe: †Brontotheriina
- Infratribe: †Brontotheriita
- Genus: †Eubrontotherium; Mihlbachler, 2007
- Species: †E. clarnoensis

Binomial name
- †Eubrontotherium clarnoensis Mihlbachler, 2007

= Eubrontotherium =

Eubrontotherium Temporal range: Middle–Late Eocene, 42.7–33.9 Ma

Extinct genus of mammals

Eubrontotherium (lit. 'true thunder beast') is an extinct genus of horned brontothere that lived in North America and East Asia during the Late Eocene. The genus contains a single species, E. clarnoensis, known from fossils found in the Clarno Formation of Oregon and in the Ergilin Dzo Formation of Mongolia. Eubrontotherium fossils in Mongolia are younger in age than those in the United States; it is unclear if this has paleobiogeographical implications since relatively few fossils of the genus are known.

Although it was not the largest animal in its environment on either continent, Eubrontotherium was a large and heavy brontothere, estimated to have weighed over two tonnes. Eubrontotherium had two short horns in front of its eyes, relatively smaller than the horns of its close relatives.

== Research history ==
=== North America ===
==== Hancock Mammal Quarry fossils ====
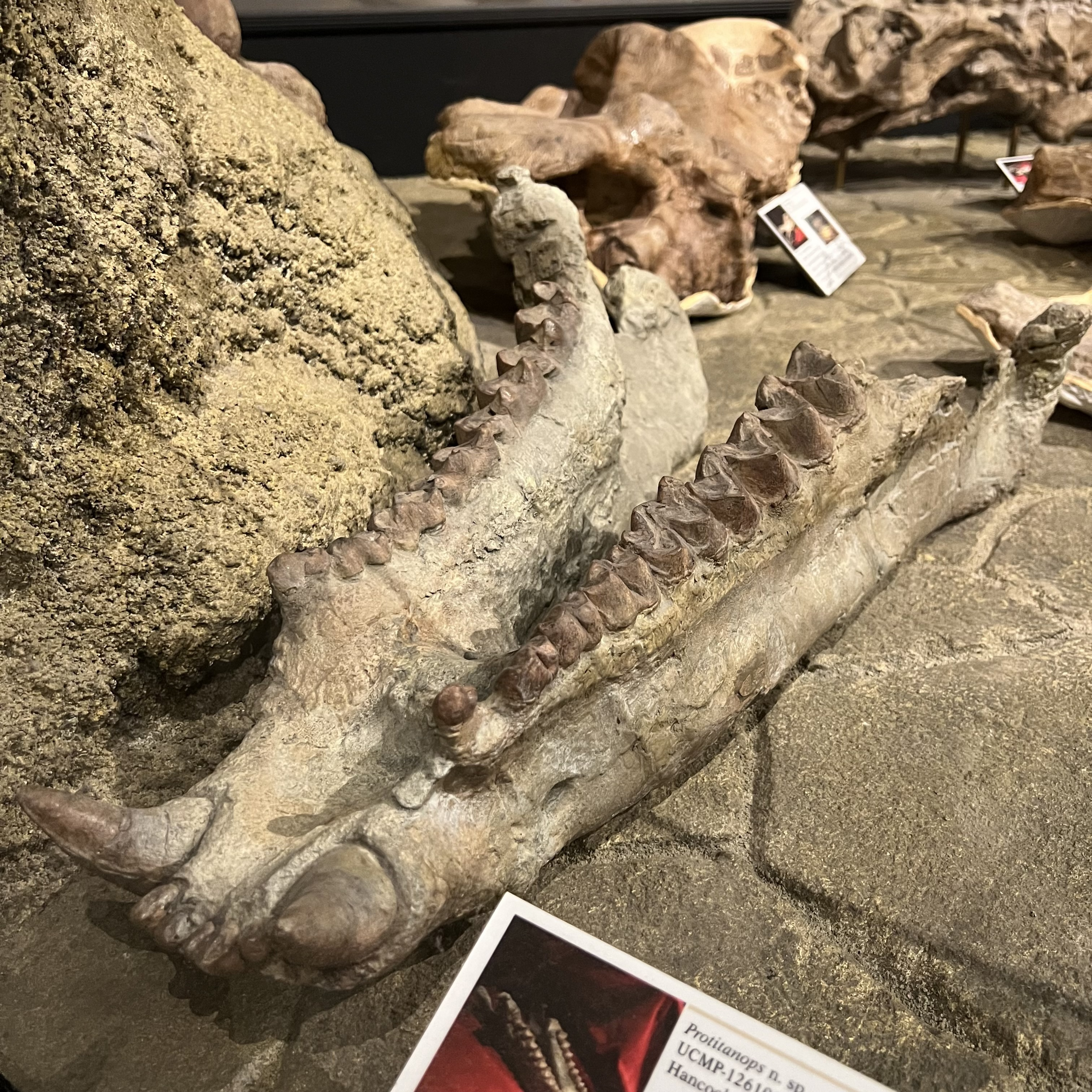
E. clarnoensis mandible from the Hancock Mammal Quarry

North American fossils of Eubrontotherium come from the Hancock Mammal Quarry in the John Day Fossil Beds National Monument, Oregon. Geologically, these fossils are from the Clarno Formation. The quarry was first discovered and excavated by the amateur geologist Lon Hancock in 1956, who had discovered fossil teeth of Hyrachyus at the site. Decades of excavations in the quarry have revealed a diverse Eocene fauna, including several large mammals.

Among the fossils found in the Hancock Mammal Quarry were well-preserved fossils of a large horned brontothere, including two near-complete skulls (UCMP 126100 and UCMP 126101), a complete mandible (UCMP 126102), and several other cranial fossils. It took a long time before these fossils were scientifically described in detail and securely taxonomically identified. In the meantime, the brontothere taxon found in the quarry was informally referred to as the "Clarno brontothere" and was often identified as belonging to the genus Protitanops, although no formal identification as such was published for some time.

The Clarno brontothere was first mentioned in the scientific literature by Bryn J. Mader in 1989. Mader doubted that it belonged to Protitanops but did not explain his reasons for why it could not be referred to that genus. In 1996, C. Bruce Hanson designated the Clarno brontothere as Protitanops sp., citing "only minor differences" when compared to the Protitanops type specimen. Hanson did describe the fossils in detail, noting that a description was "in manuscript for publication elsewhere". No study on the brontothere was published by Hanson. In 2004, Spencer G. Lucas, Scott E. Foss, and Matthew C. Mihlbachler also concluded that the Clarno brontothere was Protitanops, preliminarily referring the fossils to the Protitanops type species, P. curryi. Lucas, Foss, and Mihlbachler noted that a detailed description of the fossils was still needed but identified only two features separating the P. curryi and the Clarno brontothere: the size of the horns and the position of the posterior nares, features that have been found to vary within other brontothere species.

In 2007, Mihlbachler published the first detailed description of the Clarno brontothere fossils and determined that they belonged to a new genus and species, which he named Eubrontotherium clarnoensis. The genus name Eubrontotherium was chosen to allude to the informal term "eubrontotheres", sometimes used for the horned brontothere clade to which Eubrontotherium belongs (Brontotheriita). Etymologically, Eubrontotherium means "true thunder beast", from the Latin prefix eu- ("true") and the Greek βροντή ("thunder") and θηρίον ("beast"). The species name clarnoensis derives from the Clarno Formation. The skull UCMP 126100 was chosen as the type specimen.

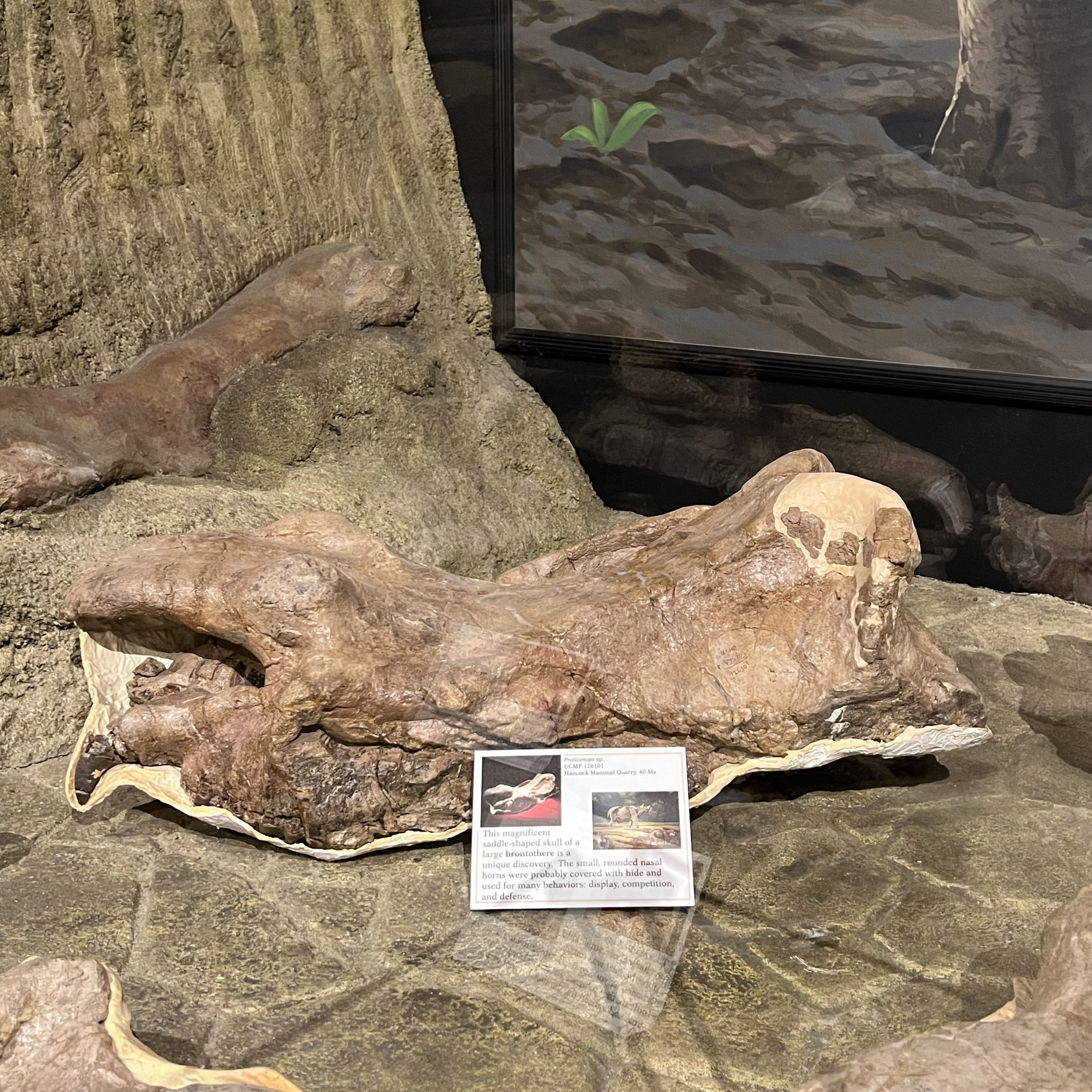
E. clarnoensis skull from the Hancock Mammal Quarry

The naming of the new genus and species was justified through unique features in the Clarno fossils that had previously gone unnoticed. None of the E. clarnoensis skulls have large swellings on their zygomatic arches, a feature seen in Protitanops and several other horned brontotheres. The degree of swelling in other brontotheres may be variable within species, possibly due to sexual dimorphism. In E. clarnoensis, these swellings are absent in both robust and gracile specimens. The only other known "eubrontothere" to lack these swellings are Parabrontops and Parvicornus. Eubrontotherium differs from Parabrontops in having two (and not three) pairs of upper incisors. Eubrontotherium differs from Parvicornus in that its row of incisors is straighter and placed between the canines, whereas that of Parvicornus is arched towards the canines.

==== Possible additional fossils ====
No securely identified Eubrontotherium fossils are known from North America other than the Hancock Mammal Quarry fossils. It is possible that the range of E. clarnoensis also reached California; a fossil palate (LACM/CIT 2143) from the Sespe Formation may belong to either E. clarnoensis or Protitanops curryi, though it does not preserve enough features to distinguish between the two. This palate was originally described as a specimen of Teleodus (Duchesneodus) by Chester Stock in 1938, and was classified as Duchesneodus uintensis by Spencer G. Lucas and Robert M. Schoch in 1989. In 2008, Mihlbachler noted that the presence of a diastema (gap between teeth) between the canines and premolars precludes the palate from being Duchesneodus.

=== Asia ===
In 2008, Mihlbachler identified several brontothere fossils from the Ergilin Dzo Formation of Mongolia as conspecific with E. clarnoensis. These fossils included a flattened skull (PIN 3109-39) and a partial skeleton, including a partial skull and mandible (PIN 3109, with specimen numbers 90–104, 106, 111–116, and 142–232). These fossils were originally described in 1980 by Nataliia Mikhailovna Yanovskaya, who referred them to Metatitan relictus (PIN 3109-90 and 91) and Parabrontops gobiensis (PIN 3109-39). Mihlbachler noted that several cranial and dental features of these fossils precluded Yanovskaya's classifications, notably that all the skulls had two pairs of upper incisors, differing from the three pairs in both Metatitan and Parabrontops.

All of the aforementioned PIN (Paleontological Institute of the Russian Academy of Sciences) fossils were instead found to be consistent with E. clarnoensis, especially in that they shared E. clarnoensis's unique combination of two pairs of upper incisors and the lack of swellings on the zygomatic arches. Mihlbachler thus referred the Ergilin Dzo fossils to E. clarnoensis. Small differences between the Mongolian and North American fossils, such as the horns of the E. clarnoensis type skull appearing to be lower than those of the Mongolian skulls, were attributed to taphonomic effects, in this case due to the North American skull being slightly crushed.

== Description ==
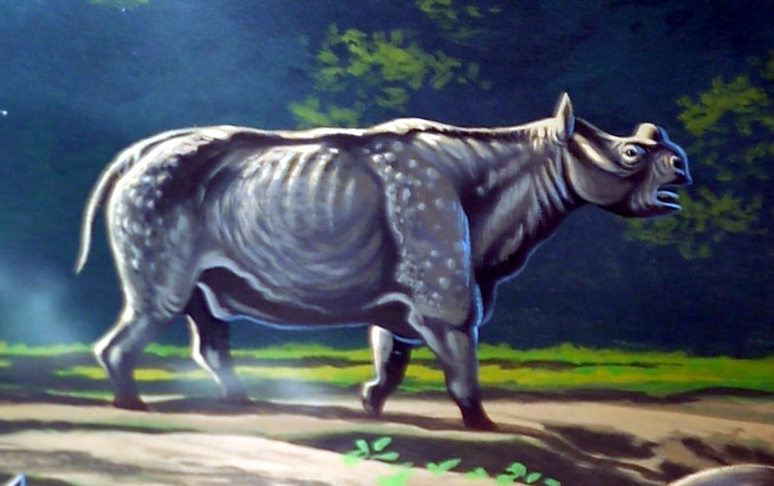
Life restoration of E. clarnoensis

Eubrontotherium was a large brontothere. The type skull UCMP 126100 measures 645 millimetres (25.4 in) long and 580 millimetres (23 in) wide. The second skull referred to the species, UCMP 126101, is 600 millimetres (24 in) wide. In 2023, Oscar Sanisidro, Mihlbachler, and Juan L. Cantalapiedra estimated E. clarnoensis to have weighed 2,285 kilograms (5,038 lb).

=== Skull ===
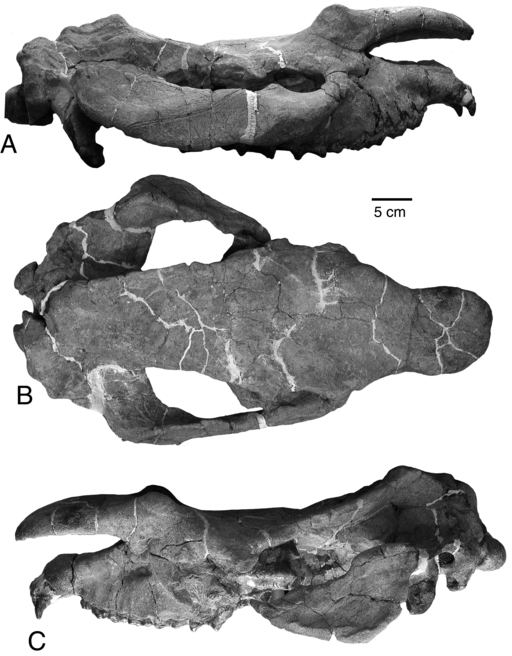

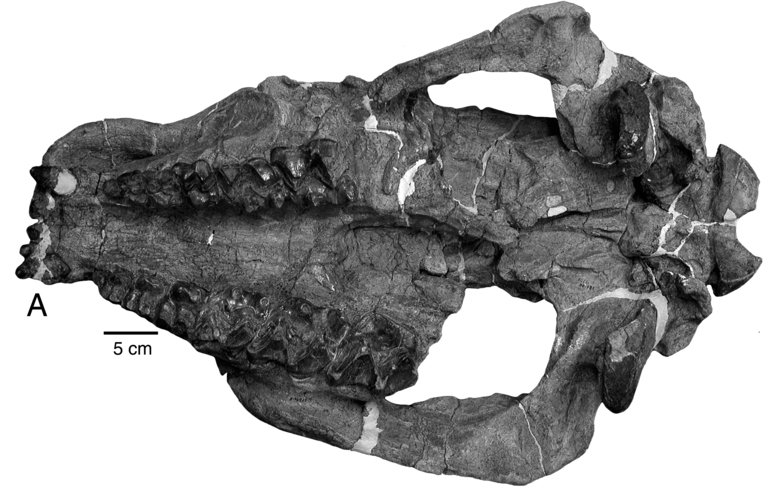
The E. clarnoensis type skull (UCMP 126100) from different angles

Eubrontotherium had a shallow, saddle-shaped skull. The zygomatic arches varied from straight and thin to slightly curved and relatively thick. Regardless of the robustness of the zygomatic arches, no Eubrontotherium skull has any conspicuous swellings on the zygomatic arches, an otherwise common trait in large brontotheres. The nasal process of Eubrontotherium was broad and angled slightly downwards, with a strongly rounded end. The premaxillomaxillary rostrum (the part of the jaw extending below the nasal incision) was thinned towards its front end and curved slightly upwards. Depending on the specimen, the nasal process and the premaxillomaxillary rostrum were either about equally long, or the nasal process was slightly shorter.

Eubrontotherium had a pair of small horns, rising up from the skull slightly in front of the orbits. The horns were slightly elliptical in cross-section at their bases, but more rounded at their ends, and pointed slightly dorsolaterally (upwards and outwards) or anterodorsolaterally (upwards, outwards, and forwards), depending on the specimen. In the known fossils, the horns do not appear to be highly elevated on the skull, though this may in part be due to taphonomic crushing of the skulls. Even accounting for crushing, the horns or the nasal process were not as highly elevated as in some other genera, such as Diplacodon. Horn size varied slightly between individuals, but was similar to the range seen in Duchesneodus. The horns were smaller and less massive than the horns of genera such as Dianotitan, Parabrontops, and Protitanops.

The nasal incision of Eubrontotherium was relatively shallow, extending back to the anterior margin (frontmost part) of the fourth upper premolar. The anterior rim of the orbit (eye socket) was above the first or the second upper molar. The sides of the skull had prominent parasagittal ridges (ridges running lengthwise along the skull), which somewhat constricted the skull's upper surface towards the back. The occiput is not preserved in the type skull (UCMP 126100), and is only partially preserved in UCMP 126101 and PIN 3109-90. The nuchal crest (the posterior edge of the skull) was relatively thick, similar to robust specimens of Duchesneodus and Dianotitan, and thicker than in Protitanops.

=== Dentition ===
E. clarnoensis had the dental formula 2.1.4.33.1.4.3. Eubrontotherium had two pairs of small and globular upper incisors, positioned in a straight row. The reduced number of upper incisors is a trait seen only in certain horned brontotheres, such as Duchesneodus and Megacerops, and distinguishes Eubrontotherium from some more basal genera, such as Parabrontops. Some E. clarnoensis skulls have a short diastema between the upper incisors and canines, while others lack this diastema. Like the incisors, the upper canines were relatively small, similar to their small size in Protitanops and Notiotitanops. There was a long diastema between the canines and upper premolars, about as long as the length of the second upper premolar. The first upper premolar had a complex morphology, and its morphology varies between specimens, a trait seen in several brontothere species. The variability seen in the premolars of E. clarnoensis means that its premolars are not clearly differentiable from those of other brontotheres. The second to fourth upper premolars were almost rectangular in shape and had distinct hypocones (one of the major cusps). The upper molars were typical of derived brontotheres, though have been noted to have rather tall ectolophs (one of the ridges across the tooth), with labial (towards the lips) walls angled towards the tongue.

There were three pairs of lower incisors, lined up in a nearly straight row between the lower canines. The second pair of lower incisors were larger than the first and third pair. Many of the lower incisors had small gaps between them. Like in the upper dentition, there was no diastema between the lower incisors and canines. Also similar to the upper dentition, there was a diastema between the lower canines and premolars slightly longer than the length of the second lower premolar. Of the premolars, only the fourth lower premolar had a metaconid (one of the cusps). The trigonid (shearing part) of the second lower premolar was slightly longer than the tooth's talonid (crushing part). The lower molars were typical of advanced brontotheres and not notably different from those of close relatives of Eubrontotherium. The lower molars had shallow basins, and the third lower molar was noticeably slender.

== Classification ==
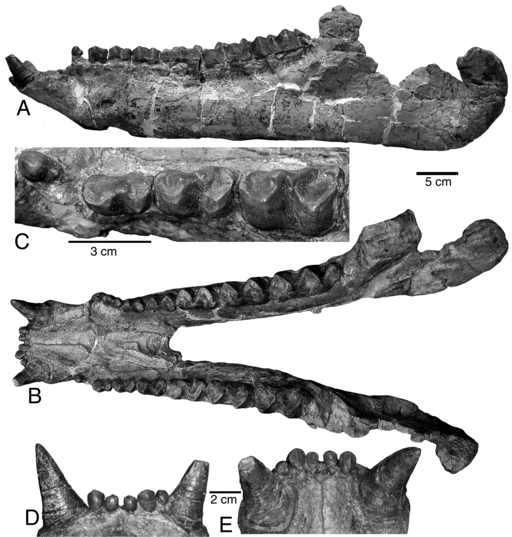
E. clarnoensis mandible (UCMP 126102)

Mihlbachler classified Eubrontotherium in the brontothere infratribe Brontotheriita (the "eubrontotheres"), at the time mostly diagnosed by globular and small upper incisors. Brontotheriita is in turn classified in the subtribe Brontotheriina, which encompasses all horned brontotheres. Mihlbachler performed a phylogenetic analysis as part of the description of Eubrontotherium, and recovered it as a relatively basal eubrontothere. In a 2008 analysis part of a major monograph on brontotheres, Mihlbachler recovered identical relationships within Brontotheriita. Following the description of additional fossils of Protitanops and Parvicornus in 2021, Mihlbachler and Donald Prothero performed a new phylogenetic analysis. The results of the 2021 analysis were broadly similar, though Protitanops was found to be more derived than Eubrontotherium (rather than more basal, as in previous analyses).

Topology A: Mihlbachler (2007)

- Brontotheriita
  - Parabrontops gobiensis
  - Protitanops curryi
  - - Eubrontotherium clarnoensis
    - - Dianotitan lunanensis
      - Duchesneodus uintensis
      - - Megacerops coloradensis
        - Megacerops kuwagatarhinus

Topology B: Mihlbachler & Prothero (2021)

- Brontotheriita
  - Parabrontops gobiensis
  - - Parvicornus occidentalis
    - - Eubrontotherium clarnoensis
      - - Protitanops curryi
        - - Dianotitan lunanensis
          - - Duchesneodus uintensis
            - - Megacerops kuwagatarhinus
              - Megacerops coloradensis

== Paleobiology ==
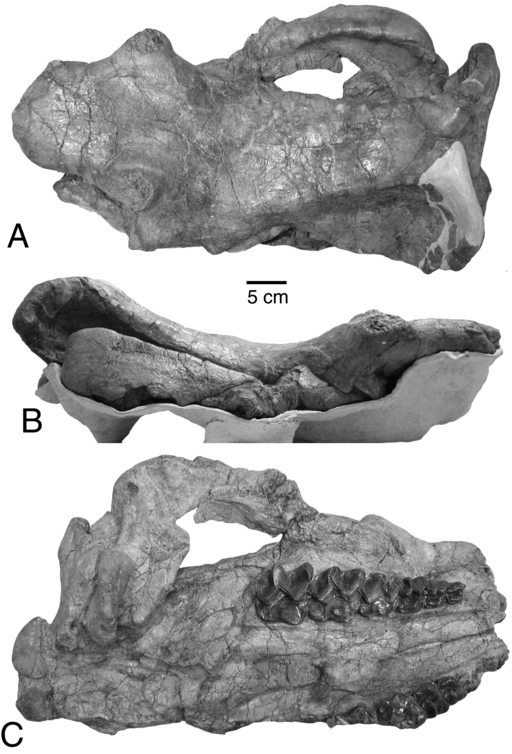
A robust E. clarnoensis skull (UCMP 126101)

Fossils of Eubrontotherium vary in the robustness of the zygomatic arches, and in the size of the canines, features that have been interpreted as sexually dimorphic in other brontothere genera. Comparing the two original skulls from the Hancock Mammal Quarry, UCMP 126101 is more robust than UCMP 126100 and has much thicker and more curved zygomatic arches. The lower canines of the mandible found in the quarry, UCMP 126102, are much larger than the upper canines of UCMP 126100. UCMP 126100 is not from the same individual and its associated mandible is not preserved, but this nevertheless indicates canine size variability in the species.

The size and morphology of the horns notably varies between UCMP 126100 and UCMP 126101. The horns of UCMP 126101 are larger than those of UCMP 126100 and have a rugose surface at their ends, while the horns of UCMP 126100 have smooth surfaces. UCMP 126101 also has a broader and thicker nasal process, and thicker parasagittal ridges. Additionally, UCMP 126101 is more robust than the Asian skull PIN 3109-90, and has a thicker nuchal crest, another possibly sexually dimorphic feature.

== Paleoecology ==
=== Temporal range ===
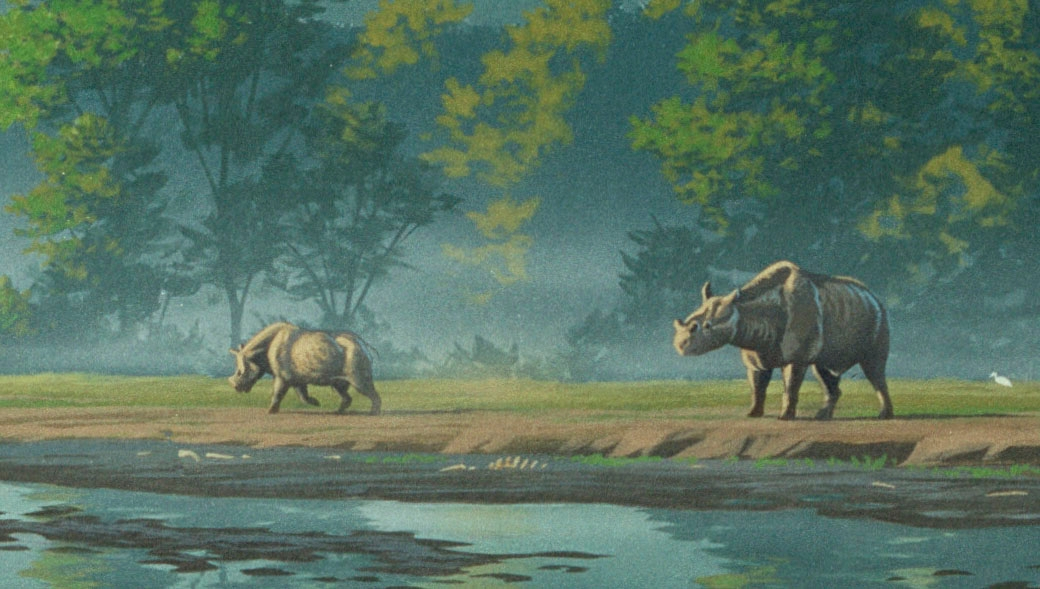
Life restoration of two E. clarnoensis

The Asian fossils referred to E. clarnoensis are from the Ergilin Dzo Formation. The Ergilin Dzo fauna (including Eubrontotherium) is generally all dated to the eponymous Ergilian land mammal age. Mihlbachler dated the Asian E. clarnoensis fossils to the preceding Ulangochuian in 2008, but also conflated the Ulangochuian and Ergilian in the entry for Protembolotherium in his monograph. The Ergilian was formerly considered to be Early Oligocene in age, but has been redated to the Late Eocene; it is now considered to correspond to the last few million years of the Eocene, approximately 37.8–33.9 million years ago.

The timeframe of the North American E. clarnoensis fossils has been disputed due to disputes over the age of the Hancock Mammal Quarry. The quarry has variously been dated to the Uintan, Duchesnean, or Chadronian land mammal ages. In 2004, Lucas, Foss, and Mihlbachler argued that the quarry was late Uintan in age due to the presence of typical Uintan mammals, and because the overlying John Day Formation had been dated to older than 39.5–40 million years. More recent papers consistently date the Hancock Mammal Quarry to the latest Uintan or the Duchesnean; ^{40}Ar/^{39}Ar dating of volcanic tuffs indicate that the fossils at the site were deposited between 42.7 and 39.2 million years ago. The North American E. clarnoensis fossils thus appear to be significantly older than the Asian fossils. Since so few occurrences of E. clarnoensis are known, it is however not certain how long the species was present on either continent.

=== Habitat and contemporary taxa ===
==== Clarno Formation ====
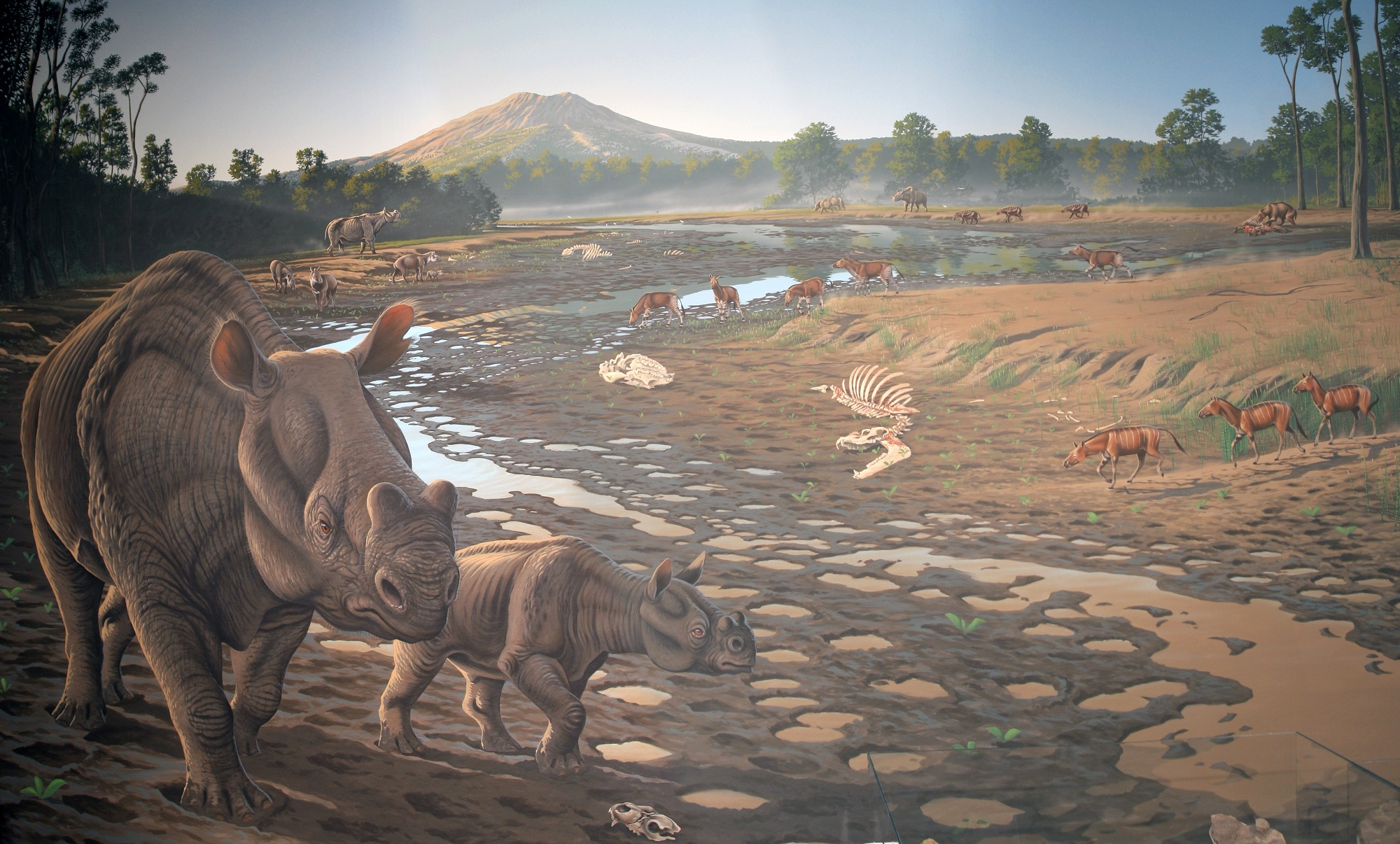
Reconstruction of the environment and some of the mammals found in the Hancock Mammal Quarry in the Clarno Formation. Two E. clarnoensis are depicted in the foreground.

The Hancock Mammal Quarry is a highly productive fossil site. Over 2000 vertebrate fossils have been found, most from large-bodied mammals over 10 kilograms (22 lb). Alongside Eubrontotherium, the most well-represented mammals in the quarry are the amynodont ("swamp rhinoceros") Zaisanamynodon and the rhinoceros Teletaceras. Zaisanamynodon, the largest known amynodont, surpassed Eubrontotherium in size. Rarer mammals found at the site include the helaletid Plesiocolopirus and the agriochoerid Diplobunops. Small mammals are uncommon in the quarry, but include the early horses Epihippus and Haplohippus, and the hyracodont ("running rhinoceros") Hyracodon. Two artiodactyls are known, Achaenodon and Heptacodon. Rodent fossils are also known but unidentified. Predators found in the quarry include an unidentified nimravid ("false saber-toothed cat"), the hyaenodont Hemipsalodon, and the large mesonychid Harpagolestes. In addition to mammals, fossils from fish and amphibians have been found, and a few reptile remains. The reptile fossils include fossils of turtles (including a chelydrid) and crocodilians (including an unidentified alligatoroid).

The Nut Beds of the Clarno Formation, which underly the Hancock Mammal Quarry, are a famous paleobotanical site. The Hancock Mammal Quarry preserves considerably fewer plant fossils than the Nut Beds. All of the Hancock Mammal Quarry plants are angiosperms, a marked shift from the thermophilic plants that are most common in the Nut Beds. This might indicate that the Hancock Mammal Quarry fossils were deposited at a cooler and drier time. The fossils are believed to have been deposited in a point bar of a river.

==== Ergilin Dzo Formation ====
The Ergilin Dzo Formation is also a famously productive geological formation, from which over a hundred species of fossil vertebrates have been identified, including mammals, reptiles, birds, amphibians, and fish. The mammal fauna from the Ergilin Dzo Formation defines the type fauna of the Ergilian land mammal age. In many ways, this was a transitional fauna which included representatives of several groups known from earlier land mammal ages but also the first representatives of groups that would become dominant in the quite different faunas of the Oligocene. Over 80 species of mammals are known from the formation. With over 30 species, perissodactyls are the most diverse mammal group in the assemblage and they are interpreted as a dominant group in the Ergilian. Brontotheres and amynodonts were particularly dominant perissodactyl groups. Several other brontotheres are known from the Ergilin Dzo Formation, including Embolotherium and Protembolotherium. Amynodonts were represented by several genera, including Cadurcodon, Hypsamynodon, cf. Zaisanamynodon, and others. Other perissodactyls include chalicotherioids (Eomoropus and Schizotherium), eggysodonts (cf. Allacerops), rhinoceroses (Ronzotherium), hyracodonts (Ardynia and Prohyracodon), paraceratheres (Juxia and Urtinotherium), deperetellids (Deperetella and cf. Teleolophus), and helaletids (Paracolodon).

Artiodactyls were represented by anthracotheres (cf. Bothriodon), entelodonts (Brachyhyops and Entelodon), and ruminants (Eumeryx, Gobiomeryx, Lophiomeryx, Miomeryx, and Praetragulus). Predatory mammals included carnivorans (nimravids Nimravus and Eofelis, indeterminate amphicyonids, as well as Asiavorator and Alagtsavbaatar), and hyaenodonts (several species of Hyaenodon and indeterminate proviverrines). Mesonychids were also present but rare, and included Metahapalodectes and Mongolestes. Several groups of smaller mammals were present, including anagalids, changlelestids, erinaceids, didymoconids, lagomorphs, pantolestids, rodents, and soricids. Rodents were especially diverse. Most of the bird fossils are unidentified beyond the family level, but belong to at least eleven species, in five different orders. Two fish genera have been identified, and only one indeterminate amphibian (a salamander) is known. Reptiles included several species of turtles, two species of lizards, and an unidentified crocodyliform.

The paleoenvironment of the Ergilin Dzo Formation has been interpreted as a relatively closed, warm, and humid area since most of the herbivorous animals having low-crowned cheek teeth. Sedimentary analyses suggest the Ergilin Dzo Formation was a floodplain environment with a braided stream network formed by fluvial systems.
