= Dianotitan =

Dianotitan Temporal range: Middle Eocene
- Drawing of the type skull of D. lunanensis (VM 547)

Scientific classification
- Kingdom: Animalia
- Phylum: Chordata
- Class: Mammalia
- Order: Perissodactyla
- Family: †Brontotheriidae
- Subfamily: †Brontotheriinae
- Tribe: †Brontotheriini
- Subtribe: †Brontotheriina
- Infratribe: †Brontotheriita
- Genus: †Dianotitan; Zhou, Chang, & Ting, 1974
- Species: †D. lunanensis

Binomial name
- †Dianotitan lunanensis (Zhou & Hu, 1959) [originally Parabrontops]

Synonyms
- Parabrontops lunanensis Zhou & Hu, 1959

Extinct genus of mammals

Dianotitan (lit. 'Dian titan') is an extinct genus of horned brontothere that lived in East Asia during the Middle Eocene. The genus contains a single species, D. lunanensis, known from skulls found in the Lumeiyi Formation of Yunnan, China.

Dianotitan was a large brontothere, surpassing a tonne in weight, and had two small to medium-sized horns, roughly ovoid in shape, that rose up vertically above and in front of the eyes. Dianotitan is also noted for its relatively more brachycephalic (short and broad) head compared to its close relatives. Phylogenetics suggest that Dianotitan descended from North American ancestors that migrated to East Asia across Beringia, since all of its closest known relatives, both more basal and more derived, are known from fossils found in North America.

== Research history ==
Top view of VM 547

Dianotitan lunanensis was originally described as Parabrontops lunanensis, by Zhou Mingzhen and Hu Chengzhi in 1959. The new species was based on a nearly complete skull (VM 547), found at Anjetsen in Lunan, Yunnan, China. The skull was found in what was then referred to as the Upper Lunan beds, now considered to be part of the Lumeiyi Formation. Zhou and Hu diagnosed P. lunanensis as having expanded zygomatic arches, reduced upper incisors, well-developed horns, and a short postcanine diastema (short gap between the canines and premolars). In their original description, Zhou and Hu compared P. lunanensis only to Parabrontops gobiensis, from which they differentiated the new species by its smaller size, smaller horns, broader skull, reduced number of incisors, shorter nasal with a more narrow anterior end, and relatively smaller premolars.

In 1974, Zhou, Chang Yu-Ping, and Ting Su-Yin reclassified P. lunanensis in the new genus Dianotitan. Zhou, Chang, and Ting justified the new genus by additional characteristics that distinguished D. lunanensis from P. gobiensis, including D. lunanensis having a distinctly more brachycephalic (short and broad) skull, based on a series of cranial indices, and different cheek tooth proportions.

=== 2008 re-examination ===
In a 2008 monograph, Matthew C. Mihlbachler referred another partial skull to D. lunanensis, VM 573, also found in the Lumeiyi Formation. Mihlbachler recognized Dianotitan as a distinct genus, though noted that few of the features cited by Zhou and Hu in 1959, and Zhou, Chang, and Ting in 1974, were taxonomically significant. As an example, D. lunanensis and P. gobiensis appear to have been about the same size; the D. lunanensis skulls differ from those assigned to P. gobiensis only by a few centimeters. The nasal of the P. gobiensis type skull is heavily reconstructed with plaster, and the supposedly shorter nasal of D. lunanensis can thus not be reliably compared to it.

Mihlbachler noted that actual, distinctive features of Dianotitan when compared to Parabrontops included the more brachycephalic skull, due to more expanded zygomatic arches, and the loss of one pair of incisors. Mihlbachler further noted that Dianotitan shares a number of features only with the more derived genera Duchesneodus and Megacerops, such as its reduced number of upper incisors, conspicuous lateral swellings on the zygomatic arches, and an insignificant postcanine diastema. Dianotitan is distinguished from Duchesneodus by lacking a conspicuous dome on its skull, and from Megacerops by its longer nasal incision, and lower and more vertical horns, which are positioned further back on the skull.

== Description ==
Dianotitan was a large brontothere. In 2023, Oscar Sanisidro, Mihlbachler, and Juan L. Cantalapiedra estimated D. lunanensis to have weighed 1,516.4 kilograms (3,343 lb).

=== Skull ===
Dianotitan had a saddle-shaped skull. The zygomatic arches were strong, deep, and weakly curved, with conspicuous lateral swellings. The nasal process of Dianotitan was broad and unelevated, and either horizontal or slightly downturned, depending on the specimen. The nasal process was strongly rounded anteriorly, and had thickened and shallow lateral walls. The premaxillomaxillary rostrum (the part of the jaw extending below the nasal incision) of Dianotitan curved slightly upwards, and deepened posteriorly (i.e. in the direction of the rest of the skull).

Dianotitan had a pair of small to medium-sized horns, roughly ovoid in shape (i.e. somewhat egg-shaped). The horns were positioned quite low on the skull, and rose up relatively vertically, above and slightly in front of the orbits (eye sockets). The horns of VM 547 are massive, and rounded in cross-section, more round than the cross-sections of horns in genera such as Protitanops and Parabrontops. The horns of VM 573 were smaller than those of VM 547, and slightly more elliptical in cross-section.

The nasal incision of Dianotitan was relatively shallow, extending back to the anterior margin (frontmost part) of the fourth upper premolar. The anterior rim of the orbit was above the first upper molar. The sides of the skull had prominent parasagittal ridges (ridges running lengthwise along the skull), which remained relatively widely separated throughout their entire length. The occiput of Dianotitan was similar to that of Megacerops and Duchesneodus, and was slightly tilted backwards. The nuchal crest (the posterior edge of the skull) of VM 547 was concave, and very thick and rugose, whereas it was much thinner in VM 573. This variation is similar to the range of variation also seen in Megacerops and Duchesneodus.

=== Dentition ===
Dianotitan had the upper dental formula 2.1.4.3. There were only two pairs of upper incisors, a trait Dianotitan shares with several closely related brontotheres. The incisors were small, and positioned in a straight row, slightly in front of the canines. Neither of the known Dianotitan skulls preserve the canines, but the alveoli (tooth sockets) indicate that the canines were quite small. The canines and premolars were separated by a very short diastema, less than a centimeter long. The first pair of premolars had a complex morphology, and the second to fourth pairs of premolars had distinct hypocones (one of the cusps). The molars of Dianotitan had tall and lingually angled ectolophs, with weak labial ribs. The lingual ectoloph enamel was thinned, with wedge-shaped metacones and paracones.

== Classification ==
In 1997, Malcolm McKenna and Susan K. Bell placed Dianotitan (and Parabrontops, among several other genera) in the subfamily "Brontopinae". Mihlbachler established a new internal taxonomy of brontotheres in his 2008 monograph. In Mihlbachler's 2008 phylogenetic analysis, and in subsequent analyses, Dianotitan has been recovered as a member of the infratribe Brontotheriita ("eubrontotheres"), in the subtribe Brontotheriina (the horned brontotheres).

The cladograms below shows the primary strict reduced consensus tree from Mihlbachler's 2008 analysis, collapsed to show only Brontotheriita, and the reduced strict consensus from a 2021 analysis by Mihlbachler and Donald Prothero:

Topology A: Mihlbachler (2008)

- Brontotheriita
  - Parabrontops gobiensis
  - Protitanops curryi
  - - Eubrontotherium clarnoensis
    - - Dianotitan lunanensis
      - Duchesneodus uintensis
      - - Megacerops coloradensis
        - Megacerops kuwagatarhinus

Topology B: Mihlbachler & Prothero (2021)

- Brontotheriita
  - Parabrontops gobiensis
  - - Parvicornus occidentalis
    - - Eubrontotherium clarnoensis
      - - Protitanops curryi
        - - Dianotitan lunanensis
          - - Duchesneodus uintensis
            - - Megacerops kuwagatarhinus
              - Megacerops coloradensis

== Paleoecology ==
The precise age of the Lumeiyi Formation is not resolved more specifically than Middle Eocene, since the local fauna includes animals characteristic of both the Irdinmanhan and Sharamurunian land mammal ages. Dianotitan is believed to have descended from an immigrant population of North American horned brontotheres; the closest known relatives of Dianotitan, both more derived (Duchesneodus, Megacerops) and more basal (Protitanops), are all known from fossils found in North America.

The paleoenvironment of southern China, including what is today Yunnan, during the Eocene was probably warmer and moister than in northern China. Dianotitan is known from the upper part of the Lumeiyi Formation, which preserves fossils of a diverse mammal fauna. Co-occurring perissodactyls included other brontotheres (including fossils dubiously referred to Rhinotitan), lophialetids, deperetellids, hyracodonts, amynodonts, and paraceratheres. Artiodactyls were represented by both anthracotheres and entelodonts. Carnivorous mammals included both hyaenodonts (Orienspterodon) and carnivorans (Chailicyon).
