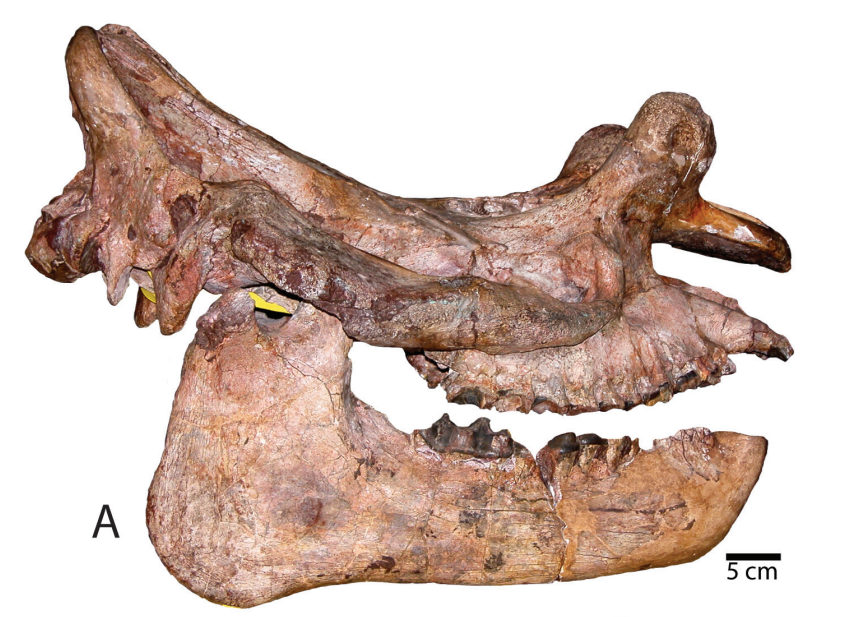
- Type skull (LACM/CIT 1854) of P. curryi

Scientific classification
- Kingdom: Animalia
- Phylum: Chordata
- Class: Mammalia
- Infraclass: Placentalia
- Order: Perissodactyla
- Family: †Brontotheriidae
- Tribe: †Brontotheriini
- Subtribe: †Brontotheriina
- Infratribe: †Brontotheriita
- Genus: †Protitanops; Stock, 1936
- Species: †P. curryi

Binomial name
- †Protitanops curryi Stock, 1936

Synonyms
- Menodus bakeri? Stovall, 1948

= Protitanops =

Protitanops Temporal range: Late Eocene (middle Duchesnean), 37.68–37.15 Ma

Extinct genus of mammals

Protitanops (lit. 'before titanic face', in reference to Titanops (Note: The genus Titanops is now considered a synonym of Megacerops.)) is an extinct genus of horned brontothere that lived in North America during the Late Eocene, in the Duchesnean land mammal age. The genus contains a single species, P. curryi, known from fossils found in California, Texas, and Chihuahua.

Protitanops was a large and heavy animal, estimated to have stood about 2.4 meters (7 ft 10 in) tall at the shoulder and to have weighed over two tonnes. The skull was broad and saddle-shaped, with large zygomatic arches, fused facial bones, and short and bulbous, knob-like horns. Protitanops was broadly similar to the better known Megacerops, but distinguished by its smaller size, smaller horns, and retention of several primitive features, such as its smaller incisors and canines, and the somewhat flattened upper surface of its skull.

== Research history ==
=== Type specimen and further discoveries ===
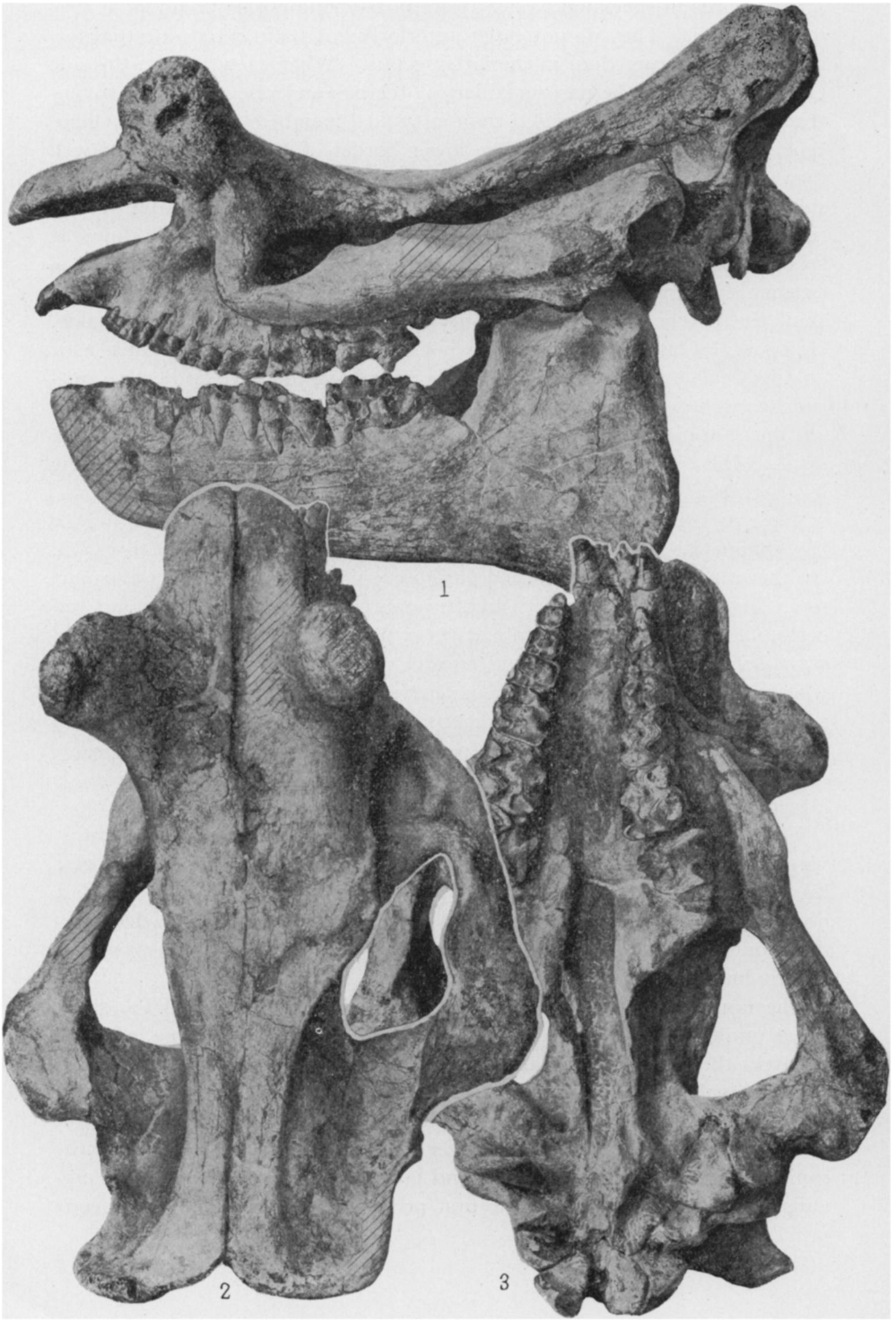
Chester Stock's original figures of the P. curryi type skull (LACM/CIT 1854)

Protitanops curryi was described by Chester Stock in 1936, based on a well-preserved brontothere skull and mandible (LACM/CIT 1854) found in the Lower Red Beds of the Late Eocene Titus Canyon Formation in the Grapevine Mountains of California. The skull was found in 1934 by the geologist H. Donald Curry, at the time a ranger of Death Valley National Park, in which the fossil locality is located. The Protitanops skull was the first mammal fossil found in the park. Stock determined the skull to be intermediate in size between that of Protitanotherium emarginatum and Brontops robustus. Brontops has since been determined to be a synonym of the genus Megacerops. Stock assessed the skull as clearly from a larger and heavier animal than most other horned brontotheres known from North America at the time, such as Protitanotherium, Eotitanotherium, and Teleodus, though smaller and not as robust as Brontops. The genera Eotitanotherium and Teleodus as used by Stock correspond to the currently recognized genera Diplacodon and Duchesneodus, respectively.

Stock found LACM/CIT 1854 to be similar to the skulls of brontotheres from the White River Formation (e.g. Megacerops) in a number of features, including the dentition, the overall appearance of the skull, and the two frontonasal protuberances (horns) and their shape. Several features indicated that Protitanops was a slightly more primitive animal, such as its flattened parietal roof (the upper surface of the skull), which is convex in Megacerops, and smaller canines and incisors. Stock thus chose to name a new genus and species based on the skull. The genus name Protitanops combines the Latin prefix pro- (various meanings, including "before", "in front of", and "preceding") with the genus name Titanops (now considered a synonym of Megacerops). The name Titanops itself means "titanic face", from Ancient Greek Τιτάν (titan) and ὤψ (face). (Note: Titanops has also been interpreted as "resembling Titanotherium", as in "having the face of Titan(otherium)". Titanotherium is also considered a synonym of Megacerops.) The species name curryi honors Curry, the discoverer of the skull.

Other fossils were sometimes referred to Protitanops over the course of the 20th century. Stock described an additional brontothere skull (LACM/CIT 2007) from the Titus Canyon Formation in 1936, which may belong to P. curryi but is too incomplete to identify with a genus and species. In 1996, C. Bruce Hanson suggested that brontothere fossils from the Clarno Formation in Oregon could belong to Protitanops. The Clarno Formation brontothere has since been identified as a new genus, Eubrontotherium. LACM/CIT 2143, a fossil palate from the Sespe Formation in California, was classified as Teleodus (Duchesneodus) by Stock in 1938, and maintained as Duchesneodus uintensis by Spencer G. Lucas and Robert M. Schoch in 1989. This palate is consistent with both P. curryi and Eubrontotherium clarnoensis, and can thus not be securely classified. In 1989 and 1998, Bryn J. Mader restricted P. curryi to only the type skull. In a 2008 monograph on brontotheres, Matthew C. Mihlbachler similarly considered the genus and species to be securely known only from the type skull.

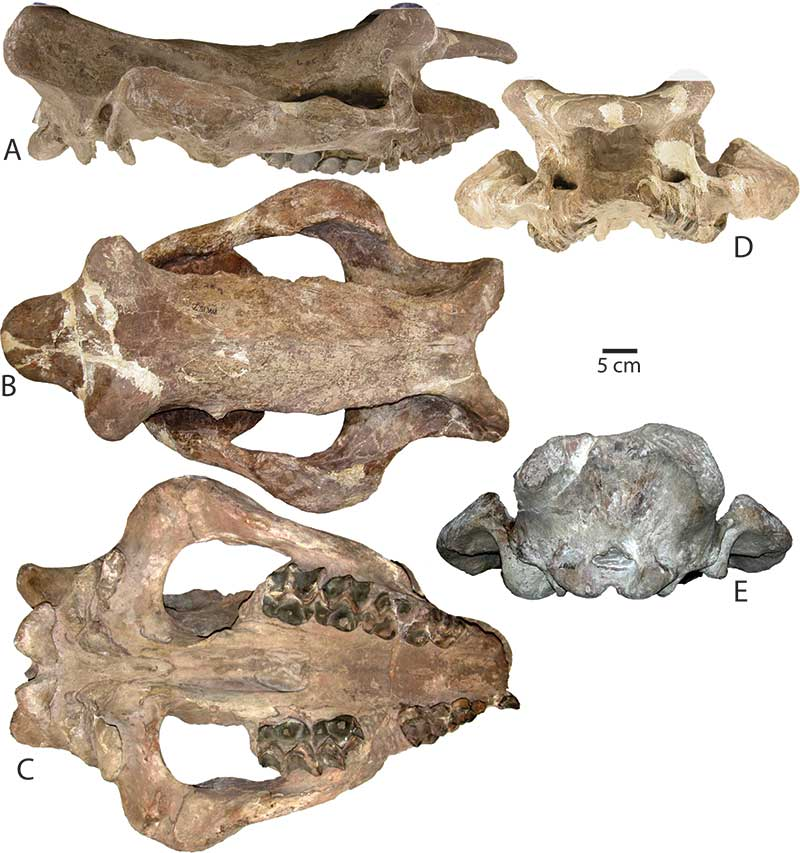
Skull of P. curryi (FMNH PM 157) from Chambers Tuff, Texas

In 2021, Mihlbachler and Donald Prothero identified a large number of skulls and jaws found in Texas as P. curryi, the first confidently identified fossils of Protitanops other than the type specimen. Some of these fossils had been described previously, but referred to the dubious brontothere species Menodus bakeri. Mihlbachler and Prothero further designated M. bakeri as a likely junior synonym of P. curryi. The fossils greatly expanded knowledge of both the anatomy and phylogenetic position of Protitanops, as well as its ontogeny since the sample included juvenile specimens. The fossils also extended the known geographical range of Protitanops further south and east. The Texan fossils were found in Chambers Tuff and in the Lower Chisos Formation in Brewster County. Mihlbachler and Prothero also identified a partial skull (IGM 65-29) previously referred to ?Brontops cf. brachycephalus, found in the Prietos Formation near Ojinaga, Chihuahua in northern Mexico, as P. curryi.

=== Possible additional fossils ===
Mihlbachler and Prothero noted that an undescribed brontothere skull in the collections of the Paleontological Institute of the Russian Academy of Sciences (PIN), found in the Late Eocene Ergilin Dzo Formation of Mongolia, bears close resemblance to P. curryi but that further analysis of this skull and other specimens in the PIN collection is needed. Some brontothere species are known from both North America and Asia, meaning that a Mongolian occurrence of Protitanops would not be impossible, though it would significantly expand the known range of the genus.

In 2008, Mihlbachler found P. curryi difficult to differentiate from the more fragmentarily known Notiotitanops mississippiensis from Mississippi. Mihlbachler noted that the nasal incision of P. curryi is longer, and its orbits (eye sockets) are placed further back, but that further fossils could indicate morphological overlap with N. mississippiensis. N. mississippiensis was named in 1942, and would in the case of synonymy be a junior synonym of P. curryi. After the description of additional P. curryi fossils in 2021, Mihlbachler and Prothero wrote that the aforementioned features appeared to indicate Notiotitanops as a distinct genus, more similar to Megacerops than to Protitanops.

Fossils from the Sespe Formation in California assigned to the dubious species Teleodus (Duchesneodus) californicus by Stock in 1935 may belong to P. curryi, or possibly N. mississippiensis. Mihlbachler and Prothero considered the T. californicus fossils to be too poorly preserved to determine the species.

== Description ==
Protitanops was a large and heavy brontothere. Protitanops is currently known only from cranial material, e.g. skulls and jaws. The type skull of P. curryi is 697 millimetres (27.4 in) long and 486 millimetres (19.1 in) wide at the widest point of the zygomatic arches. The type specimen of P. curryi probably stood about 2.4 meters (7 ft 10 in) tall at the shoulder. In 2023, Oscar Sanisidro, Mihlbachler, and Juan L. Cantalapiedra estimated P. curryi to have weighed 2,361 kilograms (5,205 lb).

=== Skull ===
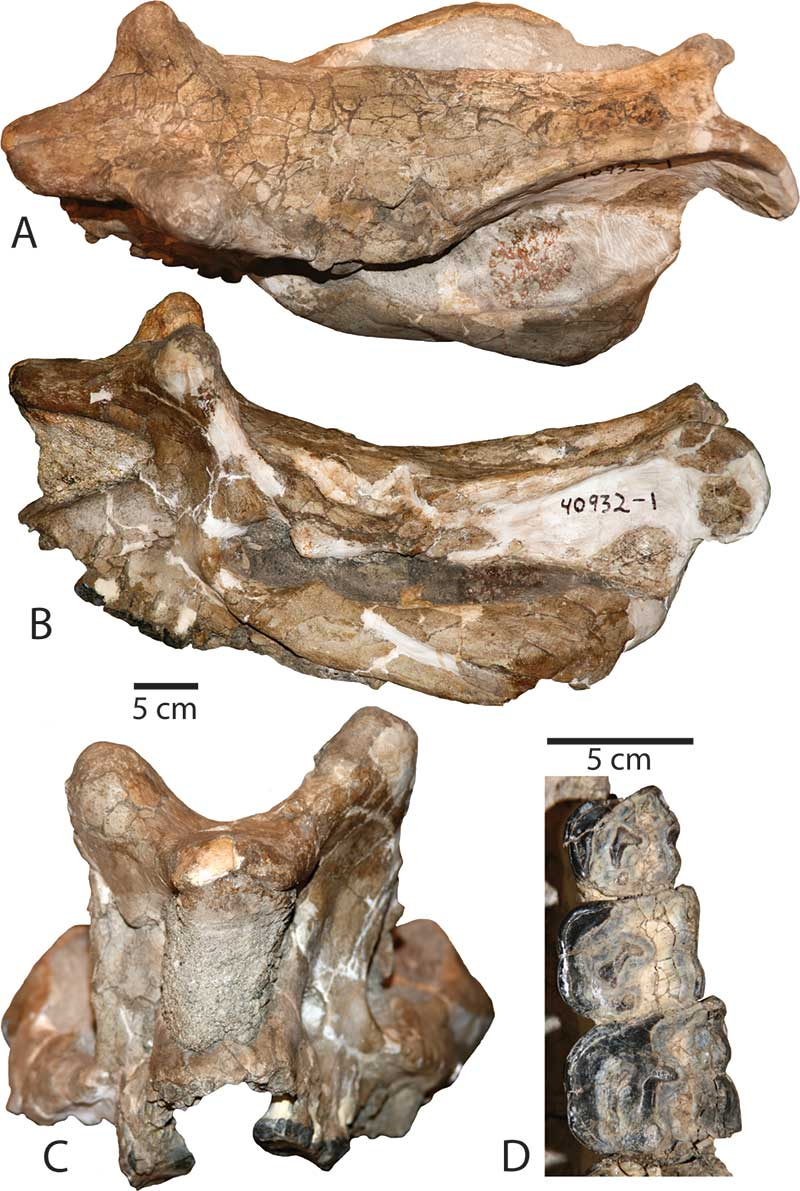
Skull of P. curryi (TMM 40932-1) from the Lower Chisos Formation in Texas

Protitanops had a brachycephalic (short and broad) and strongly saddle-shaped skull, though the upper surface was somewhat flattened. The zygomatic arches were wide and with large swellings, and had a somewhat curved appearance. The arches were historically erroneously interpreted as nearly straight, based on a plaster reconstruction of one of the arches in the type specimen. The outwards-pointing direction of the zygomatic arches gave the skull a somewhat bow-like shape. The bones of the facial area of adult Protitanops, i.e. the frontals, nasals, premaxillae, and maxillae, were entirely fused together to such an extent that no sutures can be seen. The nasal process was broad and angled slightly downwards at its end. The premaxillomaxillary rostrum (the part of the jaw extending below the nasal incision) of Protitanops curved slightly upwards. The nasal process and the premaxillomaxillary rostrum were about equally wide and long.

Protitanops had bulbous, large, and relatively short knob-like horns that rose up from the skull slightly in front of the orbits. The horns were oval in cross-section, pointed slightly forwards and outwards, and did not rise up very far above the orbits. The horns were relatively larger and wider than in more primitive genera, such as Protitanotherium, but not as large as in Megacerops. Fossil horns have a roughened surface. Adult P. curryi horns measure between 80–140 millimetres (3.1–5.5 in).

Protitanops had a shallow nasal incision, which extended to the anterior margin (frontmost part) of the third upper premolar. The anterior rim of the orbit was directly above the first upper molar. The position of the orbit varied slightly between specimens, a common intraspecifically variable feature in brontotheres. Relative to the dentition, the orbits of Protitanops were positioned further forward on the skull than those of Eubrontotherium, further back than in Notiotitanops, and in a similar position to some specimens of Duchesneodus. The sides of the skull had prominent parasagittal ridges (ridges running lengthwise along the skull), which constricted the skull's upper surface towards the back. The degree of constriction varied somewhat between specimens. The occiput was large and robust, but not nearly as massive as in Megacerops. The nuchal crest (the posterior edge of the skull) varies in morphology between specimens; in some P. curryi, the nuchal crest was thin and smooth, and in others it was thick and rugose.

=== Dentition ===
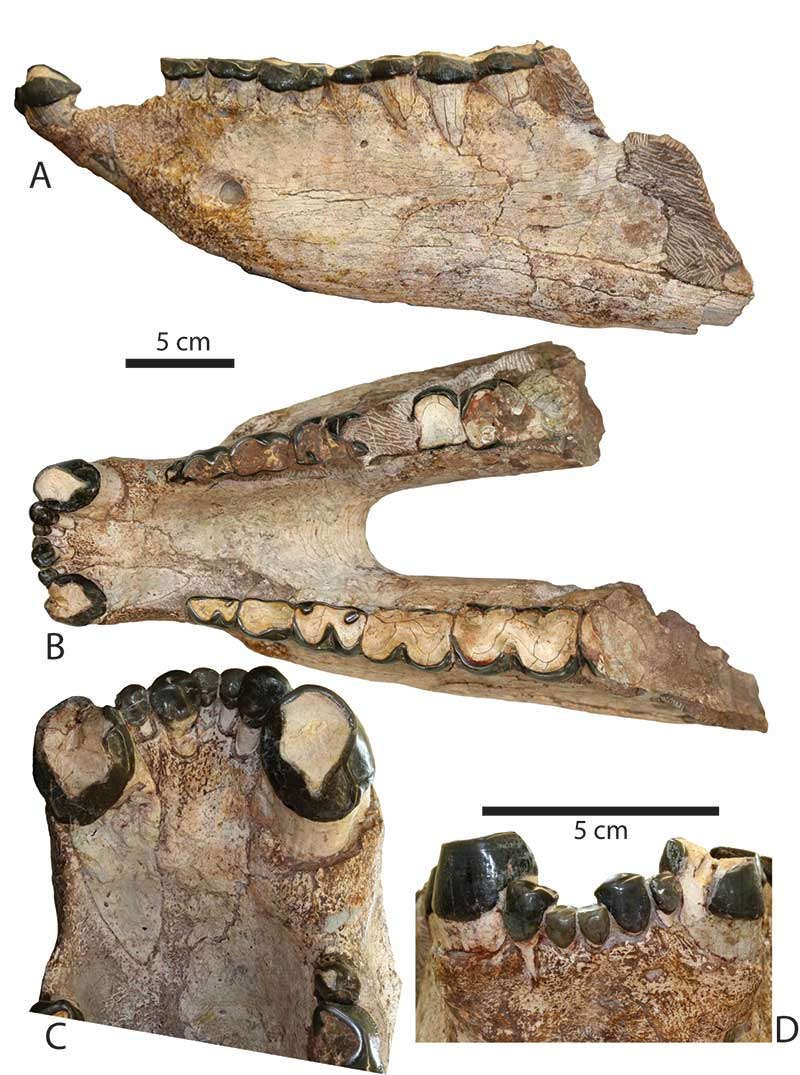
Mandible of P. curryi (TMM 45805-1) from Chambers Tuff

P. curryi had the dental formula 2.1.4.33.1.4.3. Protitanops had two pairs of small and globular upper incisors, positioned in a straight row. The reduced number of upper incisors is a trait seen only in certain horned brontotheres, shared with Eubrontotherium, Dianotitan, Duchesneodus, Megacerops, and Notiotitanops. There was no diastema (gap) between the upper incisors and canines. Like the incisors, the canines were relatively small. There was a long diastema between the canines and upper premolars, about as long as the length of the second upper premolar. This diastema is a relatively primitive trait; among the aforementioned genera, Protitanops shares this diastema only with Eubrontotherium and Notiotitanops. The first premolar was much smaller than the other premolars, and had a complex morphology, with two labial (towards the lips) cusps (metacone and paracone). The second premolar had a distinct metacone, and the third and fourth premolars had a roughly rectangular outline, with distinct hypocones (another cusp). The upper molars were characteristically brontothere and have no diagnostic features specific only to Protitanops; they had weak labial ribs and tall ectolophs (outer ridges) with thin enamel.

There were three pairs of lower incisors, which formed a subtle arch between the lower canines. The lower incisor row was similar (but slightly more arched) than in Eubrontotherium, and less arched than in Parvicornus. The second pair of lower incisors were the largest, whereas the first and third pair were small. Like in the upper dentition there was no diastema between the lower incisors and canines. Also similar to the upper dentition, there was a diastema between the lower canine and premolars slightly longer than the length of the second lower premolar. The lower cheek teeth are poorly preserved in all known specimens of P. curryi. The lower premolars and molars do not appear to be noticeably different from the lower cheek teeth of close relatives, such as Duchesneodus, Eubrontotherium, and Parvicornus.

== Classification ==
In his 2008 monograph, Mihlbachler classified Protitanops in the brontothere infratribe Brontotheriita, in the subtribe Brontotheriina (the horned brontotheres). Brontotheriita is characterized by an unelevated nasal process, and several dental features seen in Protitanops. Several features characterize Brontotheriina, most notably the presence of horns (restricted to this subtribe), but also the saddle-shaped skulls and relatively straight zygomatic arches.

Mihlbachler initially recovered Protitanops and Parabrontops as the basalmost taxa in the infratribe. Following the description of additional fossils in 2021, Mihlbachler and Prothero performed a new phylogenetic analysis, in which Protitanops was recovered in a slightly more derived position, more derived than Eubrontotherium but more basal than Dianotitan. The cladograms below show the results of both analyses, limited to the Brontotheriita infratribe:

Topology A: Mihlbachler (2008)

- Brontotheriita
  - Parabrontops gobiensis
  - Protitanops curryi
  - - Eubrontotherium clarnoensis
    - - Dianotitan lunanensis
      - Duchesneodus uintensis
      - - Megacerops coloradensis
        - Megacerops kuwagatarhinus

Topology B: Mihlbachler & Prothero (2021)

- Brontotheriita
  - Parabrontops gobiensis
  - - Parvicornus occidentalis
    - - Eubrontotherium clarnoensis
      - - Protitanops curryi
        - - Dianotitan lunanensis
          - - Duchesneodus uintensis
            - - Megacerops kuwagatarhinus
              - Megacerops coloradensis

== Paleobiology ==
=== Ontogeny ===
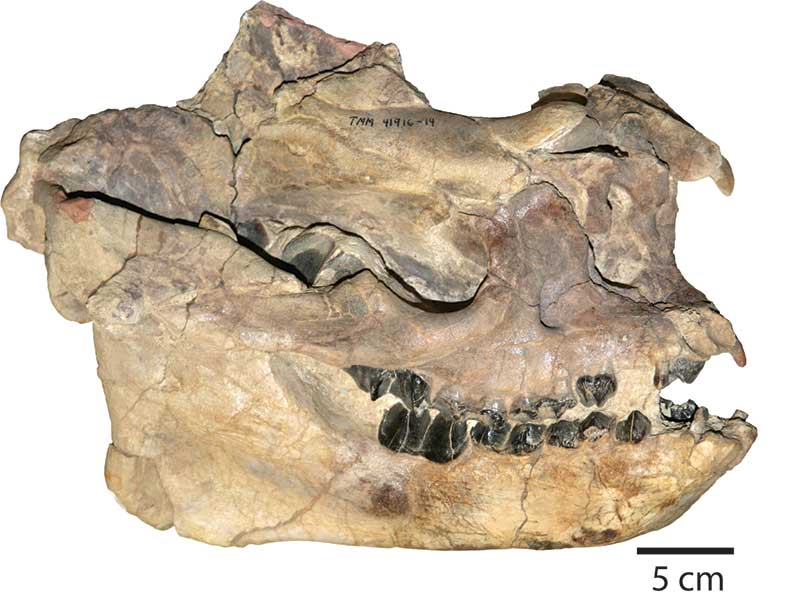
Skull of a juvenile P. curryi (TMM 41916-14), from the Lower Chisos Formation

The description of juvenile specimens of P. curryi in 2021 allowed insights into the ontogeny of the genus. The size and ossification of the horns of P. curryi varied with age, with younger specimens having shorter and less ossified horns. In some younger specimens, the facial bones were not yet entirely fused, as they are in adults, indicated by visible sutures. The large swellings seen in the zygomatic arches of adult P. curryi are not seen in juvenile specimens, indicating that this feature developed with age.

=== Sexual dimorphism ===
It is possible that overall robustness and horn size were sexual dimorphic features in Protitanops. Adult skulls can be divided into more and less robust specimens. In known less robust specimens, the horns are too poorly preserved to judge whether they were variable. The degree of curvature and swelling in the zygomatic arches of P. curryi varies between specimens. The most pronounced zygomatic arches are seen in more robust specimens, suggesting that this might be a sexually dimorphic feature. The size of the lower canines also varies between specimens of P. curryi, with lower canine diameter in adults varying between 19–36 millimetres (0.75–1.42 in). Lower canine size has been interpreted as a potentially sexually dimorphic trait in other brontothere genera.

== Paleoecology ==
=== Temporal range ===
The deposits in the Titus Canyon Formation where the P. curryi type skull was found were traditionally interpreted as from the Chadronian land mammal age, and this occurrence of P. curryi has previously been dated to the middle Chadronian (Ch2). This would make Protitanops the only brontothere in North America other than Megacerops to persist into the Chadronian, though Megacerops survived to the end of the Chadronian (Ch4). At the time of their description, the Texan fossils were interpreted as ranging in age from the Duchesnean to early Chadronian, and the Mexican skull was interpreted as from the earliest Chadronian.

2022 reassessments of the fossil assemblages from which P. curryi is known restricted all of the assemblages to a brief temporal range in the middle Duchesnean, during the middle early to late Du2. Bruce E. Lander, Mihlbachler, Torrey Nyborg, and John P. Sifling used ^{40}Ar/^{39}Ar single-cryster-later fusion (SCLF) to date the temporal range of P. curryi to the interval 37.68 to 37.15 million years ago and proposed that P. curryi could be an index taxon of this time frame. Later in 2022, Lander and Nyborg noted that both of these dates should be considered tentative and subject to further studies, though maintained that P. curryi was restricted to Du2.

=== Habitat and contemporary taxa ===
Fossils of P. curryi have been identified in six different fossil assemblages, including the Titus Canyon Fauna (from the Titus Canyon Formation), three local faunas from Chambers Tuff in Texas (the Lower Porvenir Local Fauna, Upper Porvenir Local Fauna, and Upper Little Egypt Local Fauna), an unnamed assemblage from the Lower Chisos Formation, and the Rancho Gaitan Local Fauna (from the Prietos Formation).

At the time of the Titus Canyon Fauna, what is today Death Valley National Park was relatively flat and the modern valleys had not yet formed. The fossils were deposited at a time when the area was transitioning from a fluvial (river-adjacent) to a lacustrine (lake-adjacent) environment. Smaller animals from the Titus Canyon Fauna include indeterminate emydid turtles and various rodents (the ischyromyid Quadratomus? gigans, aplodontiid cf. Prosciurus sp., and cylindrodontid Dolocylindrodon texanus). In addition to Protitanops, several other perissodactyls were present, including the small equid Mesohippus viejensis, the helaletid (cursorial tapir) Colodon stovalli, and several rhinoceroses (Penetrigonias hudsoni, Teletaceras mortivallis, and Trigonias sp.). Several artiodactyls are known from the fauna, including agriochoerids Agriochoerus sp. and Eomeryx transmontanus, the protoceratid Pseudoprotoceras robustus, the leptomerycids Hendryomeryx? blacki and Hidrosotherium transpecosensis, and possibly the oromerycid Montanatylopus matthewi. Predators included the large hyaenodont Neohyaenodon sp. (Note: The Titus Canyon Neohyaenodon sp. was previously identified as an occurrence of Hyaenodon cf. horridus.) and the small amphicyonid (bear-dog) Daphoenictis sp. The different Chambers Tuff faunas are not as well-studied, but appear to have been faunally similar to the Titus Canyon Fauna.

The Rancho Gaitan Local Fauna is more distinct, perhaps due to being in a transitional zone between temperate and tropical climates. The Rancho Gaitan Local Fauna appears to be characteristic of a woodland environment. Smaller animals included various rodents (the cylindrodontids Jawilsonomys ojinagaensis, J. pintoensis, and Pseudocylindrodon cf. medius, and the paramyid Mitonomys gaitana) and possible insectivore (soricid?) fossils. Four families of artiodactyls were present; the agriochoerids (Agriochoerus maximus and Protoreodon petersoni), hypertragulids (Hypertragulus heikeni), leptomerycids (cf. Leptomeryx sp.), and merycoidodontids (Aclistomycter middletoni, Bathygenys reevesi, and Merycoidodon dunagani). Among the perissodactyls, the Rancho Gaitan Local Fauna includes hyracodonts (identified as Hyracodon cf. nebraskensis), indeterminate rhinoceroses, and the equid Mesohippus texanus. The only identified predator is a hyaenodont, likely belonging to a new genus.
