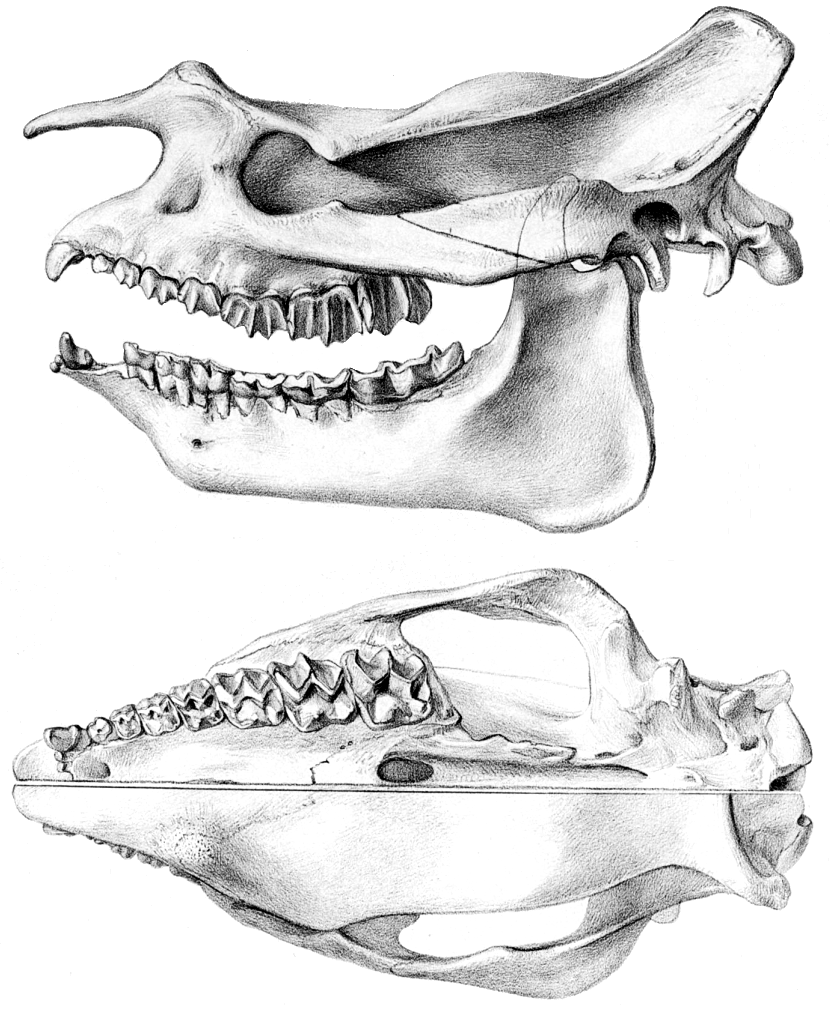
- Reconstruction of the skull and mandible of D. uintensis by Robert Bruce Horsfall. (Note: Horsfall's reconstruction is based on the type mandible (CMNH 11809) and paratype skull (CMNH 11759) and accounts for the effects of taphonomic distortion.)

Scientific classification
- Kingdom: Animalia
- Phylum: Chordata
- Class: Mammalia
- Order: Perissodactyla
- Family: †Brontotheriidae
- Subfamily: †Brontotheriinae
- Tribe: †Brontotheriini
- Subtribe: †Brontotheriina
- Infratribe: †Brontotheriita
- Genus: †Duchesneodus; Lucas & Schoch, 1982
- Species: †D. uintensis

Binomial name
- †Duchesneodus uintensis (Peterson, 1931) [originally Teleodus]

Synonyms
- Teleodus uintensis Peterson, 1931

= Duchesneodus =

Duchesneodus Temporal range: Middle Eocene (late Uintan–Duchesnean), 42.8–37 Ma

Extinct genus of mammals

Duchesneodus (lit. 'Duchesnean (Note: "Duchesnean" in this case references both the Duchesnean land mammal age and the Duchesne River Formation.) tooth') is an extinct genus of horned brontothere that lived in North America during the Middle Eocene, in the late Uintan and Duchesnean land mammal ages. Several species of Duchesneodus have been recognized historically but only one species is seen as valid today, D. uintensis. Fossils of Duchesneodus were first discovered in the Duchesne River Formation in Utah. Fossils have also been found in the Galisteo Formation of New Mexico, and in the Vieja Area of Texas.

Duchesneodus was a large brontothere, though smaller than the later Megacerops. No postcranial elements of Duchesneodus have been securely identified, but it was probably similar to Megacerops. Several features of the skull distinguish Duchesneodus from its relatives, notably the presence of a developed dome on the skull's upper surface.

== Research history ==
=== Description of D. uintensis ===
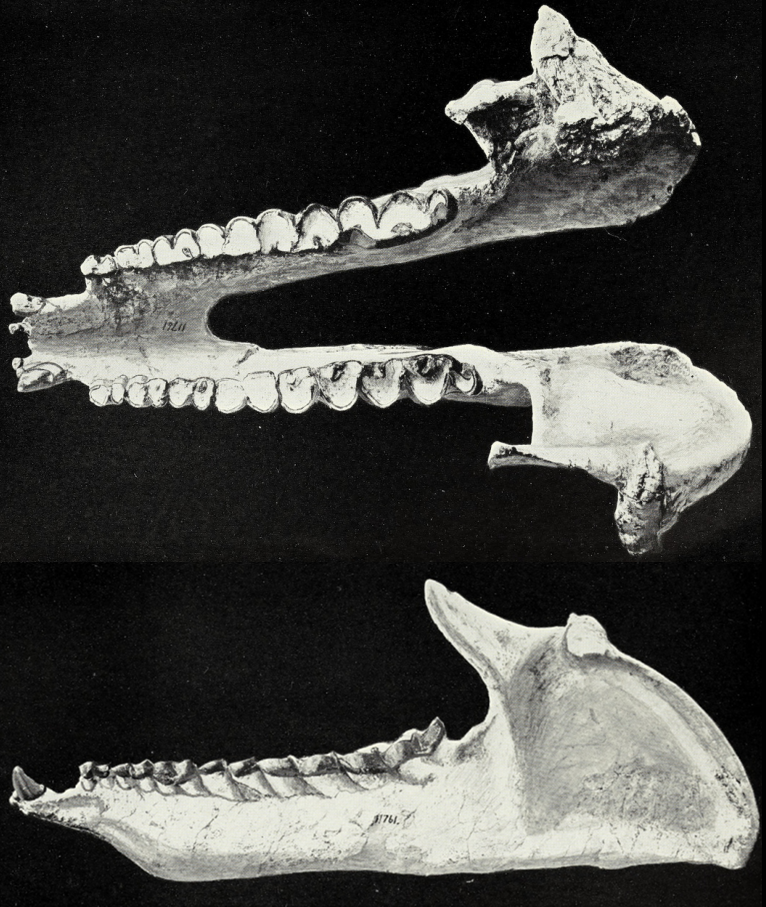
Type mandible (CMNH 11809) of D. uintensis

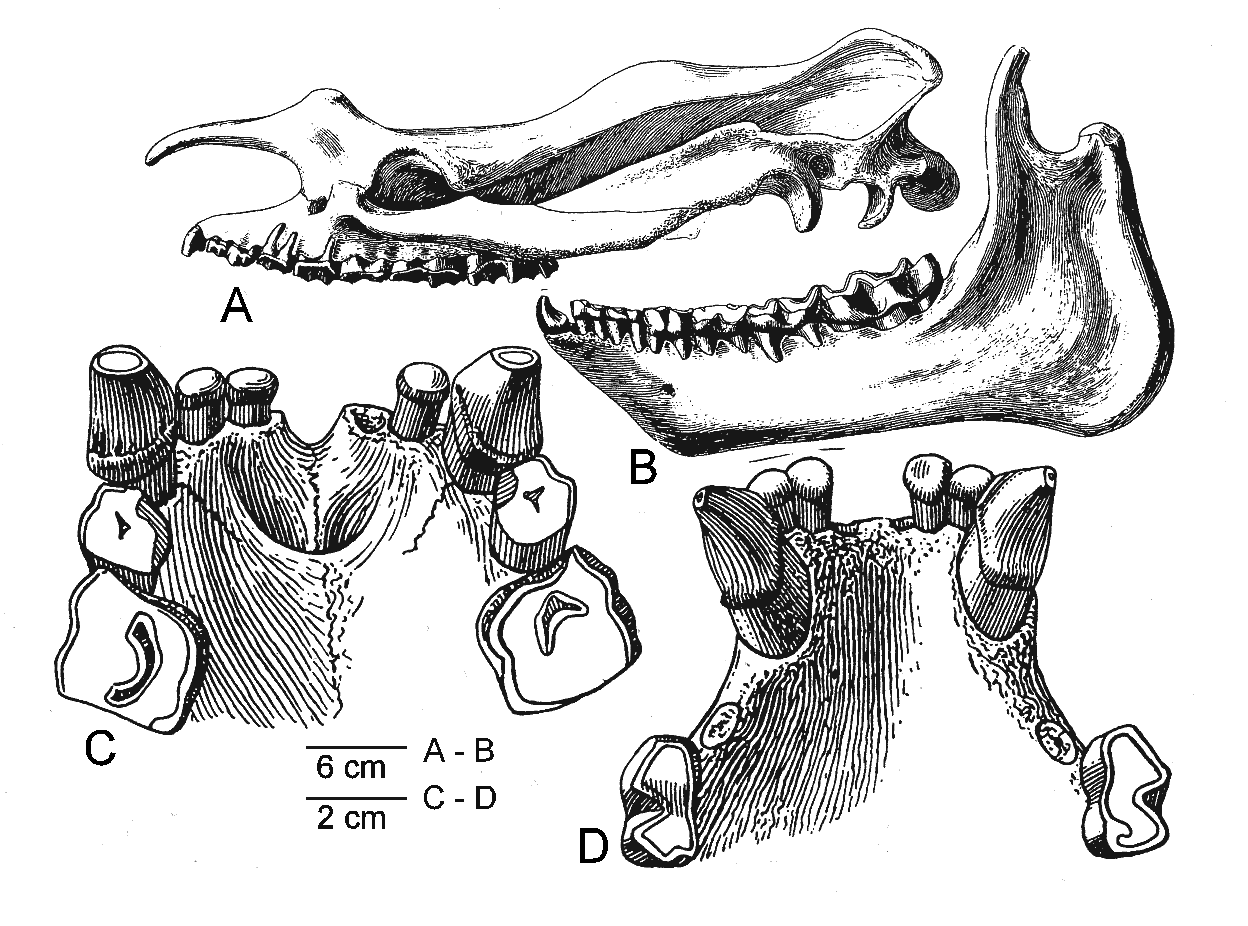
Original illustrations by Olof August Peterson of the paratype (A) and holotype (B) skull and mandible of D. uintensis (CMNH 11759 and CMNH 11809), and the upper (C) and lower (D) front dentition.

Duchesneodus uintensis was originally described as Teleodus uintensis by Olof August Peterson in 1931, based on fossils found by a Carnegie Museum expedition led by J. L. Kay in 1929–1930. Teleodus is a now obsolete genus, named by Othniel Charles Marsh and previously known from a Chadronian (the North American land mammal age succeeding the Duchesnean) brontothere jaw with six lower incisors (T. avus). The type specimen of T. uintensis is a practically complete mandible, CMNH 11809, found in the "Titanothere Quarry", 11 miles west of Vernal, Utah. Geologically, the fossil is from the LaPoint Member of the Duchesne River Formation. According to Peterson, several additional fossils were found, from over twenty individuals. Peterson designated two paratype specimens, including CMNH 11759 (a complete skull) and CMNH 11761 (another complete mandible, slightly crushed). The species name uintensis derives from Peterson's incorrect assessment that these first fossils were Uintan in age.

Peterson justified assignment of T. uintensis to Teleodus mainly by the presence of six lower incisors. In T. uintensis, the lower incisors were perceived to be similar to the type specimen of T. avus, but positioned in a less crowded way. The third pair of lower incisors was positioned close to the inner side of the canines and were small, with short and blunt tooth crowns. Peterson also compared T. uintensis to a Duchesnean lower jaw described as Megacerops primitivus by Lawrence Lambe in 1908. M. primitivus was classified in Teleodus by Henry Fairfield Osborn in 1929, also due to its incisors. Since the cheek teeth of T. uintensis are broader than those of T. primitivus, with lesser vertical labial faces (front faces), Peterson considered T. uintensis to be intermediate between T. primitivus and the later T. avus.

Peterson established several distinguishing features of Teleodus based on his new fossils, more complete than previous fossils assigned to the genus. These included both dental and cranial features, such as the possession of four upper incisors, and the skull roof being convex. Peterson's description of T. uintensis was preliminary, and he had hoped to follow it up with a more detailed description of all the fossils. After Peterson's death in 1933, William Berryman Scott took over this project. Scott published a more detailed description of T. uintensis in 1945.

=== Further discoveries and taxonomy ===
Two additional Teleodus species were described after 1945: Chester Stock named T. californicus from the Sespe Formation in California in 1935, and Philip R. Bjork named T. thyboi from the Slim Buttes Formation in South Dakota in 1967. Teleodus fossils were also reported from the Green River Formation in Utah, the Galisteo Formation in New Mexico, and Chambers Tuff Formation in Texas. Assignment of fossils to Teleodus was for the most part justified through cranial and upper dental features shared with Peterson's T. uintensis fossils.

In 1982, Spencer G. Lucas and Robert M. Schoch cast doubt on the taxonomic validity of the T. avus type specimen (YPM 10321). They noted that other than the six lower incisors, YPM 10321 falls within the range of Brontops and Brontotherium (both now considered to represent Megacerops, the major Chadronian brontothere genus). Examination of YPM 10321 revealed that the outermost lower incisors could not be established to have roots actually going into the mandible, leading Lucas and Schoch to suggest that these were either deciduous teeth or that they had been fraudulently added to the fossil. In either case, they were not of taxonomic importance. In 2004, Lucas examined correspondence between Marsh and L. W. Stilwell, who had sold Marsh the fossil, and revealed YPM 10321 to be a hoax, with two additional incisors added by Stilwell to drive up the price. With YPM 10321 determined to be nondiagnostic, and Teleodus thus being invalid, a new genus was required to contain the other species referred to the genus. Lucas and Schoch thus named the genus Duchesneodus. Duchesneodus means "Duchesnean tooth", named after both the Duchesnean land mammal age and the Duchesne River Formation. Lucas and Schoch designated T. uintensis (as Duchesneodus uintensis) as the type species, since it was known from the best preserved fossils. The other former Teleodus species, T. primitivus, T. californicus, and T. thyboi, were also classified as species of Duchesneodus.

In 1989, Lucas and Schoch revised Duchesneodus further. D. californicus and D. thyboi were designated as synonyms of D. uintensis, though D. primitivus was retained as a valid species. Lucas and Schoch also referred a large number of fragmentary Duchesnean brontothere specimens to Duchesneodus. Lucas and Schoch suggested that Duchesneodus could be an index taxon for the Duchesnean. In 2008, Matthew C. Mihlbachler noted that most of the fragmentary fossils are nondiagnostic and not possible to assign to Duchesneodus since they could equally likely belong to genera such as Protitanops and Notiotitanops. Mihlbachler noted that only D. uintensis is based on complete fossil material and designated the other three species, D. primitivus, D. californicus, and D. thyboi as nomina dubia, based on nondiagnostic type specimens. Per Mihlbachler, D. primitivus could represent D. uintensis, Protitanops curryi, or Notiotitanops mississippiensis, D. californicus could represent P. curryi or N. mississippiensis, and D. thyboi could represent Eubrontotherium clarnoensis, P. curryi, or N. mississippiensis. Per Mihlbacher's revisions, definitive D. uintensis is recorded only in the Duchesne River Formation of Utah, the Galisteo Formation of New Mexico, and the Vieja Area of Texas.

Mihlbachler considered it "both surprising and unfortunate" that Peterson designated the mandible CMNH 11809 as the holotype, since this fossil is much less diagnostic than the paratype CMNH 11759. CMNH 11759 is not technically differentiable from specimens of some other brontothere genera, such as Protitanops, Notiotitanops, or even Megacerops. Since the skulls found in the same quarry clearly belong to a unique brontothere species, the validity of D. uintensis relies on Peterson's assumption that the quarry finds represent a monospecific brontothere assemblage (individuals all belonging to the same species).

== Description ==
Duchesneodus was a large brontothere, estimated to have reached a body mass of 1,342 kilograms (2,959 lb). There are no securely identified postcranial elements of Duchesneodus but it was probably similar to the later Megacerops in most aspects of its anatomy. Like its close relatives, Duchesneodus had a saddle-shaped skull. Duchesneodus differs most noticeably from Megacerops in that it had three pairs of lower incisors rather than two pairs, as well as a dome on the dorsal (upper) surface of its skull. Some Megacerops specimens have a similar dome, though not nearly as large as in Duchesneodus. Duchesneodus was also relatively small when compared to Megacerops.

In addition to the dome, Duchesneodus also had small- to medium-sized and relatively round horns, placed slightly in front of the eyes. The horns vary in size and height between individuals, though do not reach the size seen in the horns of Megacerops.

Duchesneodus exhibited sexual dimorphism in a similar magnitude to modern horned and tusked ungulates. The dome on the head of Duchesneodus, present in both males and females was strongly dimorphic. Females had a lower but prominent dome while the males had larger domes similar to those of the chalicothere Tylocephalonyx. The zygomatic arches also varied considerably in thickness between individuals, interpreted as a result of dimorphism.
