= Chester Stock =

American paleontologist

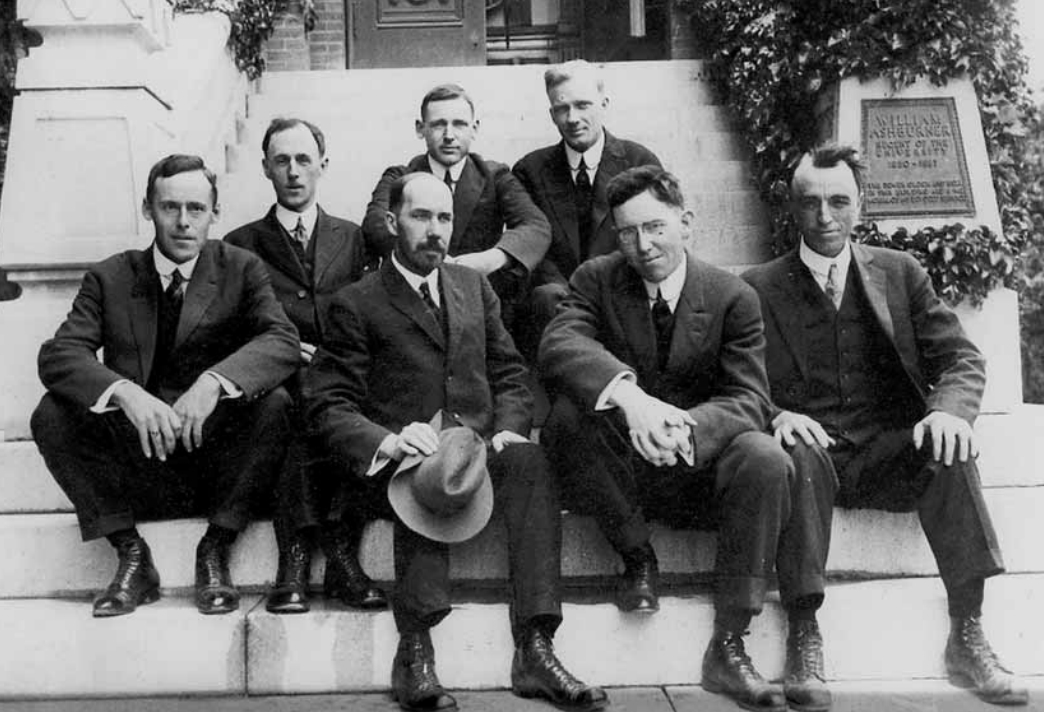
- Stock seated (front, second from right) with John C. Merriam (with hat) and others c. 1915

Chester Stock (28 January 1892 – 7 December 1950) was an American paleontologist who specialized in the Pleistocene mammalian fauna of the La Brea Tar Pits. He was a professor of geology at the California Institute of Technology, Pasadena.

Stock was born in San Francisco to John Englebert Stock and Maria Henriette Meyer, both German immigrants. He grew up in a poor neighborhood, selling newspapers to earn some money. He was educated at Starr King Primary School and Franklin Grammar School, spending weekends at a gymnasium studying German, and learned to play the tuba at a local Lutheran church. He also took an interest in science, attending the annual mechanics fair and the museum of the California Academy of Sciences. His family home was destroyed by fires caused by the 1906 San Francisco earthquake. He later joined the California National Guard. He was forced by circumstances to leave school and seek employment in the Union Iron Works, at which time his health deteriorated, and he came down with malaria. His mother and brother pushed him back into his studies, and he graduated in 1910 from Mission High School. He then attended the University of California, Berkeley intending to study medicine but, influenced by John C. Merriam, instead took an interest in paleontology. He wrote a paper on the remains found at the Rancho La Brea for his graduation in 1914, after which he continued his studies under Merriam. He collected paleontological samples in the Hawker Cave for his 1918 PhD dissertation. He soon joined the university as an instructor, and when Merriam moved to Washington in 1921, began teaching vertebrate paleontology. The newly founded California Institute of Technology was being expanded by R.A. Millikan, who recruited J.P. Buwalda and Chester Stock for the geology department; Stock worked there until his death. The plesiosaur Morenosaurus stocki, a flamingo Phoenicopterus stocki, and a fossil bat Desmodus stocki are among the species that have been named after him.

In 1921, Chester married Clara Margaret Doud, with whom he had a son and a daughter. After her death in 1934, he married Margaret Gardner Wood in 1935, and they had a son.

Stock was elected to the American Academy of Arts and Sciences in 1941, the American Philosophical Society in 1946, and the United States National Academy of Sciences in 1948.
