= Notiotitanops =

Notiotitanops Temporal range: Middle Eocene (late Uintan), 42.8–40.1 Ma

Scientific classification
- Kingdom: Animalia
- Phylum: Chordata
- Class: Mammalia
- Infraclass: Placentalia
- Order: Perissodactyla
- Family: †Brontotheriidae
- Subfamily: †Brontotheriinae
- Tribe: †Brontotheriini
- Subtribe: †Brontotheriina
- Infratribe: †Brontotheriita
- Genus: †Notiotitanops; Gazin and Sullivan, 1942
- Species: †N. mississippiensis

Binomial name
- †Notiotitanops mississippiensis Gazin & Sullivan, 1942

Notiotitanops is an extinct genus of horned brontothere that lived in North America during the Middle Eocene, in the late Uintan land mammal age.
