= List of the Cenozoic life of Montana =

This list of the Cenozoic life of Montana contains the various prehistoric life-forms whose fossilized remains have been reported from within the US state of Montana and are between 66 million and 10,000 years of age.

== A ==
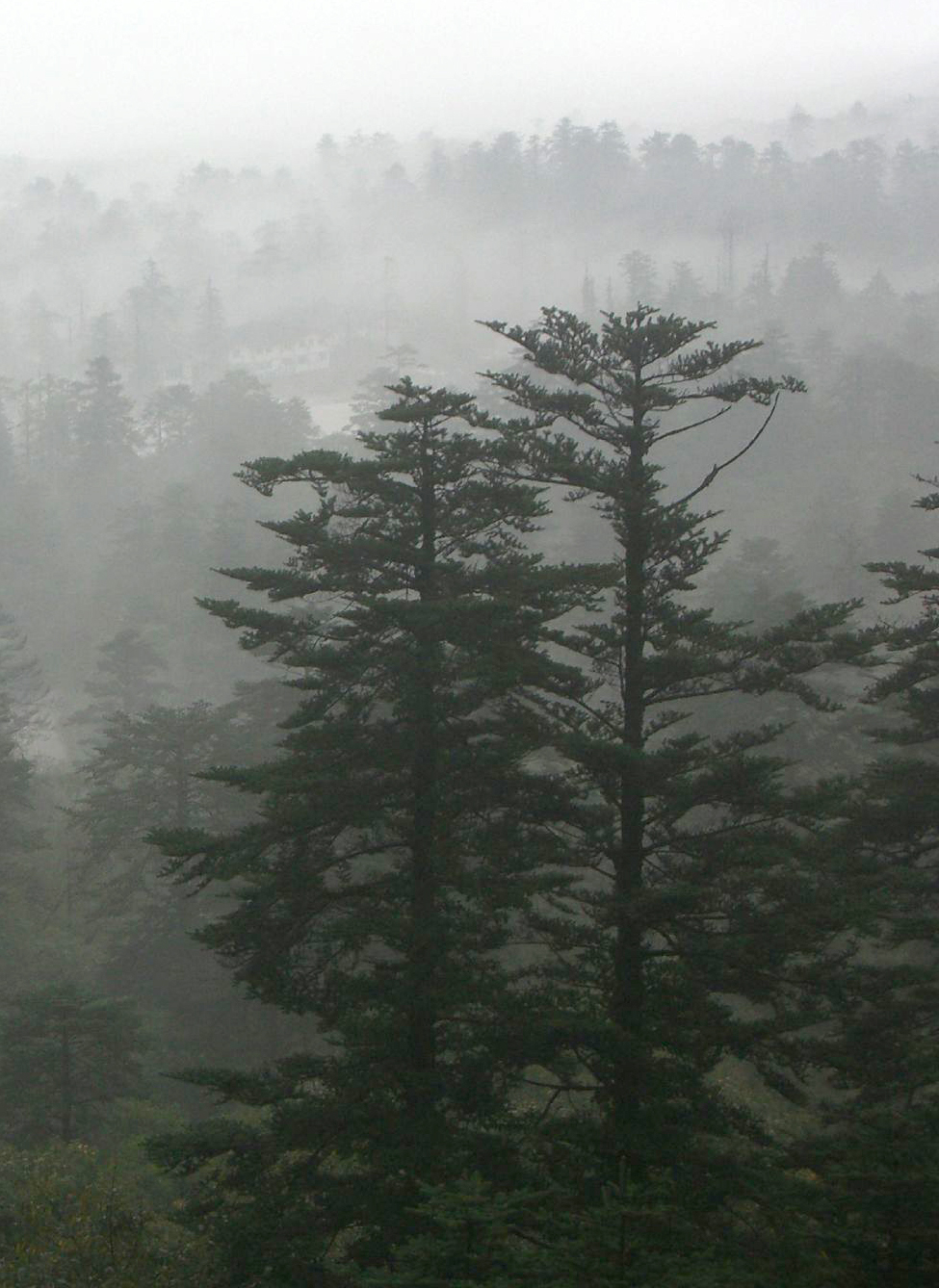
- Living Abies, or fir trees
  Abies
  - †Abies alvordensis
  - †Abies concoloroides
  - †Abies laticarpa
- Acer
  - †Acer bendirei
  - †Acer bolanderi
  - †Acer glabroides
  - †Acer minor
  - †Acer newberryi
  - †Acer oregonianum
  - †Acer scottiae
  - †Acer silberlingi
- †Acheronodon
  - †Acheronodon garbani – type locality for species
- Acipenser
- †Acmeodon
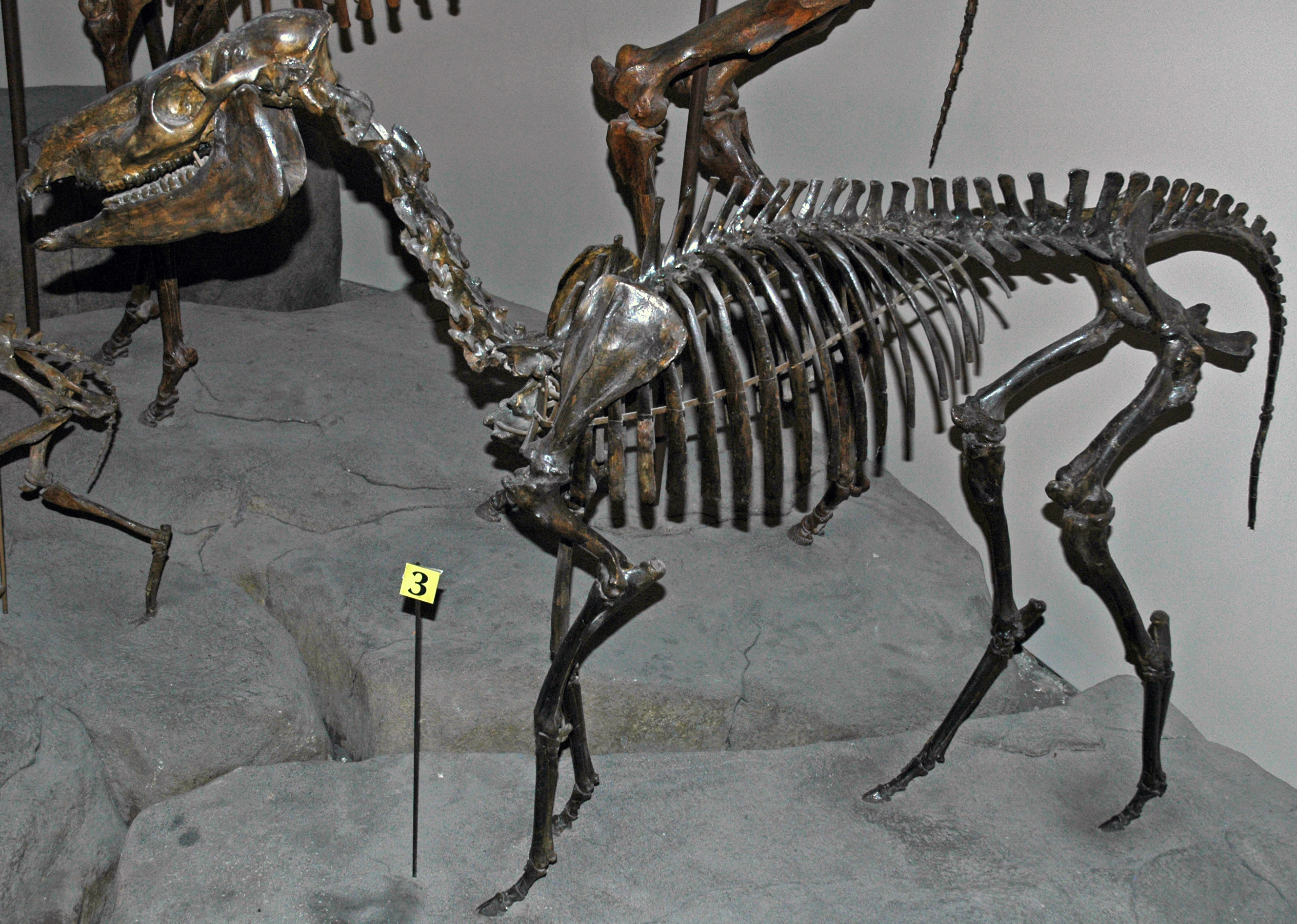
- Mounted fossilized skeleton of the Miocene horse Acritohippus
  †Acritohippus
  - †Acritohippus isonesus
- †Acritoparamys
  - †Acritoparamys atavus – type locality for species
- †Actinodonta
- †Adjidaumo
  - †Adjidaumo intermedius – or unidentified comparable form
  - †Adjidaumo minimus – type locality for species
- †Adunator
  - †Adunator ladae
- †Aelurodon
  - †Aelurodon ferox – or unidentified comparable form
  - †Aelurodon montanensis – type locality for species
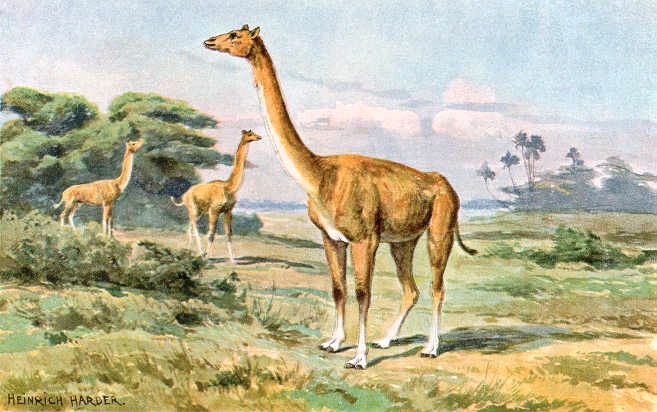
- Life restoration of the Miocene camel Aepycamelus, or the long-necked camel. Heinrich Harder (1920).
  †Aepycamelus
  - †Aepycamelus stocki
- †Agnotocastor
  - †Agnotocastor montanus
- †Agriochoerus
  - †Agriochoerus maximus – type locality for species
  - †Agriochoerus minimus
- †Agrostis
  - †Agrostis primaeva
- †Ailanthus
  - †Ailanthus americana
- Alangium
  - †Alangium thomae
- †Alepidophora
  - †Alepidophora maxima – type locality for species
- †Alismaphyllites
  - †Alismaphyllites grandifolius
- Alnus
  - †Alnus jarbidgana
  - †Alnus protomaximowiczii
  - †Alnus relata
- †Alphagaulus
  - †Alphagaulus pristinus
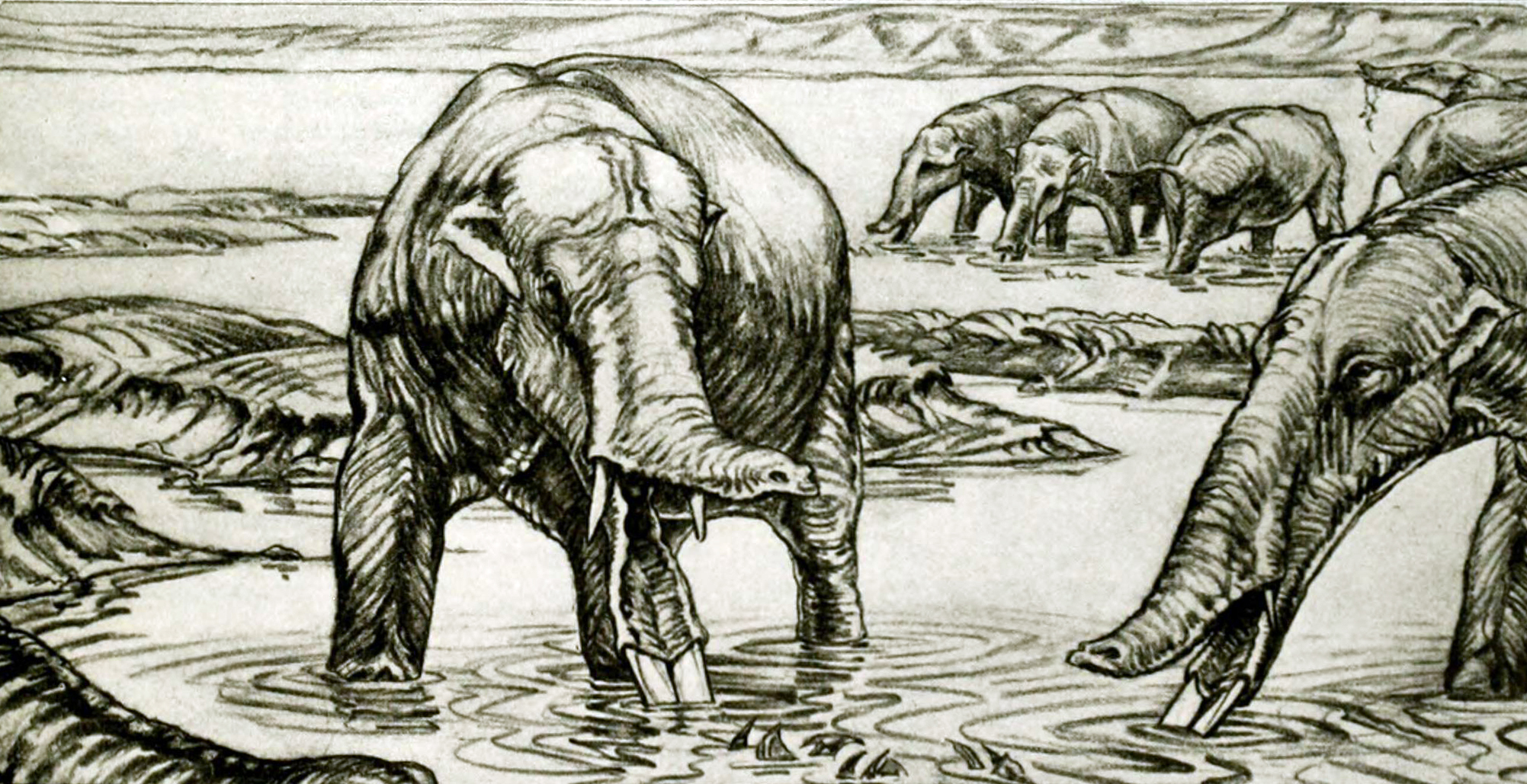
- Life restoration of the Miocene elephant relative Amebelodon. Margret Flinsch (1932).
  †Amebelodon
  - †Amebelodon floridanus – or unidentified comparable form
- Amelanchier
  - †Amelanchier couleeana
  - †Amelanchier covea
- †Amentotaxus
  - †Amentotaxus campbelli
- Amia
  - †Amia fragosa
  - †Amia uintaensis
- †Ampelopsis
  - †Ampelopsis acerifolia
- †Amphechinus
  - †Amphechinus horncloudi
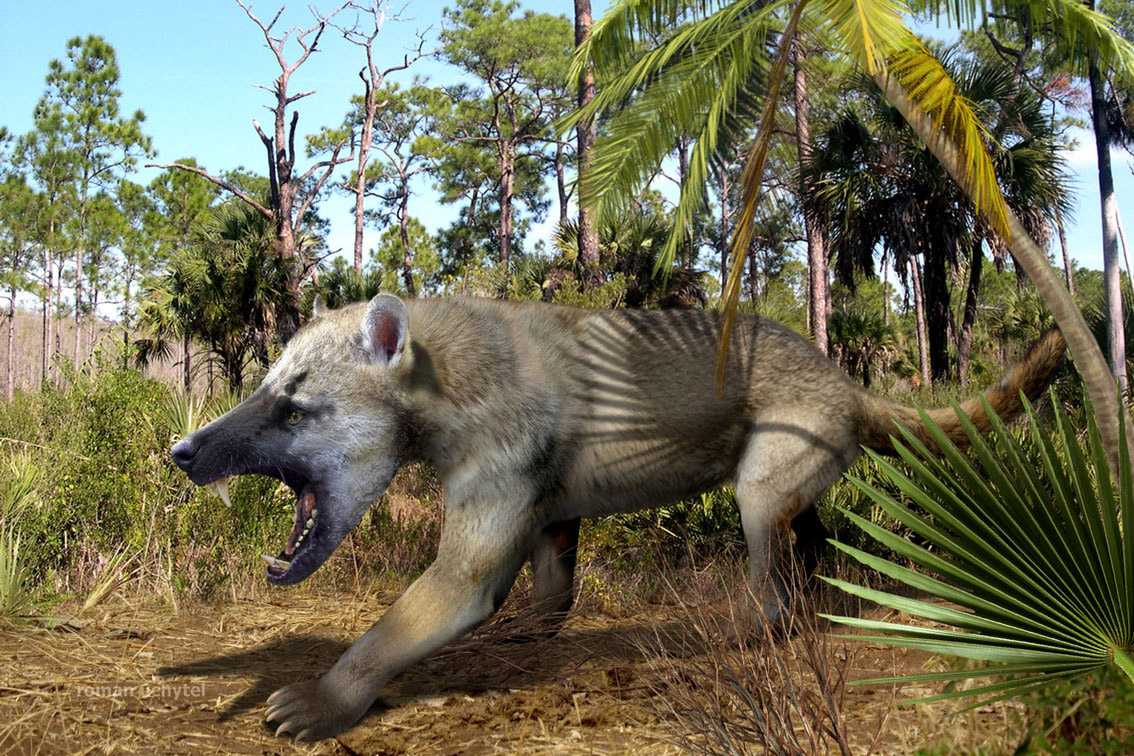
- Life restoration of the Miocene-Pliocene beardog Amphicyon
  †Amphicyon
  - †Amphicyon riggsi – type locality for species
- †Amynodon
  - †Amynodon advenus – or unidentified comparable form
- †Amyzon
- †Anacodon
  - †Anacodon ursidens – or unidentified comparable form
- Anas
  - †Anas platyrhynchos – or unidentified comparable form
- †Ancenycteris
  - †Ancenycteris rasmusseni
- †Anconodon
  - †Anconodon cochranensis
  - †Anconodon gidleyi – type locality for species
- †Anemia
  - †Anemia elongata
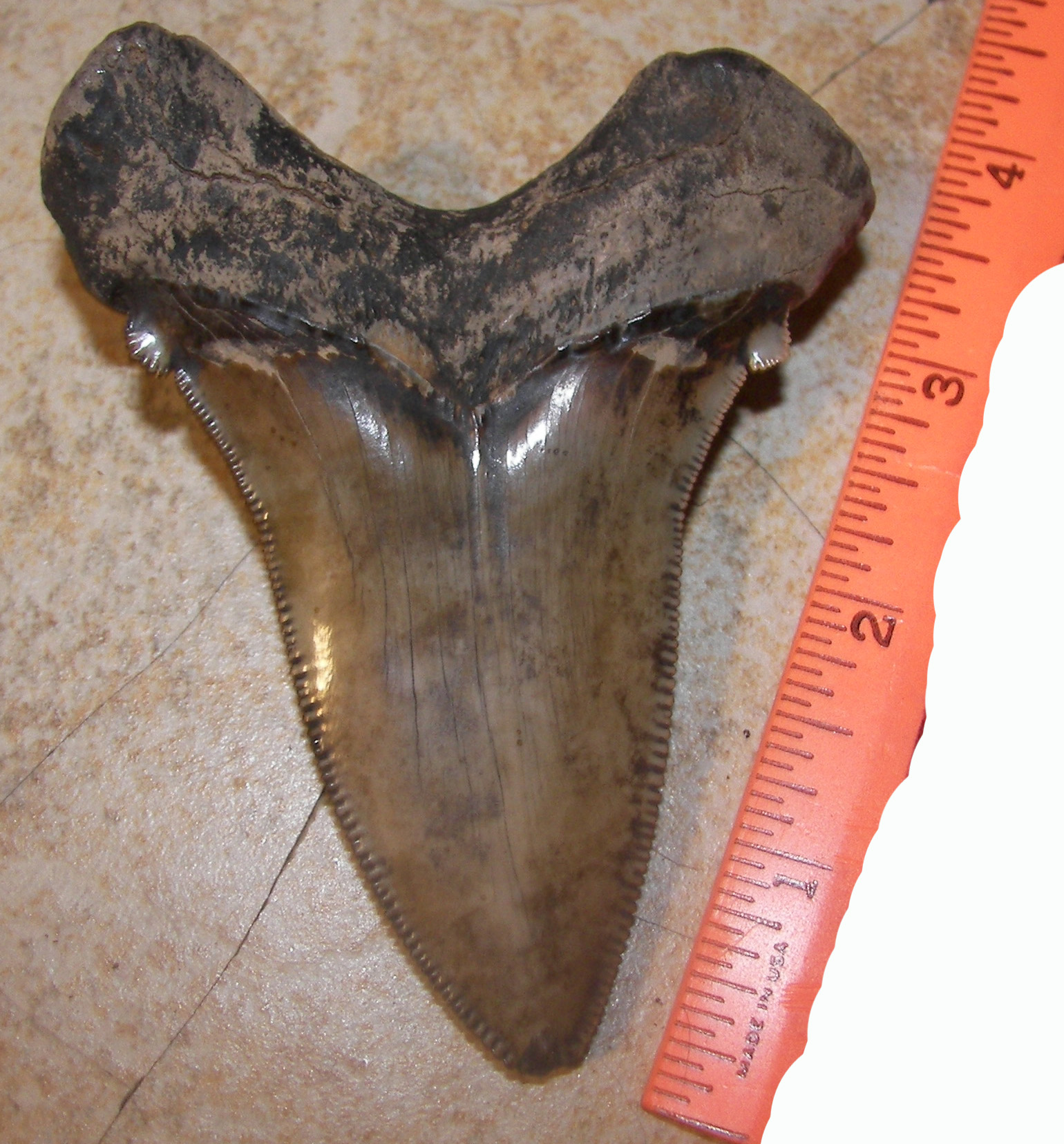
- Fossilized tooth of the Oligocene-Miocene shark Carcharocles angustidens
  †Angustidens
  - †Angustidens vireti – or unidentified comparable form
- †Anisonchus
  - †Anisonchus oligistus
  - †Anisonchus sectorius
- †Ansomys
  - †Ansomys hepburnensis – type locality for species
  - †Ansomys nexodens
- †Antholithes
  - †Antholithes asterias – type locality for species
  - †Antholithes botryanthera – type locality for species
  - †Antholithes divaricanthera – type locality for species
  - †Antholithes explodens – type locality for species
  - †Antholithes glandulifera – type locality for species
  - †Antholithes onagracioides – type locality for species
  - †Antholithes tropaeoloides – type locality for species
  - †Antholithes tulipoidea – type locality for species
  - †Antholithes umbelloidea – type locality for species
  - †Antholithes urnanthera – type locality for species
  - †Antholithes zygomorpha – type locality for species
- Antilocapra – or unidentified comparable form
  - †Antilocapra americana
- †Aphelops
- †Aphronorus
  - †Aphronorus fraudator – type locality for species
  - †Aphronorus orieli
- †Apternodus
  - †Apternodus baladontus – type locality for species
  - †Apternodus mediaevus – type locality for species
- †Araceaeites
- †Araucaria
  - †Araucaria longifolia
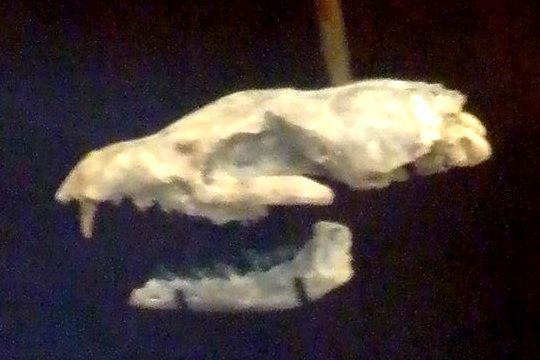
- Fossilized skull of the Oligocene bone-crushing dog Archaeocyon
  †Archaeocyon
  - †Archaeocyon leptodus
- †Archaeohippus
- †Archaeolagus
- †Archisyrphus – type locality for genus
  - †Archisyrphus opacus – type locality for species
- †Arctocyon
  - †Arctocyon ferox
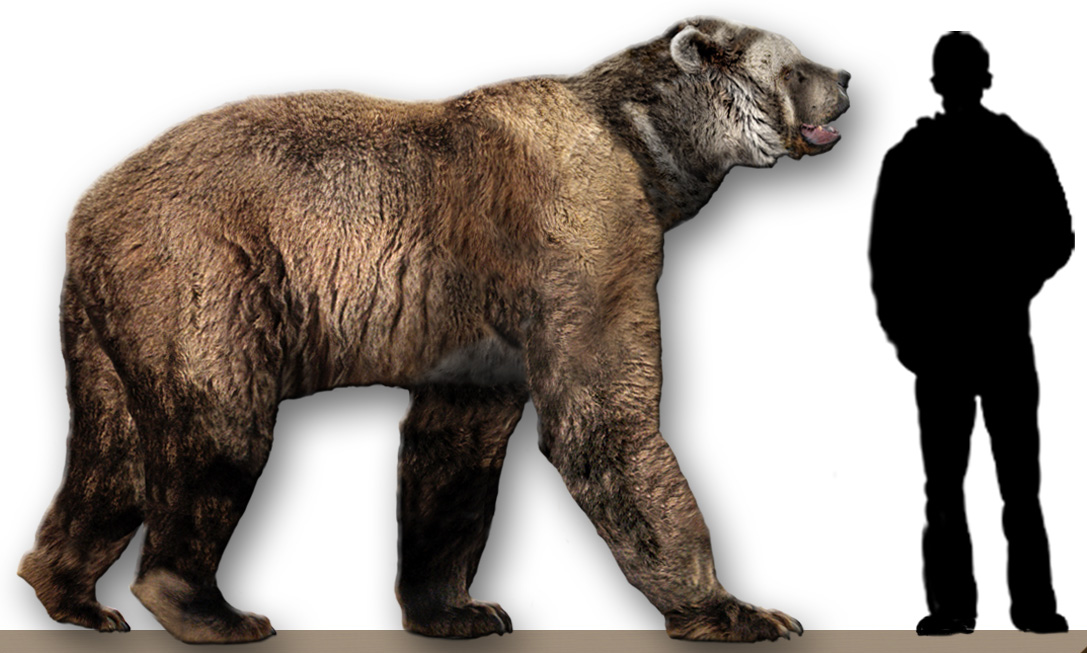
- Restoration of an Arctodus, or short-faced bear, with a human to scale
  †Arctodus
  - †Arctodus simus
- †Arctostaphylos
  - †Arctostaphylos cuneata
- †Ardynomys
  - †Ardynomys occidentalis – type locality for species
- †Arretotherium
  - †Arretotherium acridens – type locality for species
- Arundo
  - †Arundo pseudogoepperti
- Arvicola
  - †Arvicola richardsonii
- †aspera
  - †aspera aspera
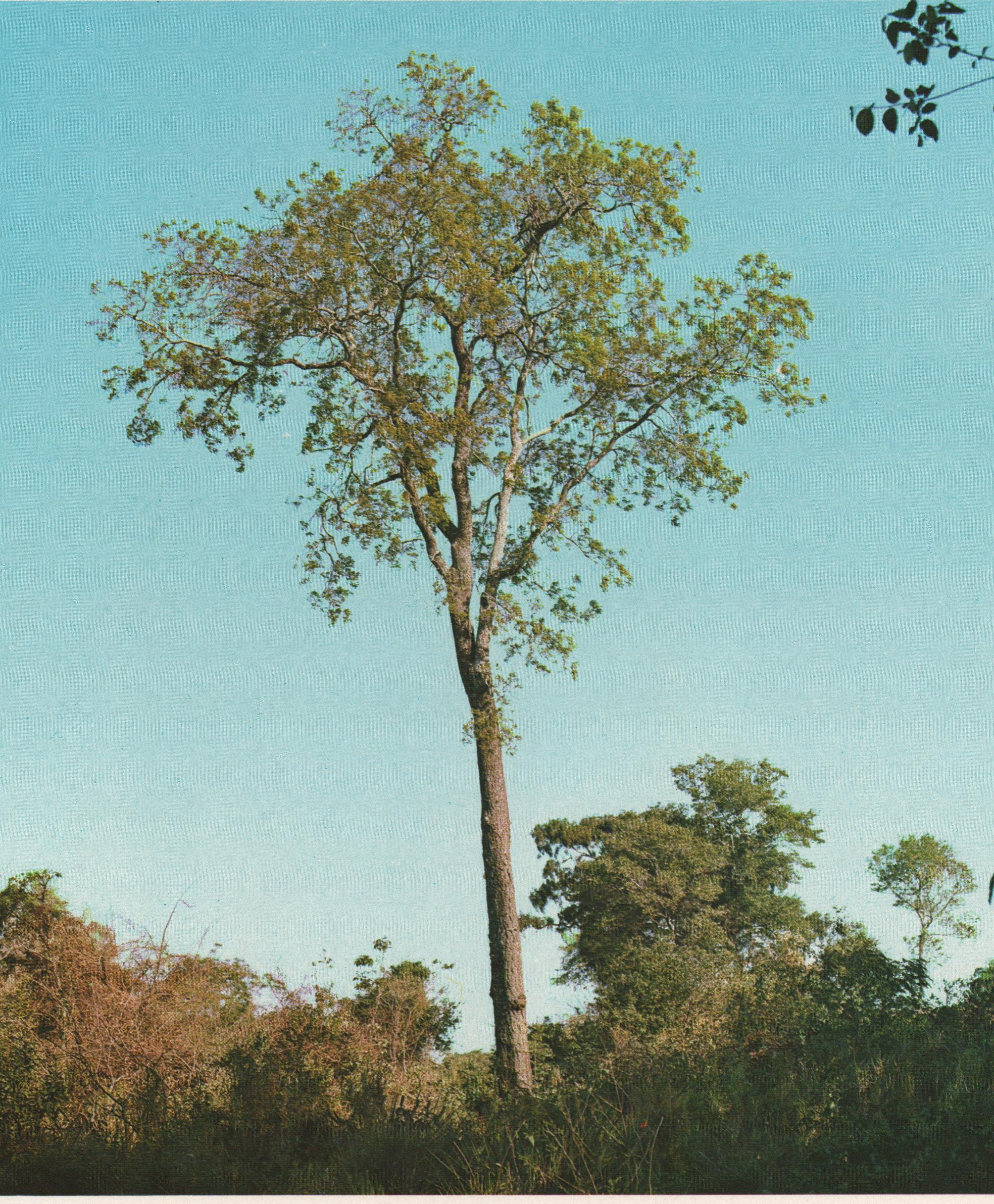
- A living Astronium tree, which is related to cashews
  †Astronium
  - †Astronium truncatum
- †Athyana
  - †Athyana haydenii
- †Atoposemys
  - †Atoposemys entopteros
- †Aulolithomys
  - †Aulolithomys bounites – type locality for species
- †Averrhoites
  - †Averrhoites affinis
- †Avunculus
  - †Avunculus didelphodonti – type locality for species
- †Axestemys
  - †Axestemys montinsana
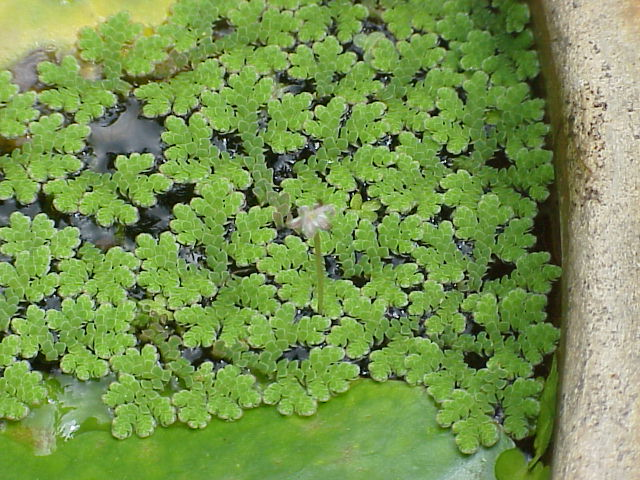
- Living Azolla water ferns
  Azolla
  - †Azolla elegans – type locality for species
  - †Azolla fragilis – type locality for species
  - †Azolla velus

== B ==
- †Baioconodon
  - †Baioconodon denverensis – or unidentified comparable form
  - †Baioconodon engdahli – type locality for species
  - †Baioconodon nordicus – type locality for species
- †Baiotomeus
  - †Baiotomeus douglassi
  - †Baiotomeus lamberti – type locality for species
- †Bathygenys
  - †Bathygenys alpha – type locality for species
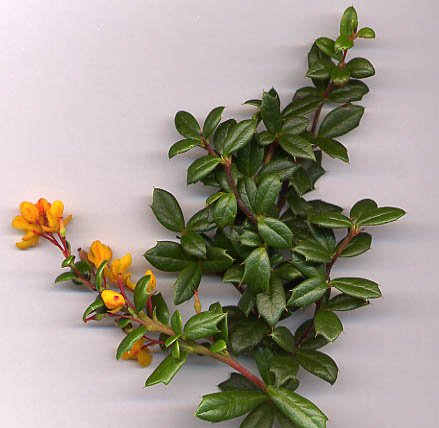
- Shoot and flowers of a modern Berberis, or barberry
  †Berberis
  - †Berberis acanthoides
- Berchemia
  - †Berchemia huanoides
- †Beringiaphyllum
  - †Beringiaphyllum cupanioides
- †Bessoecetor
  - †Bessoecetor septentrionalis
- Betula
  - †Betula fairii
  - †Betula stevensoni
  - †Betula thor
  - †Betula vera
- Bibio – or unidentified related form
- Bison
  - †Bison bison
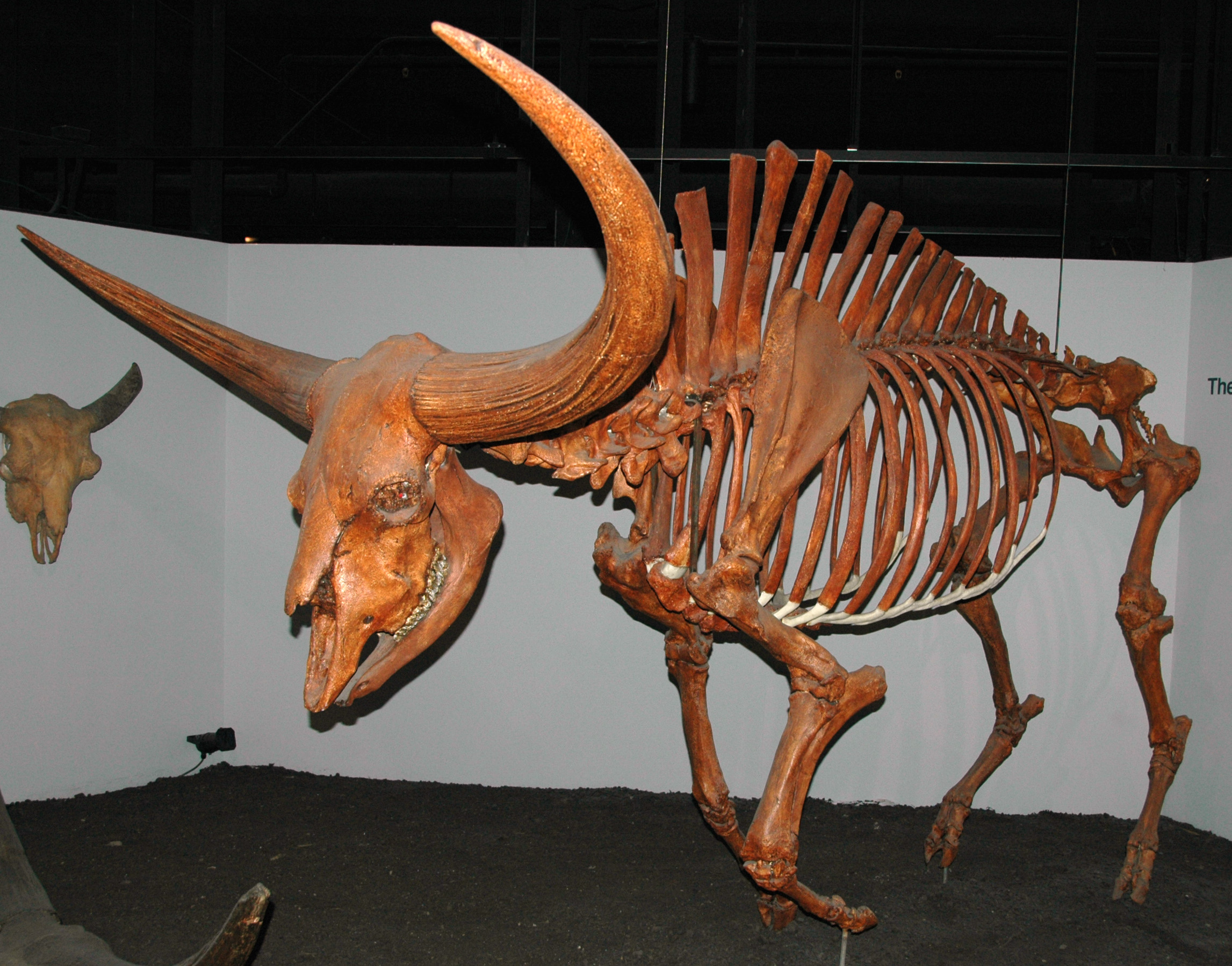
  - Mounted fossilized skeleton of the Pleistocene Bison latifrons, also known as the giant bison or long-horned bison
    †Bison latifrons – or unidentified comparable form
- †Bisonalveus
  - †Bisonalveus browni
- †Blastomeryx
  - †Blastomeryx gemmifer
- †Bootherium
- †Borealosuchus
  - †Borealosuchus sternbergii
- †Brachychampsa
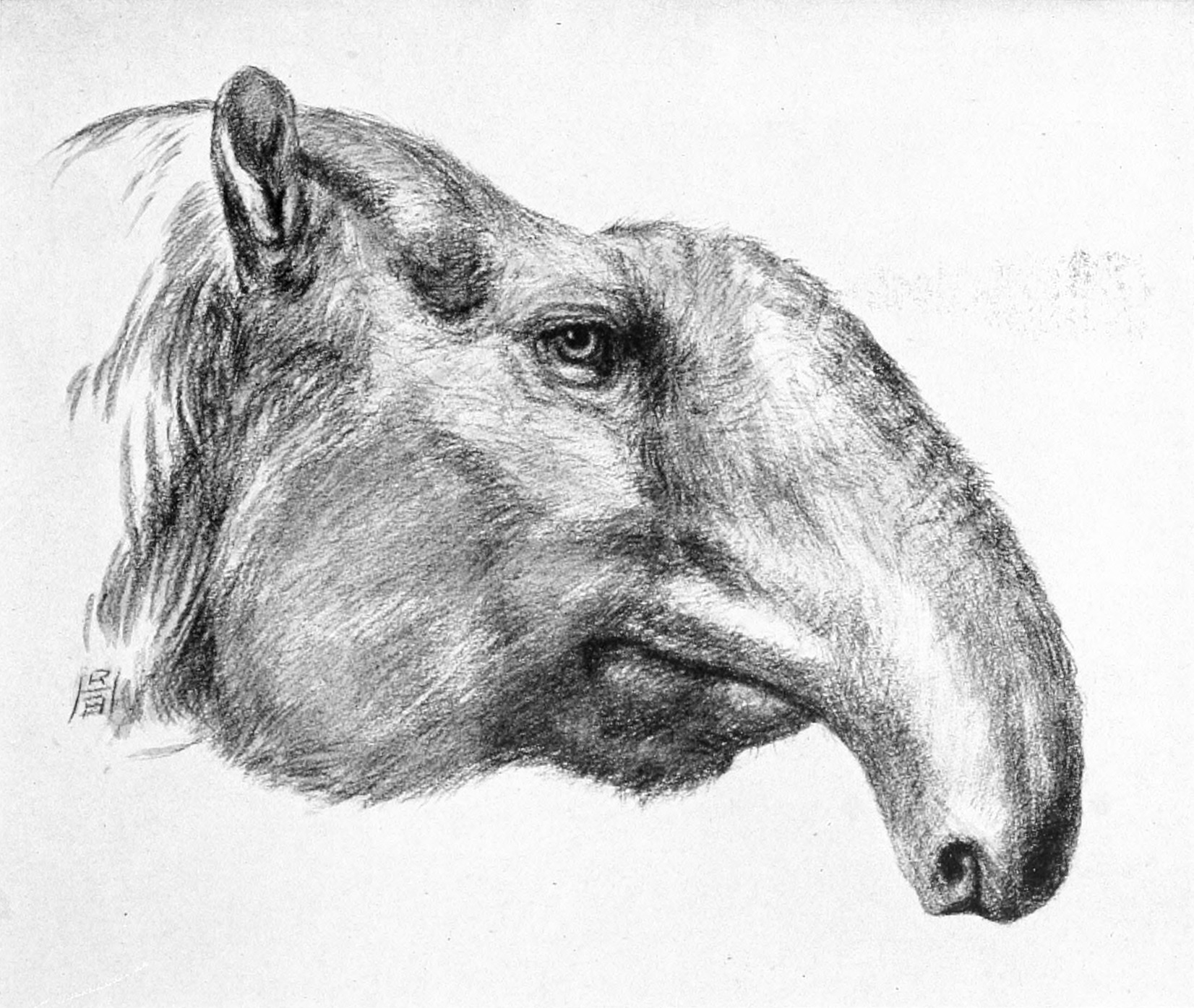
- Restorative portrait of the Miocene oreodont mammal Brachycrus
  †Brachycrus
  - †Brachycrus laticeps
- †Brachyerix
  - †Brachyerix incertis
- †Brachyrhynchocyon
  - †Brachyrhynchocyon dodgei
  - †Brachyrhynchocyon montanus – type locality for species
- †Browniea
  - †Browniea serrata

== C ==
- †Caesalpinites
  - †Caesalpinites acuminatus
  - †Caesalpinites coloradicus
- †Calycites
  - †Calycites hexaphylla
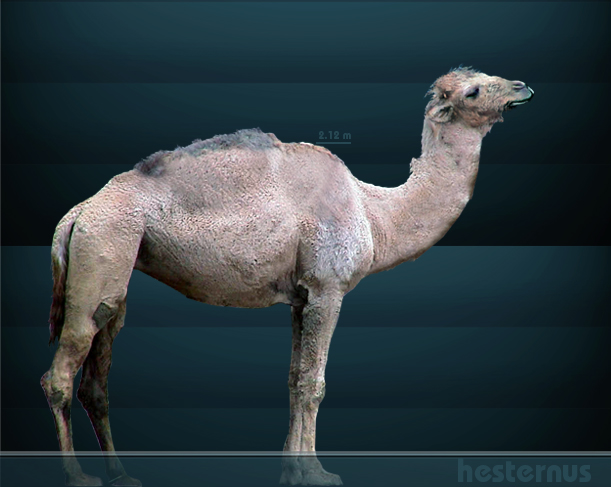
- Life restoration of the Pliocene-Holocene camel Camelops
  †Camelops
  - †Camelops minidokae
- †Camponotites
- †Canavalia
  - †Canavalia eocenica
- Canis
  - †Canis latrans
  - †Canis lupus
- †Canna
  - †Canna flaccidafolia
- †Carcinodon
  - †Carcinodon aquilonius
- †Cardiospermum
  - †Cardiospermum terminalis
- Carpinus
  - †Carpinus fraterna
  - †Carpinus lanceolata
- †Carpites
  - †Carpites amygdaloides – type locality for species
  - †Carpites carumcarvi – type locality for species
  - †Carpites eludens – type locality for species
  - †Carpites gracilens – type locality for species
  - †Carpites paniculatus – type locality for species
  - †Carpites polygonoides
  - †Carpites pruniformis – type locality for species
  - †Carpites racemosus – type locality for species
  - †Carpites verrucosus
- †Carpodaptes
  - †Carpodaptes hazelae – type locality for species
  - †Carpodaptes jepseni – tentative report
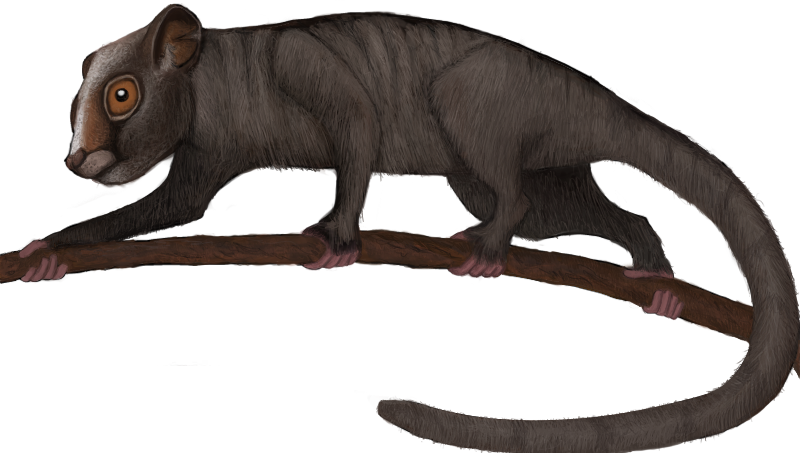
- Life restoration of the Paleocene primate relative Carpolestes
  †Carpolestes
  - †Carpolestes nigridens – type locality for species
- Carya
  - †Carya antiquorum
  - †Carya libbeyi
- †Cassia
  - †Cassia fayettensis
  - †Cassia hesperia
  - †Cassia reticuloides
- Castanea
  - †Castanea dolichophylla
  - †Castanea intermedia
  - †Castanea miomollissima
  - †Castanea spokanensis
  - †Castanea spolanensis
- Castor
  - †Castor californicus
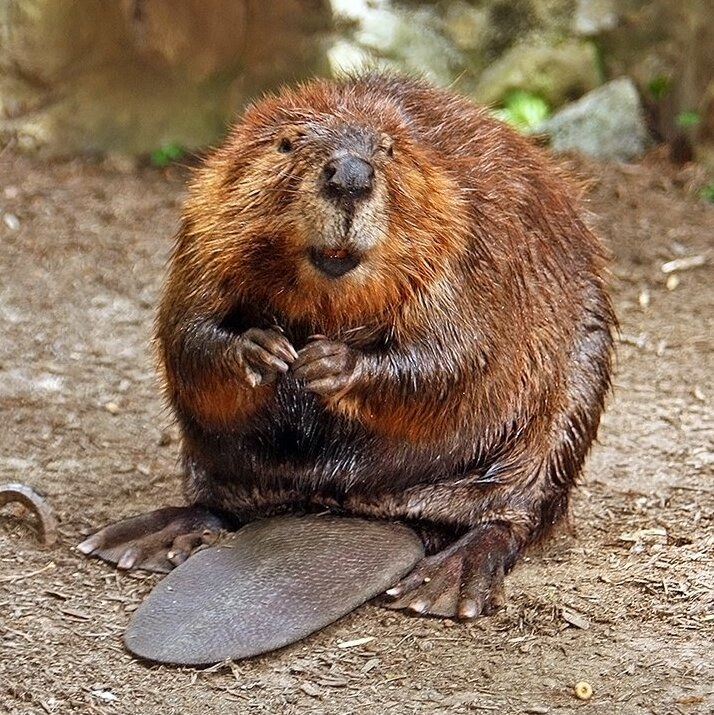
  - A living Castor canadensis, or North American beaver
    †Castor canadensis
- †Catalpa
  - †Catalpa rubyensis – type locality for species
- †Catopsalis
  - †Catopsalis alexanderi
  - †Catopsalis waddleae
- Ceanothus
  - †Ceanothus prespinosus
  - †Ceanothus variabilis
- Cedrela
  - †Cedrela lancifolia
  - †Cedrela pteraformis
- †Celastrus
  - †Celastrus typicus
- Celtis
  - †Celtis aspera
  - †Celtis aspera (Newberry)
  - †Celtis chaneyi
  - †Celtis kansana
  - †Celtis mccoshii
  - †Celtis peracuminata
- †Centetodon
  - †Centetodon kuenzii – type locality for species
  - †Centetodon magnus
- Cercidiphyllum
  - †Cercidiphyllum arcticum
  - †Cercidiphyllum articum
  - †Cercidiphyllum crenatum
  - †Cercidiphyllum elongatum
  - †Cercidiphyllum genetrix
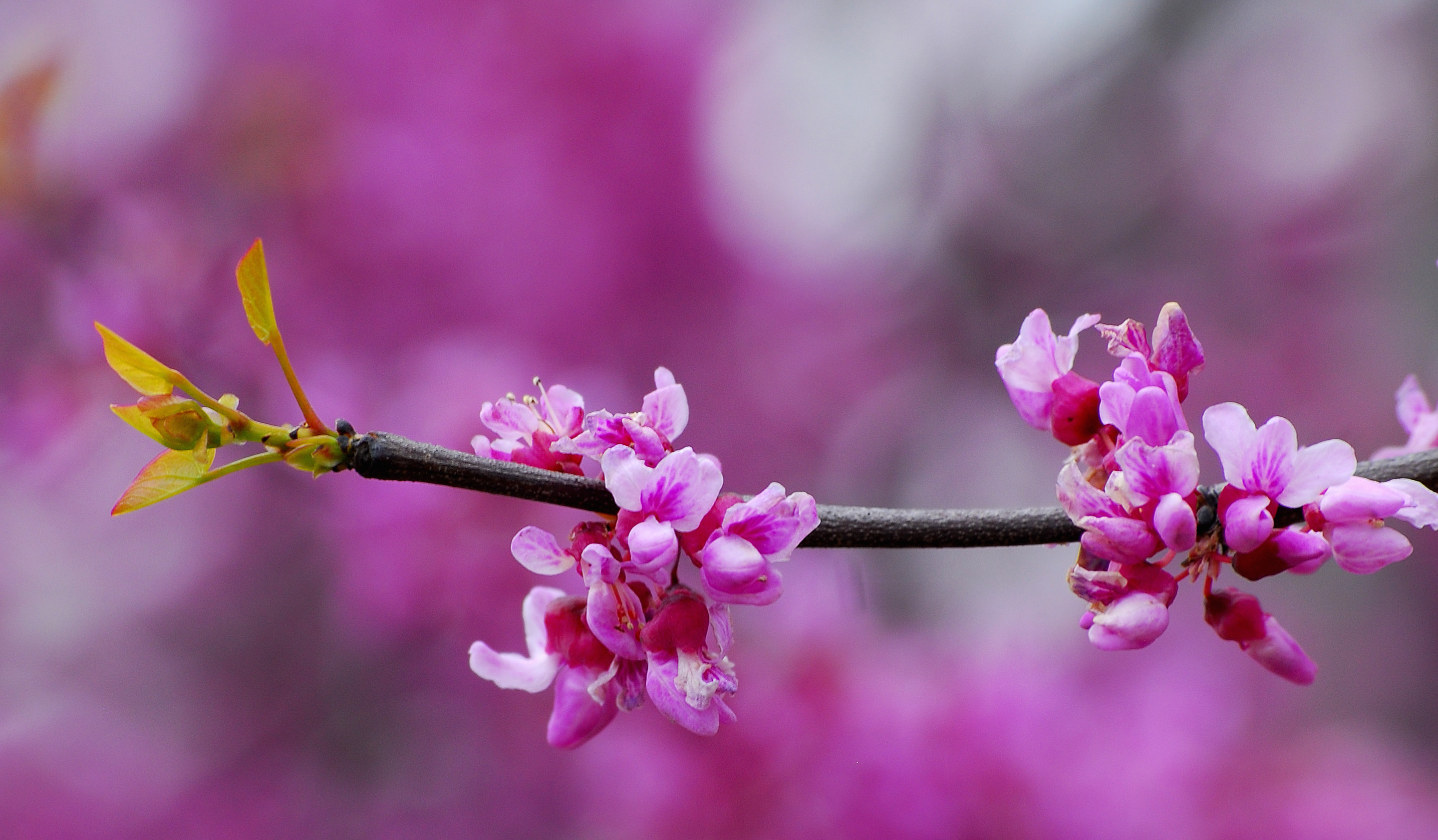
- Flowers of a living Cercis or redbud tree
  Cercis
  - †Cercis parvifolia
  - †Cercis spokanensis
- †Cercocarpus
  - †Cercocarpus antiquus
  - †Cercocarpus beaannae
  - †Cercocarpus myricaefolius
- †Chadrolagus
  - †Chadrolagus emryi
- †Chaetoptelea
  - †Chaetoptelea microphylla
- †Chamaecyparis
  - †Chamaecyparis linguaefolia
- †Chamops
  - †Chamops segnis – or unidentified comparable form
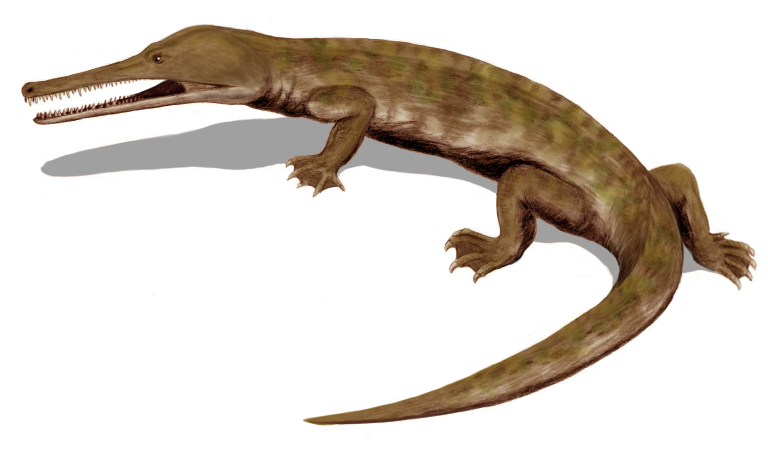
- Life restoration of the Late Cretaceous-Eocene choristoderan reptile Champsosaurus
  †Champsosaurus
- †Chiromyoides
  - †Chiromyoides potior
- †Chisternon
  - †Chisternon interpositum – type locality for species
- †Chriacus
  - †Chriacus baldwini
  - †Chriacus calenancus
  - †Chriacus pelvidens
  - †Chriacus punitor
- †Chthonophis – type locality for genus
  - †Chthonophis subterraneus – type locality for species
- †Cimexomys
  - †Cimexomys minor – type locality for species
- †Cimolestes
  - †Cimolestes incisus
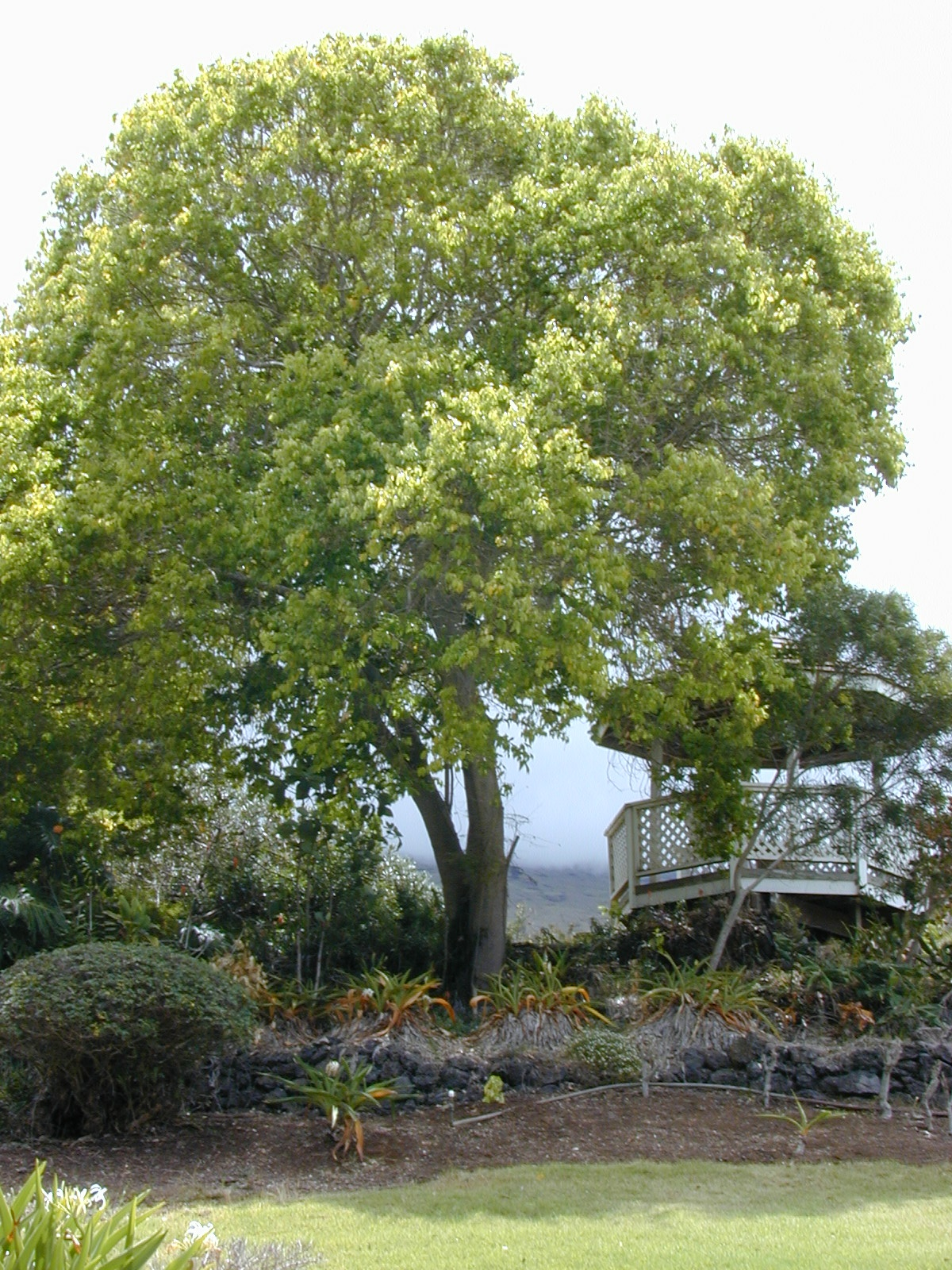
- A living Cinnamomum, or cinnamon tree
  Cinnamomum
  - †Cinnamomum sezannense
- Cissus
  - †Cissus marginata
- †Claenodon
  - †Claenodon montanensis
- Clematis
  - †Clematis ellensburgensis
- Cocculus
  - †Cocculus heteromorpha
- †Colodon
  - †Colodon cingulatus
  - †Colodon kayi – type locality for species
  - †Colodon woodi – or unidentified comparable form
- †Colpoclaenus
  - †Colpoclaenus keeferi – tentative report
  - †Colpoclaenus procyonoides – or unidentified comparable form
- †Colubrina
  - †Colubrina asiatica – or unidentified comparable form
  - †Colubrina preelliptica
- †Compsemys
  - †Compsemys victa
- †Coniferites
  - †Coniferites conicus – type locality for species
  - †Coniferites ovatus – type locality for species
  - †Coniferites strobiliformis – type locality for species
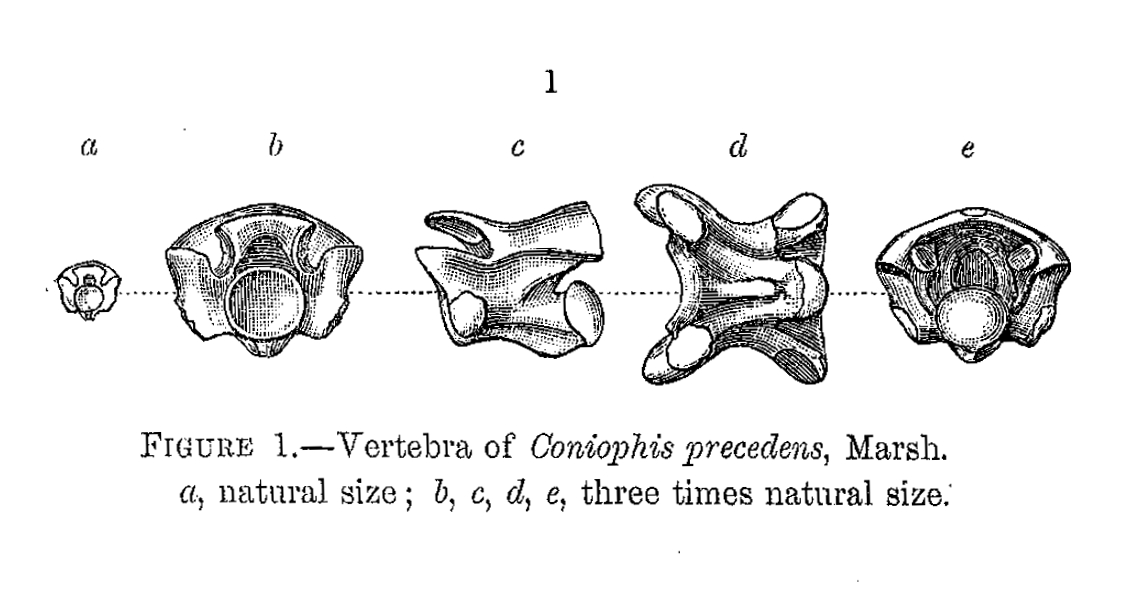
- Illustration of fossilized vertebrae of the Late Cretaceous-Eocene snake Coniophis. Othniel Charles Marsh (1892).
  †Coniophis – or unidentified comparable form
  - †Coniophis precedens
- †Contogenys
  - †Contogenys ekalakaensis – type locality for species
  - †Contogenys sloani
- †Conzattia
  - †Conzattia coriacea
- †Copedelphys
  - †Copedelphys stevensoni – or unidentified comparable form
  - †Copedelphys titanelix – type locality for species
- †Copemys
  - †Copemys lindsayi – type locality for species
- †Coriphagus
  - †Coriphagus montanus – type locality for species
- Cornus
  - †Cornus cornella
  - †Cornus hyperborea
  - †Cornus ovalis
- †Corylus
  - †Corylus insignis
- †Coryphodon
  - †Coryphodon proterus – type locality for species
- †Cosmocomoidea
  - †Cosmocomoidea greenwalti – type locality for species
  - †Cosmocomoidea kootenai – type locality for species
  - †Cosmocomoidea rasnitsyni – type locality for species
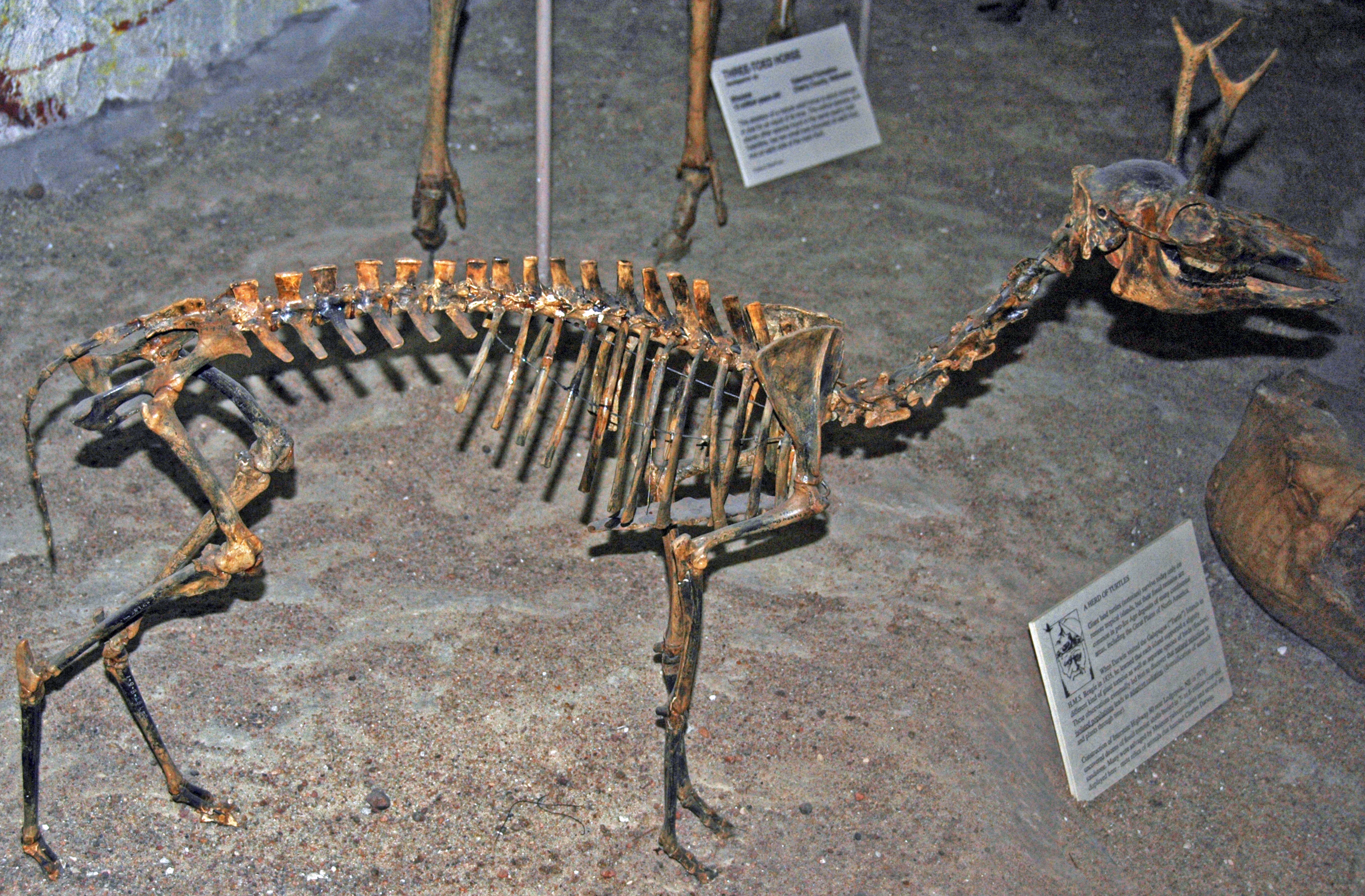
- Fossilized skeleton of the Miocene pronghorn-relative Cosoryx
  †Cosoryx – tentative report
- Crataegus
  - †Crataegus elwyni
  - †Crataegus pacifica
- †Credneria
  - †Credneria daturaefolia
- Crematogaster
  - †Crematogaster aurora – type locality for species
- †Crustulus – type locality for genus
  - †Crustulus fontanus – type locality for species
- †Cryptoryctes – type locality for genus
  - †Cryptoryctes kayi – type locality for species
- Culiseta
  - †Culiseta kishenehn – type locality for species
  - †Culiseta lemniscata – type locality for species
- †Cupidinimus
  - †Cupidinimus halli – type locality for species
- †Cyclurus
  - †Cyclurus fragosus
- †Cylindrodon – type locality for genus
  - †Cylindrodon fontis – type locality for species
- †Cynodesmus
  - †Cynodesmus thooides – type locality for species
- Cynomys
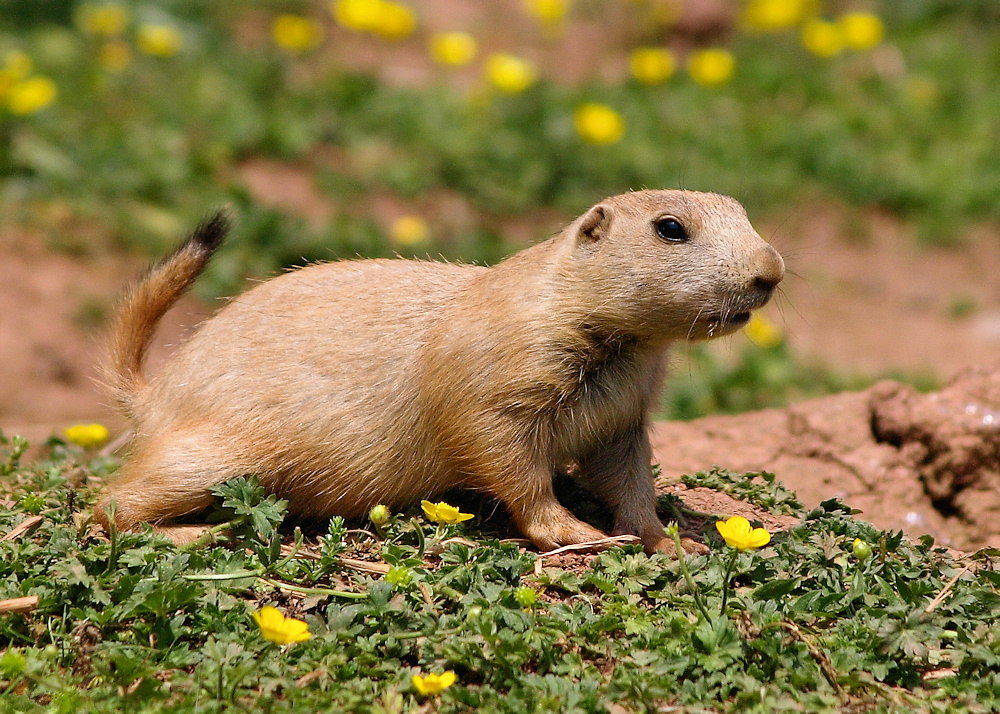
  - A living Cynomys ludovicianus, or black-tailed prairie dog
    †Cynomys ludovicianus

== D ==
- †Dalbergia
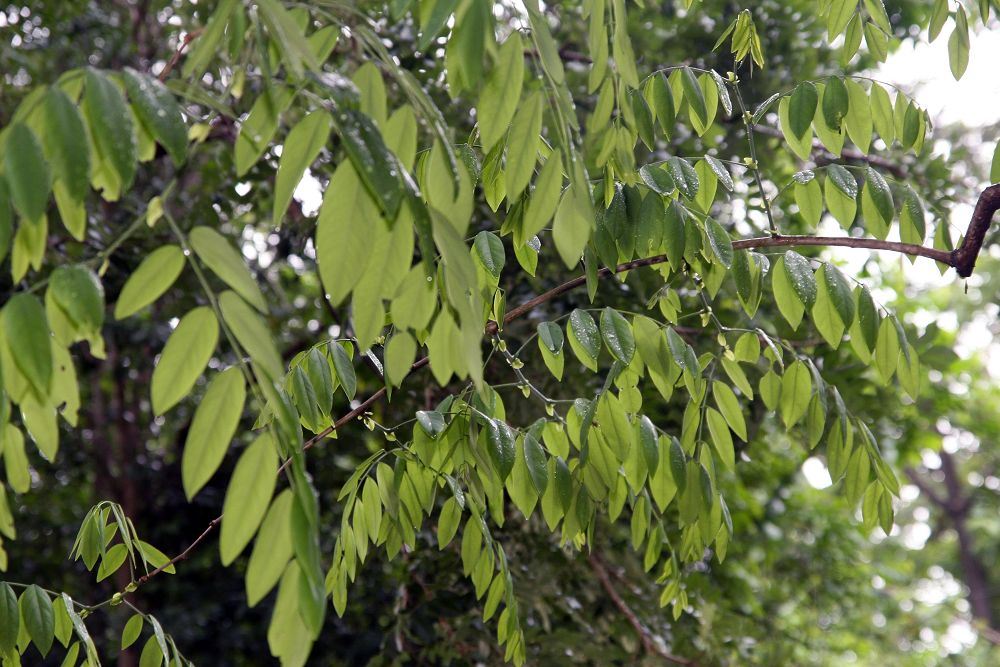
  - Foliage of a living Dalbergia retusa tree
    †Dalbergia retusa
- †Daphoenictis – or unidentified comparable form
- †Davidia
  - †Davidia antiqua
- †Davispia – type locality for genus
  - †Davispia bearcreekensis – type locality for species
- †Derrisemys – type locality for genus
  - †Derrisemys sterea – type locality for species
- †Desmatochoerus
  - †Desmatochoerus hatcheri – type locality for species
- †Desmatolagus – tentative report
- †Deuterogonodon
  - †Deuterogonodon montanus – type locality for species
- †Diceratherium
  - †Diceratherium annectens
  - †Diceratherium armatum
  - †Diceratherium radtkei – type locality for species
- †Didymictis
- †Dillerlemur
  - †Dillerlemur pagei – type locality for species
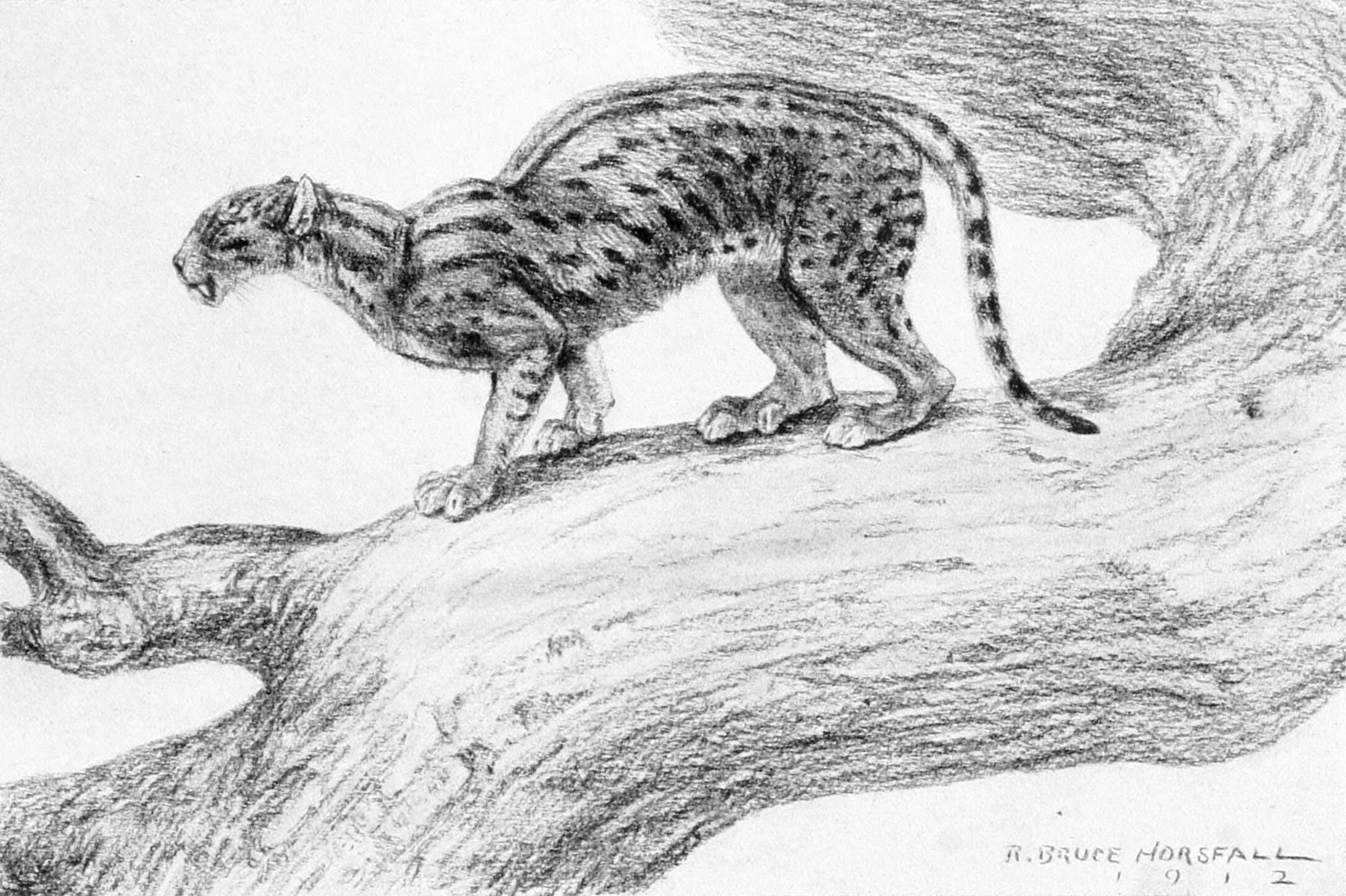
- Life restoration of the Eocene-Miocene false saber-toothed cat Dinictis. Robert Bruce Horsfall (1913).
  †Dinictis
- †Dinohippus
- †Dioctria – tentative report
  - †Dioctria jamesi – type locality for species
- †Diospyros
  - †Diospyros oregoniana
- †Diphysa
  - †Diphysa presuberosa
- †Diplodipelta – type locality for genus
  - †Diplodipelta reniptera
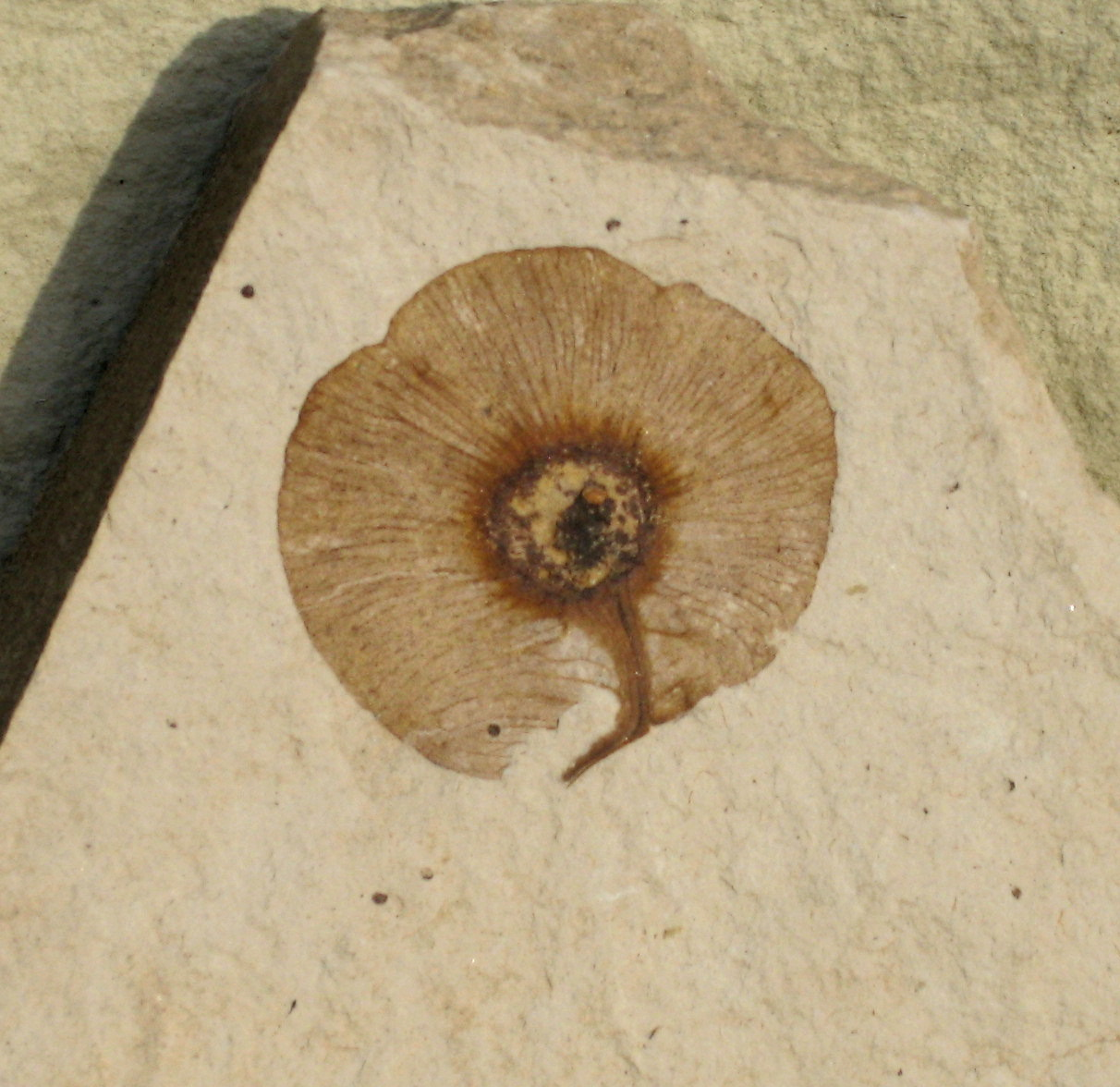
- Fossilized samara of the Eocene-modern Dipteronia tree
  Dipteronia
  - †Dipteronia insignis
- †Dissacus
- †Dixella
  - †Dixella curvistyla – type locality for species
  - †Dixella eomarginata – type locality for species
  - †Dixella intacta – type locality for species
  - †Dixella spinilobata – type locality for species
- Dolichoderus
  - †Dolichoderus dlusskyi – type locality for species
- †Domnina
  - †Domnina gradata – or unidentified comparable form
  - †Domnina thompsoni – type locality for species
- †Domninoides
- †Dorraletes
  - †Dorraletes diminutivus
- †Douglassciurus
  - †Douglassciurus jeffersoni – type locality for species
- †Downsimus
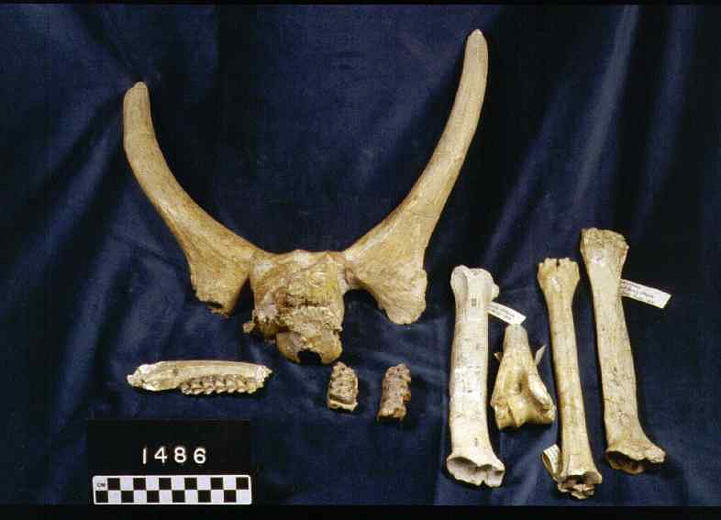
- Fossilized horns, jaws, and limb bones of the Miocene deer relative Dromomeryx
  †Dromomeryx
  - †Dromomeryx borealis
- †Dryinoides – type locality for genus
  - †Dryinoides oxyrhachis – type locality for species
- Dryopteris
  - †Dryopteris lakesi
  - †Dryopteris serrata

== E ==
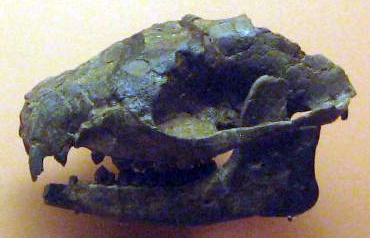
- Fossilized skull of the Paleocene-Eocene mammal Ectocion
  †Ectocion
  - †Ectocion cedrus
  - †Ectocion collinus
- †Ectoganus
  - †Ectoganus lobdelli
- †Ectypodus
  - †Ectypodus aphronorus – type locality for species
  - †Ectypodus laytoni – or unidentified comparable form
  - †Ectypodus lovei
  - †Ectypodus powelli – or unidentified comparable form
  - †Ectypodus szalayi – type locality for species
- †Ellipsodon
  - †Ellipsodon lemuroides
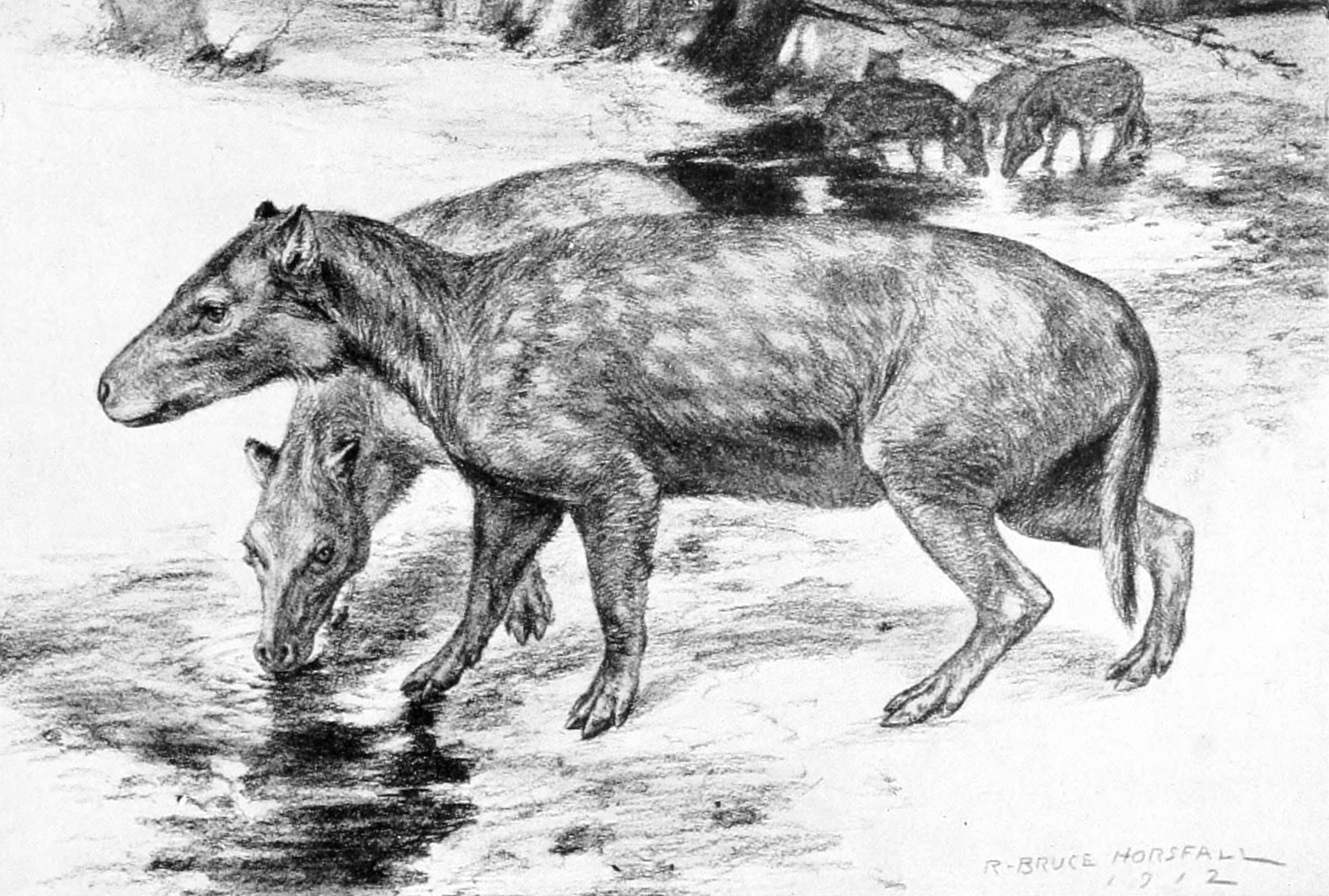
- Life restoration of the Eocene-Oligocene anthracothere mammal Elomeryx
  †Elomeryx – tentative report
- †Elphidotarsius
  - †Elphidotarsius florencae – type locality for species
  - †Elphidotarsius russelli
- †Elpidophorus
  - †Elpidophorus elegans
  - †Elpidophorus minor – type locality for species
- †Entoptychus
  - †Entoptychus montanensis
- †Eoanaphes – type locality for genus
  - †Eoanaphes stethynioides – type locality for species
- †Eoanomala – type locality for genus
  - †Eoanomala melas – type locality for species
- †Eoconodon
  - †Eoconodon hutchisoni
  - †Eoconodon nidhoggi
- †Eoeustochus – type locality for genus
  - †Eoeustochus borchersi – type locality for species
  - †Eoeustochus kishenehn – type locality for species
- †Eoformica
  - †Eoformica brevipetiola – type locality for species
  - †Eoformica latimedia – type locality for species
  - †Eoformica pinguis
- †Eogyropsylla
  - †Eogyropsylla paveloctogenarius – type locality for species
- †Eolestes
  - †Eolestes ramosus – type locality for species
  - †Eolestes syntheticus
- †Eotitanops
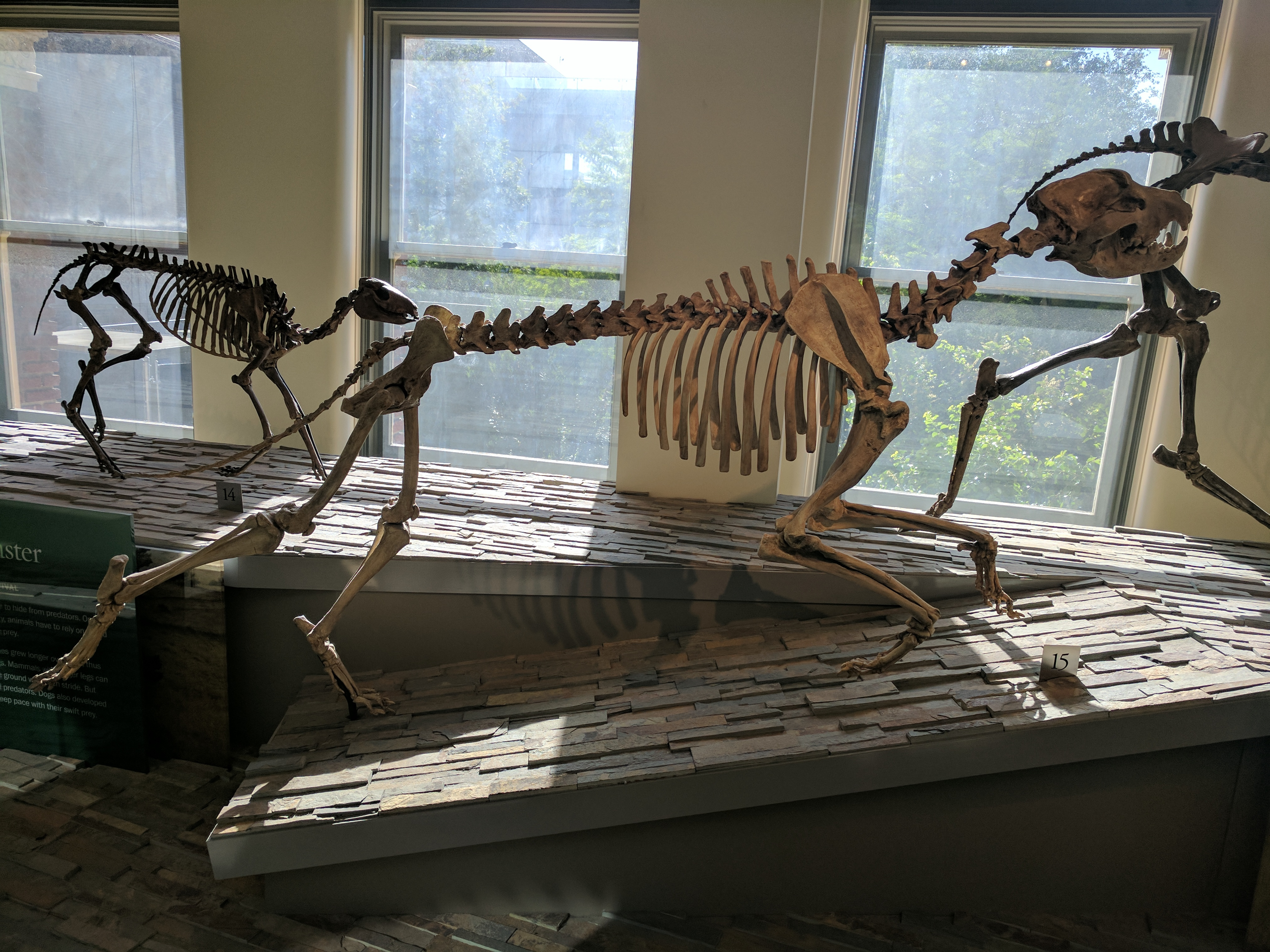
- Mounted fossilized skeleton of the Miocene bone-crushing dog Epicyon
  †Epicyon
  - †Epicyon haydeni
- †Epihippus
  - †Epihippus gracilis – or unidentified comparable form
- †Epoicotherium
  - †Epoicotherium unicum
- †Equisetum
  - †Equisetum aquatile – type locality for species
  - †Equisetum arcticum
  - †Equisetum octangulatum
- Equus
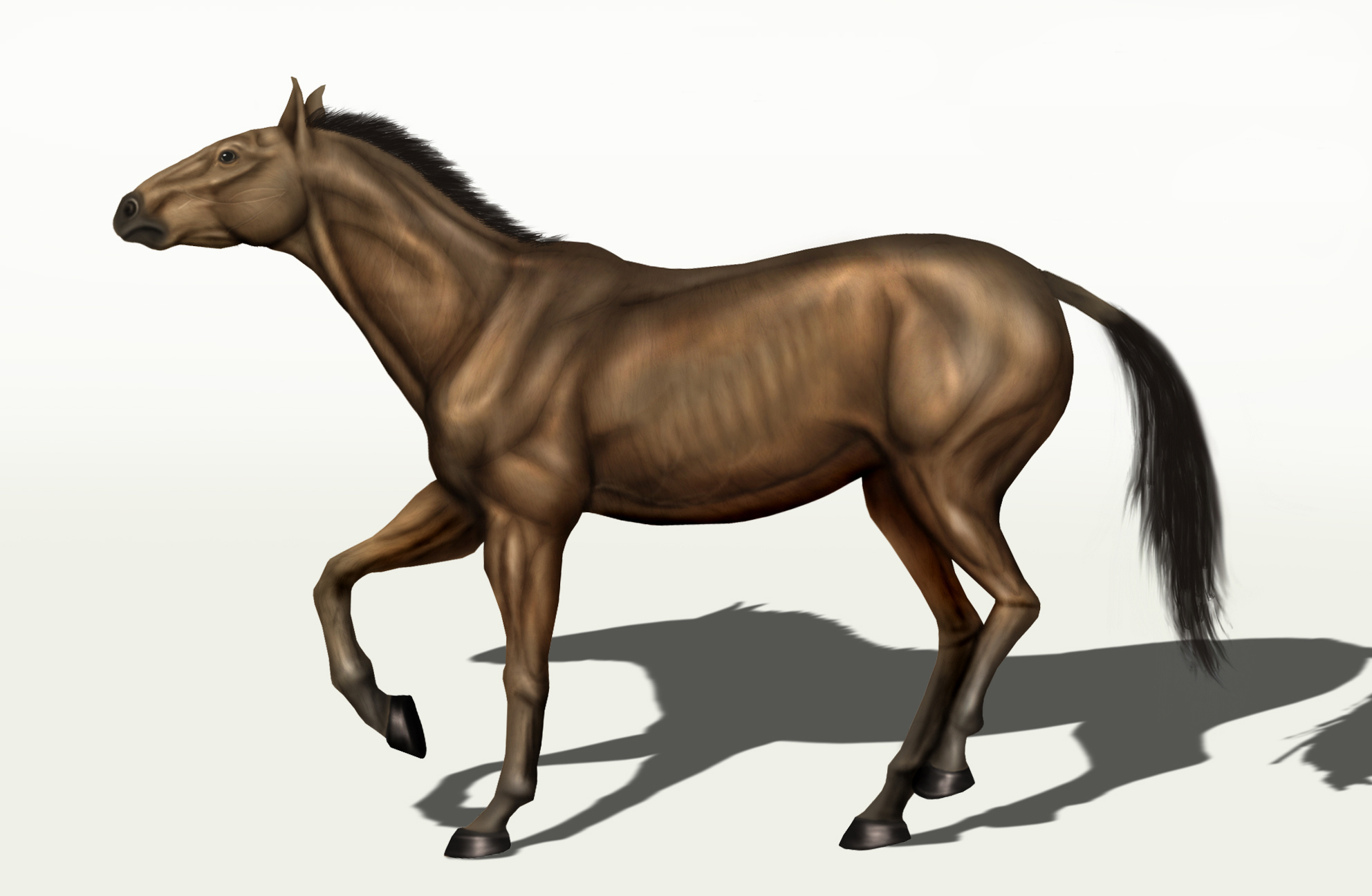
  - Life restoration of the Pleistocene-Holocene Equus conversidens, or Mexican horse
    †Equus conversidens – or unidentified comparable form
  - †Equus proversus
- Erucius – tentative report
  - †Erucius lewisi – type locality for species
- †Eucastor
  - †Eucastor tortus
- †Eucommia
  - †Eucommia montana
  - †Eucommia serrata
- †Eudaemonema
  - †Eudaemonema cuspidata – type locality for species
- †Euhapsis – tentative report
- †Eumys
  - †Eumys brachyodus
  - †Eumys elegans
  - †Eumys parvidens – or unidentified comparable form
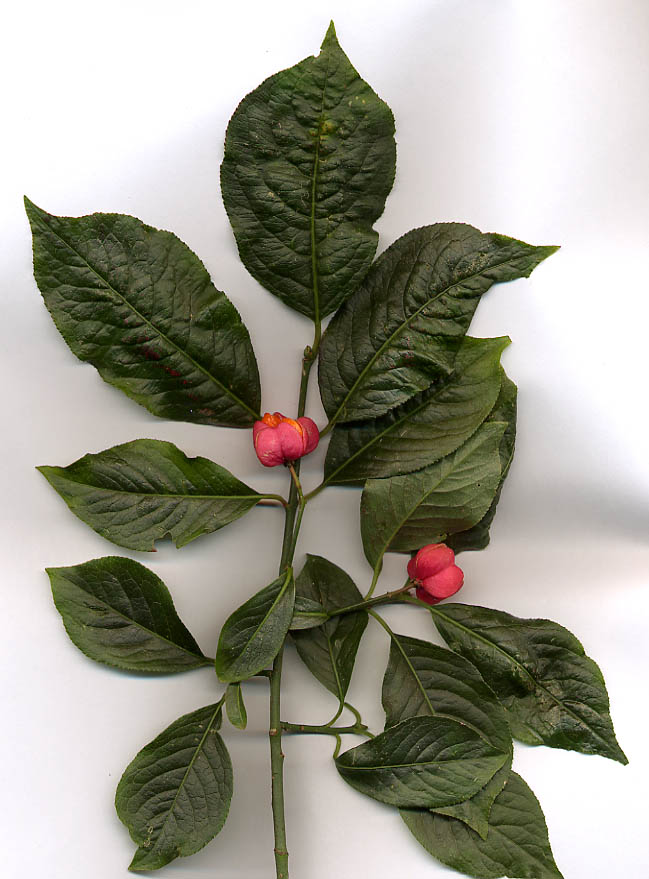
- Foliage and fruit of a modern Euonymus
  †Euonymus
  - †Euonymus pacificus
- †Euoplocyon
  - †Euoplocyon brachygnathus
- †Euroxenomys
  - †Euroxenomys inconnexus – type locality for species
- †Eutypomys
  - †Eutypomys inexpectatus – or unidentified comparable form
  - †Eutypomys montanensis – type locality for species
  - †Eutypomys parvus
- Exbucklandia
  - †Exbucklandia oregonensis
- Exechia – or unidentified related form
- †Exostinus
  - †Exostinus lancensis

== F ==
- †Fagopsis
  - †Fagopsis longifolia
- Ficus
  - †Ficus affinis
  - †Ficus artocarpoides
  - †Ficus planicostata
  - †Ficus subtruncata
- Fidiobia
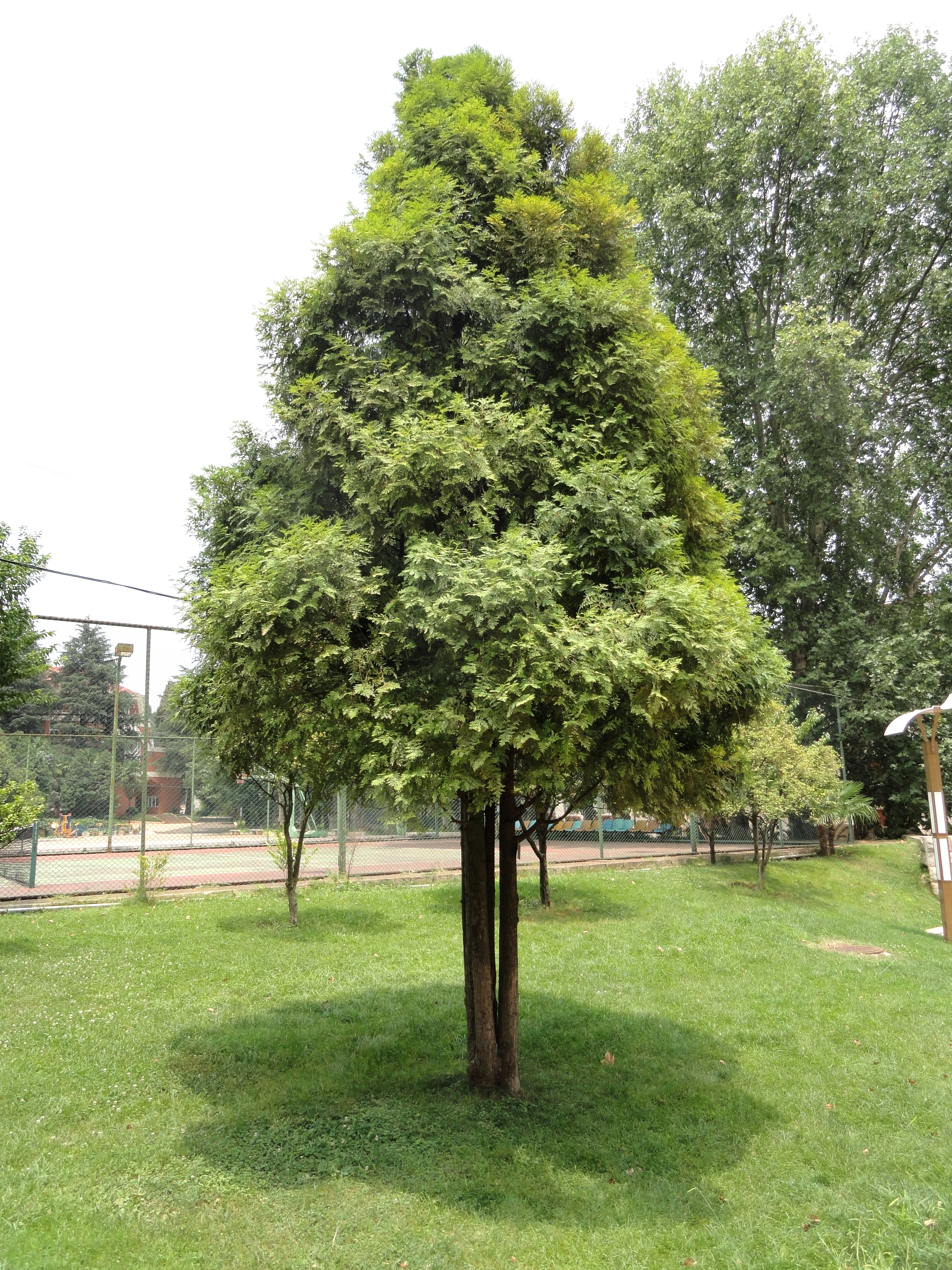
- A living Fokienia cypress tree
  Fokienia
  - †Fokienia catenulata
- Formica
  - †Formica annosa – type locality for species
- †Fraxinus
  - †Fraxinus brevialata
  - †Fraxinus eocenica
  - †Fraxinus flexifolia
  - †Fraxinus rupinarum

== G ==
- †Galbreathia
  - †Galbreathia bettae
- †Gelastops
  - †Gelastops parcus – type locality for species
- Geochelone
  - †Geochelone primaeva – type locality for species
- Gerrhonotus – or unidentified comparable form
- †Gingerichia – type locality for genus
  - †Gingerichia geoteretes – type locality for species
- Ginkgo
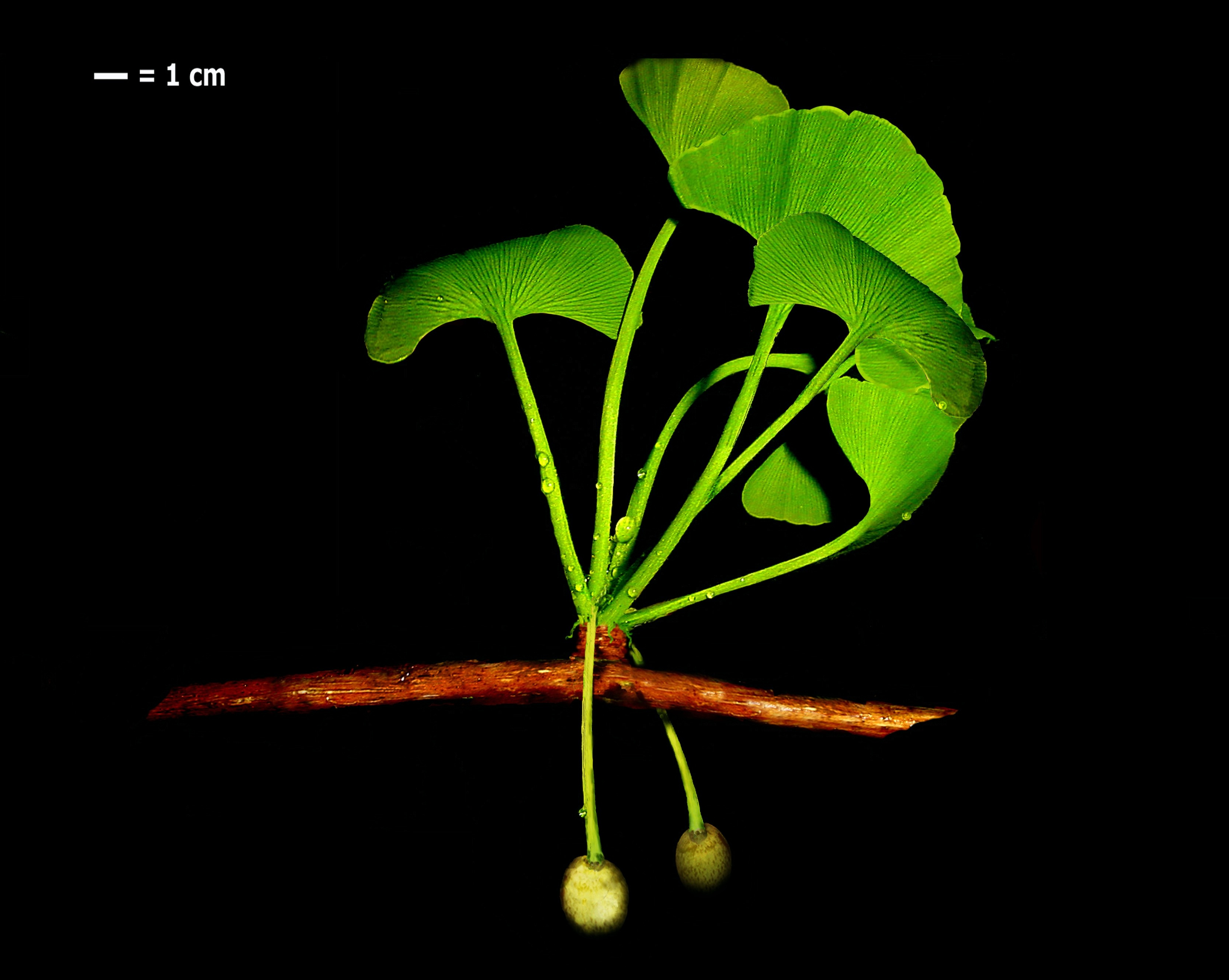
  - Restored foliage of the Late Cretaceous-Miocene ginkgo tree Ginkgo adiantoides
    †Ginkgo adiantoides
- Gleichenia
  - †Gleichenia hesperia
- Glyptostrobus
  - †Glyptostrobus nordenskioldi
  - †Glyptostrobus oregonensis
- †Goniacodon
  - †Goniacodon levisanus
- †Gregorymys
  - †Gregorymys douglassi – type locality for species
- †Gripholagomys – tentative report

== H ==
- †Habrosaurus
  - †Habrosaurus dilatus
- †Hamamelites
  - †Hamamelites inaequalis
- †Haplaletes
  - †Haplaletes andakupensis
  - †Haplaletes disceptatrix – type locality for species
- †Haplomylus
  - †Haplomylus palustris – type locality for species
- †Helaletes
  - †Helaletes nanus
- †Heliscomys
  - †Heliscomys gregoryi
  - †Heliscomys mcgrewi – or unidentified comparable form
  - †Heliscomys ostranderi
- Helius
  - †Helius constenius – type locality for species
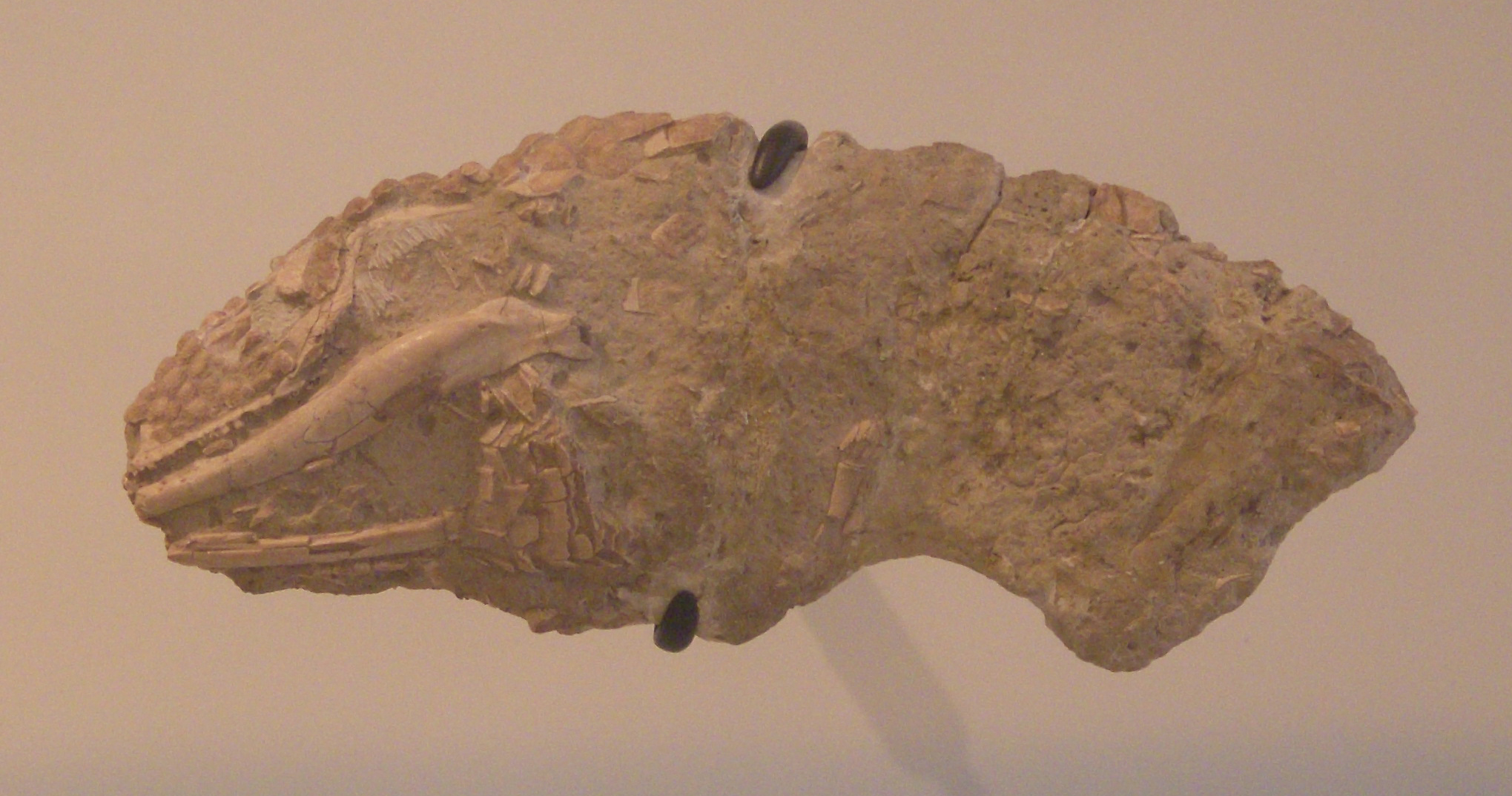
- Fossilized skull of the Oligocene lizard Helodermoides
  †Helodermoides – type locality for genus
  - †Helodermoides tuberculatus – type locality for species
- †Hendryomeryx
  - †Hendryomeryx defordi – or unidentified comparable form
- †Herpetotherium
  - †Herpetotherium fugax
  - †Herpetotherium knighti – or unidentified comparable form
  - †Herpetotherium valens
- †Hesperhys
  - †Hesperhys vagrans
- Hesperinus – or unidentified related form
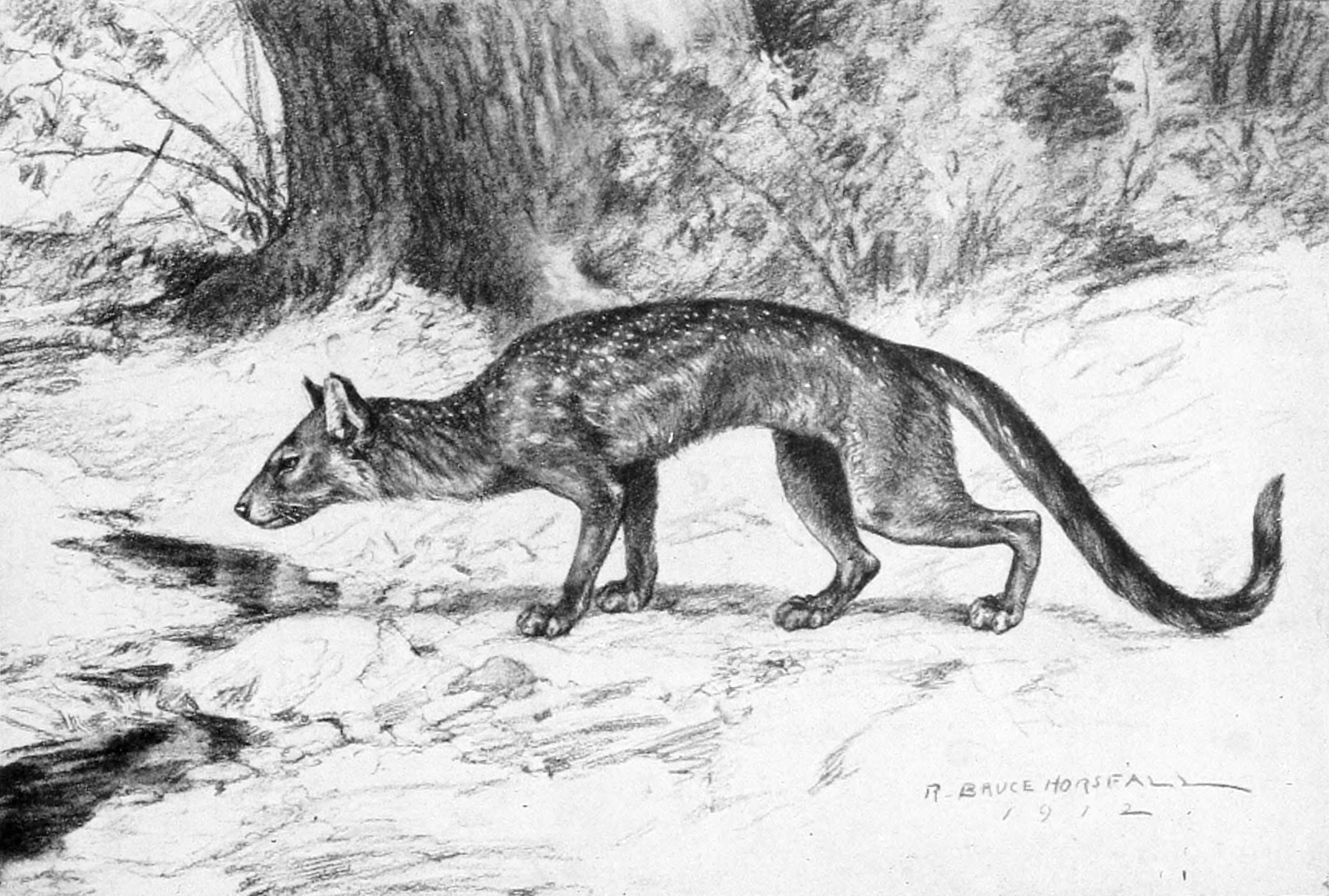
- Life restoration of the Eocene-Oligocene dog Hesperocyon. Robert Bruce Horsfall (1913).
  †Hesperocyon
  - †Hesperocyon gregarius
- †Heteraletes
  - †Heteraletes leotanus
- †Hiodon
  - †Hiodon consteniorum – type locality for species
- Holmskioldia
  - †Holmskioldia speiri
- †Holopogon
  - †Holopogon archilestes – type locality for species
- Homo
  - †Homo sapiens
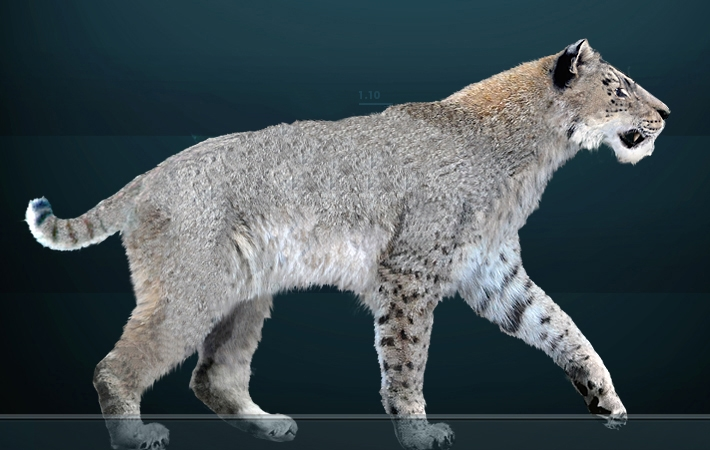
- Restoration of Pliocene-Pleistocene Homotherium, or scimitar cat
  †Homotherium
  - †Homotherium serum
- †Huerfanodon – or unidentified comparable form
- †Hutchemys – type locality for genus
  - †Hutchemys rememdium – type locality for species
- †Hyaenodon
  - †Hyaenodon crucians
- Hydrangea
  - †Hydrangea knowltoni
- †Hydromystria
  - †Hydromystria expansa
- †Hyopsodus
  - †Hyopsodus sholemi
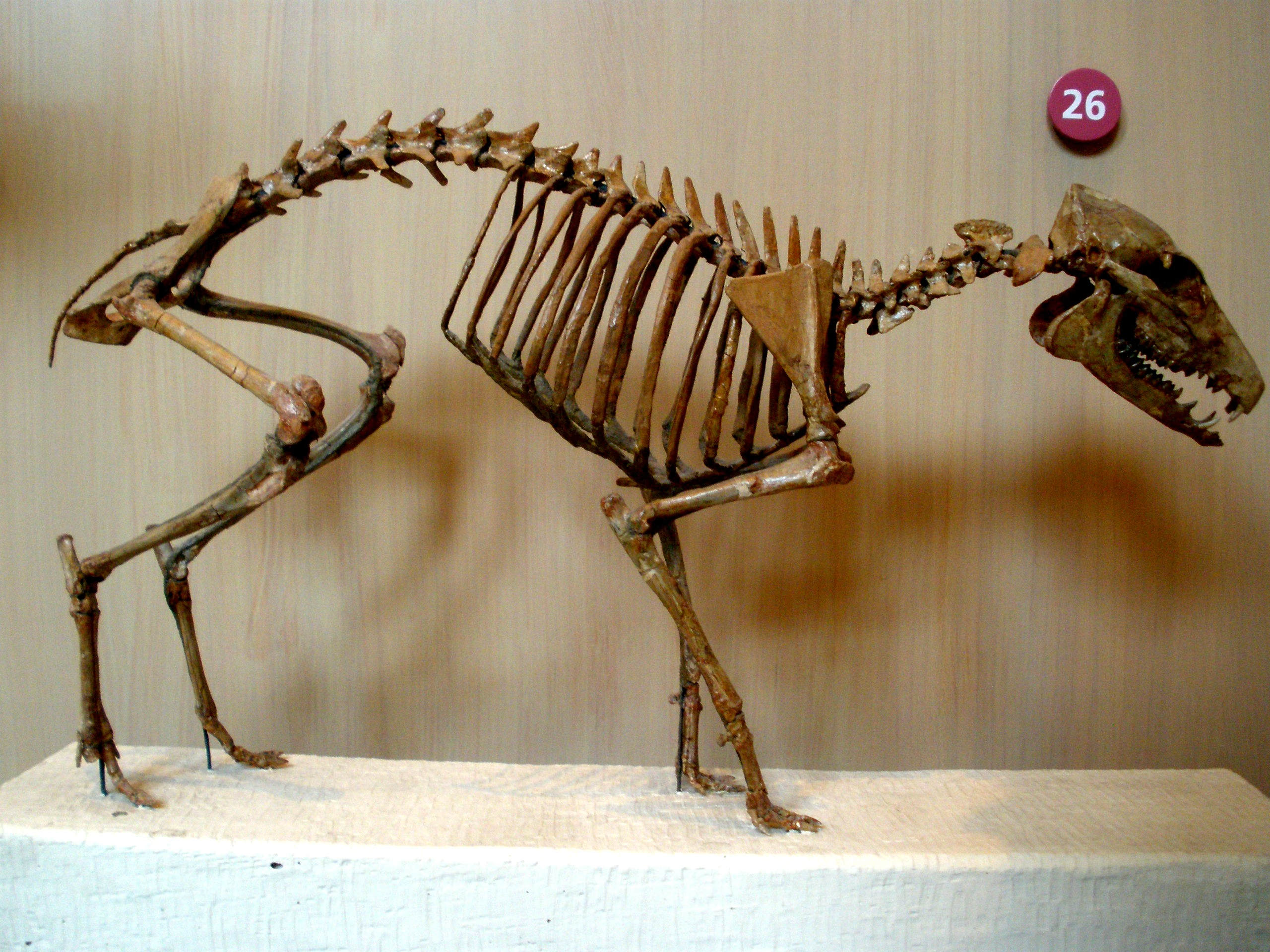
- Mounted fossilized skeleton of the Eocene-Miocene even-toed ungulate Hypertragulus
  †Hypertragulus
  - †Hypertragulus calcaratus
- †Hypisodus
  - †Hypisodus minimus
- †Hypohippus
  - †Hypohippus osborni – or unidentified comparable form
- †Hypolagus
  - †Hypolagus vetus
- †Hypsiops
  - †Hypsiops breviceps – type locality for species
- †Hyrachyus
  - †Hyrachyus douglassi – type locality for species
- †Hyracodon
  - †Hyracodon medius
  - †Hyracodon priscidens

== I ==
- †Ictidopappus
  - †Ictidopappus mustelinus – type locality for species
- †Ignacius
  - †Ignacius frugivorus
- †Ilex
  - †Ilex acuminata – later renamed Ilex mormonica
  - †Ilex mormonica – type locality for species. Formerly known as Ilex acuminata.
- †Intyrictis
  - †Intyrictis vanvaleni
- †Ischyrhiza – or unidentified comparable form
  - †Ischyrhiza avonicola
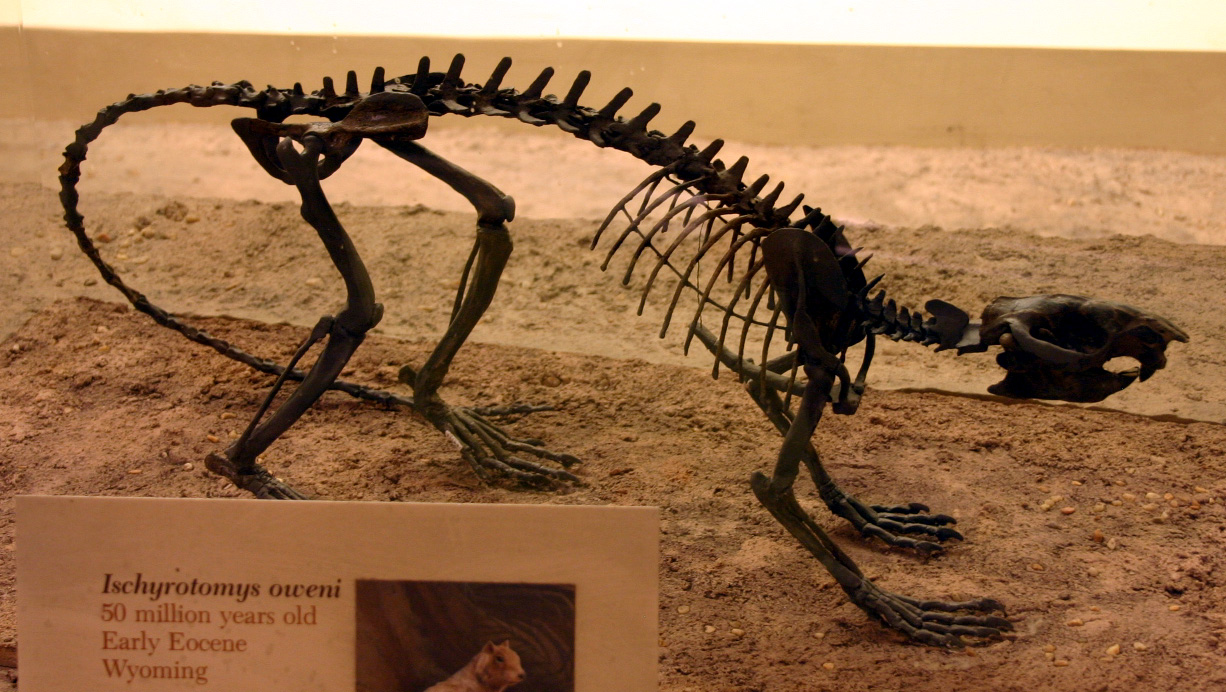
- Mounted fossilized skeleton of the Eocene-Oligocene rodent Ischyromys
  †Ischyromys
  - †Ischyromys douglassi – type locality for species
  - †Ischyromys typus
  - †Ischyromys veterior – type locality for species
- Isoetes
  - †Isoetes trullata – type locality for species
- †Isoetites
  - †Isoetites horridus
- Isonychia
  - †Isonychia alderensis – type locality for species

== J ==
- †Jepsenella – type locality for genus
  - †Jepsenella praepropera – type locality for species
- †Judithemys
  - †Judithemys backmani
- †Juglandicarya
- †Juglandiphyllites
  - †Juglandiphyllites glabra
- Juglans
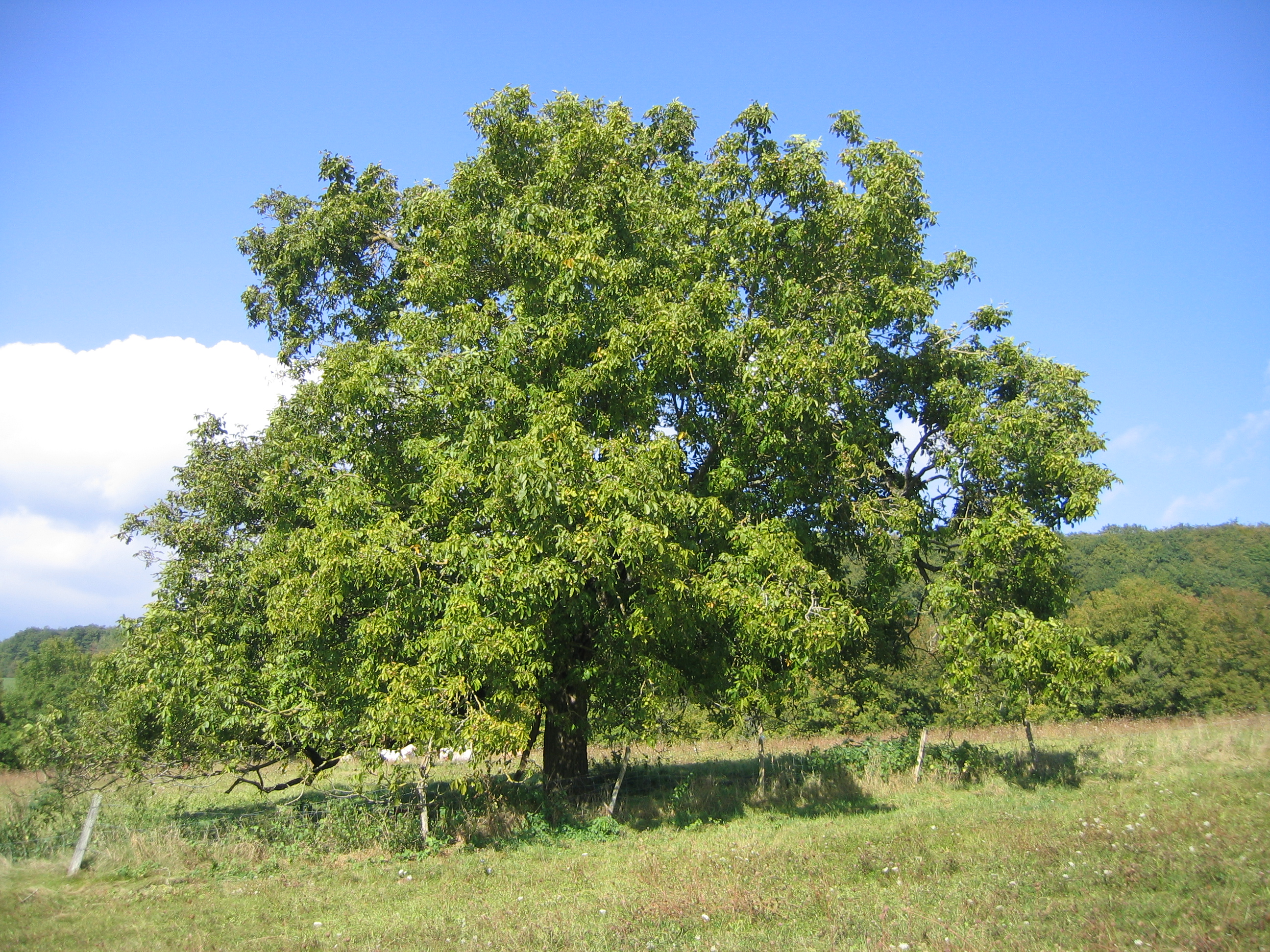
  - A living Juglans regia also known as the Persian or English walnut
    †Juglans regia – or unidentified comparable form
  - †Juglans taurina
- Juniperus
  - †Juniperus nevadensis

== K ==
- †Kerria
  - †Kerria antiqua
- †Kimbetohia
  - †Kimbetohia mziae
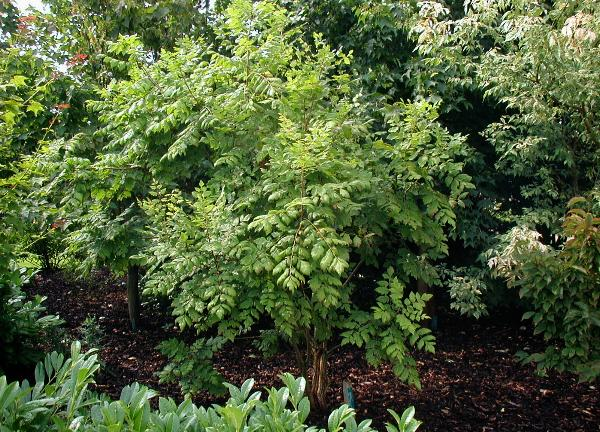
- A living Koelreuteria tree
  Koelreuteria
  - †Koelreuteria arnoldi
  - †Koelreuteria bipinnatoides
- †Ktunaxia – type locality for genus
  - †Ktunaxia jucunda – type locality for species
- †Kukusepasutanka
  - †Kukusepasutanka schultzi

== L ==
- †Labidolemur – type locality for genus
  - †Labidolemur kayi – type locality for species
- Lasius
  - †Lasius glom – type locality for species
- †Lastrea
  - †Lastrea goldiana
- †Latiblattella
  - †Latiblattella avita – type locality for species
- †Laurophyllum
  - †Laurophyllum perseanum
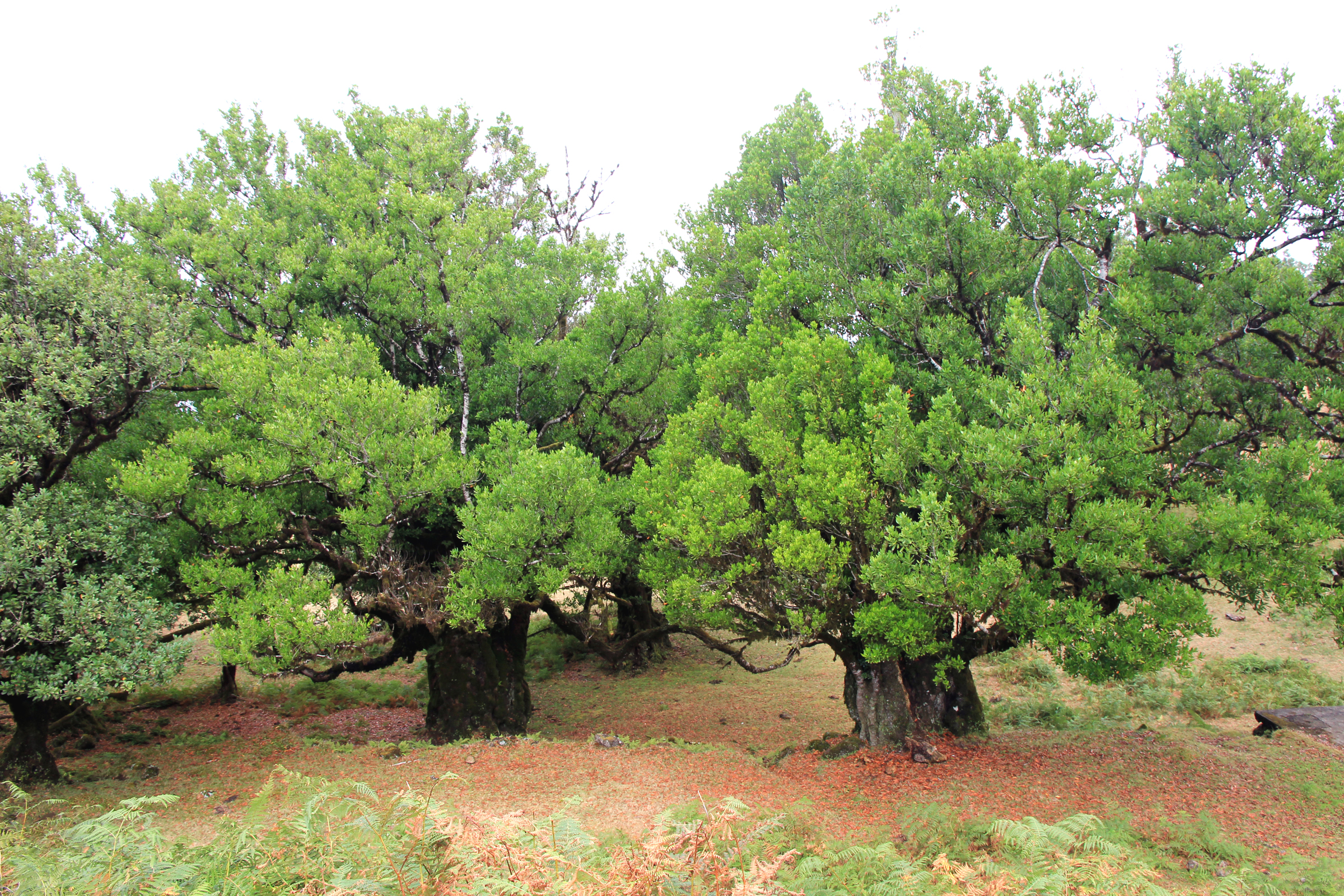
- Living Laurus, or laurel trees
  Laurus
  - †Laurus socialis
- †Leguminosites
- †Leidymys
- †Leipsanolestes
  - †Leipsanolestes siegfriedti
- Lemmiscus
  - †Lemmiscus curtatus
- Lepisosteus
  - †Lepisosteus occidentalis
- †Leptacodon
  - †Leptacodon munusculum – type locality for species
  - †Leptacodon packi – or unidentified comparable form
  - †Leptacodon proserpinae
  - †Leptacodon tener
- †Leptarctus – type locality for genus
  - †Leptarctus primus – type locality for species
- †Leptauchenia
  - †Leptauchenia decora
  - †Leptauchenia major
- †Leptictis
- †Leptochoerus
- †Leptocyon
  - †Leptocyon douglassi – type locality for species
- †Leptodontomys
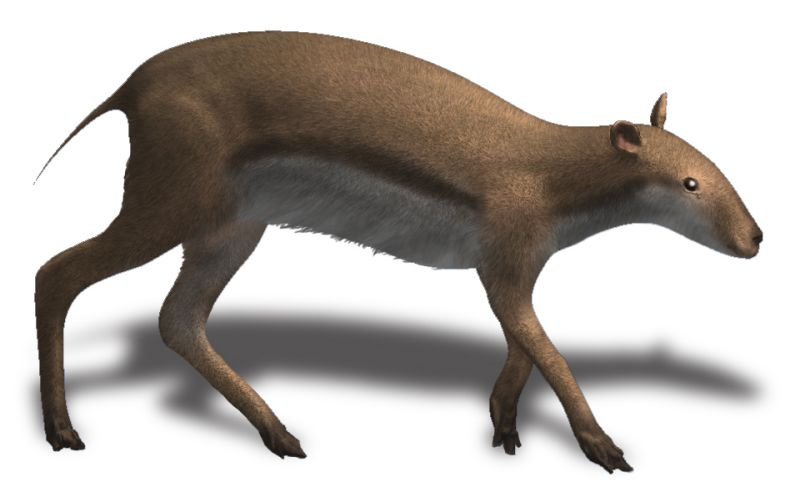
- Life restoration of the Eocene-Oligocene even-toed ungulate Leptomeryx
  †Leptomeryx
  - †Leptomeryx esulcatus
  - †Leptomeryx evansi
  - †Leptomeryx mammifer
  - †Leptomeryx speciosus
  - †Leptomeryx yoderi – or unidentified comparable form
- †Leptonysson – type locality for genus
  - †Leptonysson basiliscus – type locality for species
- †Leptoreodon
  - †Leptoreodon marshi
- †Leucaena
  - †Leucaena californica
- †Lignimus
- †Limnenetes
  - †Limnenetes platyceps – type locality for species
- †Limnoecus
- Lindera
  - †Lindera obtusata
- †Lisserpeton
  - †Lisserpeton bairdi
- †Litaletes
  - †Litaletes disjunctus – type locality for species
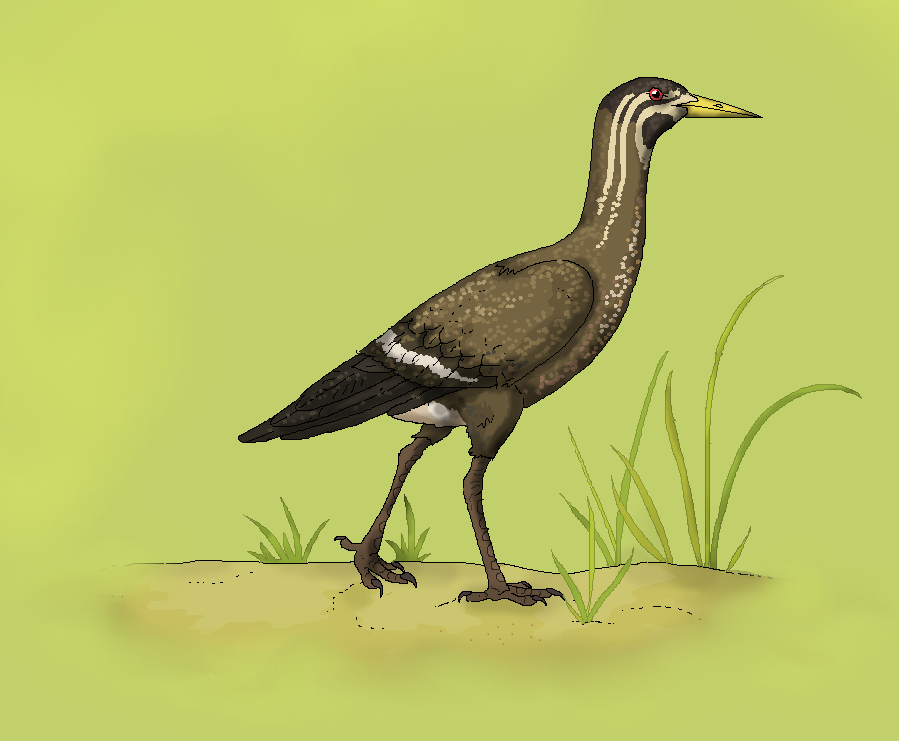
- Life restoration of the Paleocene-Eocene bird Lithornis
  †Lithornis
  - †Lithornis celetius – type locality for species
- †Litocherus
  - †Litocherus lacunatus
  - †Litocherus notissimus – type locality for species
- †Litomylus
  - †Litomylus dissentaneus – type locality for species
  - †Litomylus ishami – or unidentified comparable form
  - †Litomylus orthronepius
- †Loxolophus
  - †Loxolophus pentacus
  - †Loxolophus schizophrenus
- †Lutetialestes – type locality for genus
  - †Lutetialestes uniformis – type locality for species
- Lynx
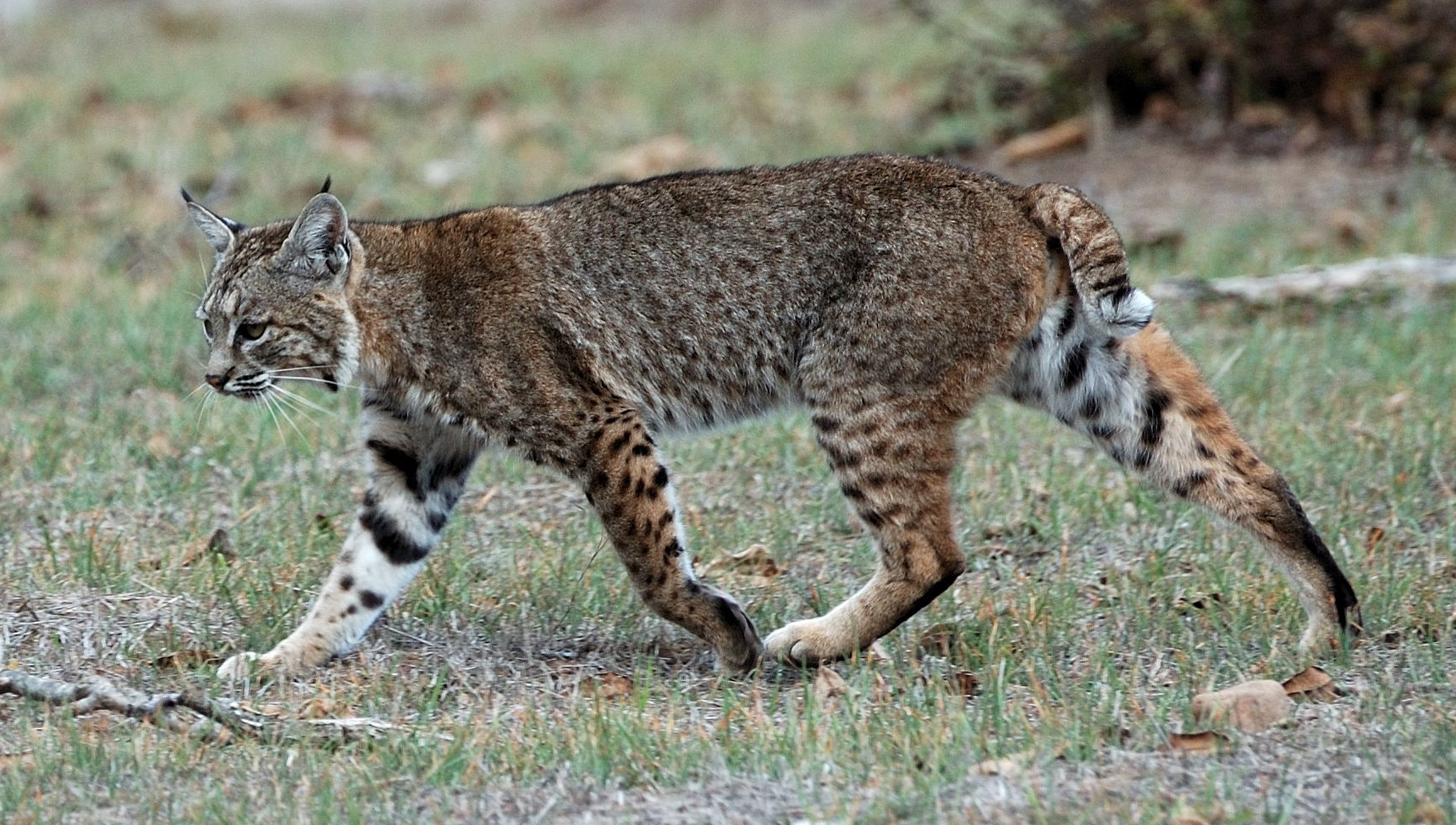
  - A living Lynx rufus, or bobcat
    †Lynx rufus

== M ==
- †Machaerosaurus
  - †Machaerosaurus torrejonensis
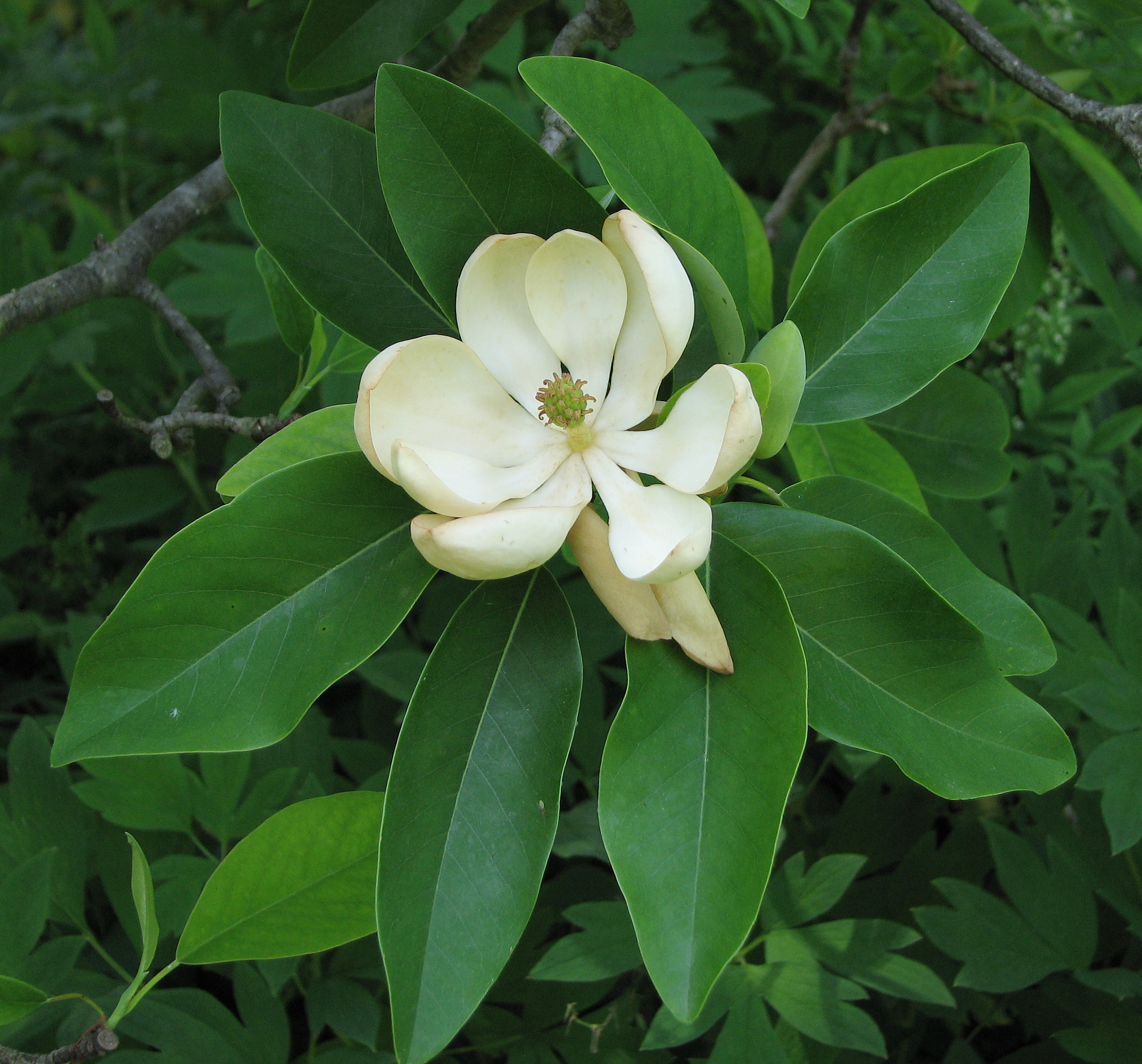
- Close-up view of a Magnolia flower
  Magnolia
  - †Magnolia borealis
  - †Magnolia magnifolia
- Mahonia
  - †Mahonia hakeaeformis
  - †Mahonia limirivuli
  - †Mahonia lobodonta
  - †Mahonia obliqua
  - †Mahonia retculata
  - †Mahonia reticulata
  - †Mahonia simplex
  - †Mahonia subdenticulata
- †Mammut
  - †Mammut americanum
- †Mammuthus
  - †Mammuthus columbi
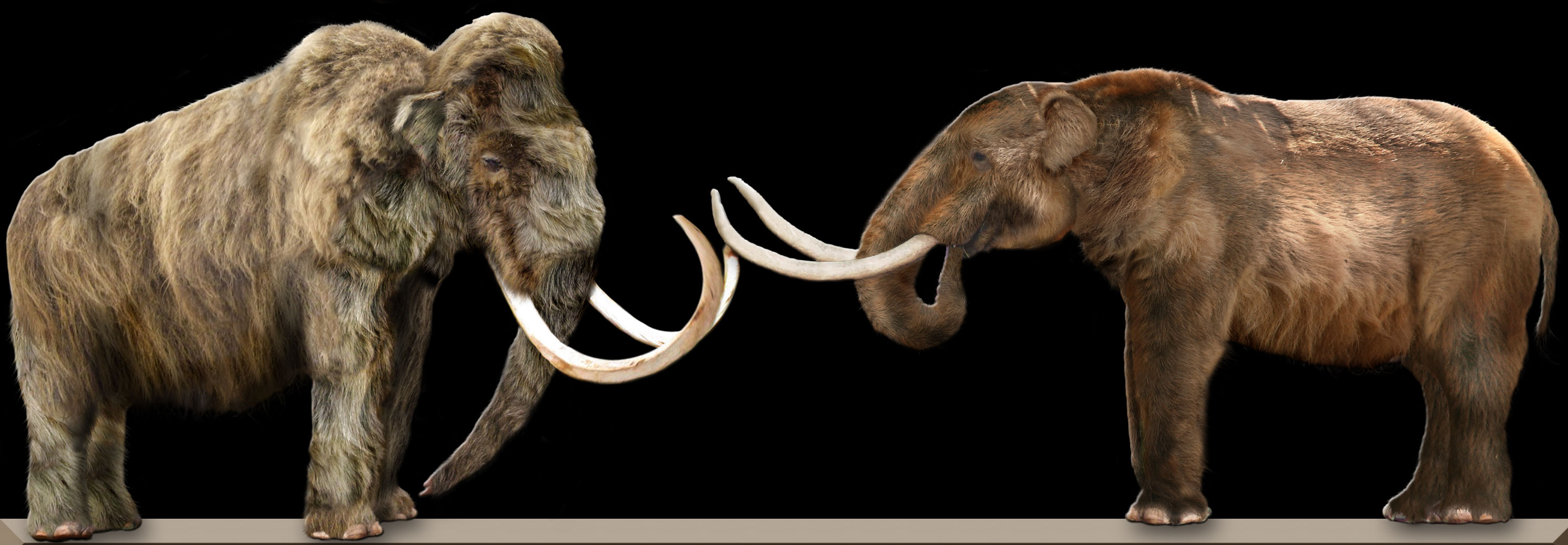
  - Life restorations of a Mammut americanum, or American mastodon (right), and a Mammuthus primigenius, or wooly mammoth (left)
    †Mammuthus primigenius
- Marchantia
  - †Marchantia lignitica
  - †Marchantia pealei
- Marmota
  - †Marmota flaviventria
- †Marquettia
  - †Marquettia metzeli – type locality for species
- Martes
  - †Martes kinseyi – or unidentified comparable form
- †Mcconichthys – type locality for genus
  - †Mcconichthys longipinnis – type locality for species
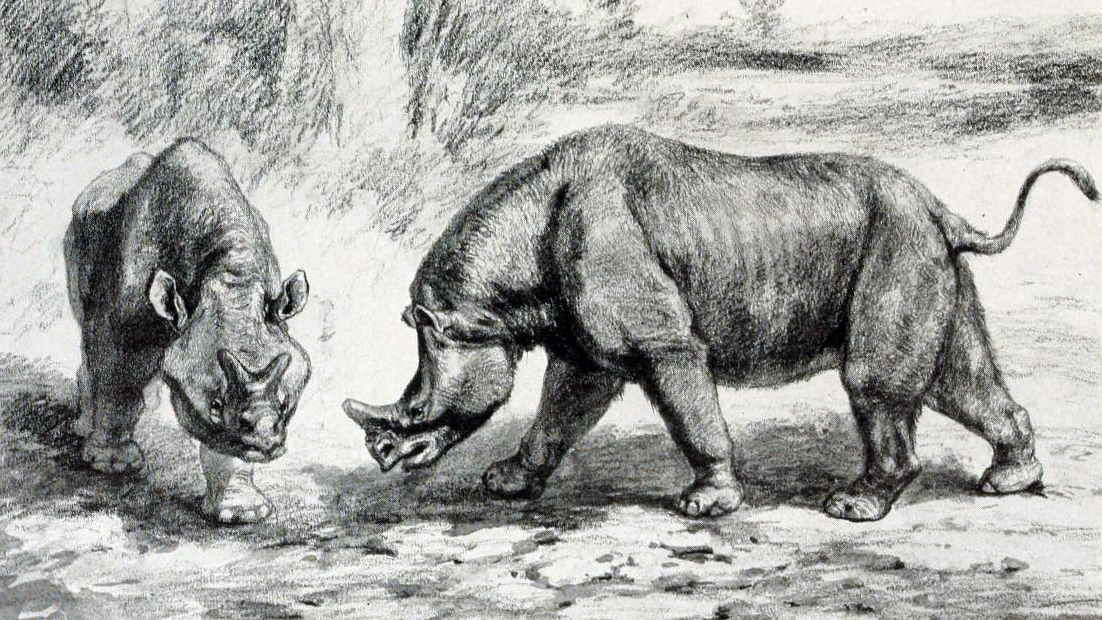
- Life restoration of battling males of the Eocene brontothere mammal Megacerops
  †Megacerops
  - †Megacerops kuwagatarhinus – type locality for species
- †Megahippus
- †Megalagus
  - †Megalagus brachyodon – type locality for species
  - †Megalagus dawsoni – type locality for species
  - †Megalagus turgidus – or unidentified comparable form
- †Megalonyx
  - †Megalonyx jeffersonii
- †Megantereon
- †Megatylopus
  - †Megatylopus gigas
- †Melastomites
  - †Melastomites montanensis
- †Meniscomys
- †Menodus
- †Merriamoceros
- †Merychippus
  - †Merychippus sejunctus
- †Merychyus
  - †Merychyus arenarum – or unidentified comparable form
  - †Merychyus smithi
- †Merycochoerus
  - †Merycochoerus chelydra
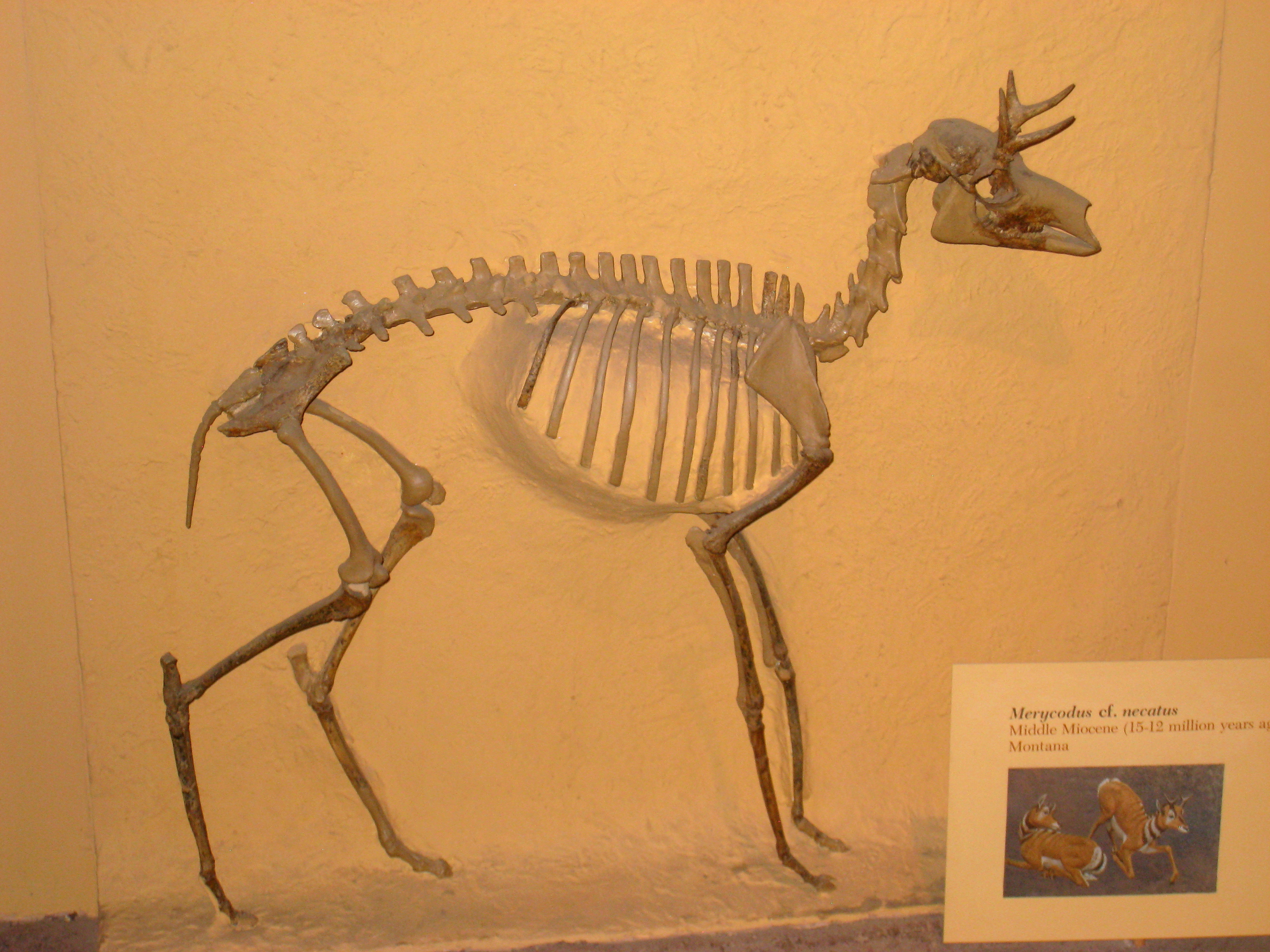
- Mounted fossilized skeleton of the Miocene pronghorn Merycodus
  †Merycodus
  - †Merycodus necatus – or unidentified comparable form
- †Merycoides
  - †Merycoides longiceps
- †Merycoidodon
  - †Merycoidodon culbertsoni – or unidentified comparable form
- †Mesodma
  - †Mesodma ambigua – or unidentified comparable form
  - †Mesodma formosa
  - †Mesodma garfieldensis – type locality for species
  - †Mesodma pygmaea – type locality for species
  - †Mesodma thompsoni
- †Mesogaulus
  - †Mesogaulus ballensis – type locality for species
  - †Mesogaulus douglassi
- †Mesohippus
  - †Mesohippus bairdi
  - †Mesohippus westoni – type locality for species
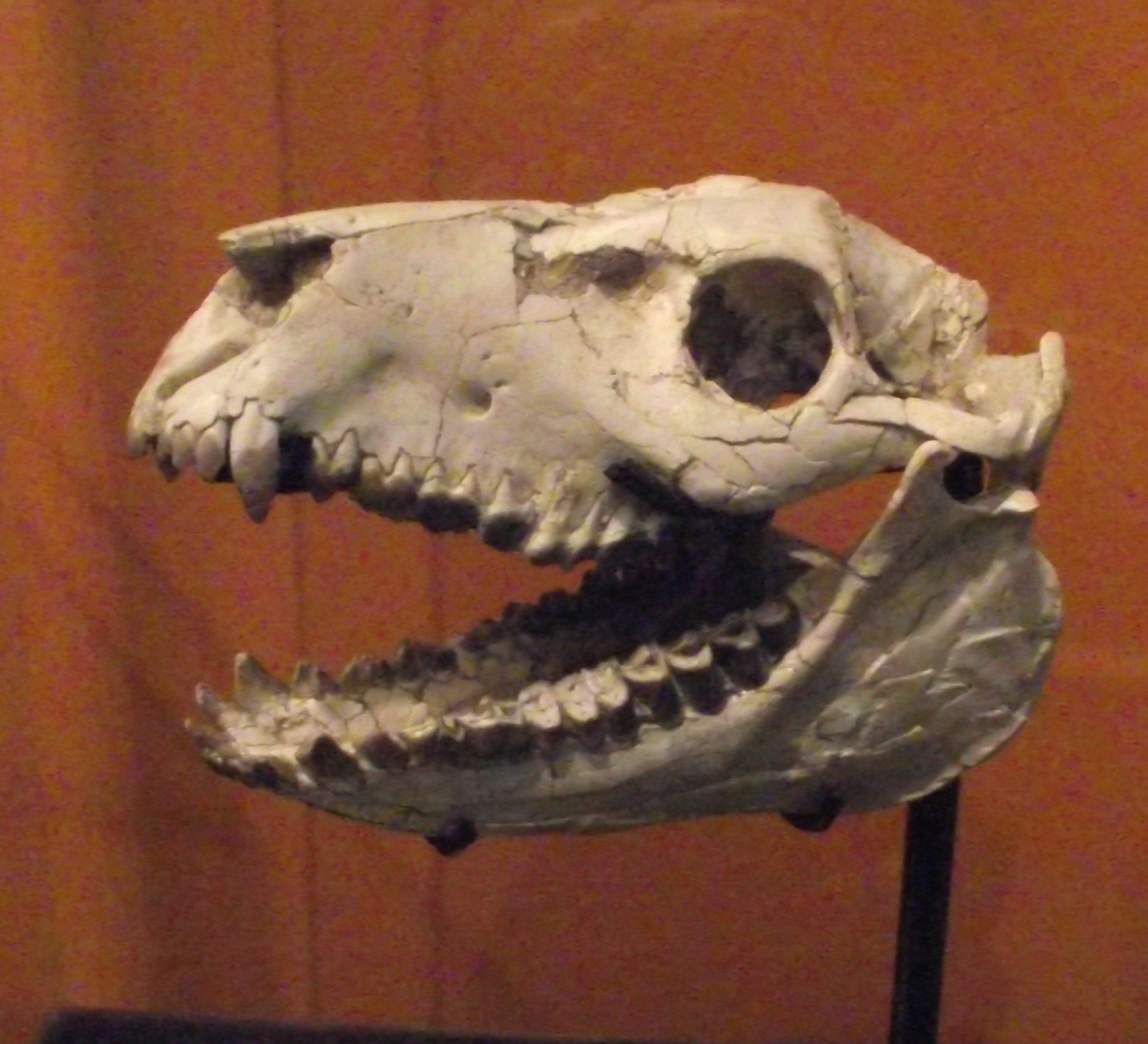
- Fossilized skull of the Miocene oreodont mammal Mesoreodon
  †Mesoreodon
  - †Mesoreodon chelonyx
  - †Mesoreodon minor – type locality for species
- †Mesoscalops
  - †Mesoscalops montanensis – type locality for species
- †Metadjidaumo
- Metasequoia
  - †Metasequoia occidentalis
- †Metopium
  - †Metopium metopioides
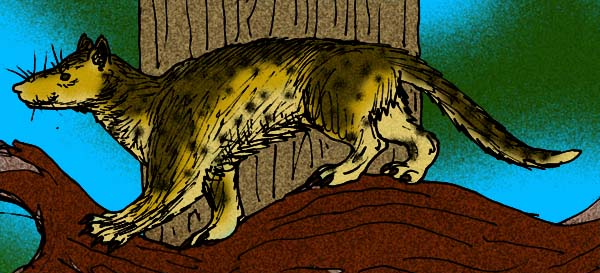
- Life restoration of the Paleocene-Eocene mammal Miacis
  †Miacis – report made of unidentified related form or using admittedly obsolete nomenclature
- †Microcosmodon
  - †Microcosmodon harleyi – type locality for species
- †Micropternodus
  - †Micropternodus borealis – type locality for species
- Microtus
  - †Microtus pennsylvanicus – or unidentified comparable form
- †Mimatuta
  - †Mimatuta minuial
  - †Mimatuta morgoth – type locality for species
- †Mimetodon
  - †Mimetodon silberlingi – type locality for species
- †Mimosites
  - †Mimosites acaciafolius
- †Mimotricentes
  - †Mimotricentes fremontensis
  - †Mimotricentes tedfordi – tentative report
- †Minerisporites
  - †Minerisporites glossoferus (Dijkstra) n. comb.
- †Miniochoerus – tentative report
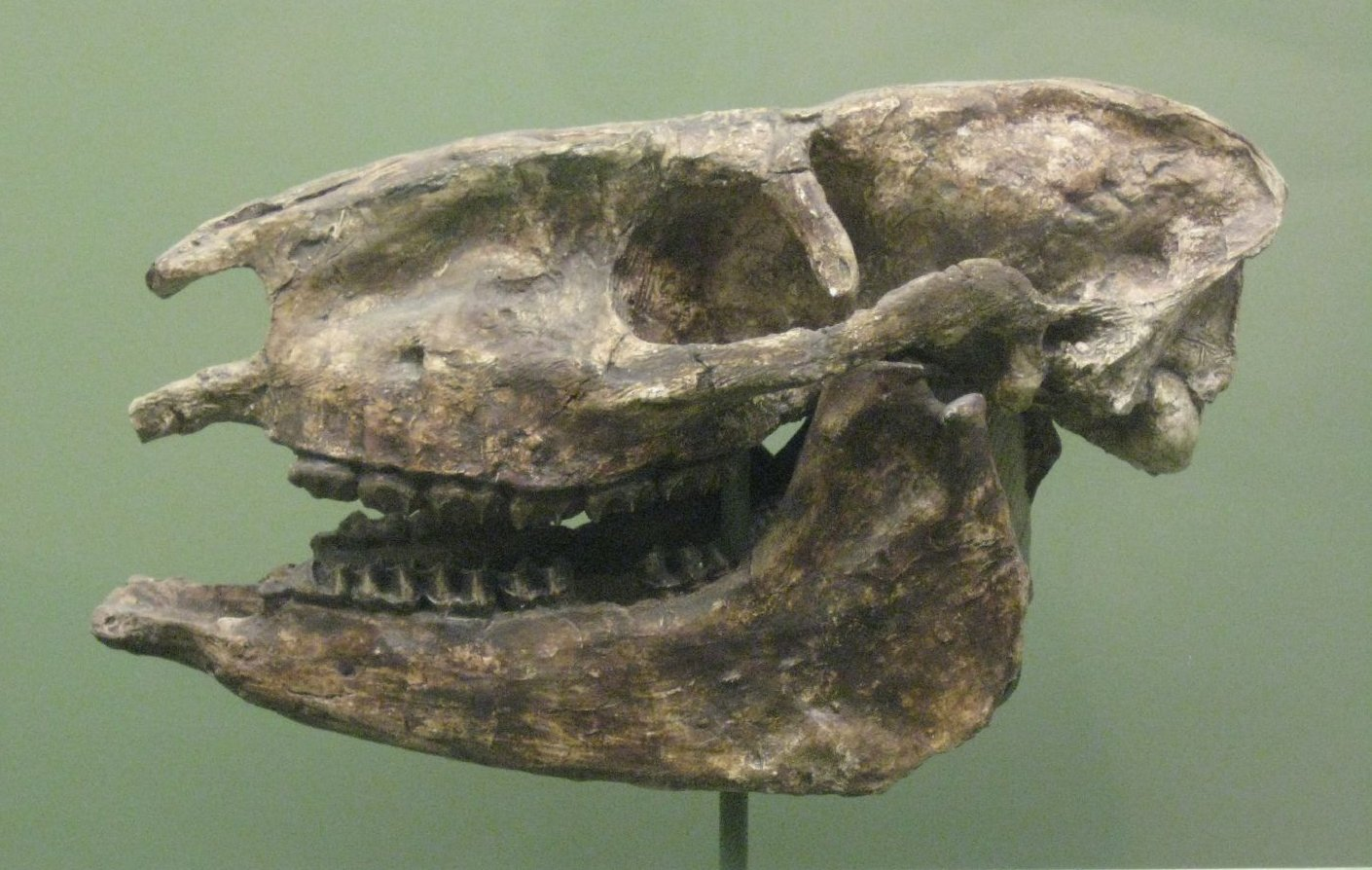
- Fossilized skull of the Eocene-Oligocene three-toed horse Miohippus
  †Miohippus – type locality for genus
  - †Miohippus anceps – tentative report
  - †Miohippus annectens – tentative report
  - †Miohippus equiceps – tentative report
  - †Miohippus gemmarosae – or unidentified comparable form
  - †Miohippus grandis
  - †Miohippus obliquidens
  - †Miohippus taxus – type locality for species
- †Mionictis – tentative report
- †Miopsyche – tentative report
  - †Miopsyche rubiensis – type locality for species
- †Mnium
  - †Mnium montanense
- †Mojavemys
- †Monosaulax
  - †Monosaulax pansus – tentative report
- †Montanatylopus
  - †Montanatylopus matthewi – type locality for species
- †Mookomys
  - †Mookomys formicarum – or unidentified comparable form
  - †Mookomys thrinax – type locality for species
- Morus
- †Muscites
  - †Muscites gracilens
- Mustela
  - †Mustela frenata
- †Mustelavus
  - †Mustelavus priscus
- Myrica
  - †Myrica lignitum
  - †Myrica mormonensis
  - †Myrica serrulata
- †Myrmecoboides
  - †Myrmecoboides montanensis – type locality for species
- †Myrtophyllum
  - †Myrtophyllum torreyi
- †Mystipterus
- †Mytonolagus
  - †Mytonolagus petersoni – or unidentified comparable form

== N ==
- †Namatomys
  - †Namatomys lloydi – type locality for species
- †Nannodectes
  - †Nannodectes gidleyi – or unidentified comparable form
  - †Nannodectes intermedius
  - †Nannodectes simpsoni – or unidentified comparable form
- †Nanodelphys
  - †Nanodelphys hunti
- †Nanotragulus
- †Navajovius
- †Nelumbago
  - †Nelumbago montanum
- †Nelumbo
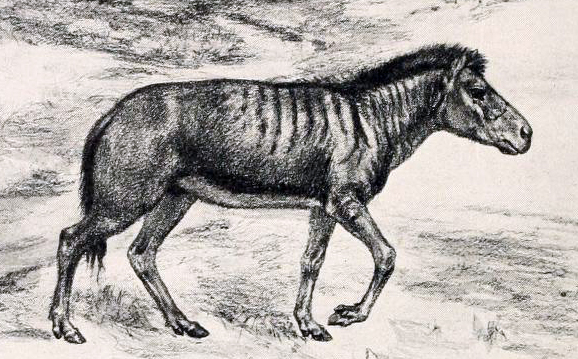
- Life restoration of a herd of Neohipparion. Robert Bruce Horsfall (1913).
  †Neohipparion
- †Neoplagiaulax
  - †Neoplagiaulax donaldorum – type locality for species
  - †Neoplagiaulax grangeri – type locality for species
  - †Neoplagiaulax hunteri – type locality for species
  - †Neoplagiaulax kremnus
  - †Neoplagiaulax mckennai
  - †Neoplagiaulax nelsoni – type locality for species
- †Niglarodon
  - †Niglarodon blacki – type locality for species
  - †Niglarodon koerneri – type locality for species
  - †Niglarodon loneyi – type locality for species
  - †Niglarodon progressus
- †Nordenskioldia
  - †Nordenskioldia borealis
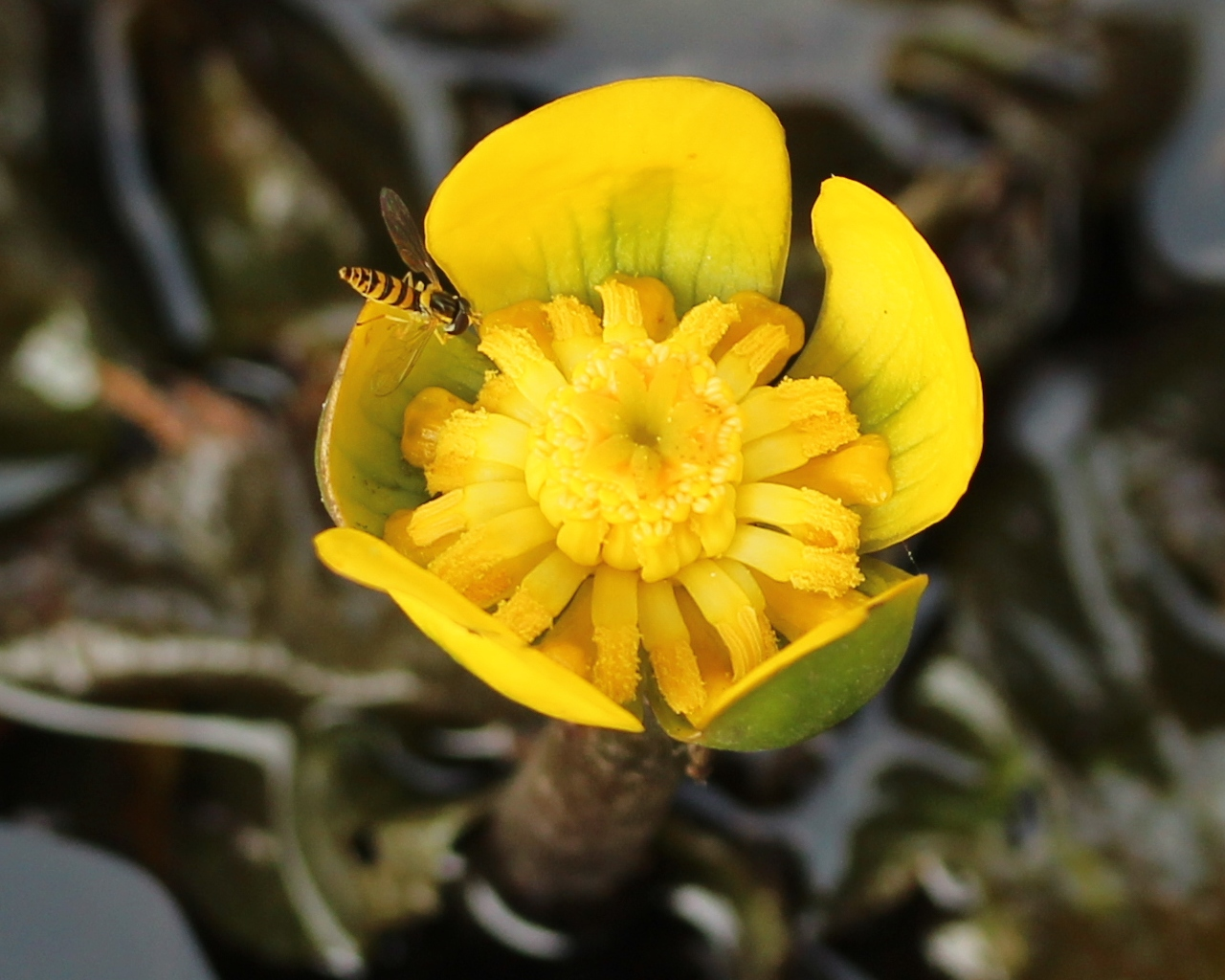
- A living Nuphar water lily
  †Nuphar
  - †Nuphar advenoides
- †Nyctitherium
- †Nymphaeites
  - †Nymphaeites nevadensis
- †Nyssa
  - †Nyssa alata
  - †Nyssa borealis
  - †Nyssa crenata

== O ==
- †Ocajila
  - †Ocajila makpiyahe – or unidentified comparable form
- †Odaxosaurus
  - †Odaxosaurus piger
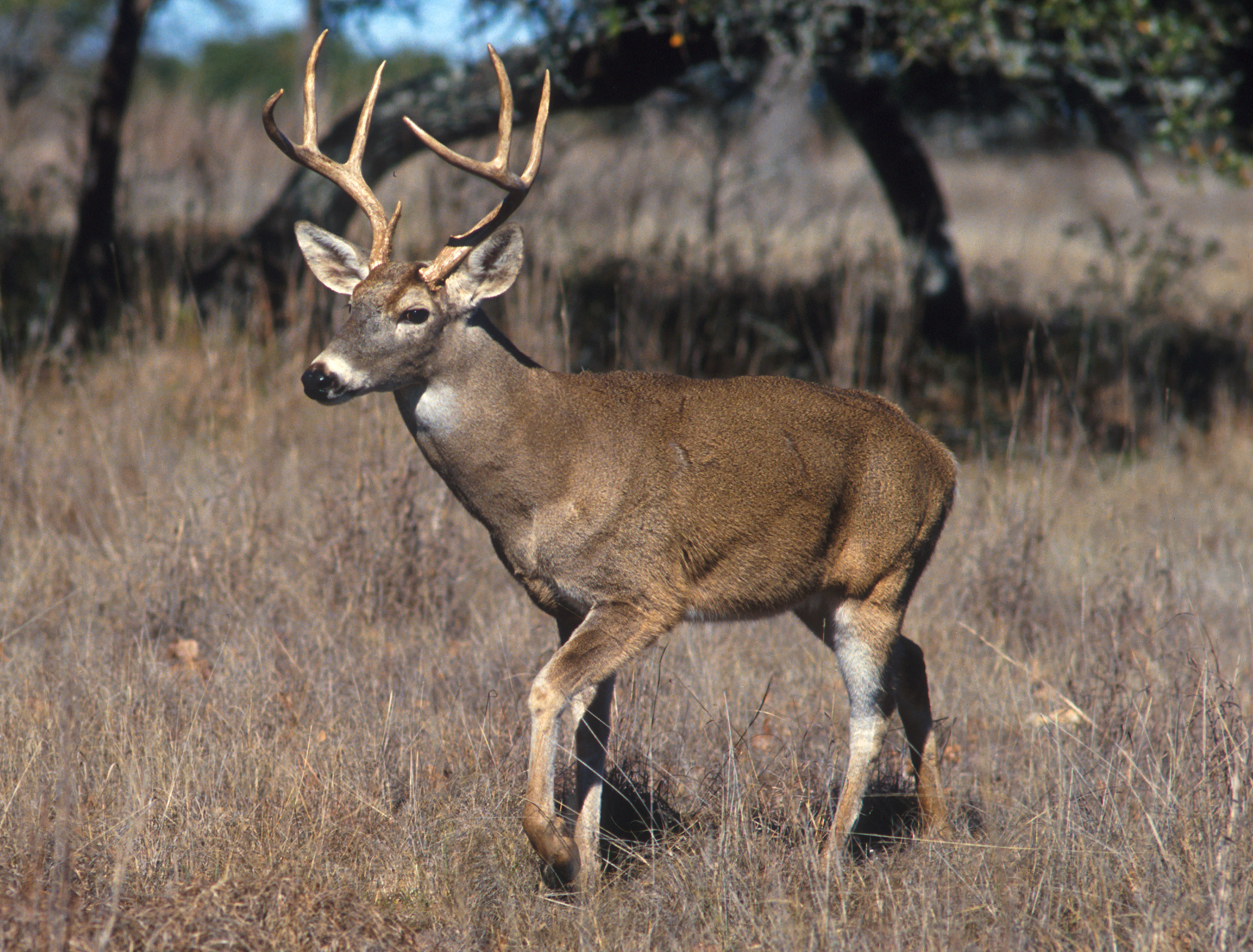
- A living Odocoileus deer
  Odocoileus – or unidentified comparable form
- †Ogmophis
  - †Ogmophis arenarum – type locality for species
- Olar
  - †Olar buccinator
- †Oligodontosaurus
  - †Oligodontosaurus wyomingensis – or unidentified comparable form
- †Oligoryctes
  - †Oligoryctes altitalonidus
  - †Oligoryctes cameronensis
- †Oligoscalops
- †Oligotheriomys
  - †Oligotheriomys senrudi
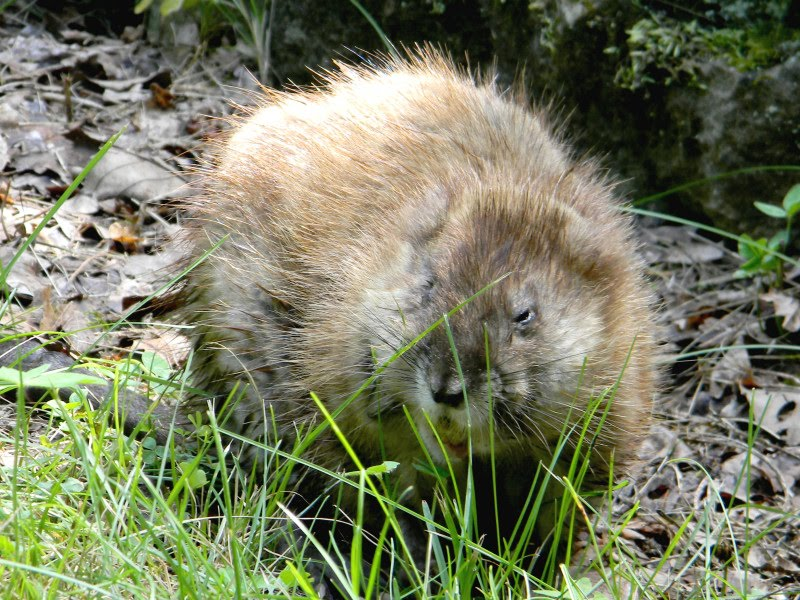
- A living Ondatra, or muskrat
  Ondatra
  - †Ondatra xibethicus
  - †Ondatra zibethicus
- †Onoclea
  - †Onoclea hesperia
- †Onychodectes
  - †Onychodectes tisonensis
- †Opisthotriton
  - †Opisthotriton gidleyi – type locality for species
  - †Opisthotriton kayi
- Oreohelix
- †Oreolagus
  - †Oreolagus nevadensis
- †Oreonetes
  - †Oreonetes anceps
  - †Oreonetes douglassi
- †Osmanthus
  - †Osmanthus praemissa
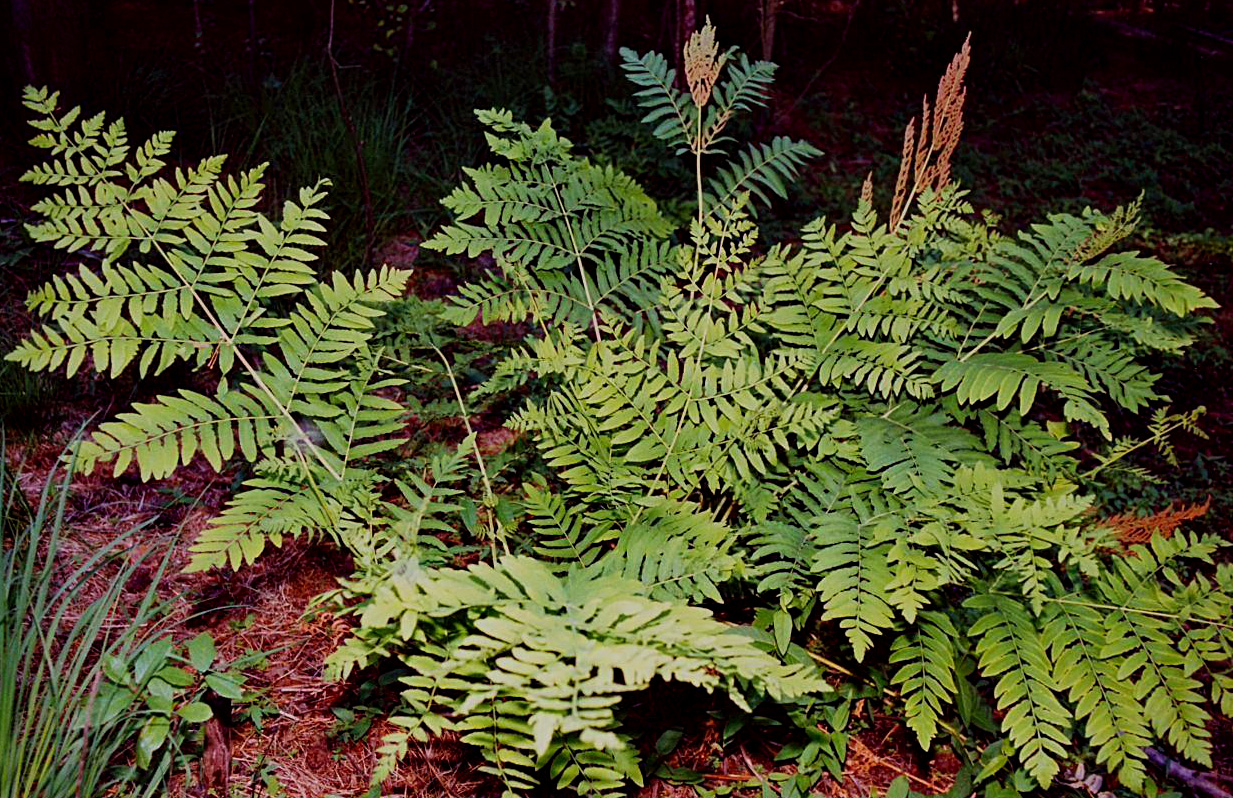
- Living Osmunda ferns
  †Osmunda
  - †Osmunda greenlandica
  - †Osmunda macrophylla
  - †Osmunda occidentalis
- Ostrya
  - †Ostrya oregoniana
- †Otarocyon
  - †Otarocyon macdonaldi
- †Oxyacodon
  - †Oxyacodon apiculatus
  - †Oxyacodon ferronensis
  - †Oxyacodon marshater
- †Oxyclaenus
  - †Oxyclaenus pugnax
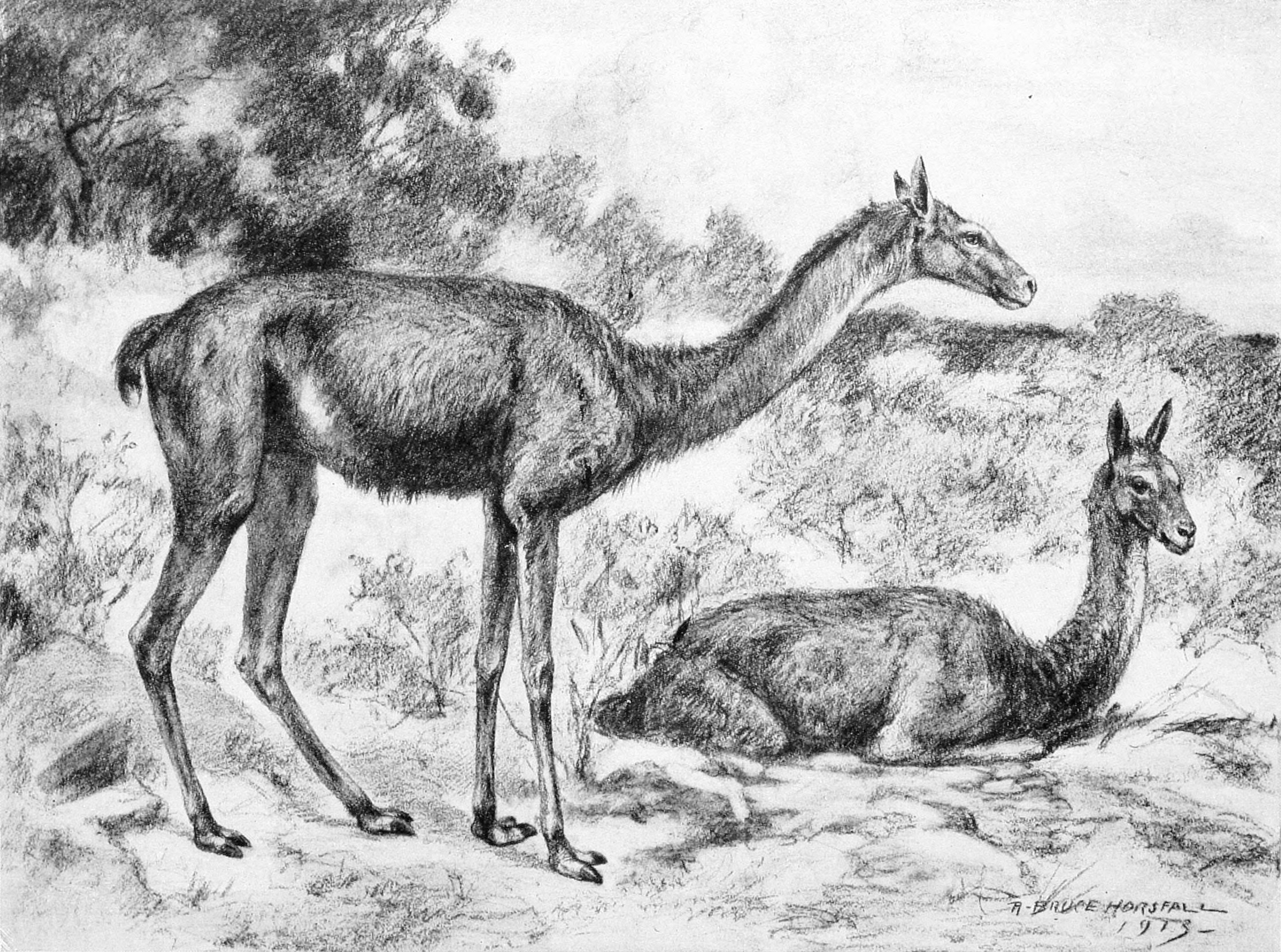
- Life restoration of a pair of the Oligocene-Miocene camel Oxydactylus. Robert Bruce Horsfall (1913).
  †Oxydactylus
  - †Oxydactylus lacota – or unidentified comparable form
- †Oxyprimus
  - †Oxyprimus erikseni – type locality for species

== P ==
- †Paciculus
- †Pagonomus – or unidentified comparable form
- †Palaechthon – type locality for genus
  - †Palaechthon alticuspis – type locality for species
  - †Palaechthon woodi – or unidentified comparable form
- †Palaeictops
- †Palaeocarpinus
  - †Palaeocarpinus joffrenses
- †Palaeogale
  - †Palaeogale sectoria
- †Palaeohypnum
  - †Palaeohypnum beckeri
- †Palaeolabrus
  - †Palaeolabrus montanensis – or unidentified comparable form
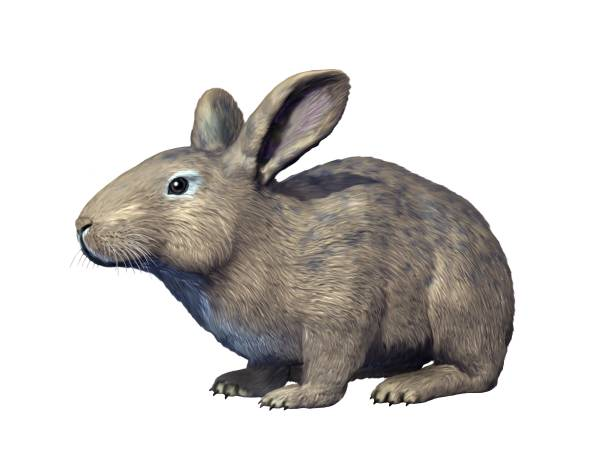
- Restoration of the Oligocene rabbit relative Palaeolagus
  †Palaeolagus
  - †Palaeolagus burkei
  - †Palaeolagus haydeni
  - †Palaeolagus hypsodus
  - †Palaeolagus intermedius
  - †Palaeolagus temnodon – type locality for species
- †Palaeophytocrene
- †Palaeoryctes
- †Palaeosinopa
  - †Palaeosinopa didelphoides – or unidentified comparable form
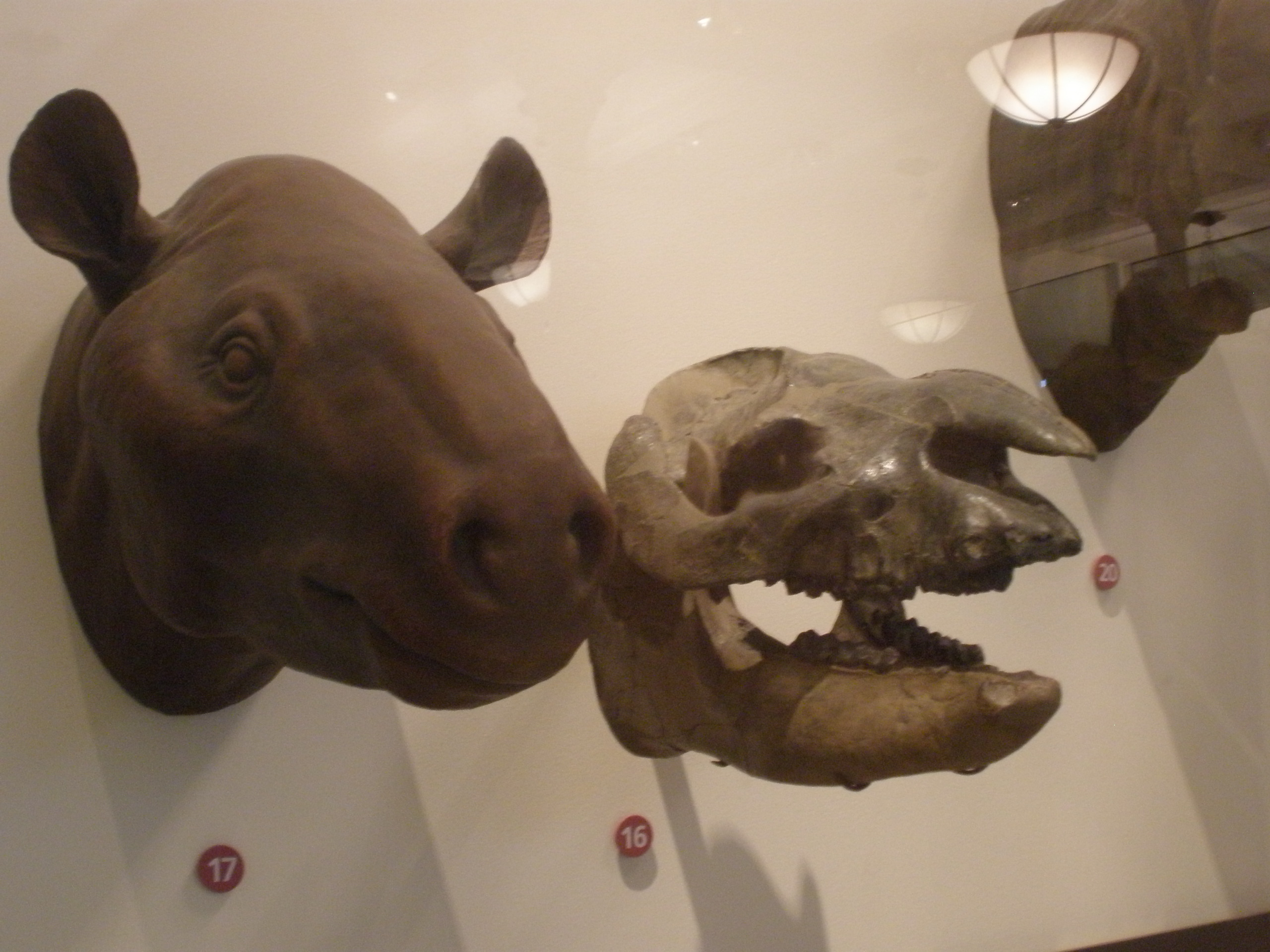
- Restorative model and fossilized skull of the Eocene brontothere mammal Palaeosyops
  †Palaeosyops
  - †Palaeosyops fontinalis
- †Palaeoxantusia
  - †Palaeoxantusia fera
- †Palatobaena
  - †Palatobaena bairdi
- †Palenochtha – type locality for genus
  - †Palenochtha minor – type locality for species
- †Paleonelumbo
  - †Paleonelumbo macroloba
- †Paleonuphar
  - †Paleonuphar hesperium
- †Paleopsephurus – or unidentified comparable form
- †Paleotomus
  - †Paleotomus senior – type locality for species
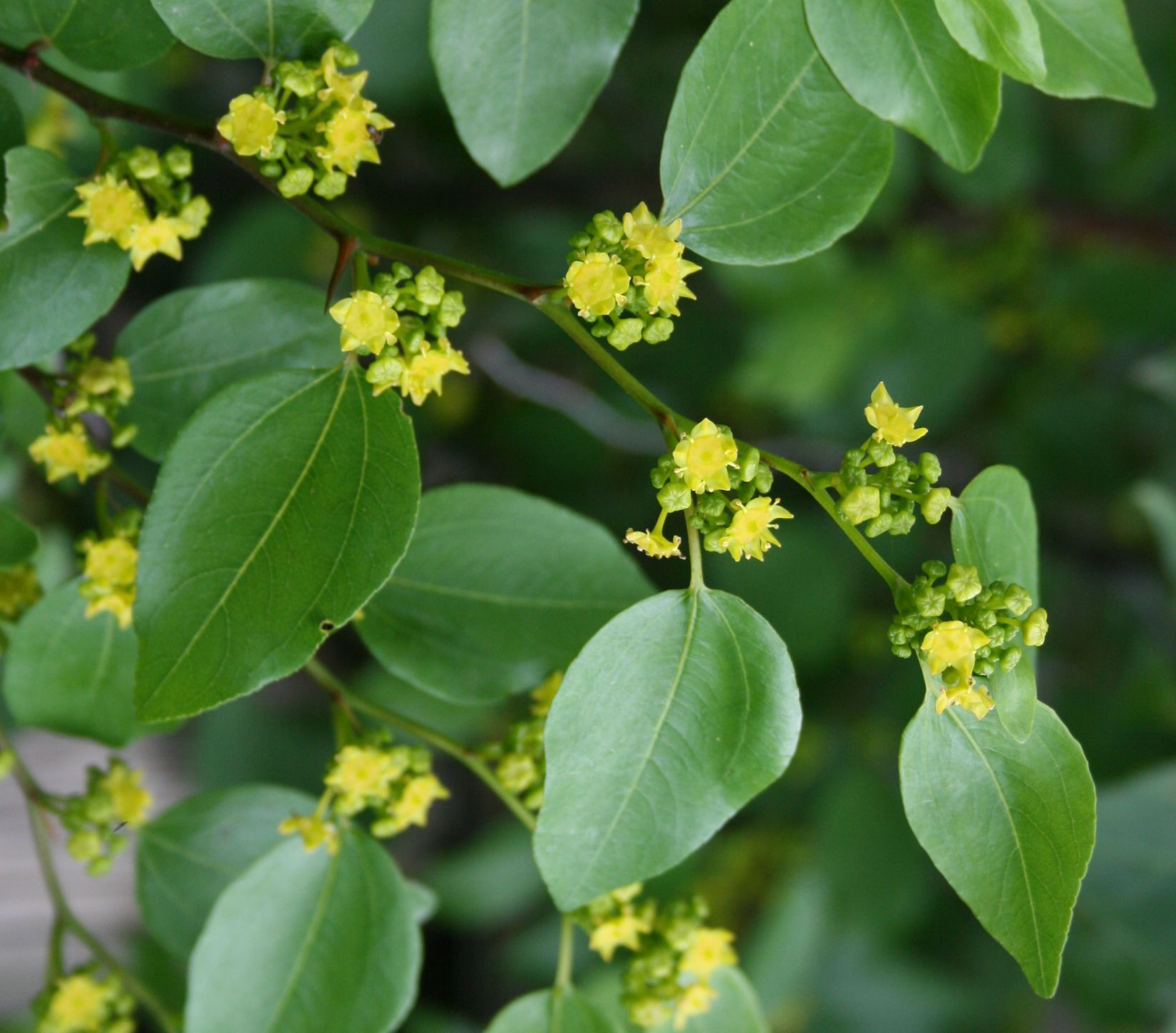
- Flowers and foliage of a living Paliurus
  Paliurus
  - †Paliurus dumosus
  - †Paliurus florissanti
- †Pandemonium
  - †Pandemonium dis – type locality for species
- †Pantolambda
  - †Pantolambda intermedius – type locality for species
- †Pantomimus – type locality for genus
  - †Pantomimus leari – type locality for species
- †Paracosoryx
- †Paradjidaumo
  - †Paradjidaumo spokanensis – type locality for species
  - †Paradjidaumo trilophus
- †Paramerychyus
  - †Paramerychyus harrisonensis
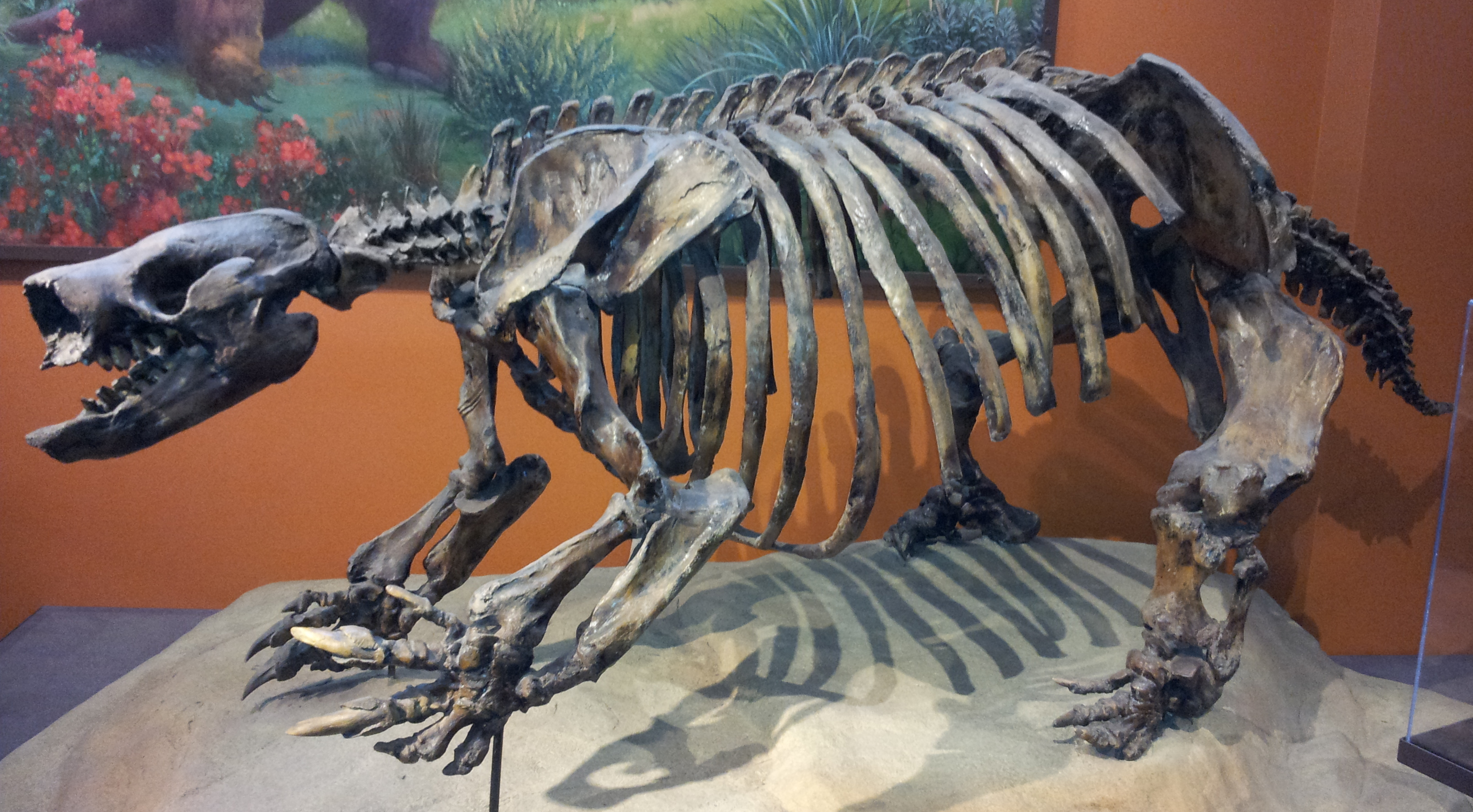
- Fossilized skeleton of the Pliocene-Pleistocene ground sloth Paramylodon
  †Paramylodon
  - †Paramylodon harlani
- †Paramys
  - †Paramys relictus
- †Paranymphaea
  - †Paranymphaea crassifolia
- †Parapliosaccomys
  - †Parapliosaccomys annae – or unidentified comparable form
- †Pararyctes
  - †Pararyctes pattersoni
- †Paratomarctus
  - †Paratomarctus temerarius
- †Parectypodus
  - †Parectypodus sinclairi – type locality for species
  - †Parectypodus sylviae
- †Pareumys – tentative report
- †Parictis
  - †Parictis montanus
- †Paromomys
  - †Paromomys depressidens – type locality for species
  - †Paromomys maturus – type locality for species
- †Parthenocissus
  - †Parthenocissus ursina
- †Parvericius
  - †Parvericius montanus
- †Paulownia
  - †Paulownia columbiana
  - †Paulownia thomsoni
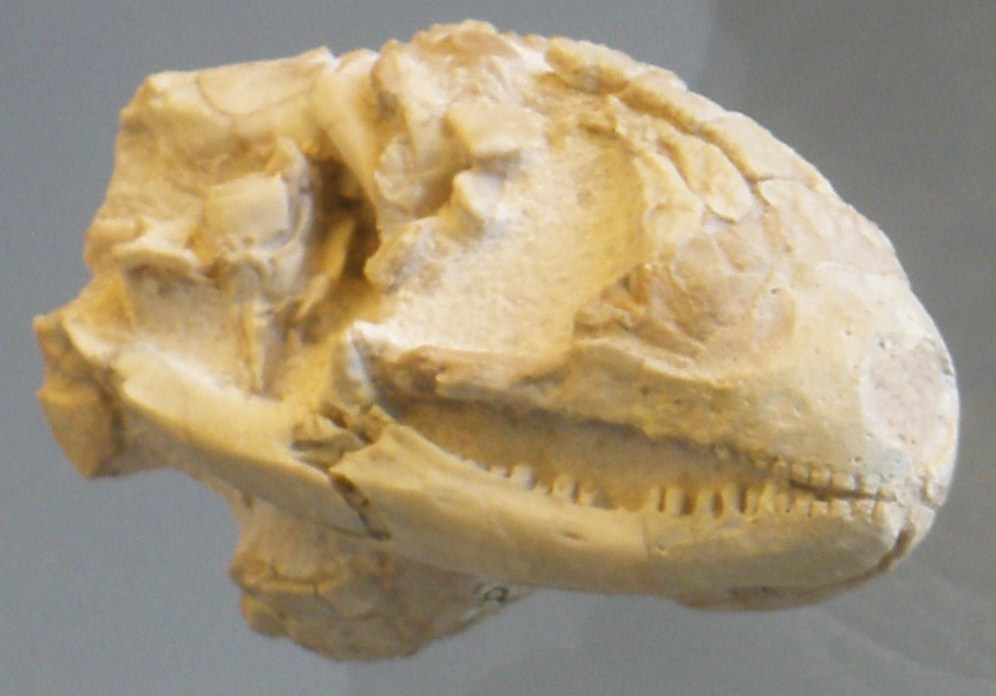
- Fossilized skull of the Eocene-Oligocene lizard Peltosaurus
  †Peltosaurus
- †Pelycomys
- †Penetrigonias
  - †Penetrigonias dakotensis
- †Penosphyllum
  - †Penosphyllum cordatum
- Penthetria
  - †Penthetria abacula – type locality for species
  - †Penthetria alderensis – type locality for species
  - †Penthetria rubiensis – type locality for species
- †Peraceras
  - †Peraceras profectum
  - †Peraceras superciliosum
- †Peradectes
  - †Peradectes elegans – or unidentified comparable form
  - †Peradectes minor – type locality for species
  - †Peradectes protinnominatus – or unidentified comparable form
- †Peridiomys
  - †Peridiomys halis – type locality for species
- †Periptychus
- †Perognathoides
  - †Perognathoides eurekensis – or unidentified comparable form
- Perognathus
  - †Perognathus ancenensis – type locality for species
- Peromyscus
  - †Peromyscus maniculatus – or unidentified comparable form
- Persea
  - †Persea brossiana
- †Petauristodon
- †Phasmatopelecinus – type locality for genus
  - †Phasmatopelecinus leonae – type locality for species
- †Phenacodaptes – or unidentified comparable form
  - †Phenacodaptes sabulosus
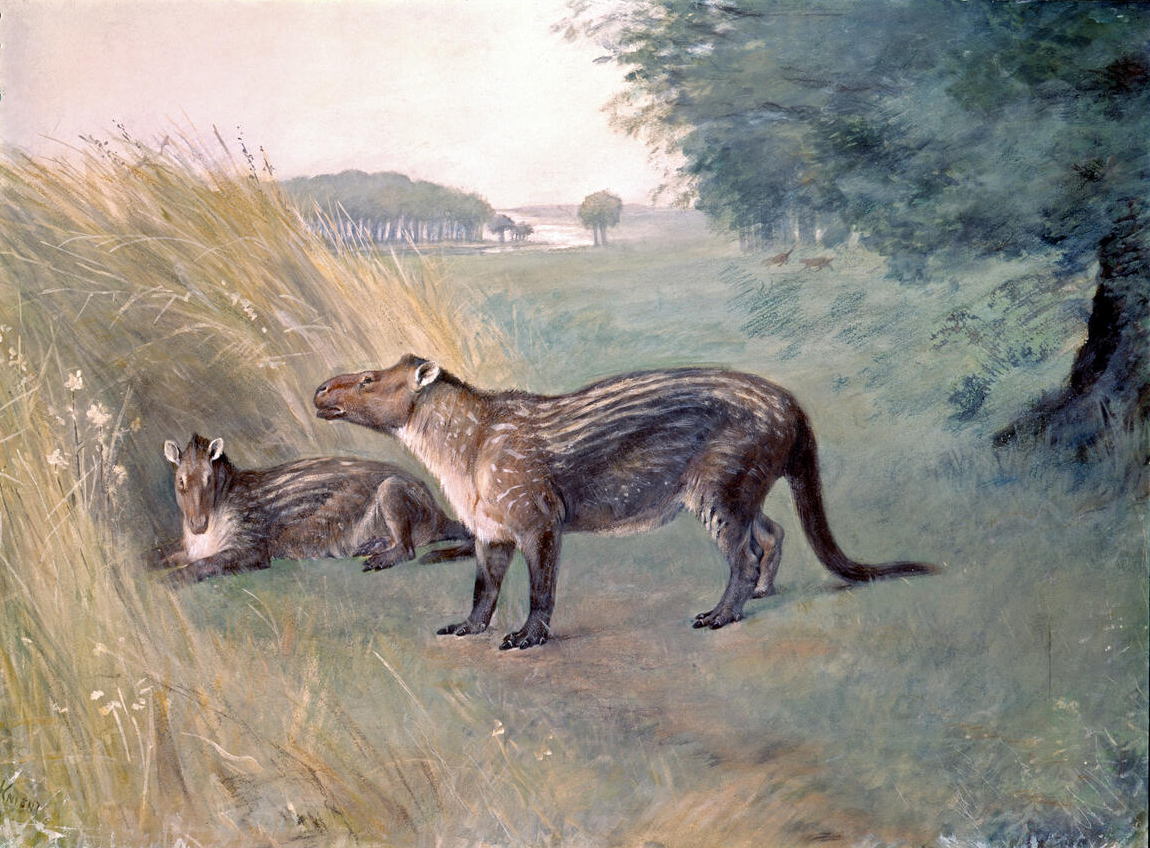
- Life restoration of the Paleocene-Eocene ungulate Phenacodus. Charles R. Knight (1898).
  †Phenacodus
  - †Phenacodus bisonensis
  - †Phenacodus intermedius
  - †Phenacodus magnus
- Phragmites
  - †Phragmites alaskana
- †Phthiria
  - †Phthiria fossa – type locality for species
- †Phyllites
  - †Phyllites demoresi
  - †Phyllites disturbans
- Picea
  - †Picea lahontensis
  - †Picea magna
  - †Picea sonomensis
- †Piceoerpeton
  - †Piceoerpeton willwoodense
- †Picrodus
  - †Picrodus canpacius
  - †Picrodus silberlingi – type locality for species
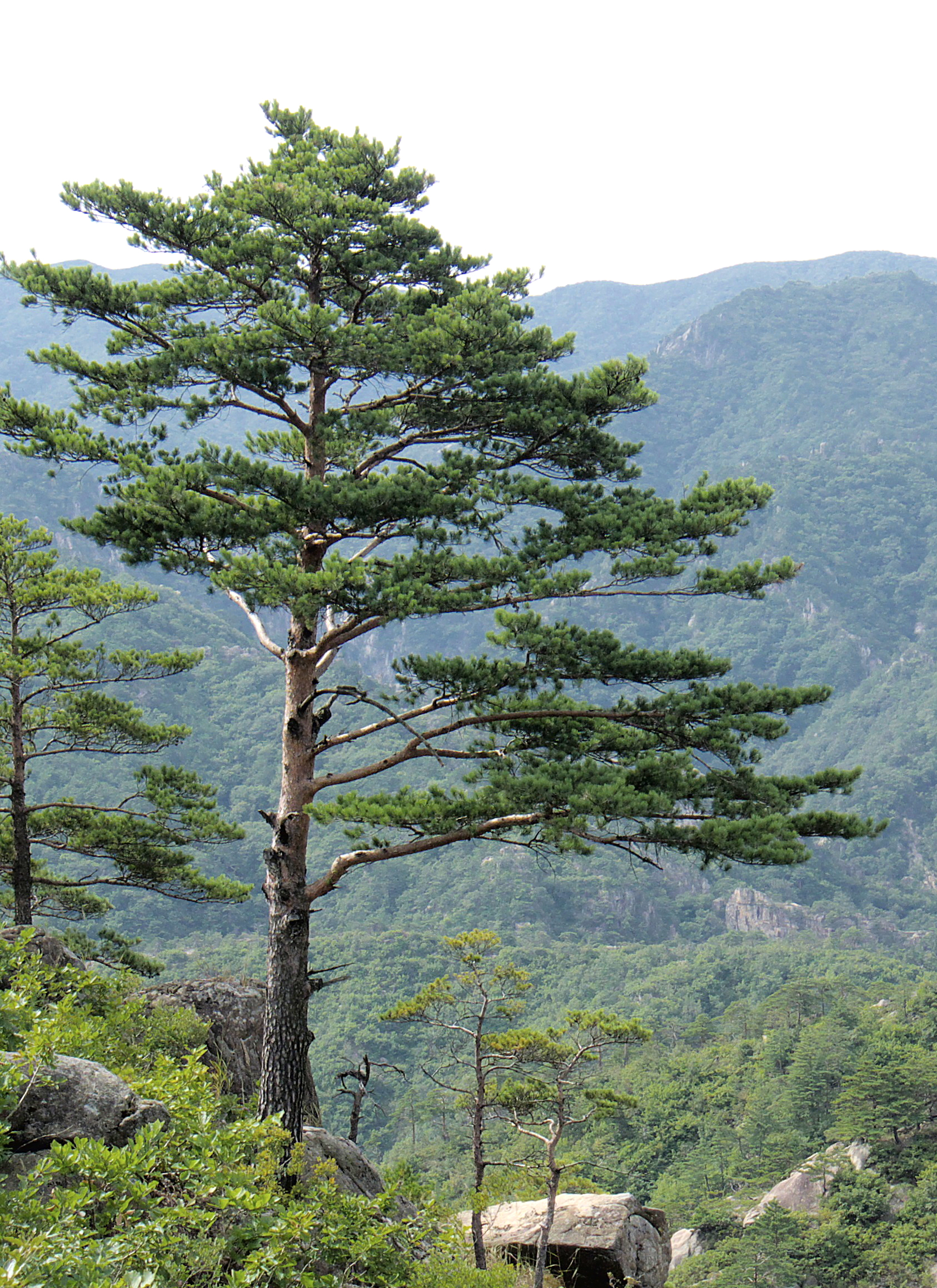
- A living Pinus, or pine tree
  Pinus
  - †Pinus florissanti
  - †Pinus wheeleri
- †Pipestoneia – type locality for genus
  - †Pipestoneia douglassi – type locality for species
- †Pipestoneomys
  - †Pipestoneomys bisulcatus
- †Pithecolobium
  - †Pithecolobium eocenicum
- †Planatus
  - †Planatus nobilis
  - †Planatus raynoldsi
- †Planetetherium
  - †Planetetherium mirabile – type locality for species
- †Plastomenoides – type locality for genus
  - †Plastomenoides lamberti – type locality for species
  - †Plastomenoides tetanetron – type locality for species
- †Plastomenus – or unidentified comparable form
- Platanus
  - †Platanus dissecta
  - †Platanus nobilis
  - †Platanus raynoldsi
  - †Platanus raynoldsii
  - †Platanus stenoloba
- Plecia
  - †Plecia inflata – type locality for species
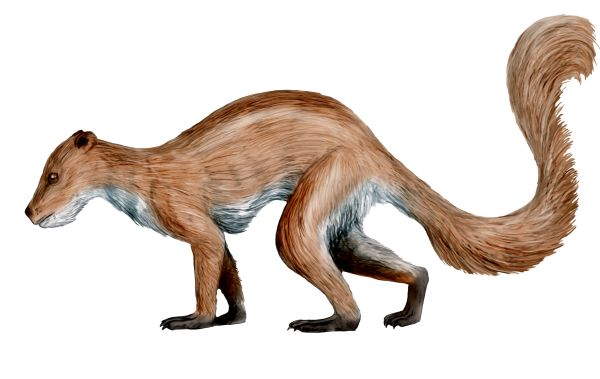
- Life restoration of the Paleocene-Eocene primate Plesiadapis
  †Plesiadapis
  - †Plesiadapis anceps – type locality for species
  - †Plesiadapis churchilli – type locality for species
  - †Plesiadapis praecursor – type locality for species
  - †Plesiadapis rex – type locality for species
- †Plesiolestes
  - †Plesiolestes problematicus
- †Pleurolicus
- †Plioceros
  - †Plioceros blicki – or unidentified comparable form
- †Pliohippus
- †Plionictis
  - †Plionictis ogygia
- †Plithocyon
  - †Plithocyon ursinus
- †Poacites
- †Poebrotherium
  - †Poebrotherium eximium – or unidentified comparable form
  - †Poebrotherium wilsoni
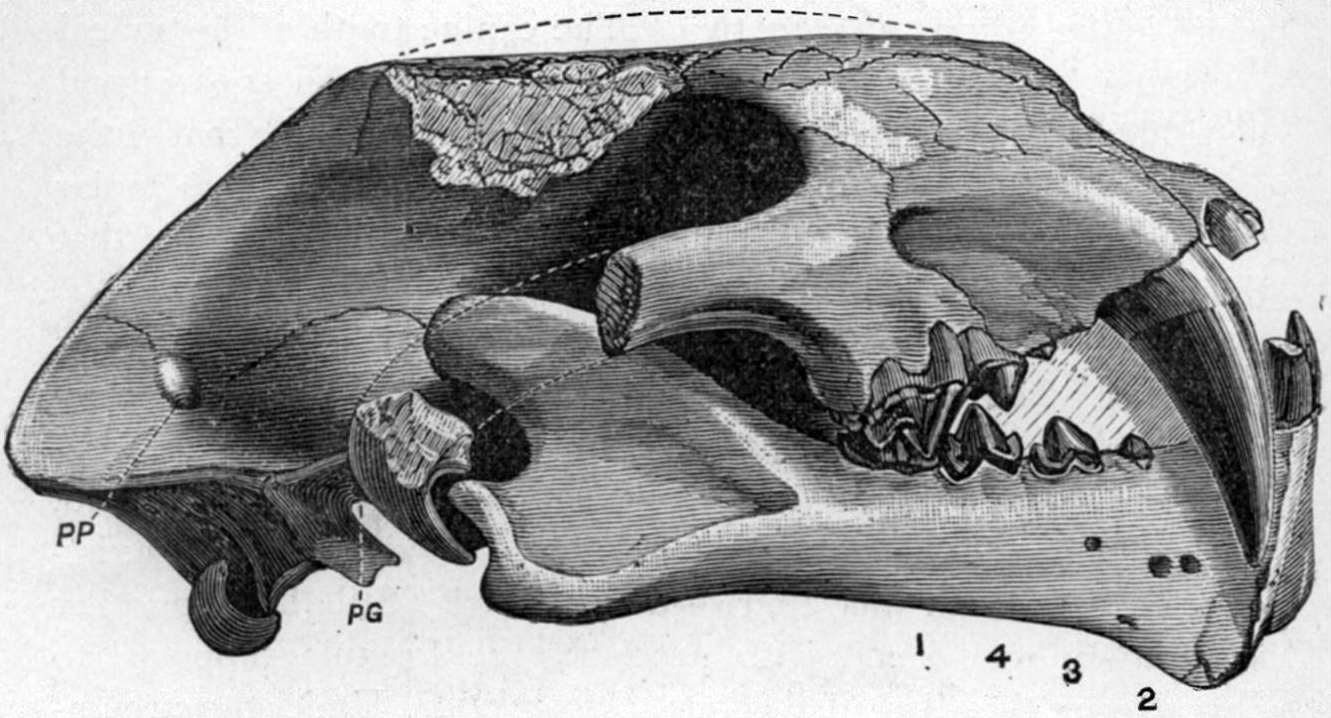
- Illustration of a fossilized skull of the Oligocene false faber-toothed cat Pogonodon
  †Pogonodon
- †Ponerites
  - †Ponerites kishenehne – type locality for species
- Populus
  - †Populus adamantea
  - †Populus balsamoides
  - †Populus cedrusensis
  - †Populus cinnamomoides
  - †Populus eotremuloides
  - †Populus lindgreni
  - †Populus nebrascensis
  - †Populus payettensis
  - †Populus washoensis
- †Potamanthellus
  - †Potamanthellus rubiensis – type locality for species
- †Potentilla
  - †Potentilla horkelioides
  - †Potentilla salmonensis
- †Pradjidaumo
  - †Pradjidaumo trilophus
- †Preissites
  - †Preissites wardi
  - †Preissites wardii
- †Procerberus
  - †Procerberus formicarum – type locality for species
  - †Procerberus grandis – or unidentified comparable form
  - †Procerberus plutonis
- †Prochetodon
  - †Prochetodon foxi – type locality for species
- †Prodesmodon
  - †Prodesmodon copei
- †Prodiacodon
  - †Prodiacodon concordiarcensis – type locality for species
  - †Prodiacodon crustulum – type locality for species
  - †Prodiacodon furor – type locality for species
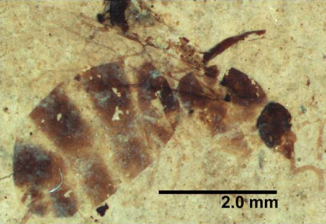
- Fossil of the Eocene ant Proiridomyrmex
  †Proiridomyrmex
  - †Proiridomyrmex rotundatus – type locality for species
- †Prokalotermes
  - †Prokalotermes alderensis – type locality for species
- †Promerycochoerus
  - †Promerycochoerus superbus
- †Promioclaenus
  - †Promioclaenus acolytus
- †Pronodens
  - †Pronodens silberlingi – type locality for species
- †Pronothodectes
  - †Pronothodectes matthewi – type locality for species
- †Propalaeosinopa
  - †Propalaeosinopa albertensis
- †Proscalops
  - †Proscalops intermedius – type locality for species
- †Prosciurus
  - †Prosciurus parvus – or unidentified comparable form
  - †Prosciurus vetustus – type locality for species
- †Prosphyracephala
  - †Prosphyracephala rubiensis – type locality for species
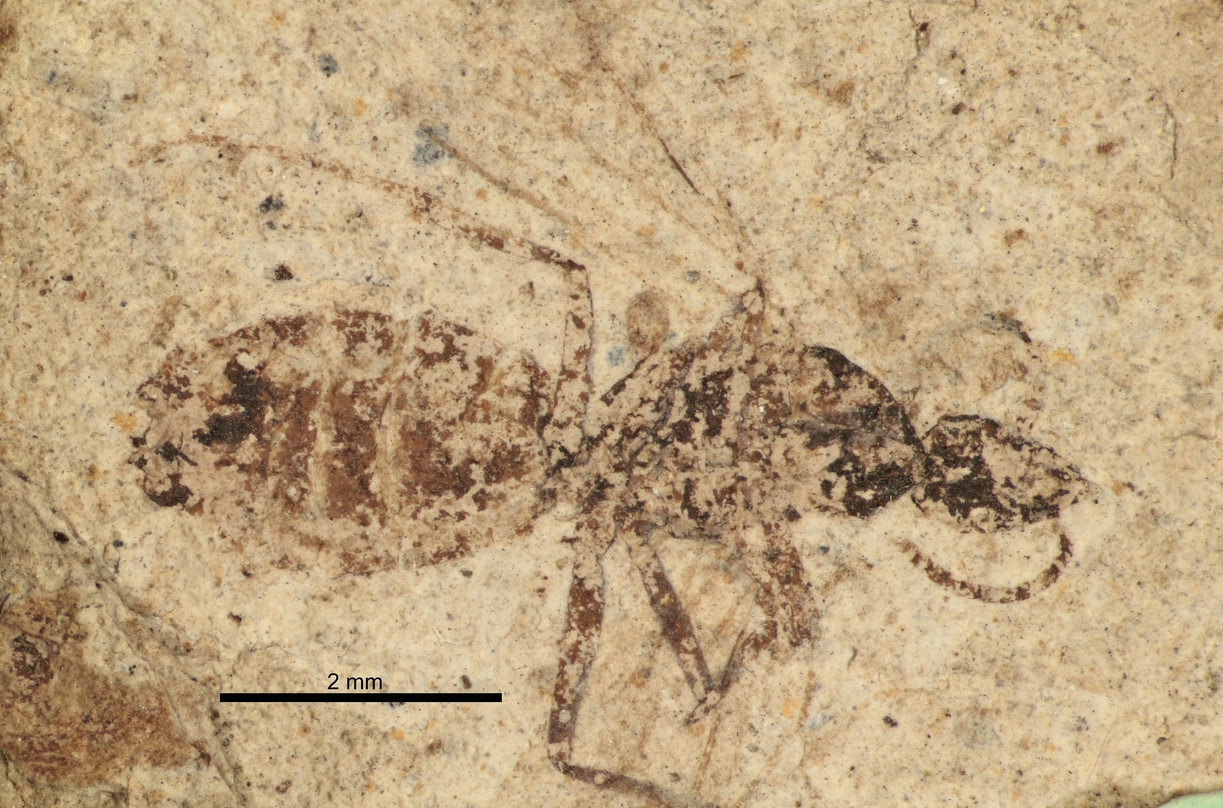
- Fossil of the Oligocene ant Protazteca
  †Protazteca
  - †Protazteca eocenica – type locality for species
- †Protentomodon
  - †Protentomodon ursirivalis – type locality for species
- †Prothryptacodon
  - †Prothryptacodon furens – type locality for species
- †Protictis
  - †Protictis haydenianus
  - †Protictis microlestes
- †Protochriacus
  - †Protochriacus simplex
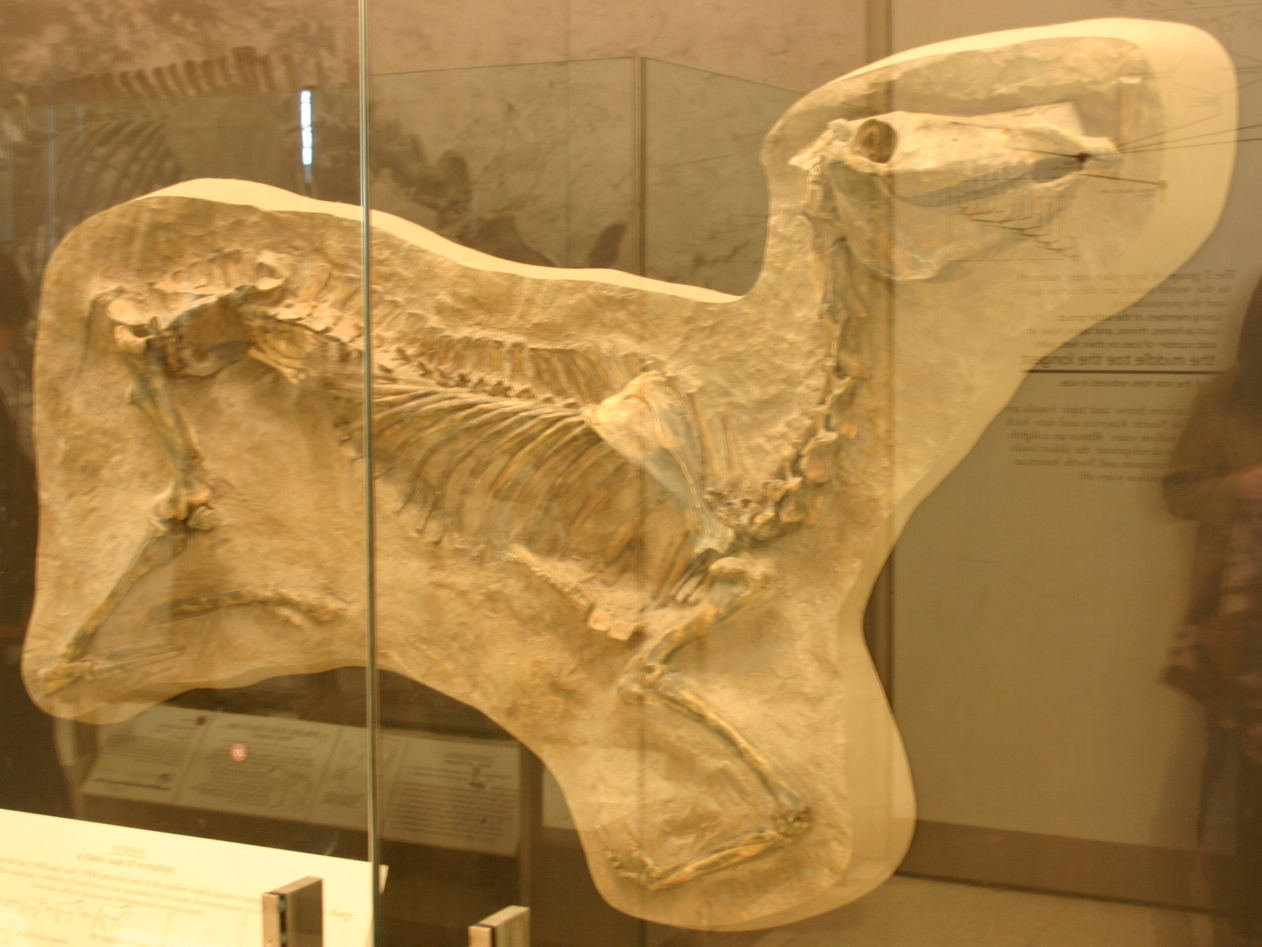
- Fossilized skeleton of the Miocene horse Protohippus
  †Protohippus
- †Protolabis
  - †Protolabis gracilis – or unidentified comparable form
- †Protoreodon
  - †Protoreodon pearcei
  - †Protoreodon pumilus
- †Protungulatum
  - †Protungulatum donnae
  - †Protungulatum gorgun – type locality for species
  - †Protungulatum sloani – type locality for species
- †Provaranosaurus – or unidentified comparable form
- †Proxestops
  - †Proxestops silberlingi
  - †Proxestops silberlingii – type locality for species
- Prunus
  - †Prunus careyhurstia
  - †Prunus corrugis
  - †Prunus lyoniifolia – type locality for species
  - †Prunus morangensis
  - †Prunus perita
  - †Prunus scottii
  - †Prunus wilcoxiana
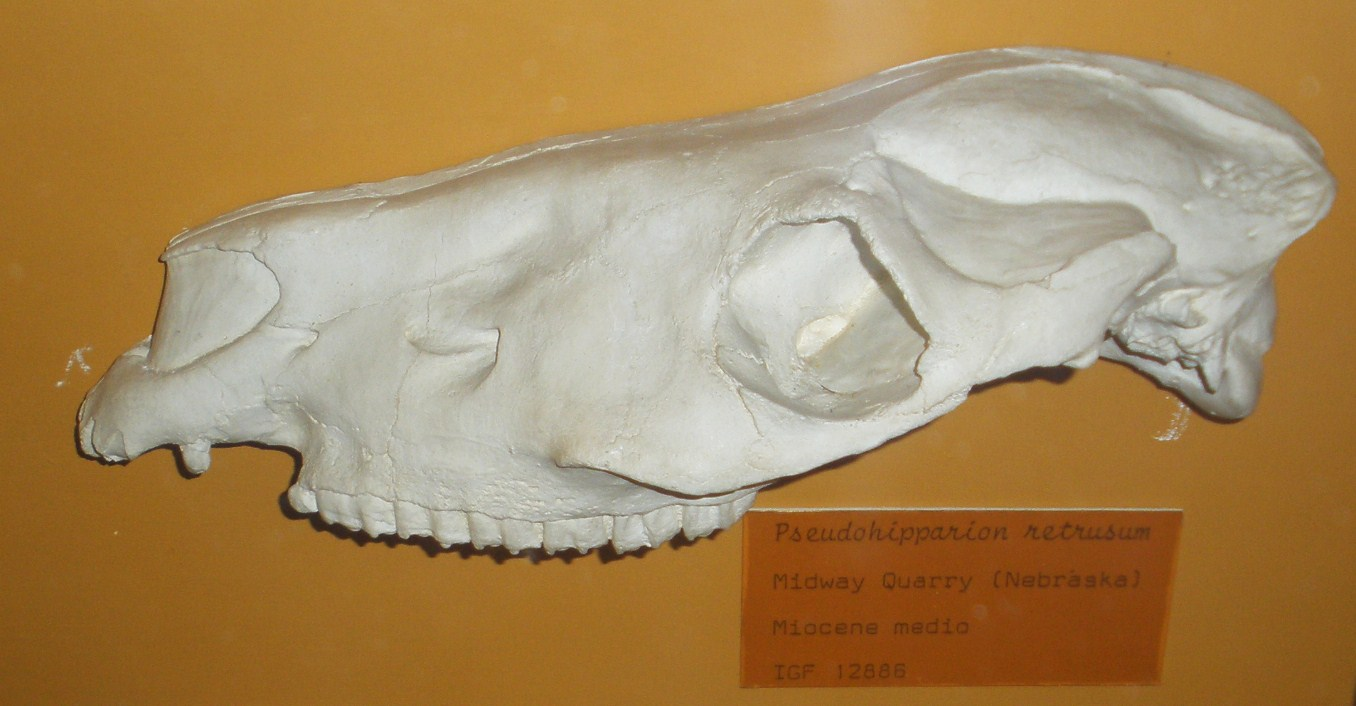
- Replica of a fossilized cranium of the Miocene horse Pseudhipparion
  †Pseudhipparion
- †Pseudocylindrodon
  - †Pseudocylindrodon medius – type locality for species
  - †Pseudocylindrodon neglectus – type locality for species
- †Pseudolarix
  - †Pseudolarix americana
- †Pseudomesoreodon – type locality for genus
  - †Pseudomesoreodon rooneyi – type locality for species
- Pseudomyrmex
  - †Pseudomyrmex saxulum – type locality for species
- †Pseudotettigonia
  - †Pseudotettigonia leona – type locality for species
- †Pseudotheridomys
- †Pseudotrimylus
- †Pseudotsuga
  - †Pseudotsuga longifolia
  - †Pseudotsuga sonomensis
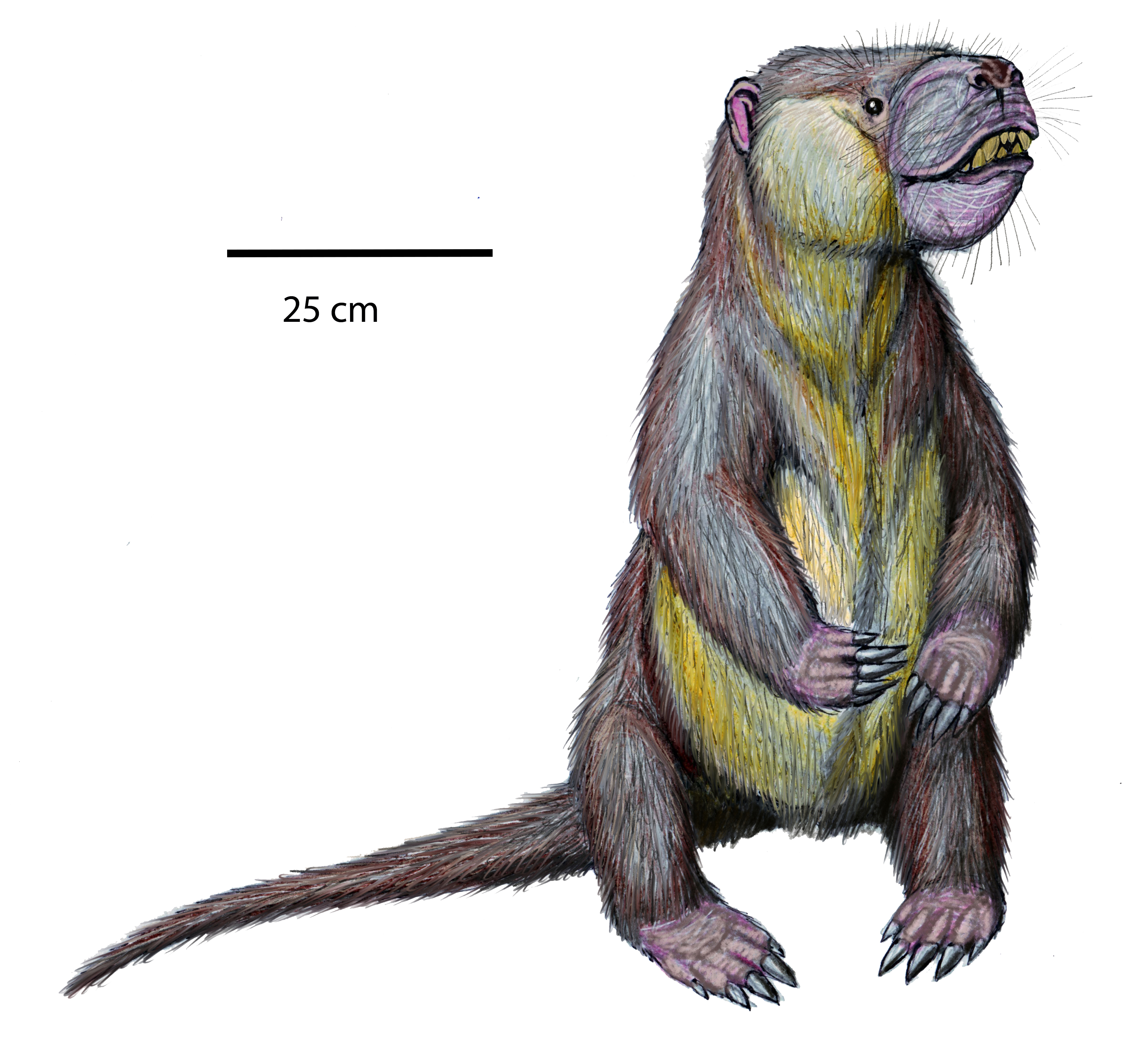
- Life restoration of the Paleocene taeniodont mammal Psittacotherium multifragum
  †Psittacotherium
  - †Psittacotherium multifragum
- Ptelea
  - †Ptelea miocenica
- †Ptenidium
  - †Ptenidium kishenehnicum – type locality for species
- Pteris
- Pterocarya
  - †Pterocarya hispida
- †Ptilodus
  - †Ptilodus kummae
  - †Ptilodus montanus – type locality for species
  - †Ptilodus tsosiensis
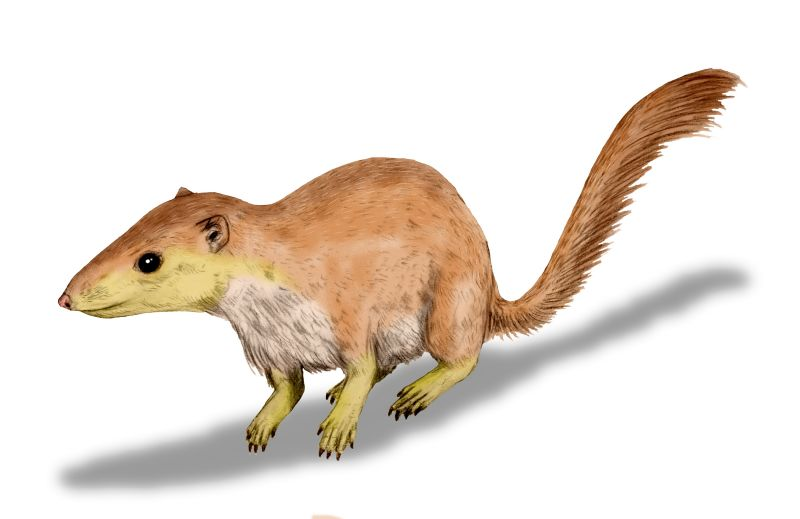
- Life restoration of the Late Cretaceous-Paleocene primate relative Purgatorius
  †Purgatorius
  - †Purgatorius janisae – type locality for species
  - †Purgatorius titusi – type locality for species
  - †Purgatorius unio – type locality for species
- †Pyracantha
  - †Pyracantha spatulata – type locality for species

== Q ==
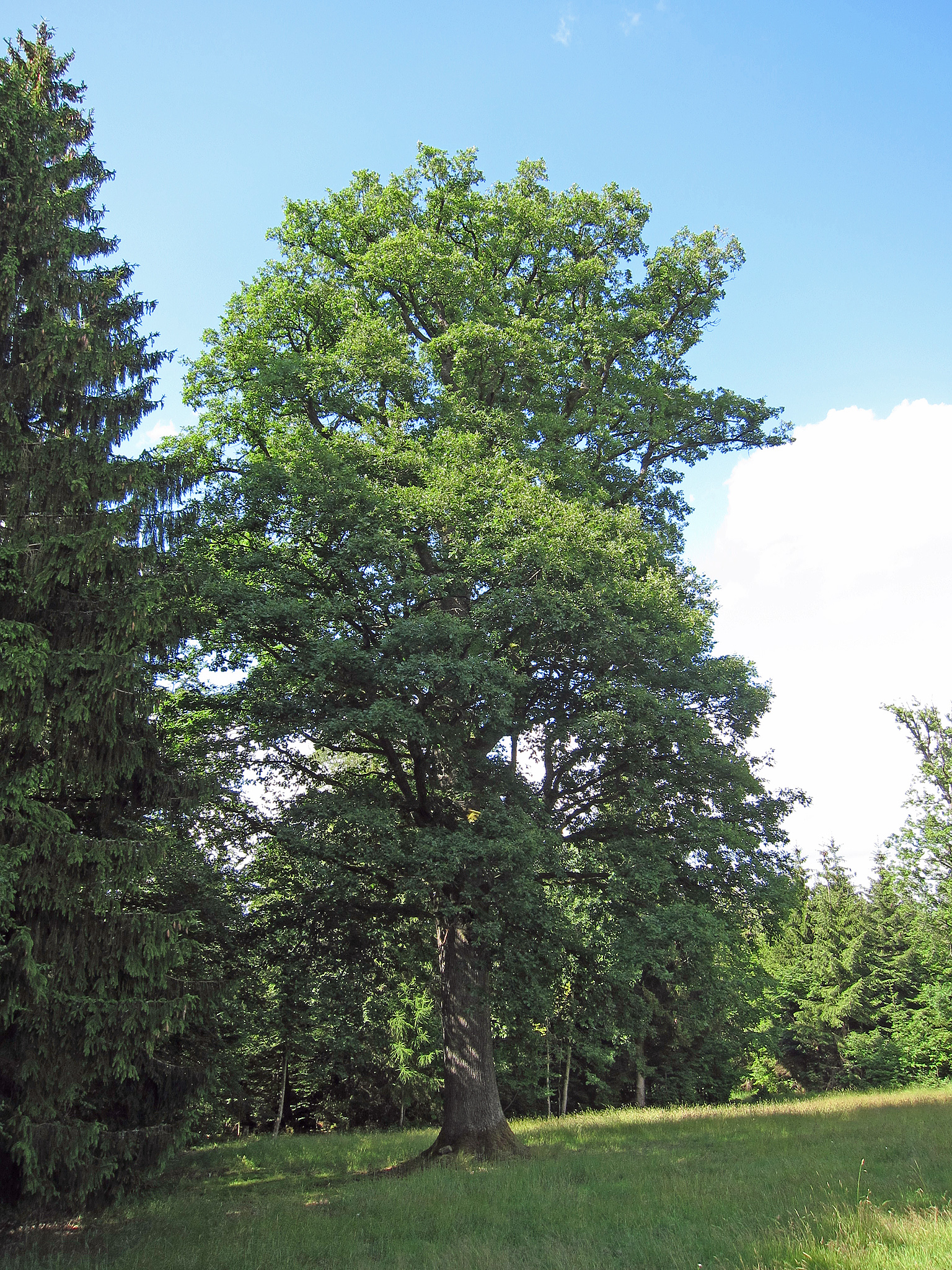
- A living Quercus, or oak tree
  Quercus
  - †Quercus convexa
  - †Quercus dayana
  - †Quercus dispersa – tentative report
  - †Quercus eoprinus
  - †Quercus hannibali
  - †Quercus prelobata
  - †Quercus prevariabilis
  - †Quercus pseudolyrata
  - †Quercus simulata
  - †Quercus sullyi
  - †Quercus winstanleyi

== R ==
- †Rana – or unidentified comparable form
- Rangifer
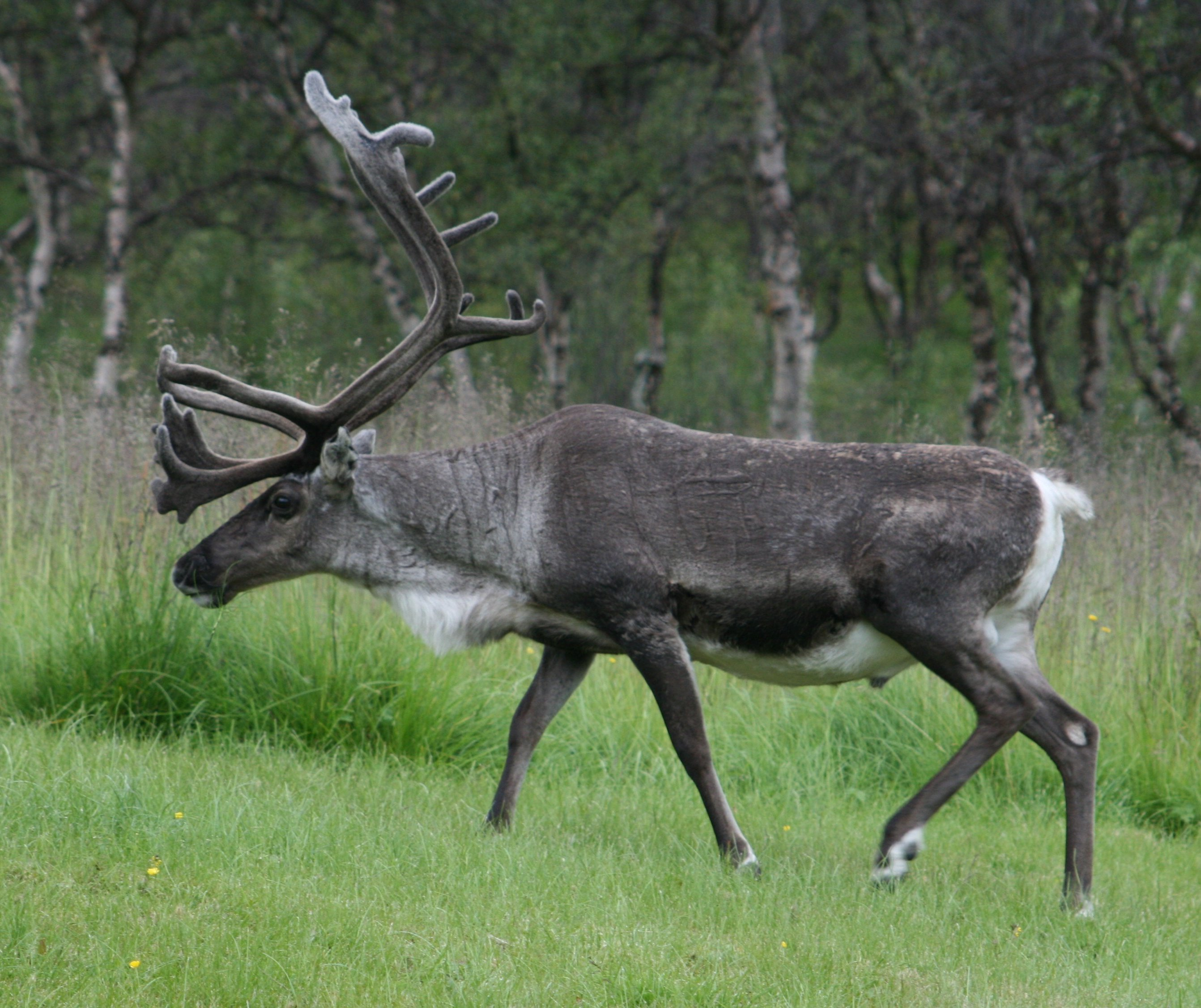
  - A living Rangifer tarandus, or reindeer
    †Rangifer tarandus
- †Rhamnites
  - †Rhamnites pseudostenophyllus
- †Rhamnus
  - †Rhamnus cleburni
  - †Rhamnus crocea
  - †Rhamnus hirsuta
- Rhus
  - †Rhus milleri
  - †Rhus miosuccedanea
  - †Rhus obscura
  - †Rhus praeovata
  - †Rhus stellariaefolia
- †Robinia
  - †Robinia californica
  - †Robinia lesquereuxi
- Rosa
  - †Rosa hilliae

== S ==
- Sabal
  - †Sabal grayana
  - †Sabal imperialis
  - †Sabal powelli
- †Saccoloma
  - †Saccoloma gardneri
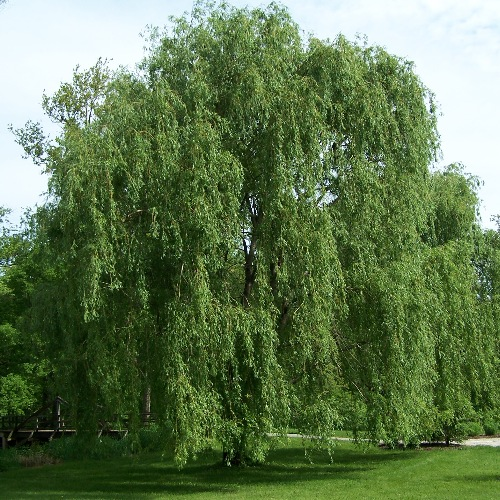
- A living Salix, or willow
  Salix
  - †Salix aquilina
  - †Salix cockerelli
  - †Salix hesperia
  - †Salix knowltoni
  - †Salix laevigatoides
  - †Salix longiacuminata
  - †Salix schimperi
  - †Salix stipulata – type locality for species
  - †Salix succorensis
  - †Salix taxifolioides
  - †Salix truckeana
  - †Salix wildcatensis
  - †Salix wimmeriana
- †Sambucus
  - †Sambucus newtoni
- †Sapindus
  - †Sapindus coloradensis
- Sassafras
  - †Sassafras ashleyi
  - †Sassafras columbiana
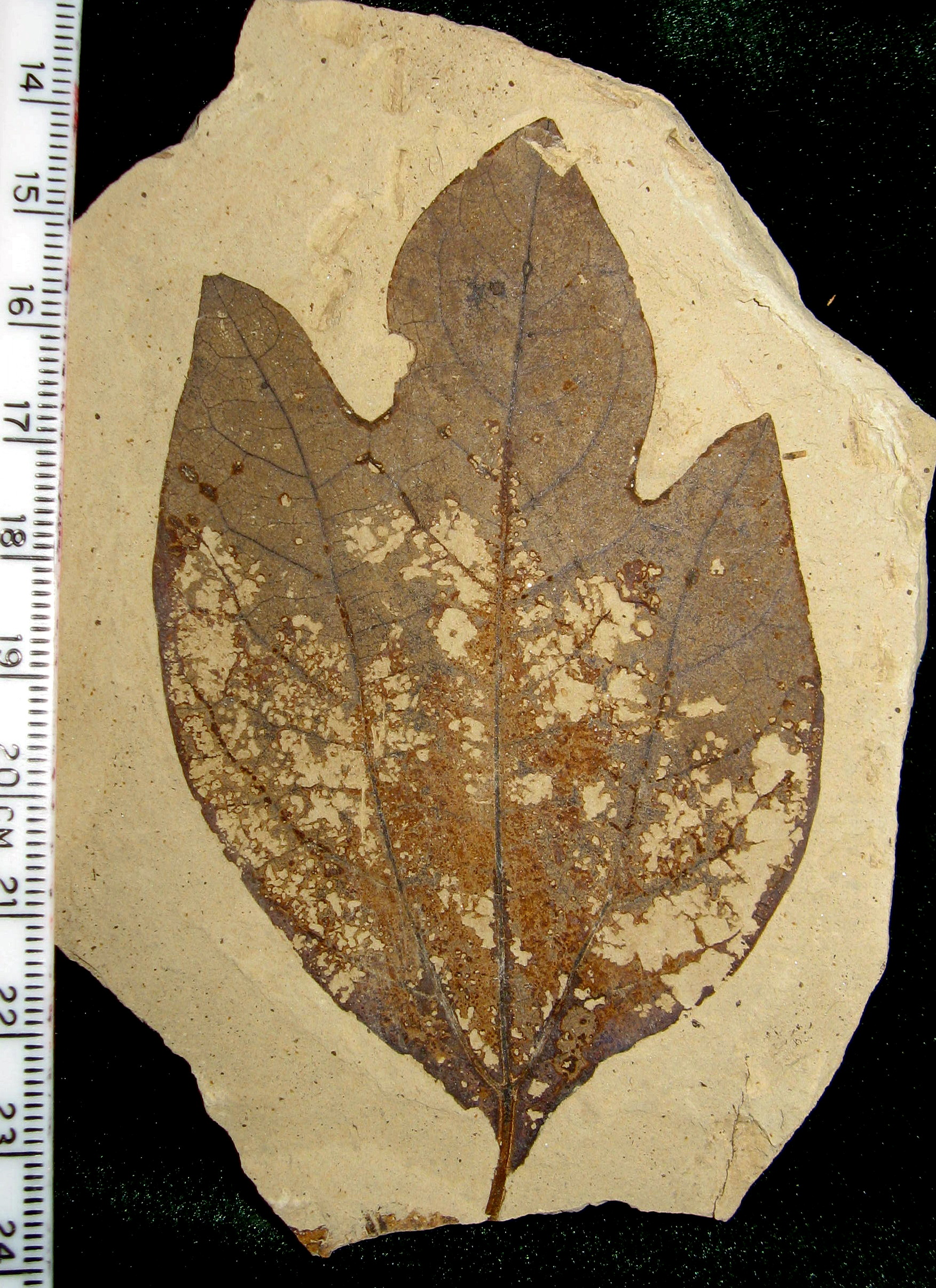
  - Fossilized leaf of the Eocene sassafras Sassafras hesperia
    †Sassafras hesperia
  - †Sassafras thermale
- †Scalopoides
- †Scapherpeton
  - †Scapherpeton tectum
- †Scaphohippus
  - †Scaphohippus intermontanus – or unidentified comparable form
- †Scenopagus
- †Schizotheriodes
  - †Schizotheriodes parvus – type locality for species
- †Scotiophryne – or unidentified comparable form
- †Scottimus
  - †Scottimus longiquus – type locality for species
  - †Scottimus viduus
- †Selaginella
  - †Selaginella collieri
  - †Selaginella monstrosa
- †Senoprosopis
  - †Senoprosopis beckeri – type locality for species
- Sequoia
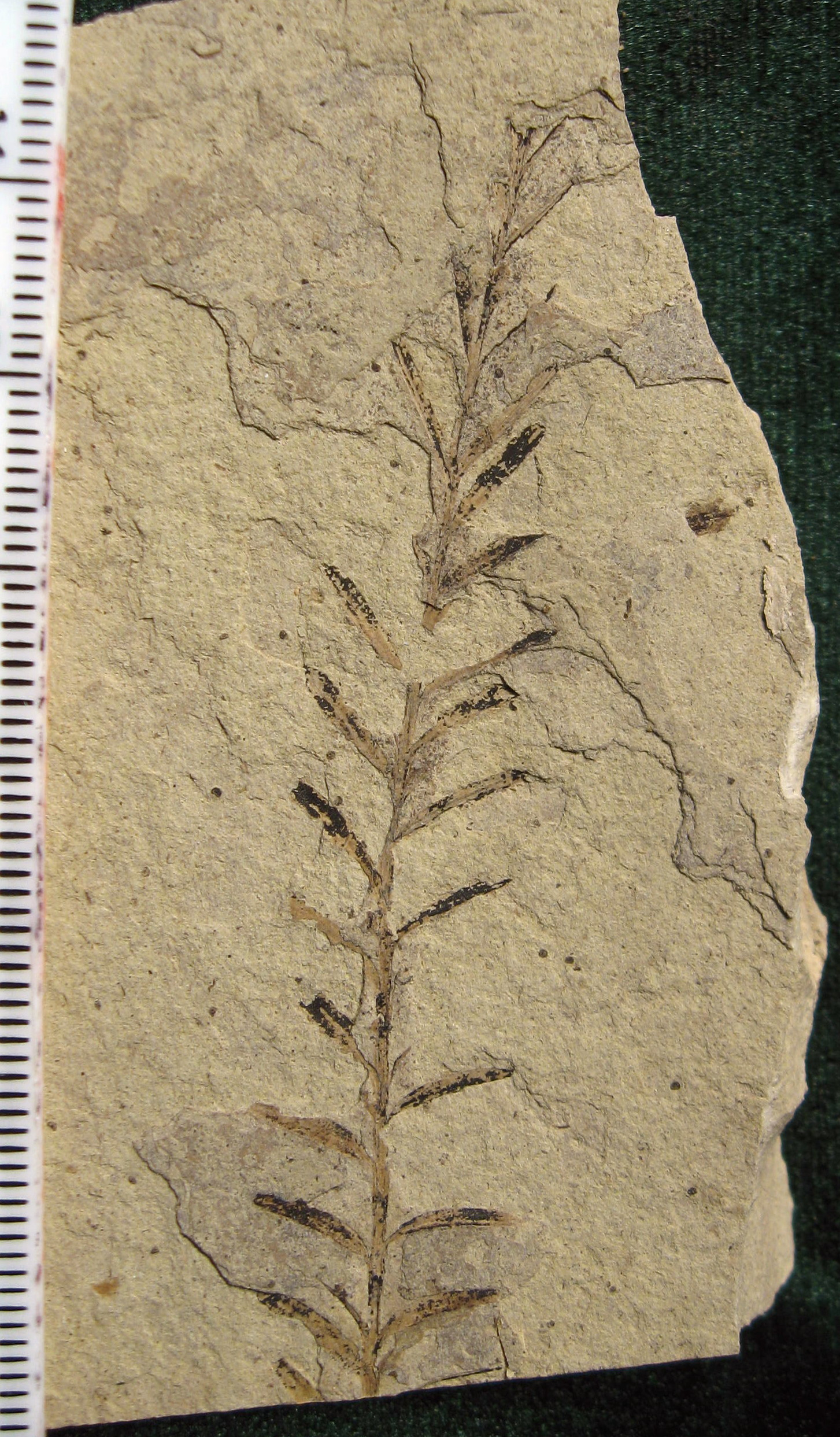
  - Fossilized branch fragment from a Sequoia affinis
    †Sequoia affinis
- †Sespemys – tentative report
- †Simoedosaurus
- †Simpson
  - †Simpson lists
- †Simpsonictis
  - †Simpsonictis tenuis
- †Smilax
  - †Smilax trinervis
- †Solenopsites
  - †Solenopsites abdita – type locality for species
- †Sophora
  - †Sophora spokanensis
- †Sorbus
  - †Sorbus harneyensis
- †Sparganium
  - †Sparganium antiquum
- Spea
  - †Spea neuter
- Spermophilus
  - †Spermophilus jerae – type locality for species
  - †Spermophilus primitivus
  - †Spermophilus richardsonii
- †Spiraea
  - †Spiraea clavidens
  - †Spiraea decurrens
- †Stelocyon
  - †Stelocyon arctylos – type locality for species
- †Steneofiber
  - †Steneofiber gradatus – or unidentified comparable form
  - †Steneofiber hesperus
- †Stenoechinus
  - †Stenoechinus tantalus – type locality for species
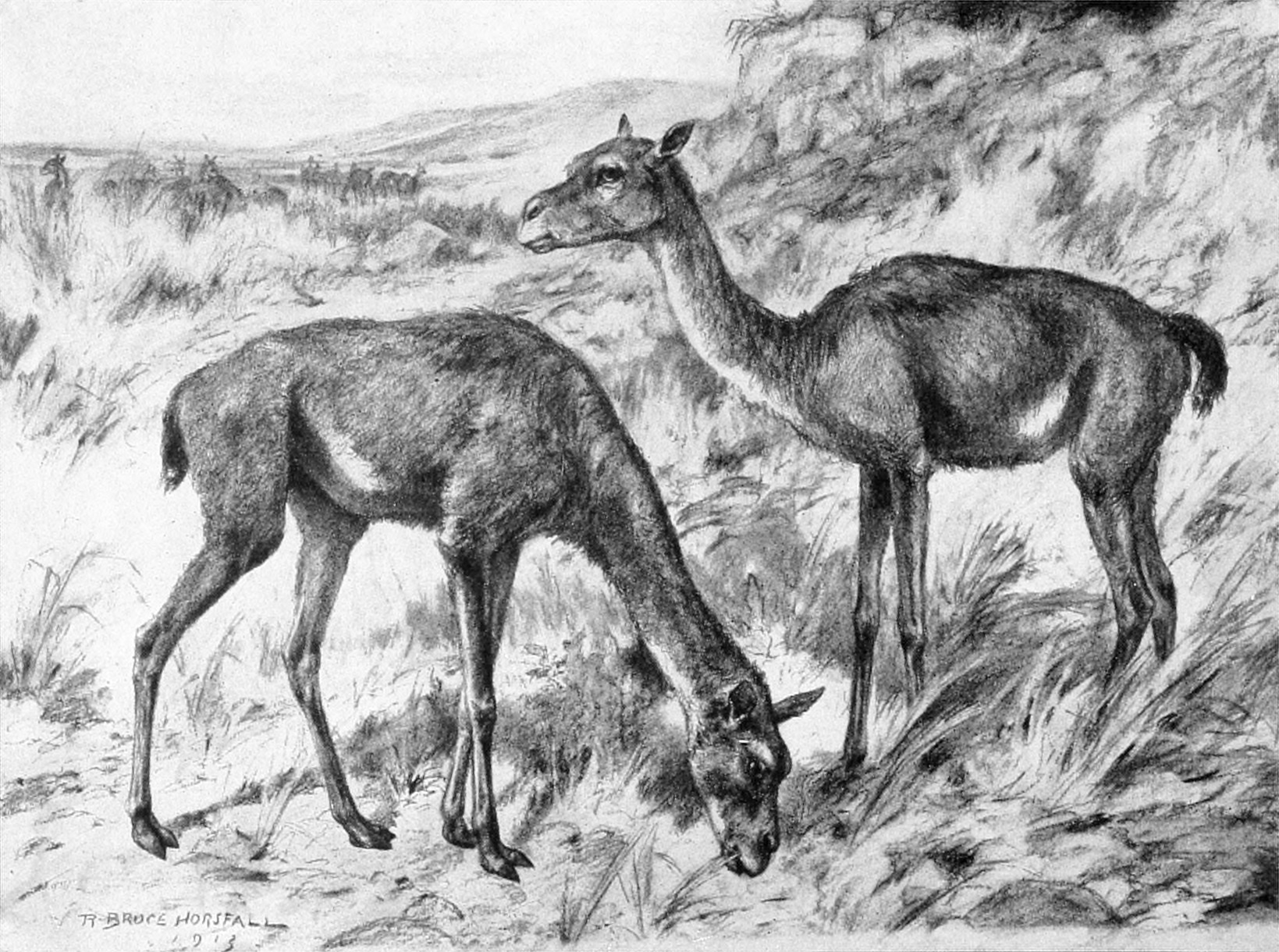
- Life restoration of the Oligocene-Miocene camel Stenomylus
  †Stenomylus
  - †Stenomylus hitchcocki – or unidentified comparable form
- Sterculia
  - †Sterculia wilcoxiana
- †Stibarus
  - †Stibarus montanus – type locality for species
- †Stilpnodon
  - †Stilpnodon simplicidens – type locality for species
- †Stygimys
  - †Stygimys camptorhiza – or unidentified comparable form
  - †Stygimys gratus
  - †Stygimys jepseni – type locality for species
  - †Stygimys kuszmauli – type locality for species
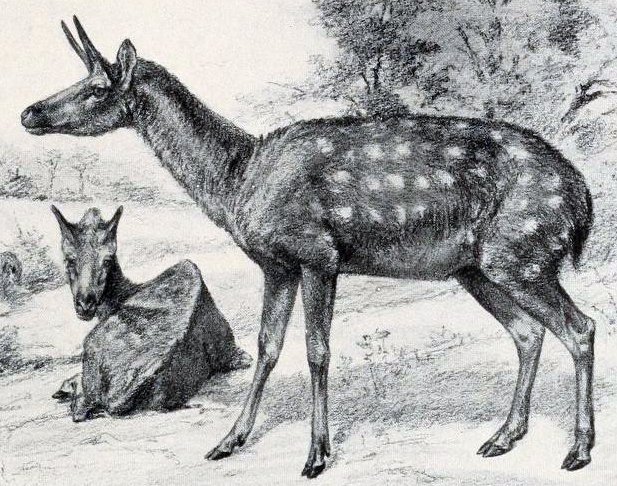
- Life restoration of the Miocene deer relative Subdromomeryx. Robert Bruce Horsfall (1913).
  †Subdromomeryx
  - †Subdromomeryx antilopinus
- †Subhyracodon
  - †Subhyracodon mitis
  - †Subhyracodon occidentalis
- †Submerycochoerus
  - †Submerycochoerus bannackensis – type locality for species
- Sylvicola – or unidentified related form
  - †Sylvicola fenestralis
- Sylvilagus
  - †Sylvilagus nuttallii
- †Symplocarpus
  - †Symplocarpus prefoetidus

== T ==
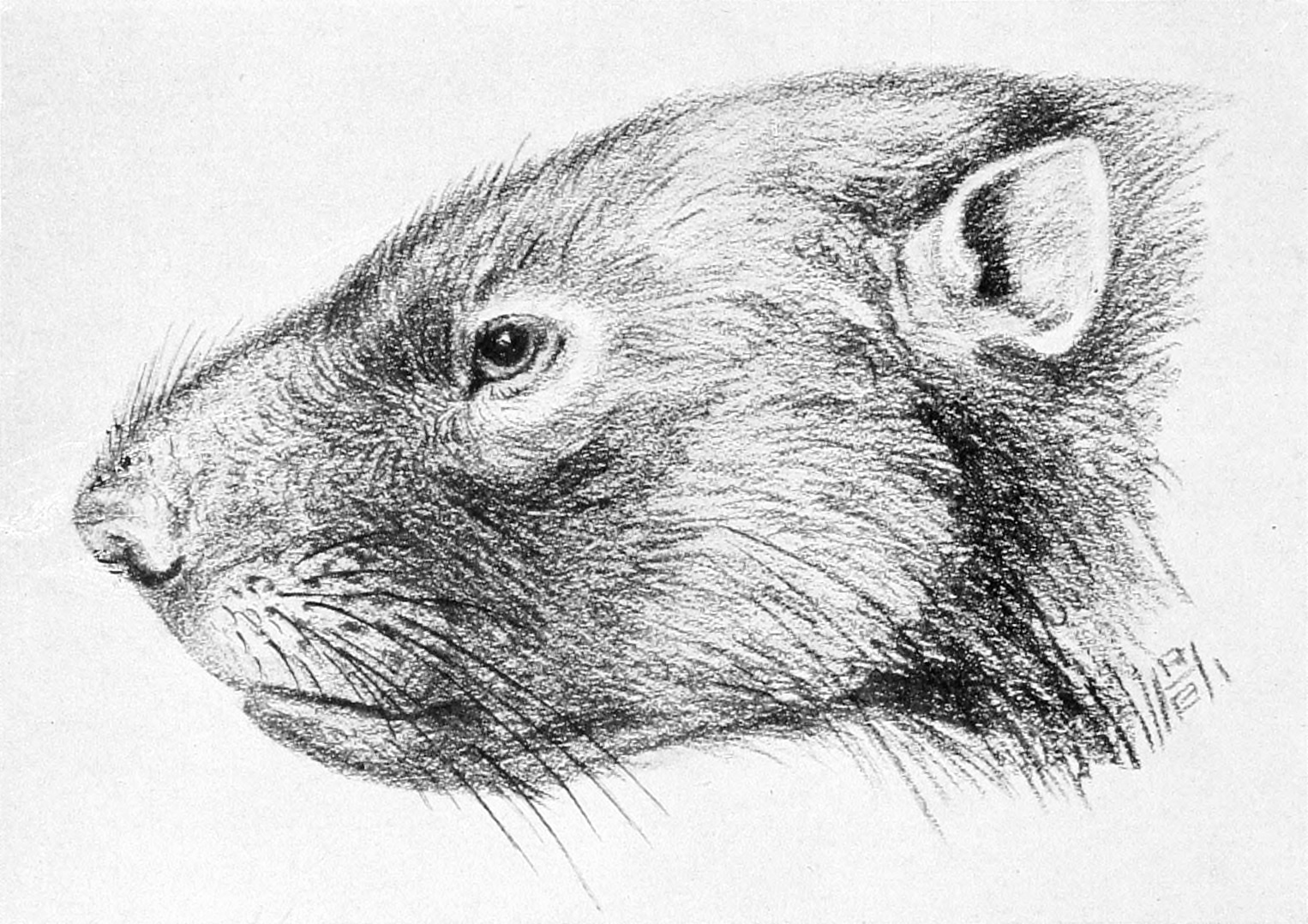
- Restoration of the Paleocene multituberculate mammal Taeniolabis
  †Taeniolabis
  - †Taeniolabis lamberti – type locality for species
- †Tapocyon
  - †Tapocyon robustus
- †Tardontia
  - †Tardontia occidentale – or unidentified comparable form
- Taricha
  - †Taricha miocenica – type locality for species
- Taxodium
  - †Taxodium dubium
  - †Taxodium olriki
- †Tectochara
  - †Tectochara grambastorum
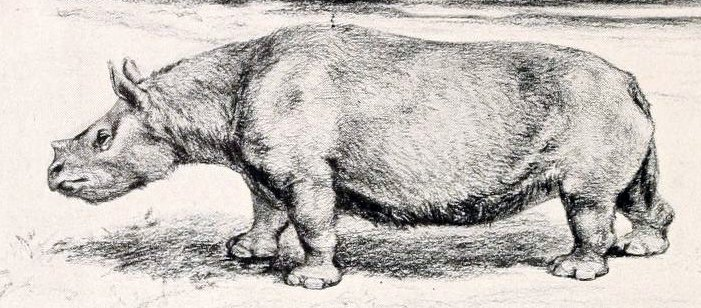
- Restoration of the Miocene-Pliocene rhinoceros Teleoceras
  †Teleoceras
- †Tenudomys – tentative report
- †Tephrodytes – type locality for genus
  - †Tephrodytes brassicarvalis – type locality for species
- †Ternstroemites
  - †Ternstroemites aureavallis
- †Tetraclaenodon
  - †Tetraclaenodon puercensis
- Thomomys
  - †Thomomys taloides
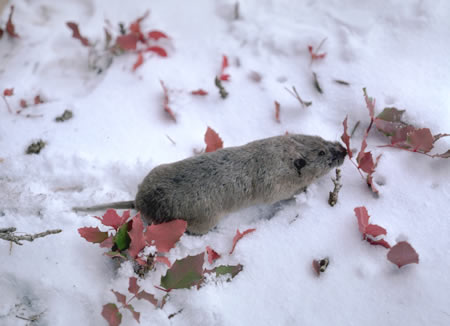
  - A living Thomomys talpoides, or northern pocket gopher
    †Thomomys talpoides
- †Thrinax
  - †Thrinax dorfi
- †Thryptacodon
  - †Thryptacodon australis – or unidentified comparable form
  - †Thryptacodon orthogonius – tentative report
  - †Thryptacodon pseudarctos – type locality for species
- †Thuja
  - †Thuja dimorpha
  - †Thuja interrupta
- †Thylacodon
  - †Thylacodon montanensis – type locality for species
  - †Thylacodon pusillus – or unidentified comparable form
- †Ticholeptus
  - †Ticholeptus zygomaticus
- Tilia
  - †Tilia aspera
  - †Tilia inaequalis
- †Tinuviel
  - †Tinuviel eurydice
- Tipula
  - †Tipula carolae – type locality for species
  - †Tipula rubiensis – type locality for species
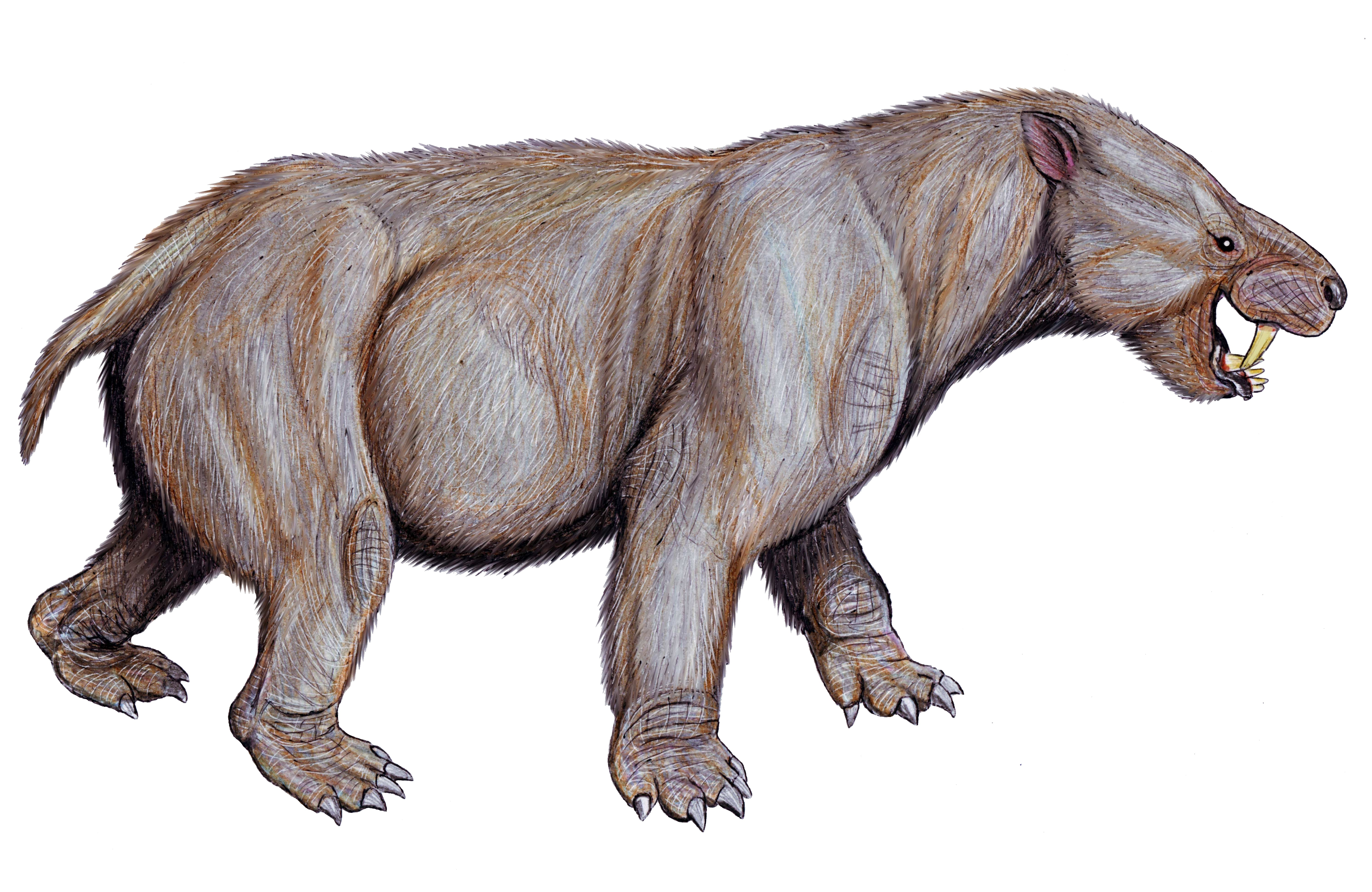
- Life restoration of the Paleocene pantodonts mammal Titanoides
  †Titanoides
  - †Titanoides gidleyi
- †Trapa
  - †Trapa angulata
  - †Trapa paulula
- †Tricentes
  - †Tricentes subtrigonus
- †Trigenicus
  - †Trigenicus profectus
- †Trigonias
  - †Trigonias osborni
- †Trilaccogaulus
  - †Trilaccogaulus montanensis
- †Triplopides
  - †Triplopides rieli – type locality for species
- †Triplopus
  - †Triplopus rhinocerinus – or unidentified comparable form
- †Trochodendroides
  - †Trochodendroides flabella
- †Trogolemur – tentative report
- †Tropidia
  - †Tropidia tumulata – type locality for species
- †Tullochelys
  - †Tullochelys montana
- †Tylocephalonyx
- Typha
  - †Typha lesquereuxi

== U ==
- †Ulmeriella
  - †Ulmeriella rubiensis – type locality for species
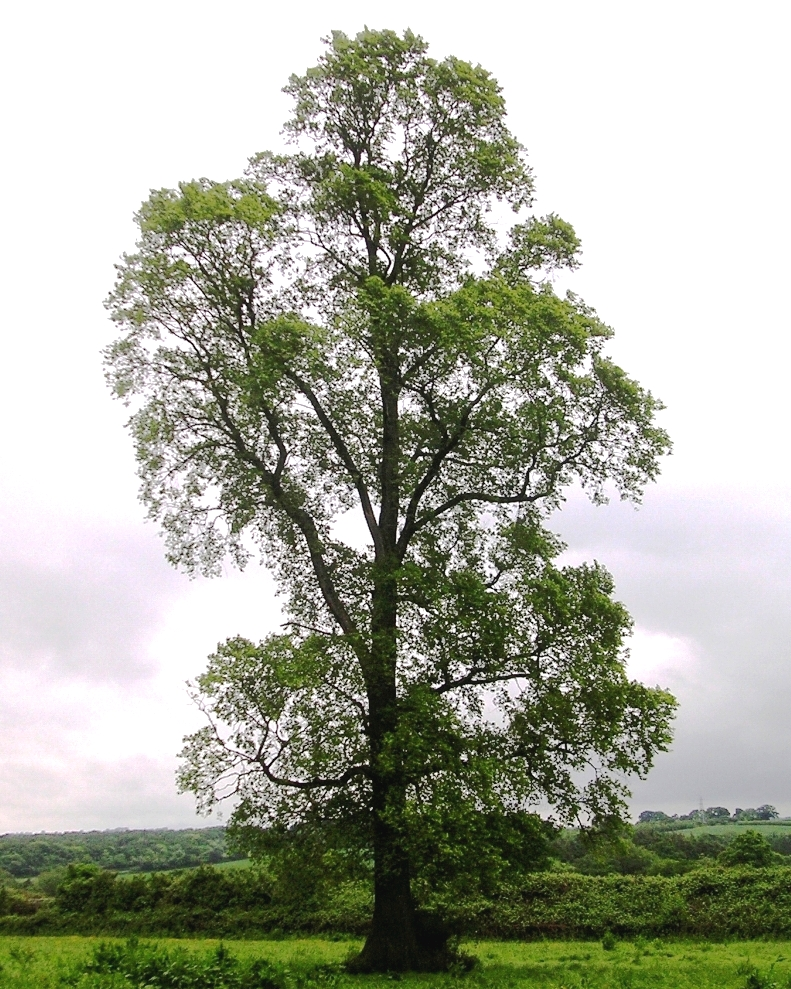
- A living Ulmus, or elm
  Ulmus
  - †Ulmus montanensis
  - †Ulmus moorei
  - †Ulmus paucidentata
  - †Ulmus rhamnifolia
  - †Ulmus speciosa
- †Unuchinia
  - †Unuchinia asaphes – type locality for species
- †Ursolestes – type locality for genus
  - †Ursolestes perpetior – type locality for species
- Ursus

== V ==
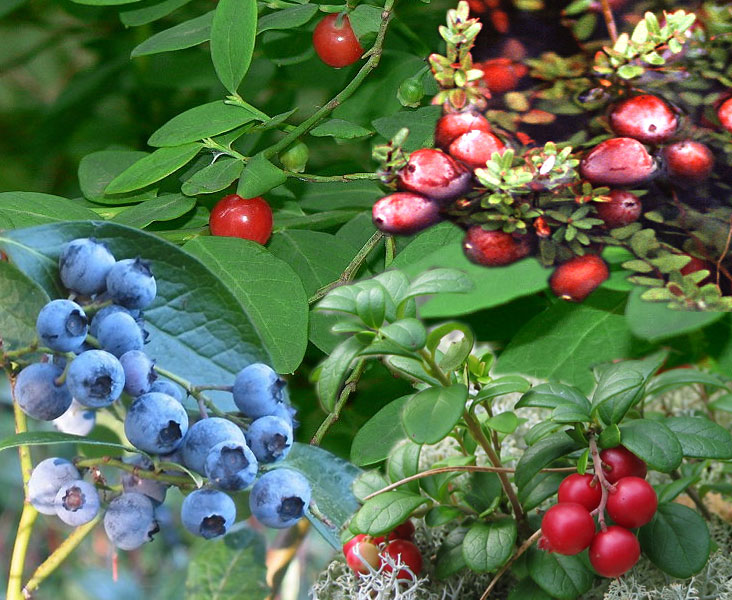
- A variety of modern Vaccinium species, clockwise from top right: cranberries, lingonberries, blueberries, and huckleberries
  †Vaccinium
  - †Vaccinium sophoroides
- †Valenopsalis
  - †Valenopsalis joyneri – type locality for species
- †Vauquelinia
  - †Vauquelinia coloradensis
  - †Vauquelinia coloradica
- †Viburnum
  - †Viburnum antiquorum
  - †Viburnum kraeuseli
- †Viguiera
  - †Viguiera cronquisti
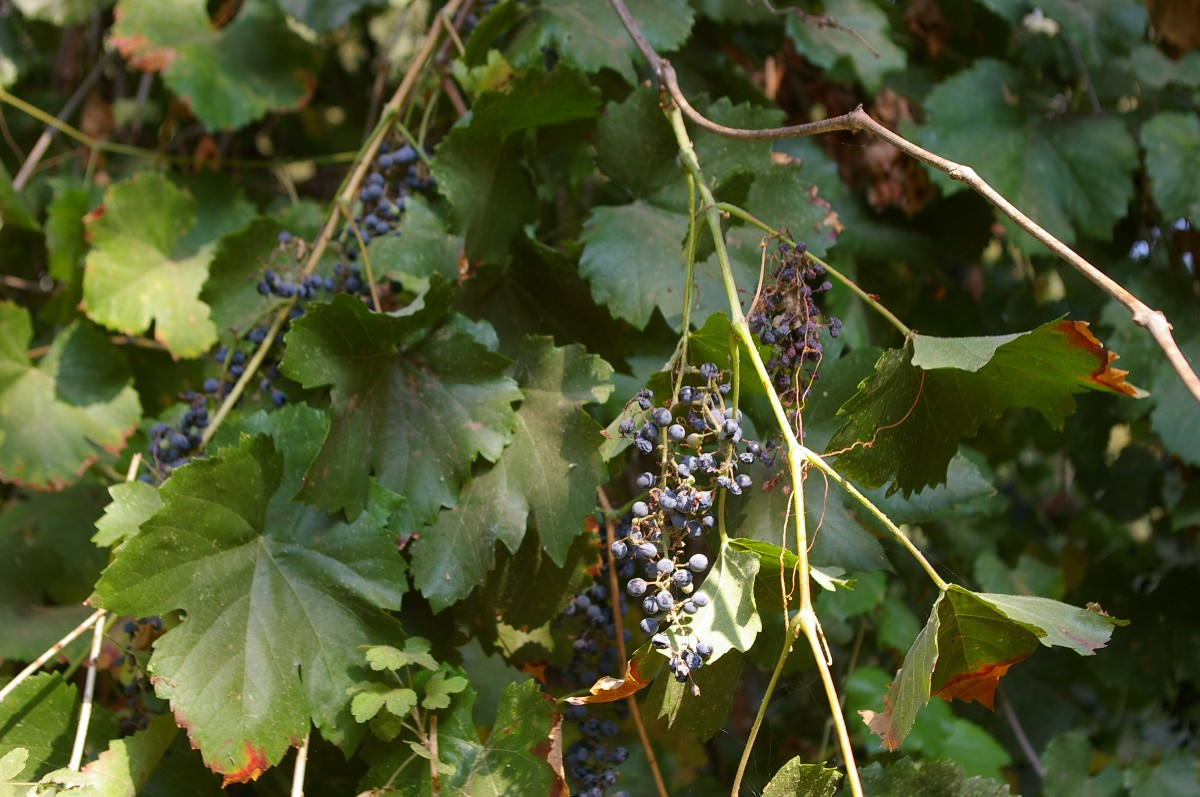
- Leaves and fruit of a living Vitis, or grapevine
  Vitis
  - †Vitis lobata
  - †Vitis muscadinioides
  - †Vitis olriki
  - †Vitis washingtonensis
- †Viverravus – tentative report

== W ==
- †Wilsoneumys
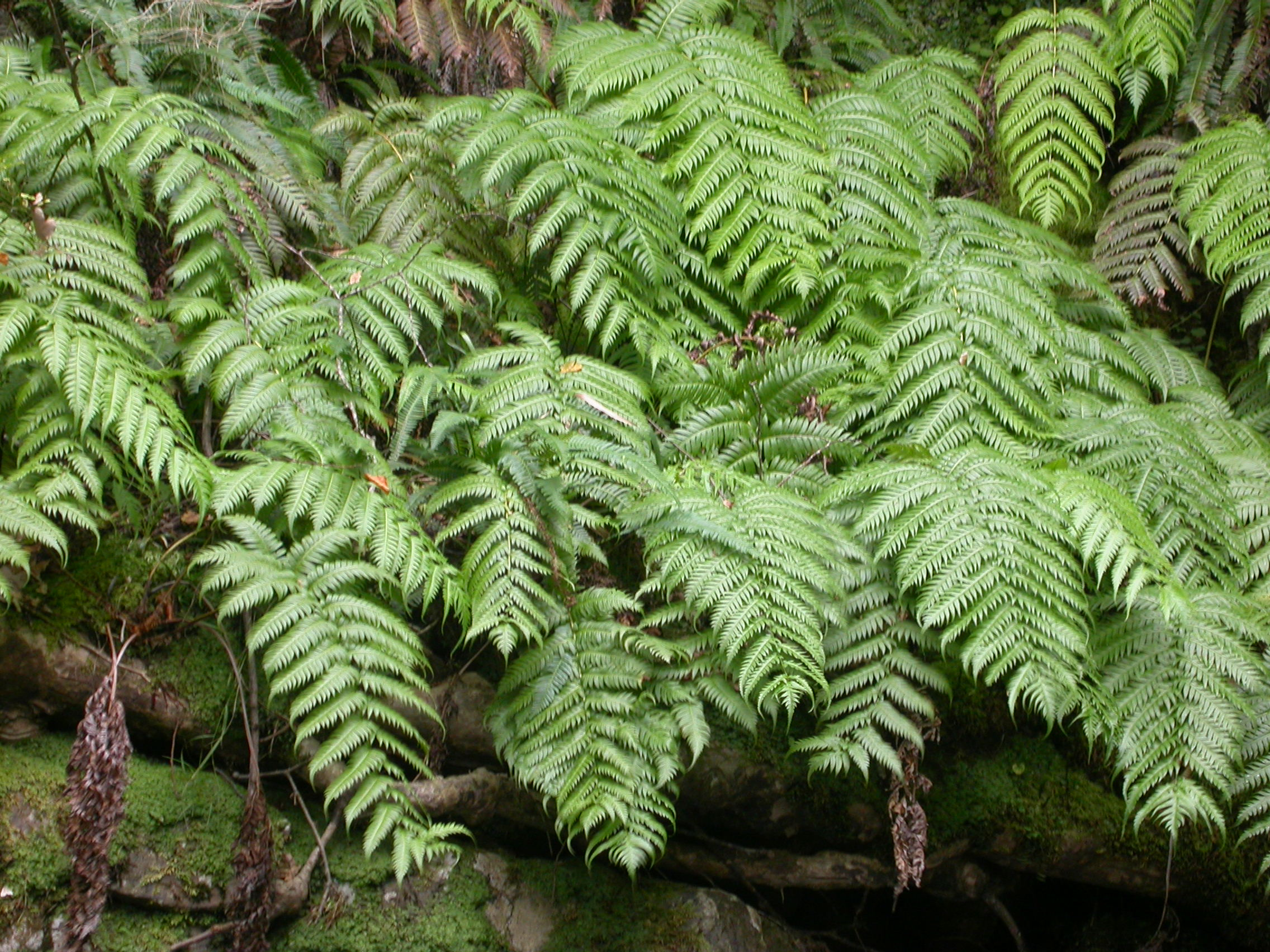
- Living Woodwardia ferns
  †Woodwardia
  - †Woodwardia arctica
- †Wortmania – or unidentified comparable form

== X ==
- †Xyronomys

== Z ==
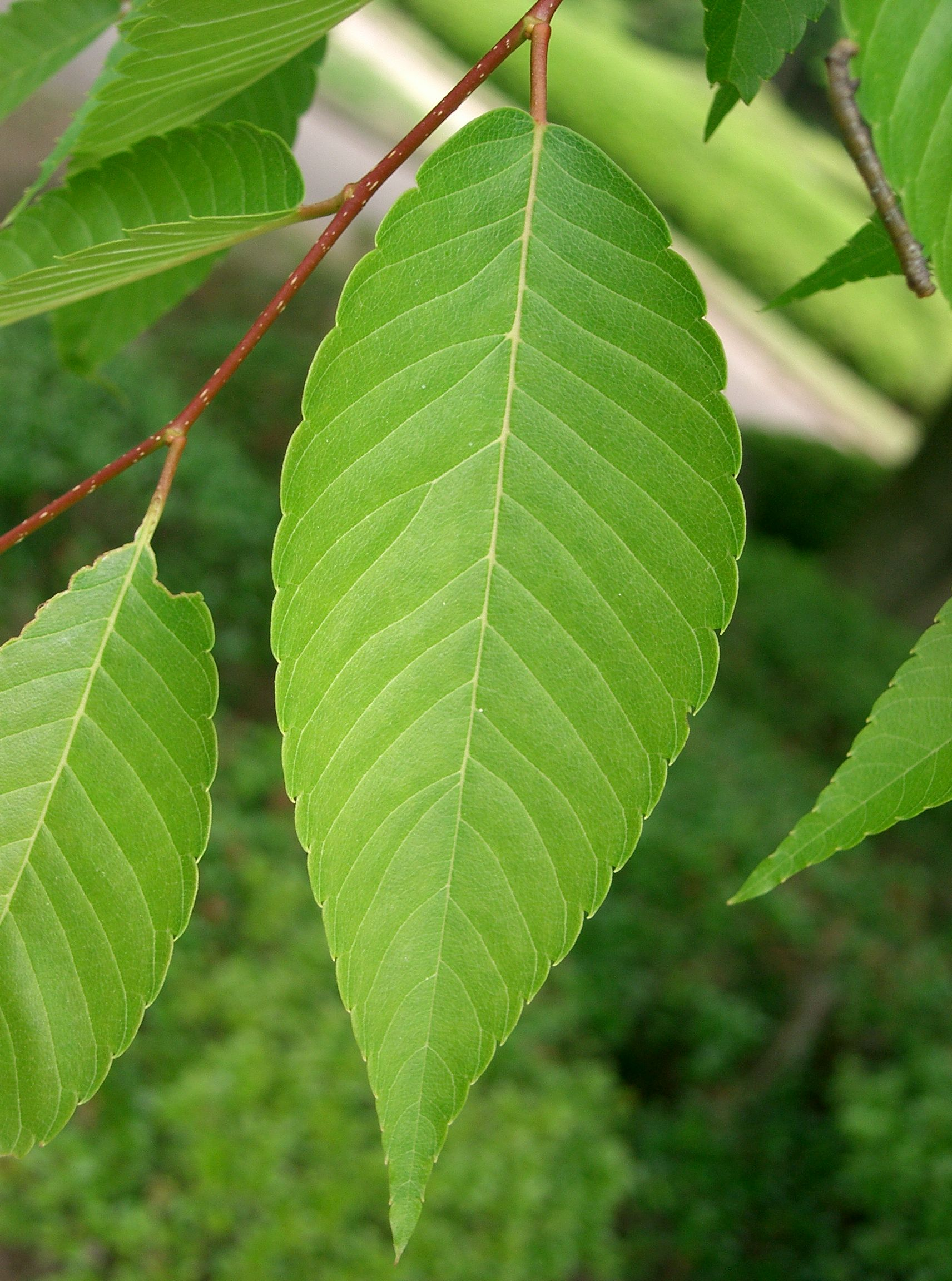
- Leaf of a living Zelkova tree
  Zelkova
  - †Zelkova drymeja
  - †Zelkova hesperia
  - †Zelkova krymeja
  - †Zelkova nervosa
  - †Zelkova oregoniana
  - †Zelkova planeroides
  - †Zelkova ungeri
- †Zeunerella – tentative report
  - †Zeunerella lewisi – type locality for species
- †Zygodactylus
  - †Zygodactylus ochlurus – type locality for species
