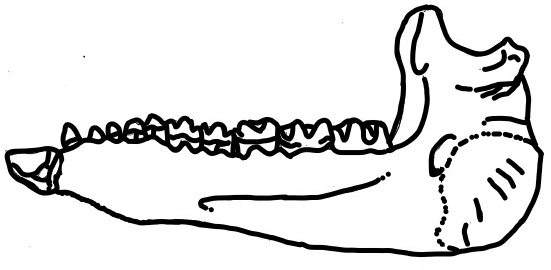
- Drawing of the holotype jaw IVPP V.2769.

Scientific classification
- Kingdom: Animalia
- Phylum: Chordata
- Class: Mammalia
- Order: Perissodactyla
- Family: †Paraceratheriidae
- Genus: †Urtinotherium; Chow & Chiu, 1963

Species
- †U. intermedium; †U. incisivum Chow & Chiu, 1963; †U. yagouense (Qui et al., 2004); †U. parvum (Chow, 1958)

Synonyms
- Turpanotherium? Qui & Wang, 2007; Species synonyms: †Urtinotherium yagouense: †Paraceratherium yagouense Qui et al., 2004; †Turpanotherium yagouense (Qui et al., 2004); †Turpanotherium elegans Qui & Wang, 2007; †Urtinotherium parvum: †Indricotherium parvum Chow, 1958; †Indricotherium qujigensis Tang, 1978

= Urtinotherium =

Urtinotherium Temporal range: Eocene to Early Oligocene, 47–35 Ma

Extinct genus of mammals

Urtinotherium (meaning "Urtyn beast" in Ancient Greek) is an extinct genus of paracerathere mammals. It was a large animal that was closely related to Paraceratherium, and found in rocks dating from the Late Eocene to Early Oligocene period. The remains were first discovered in the Urtyn Obo region (now Dorbod Banner, Ulanqab) in Inner Mongolia, which the name Urtinotherium is based upon. Other referred specimens are from northern China.

== Classification ==
Urtinotherium pertains to the Paraceratheriidae subfamily Paraceratheriinae. These in turn are part of the superfamily Rhinocerotoidea and therefore represent close relatives of modern rhinoceroses. The paraceratheres are distinguished by the formation of large sharp incisors in their upper and lower jaws, while rhinoceroses only have a two on the lower jaw. Urtinotherium was thought of by Leonard Radinsky to be a transitional form between earlier paraceratheres, like Juxia, and later forms, such as Paraceratherium and Indricotherium (now Paraceratherium transouralicum).

This genus represents a primitive form of paracerathere that developed in the late Eocene. It is possibly descended from Juxia, which lived during the Middle Eocene in northern China, and which shares with it having a full set of teeth in its jaws. However, Urtinotherium differs by its larger body size and greater specialization in the incisors. Urtinotherium and later Paraceratherium form the most derived section of the largest known rhinocerotoid lineage. In their specialization emphasizes that compared to Urtinotherium, they possessed significantly reduced dentition with only a couple of incisors in the lower jaw.

The first description of Urtinotherium was published in 1963 by Zhou Ming-Zhen and Chiu Chan-Siang, based on the lower jaw. The type species is recognized as Urtinotherium incisivum. The genus name comes from the location, and from the Ancient Greek word θηρίον (therion) meaning "beast". The species name refers to its elongated incisivos.

== Description ==
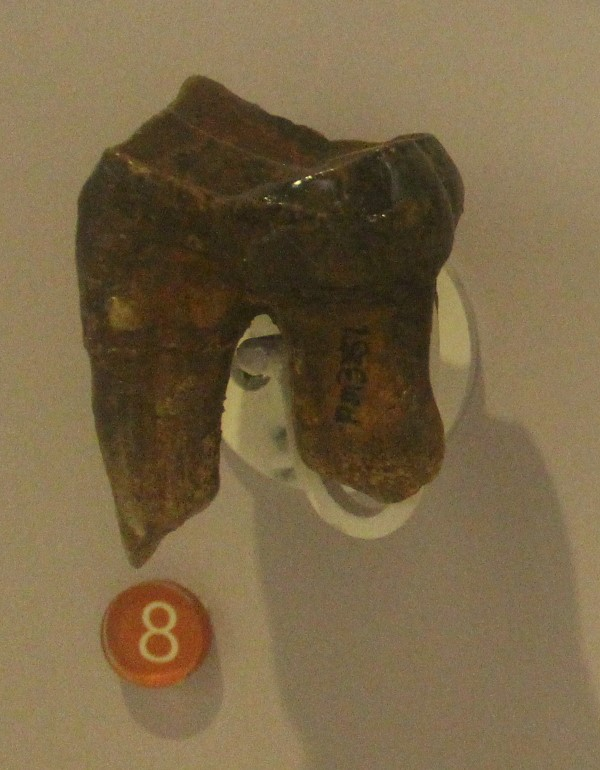
Tooth, National Natural History Museum of China

Urtinotherium was a representative of the large family Paraceratheriidae, and almost reached the proportions of Paraceratherium. Urtinotherium evolved from Juxia and represents the beginning of paracerathere gigantism. U. parvum was the smallest species within the genus, weighing 2.6 tonnes (5,700 lb). U. intermedium was the largest species within the genus 4.9–6.1 tonnes (11,000–13,000 lb), based on limb bones and m1 regressions respectively. This made U. intermedium among the largest animals living in its environment, alongside the brontothere Embolotherium. It is known from several findings in central and eastern Asia, though no complete skeletons are known. The holotype fossil (catalog number IVPP V.2769) includes a complete lower jaw 71.5 cm (28.1 in) in length, comparable to the smallest known of Paraceratherium. The jaw is wedge shaped, very low in height, and with elongated branches. The symphysis was solid and extended to the beginning of the second premolars. The jaw's dentition is complete, having three front incisors and canine. The first two incisors protrude forward with a crown length of 4.9 cm (1.9 in), with forms similar to daggers. The other incisors and canines had much smaller crowns. Between each tooth is a small space, similar to its phylogenetically primitive relatives such as Juxia. Its back teeth, which are separated from the front teeth by a small diastema, consist of four premolars and three molars. These are similar in structure to those of Paraceratherium, with small premolars and larger molars. The latter have low crowns (are brachyodont) and had few enamel folds.

== Paleoecology ==
The remains of Urtinotherium are found mainly in the eastern and central Asia, consisting mostly of jaw fragments and isolated teeth. The holotype jaw was found in the early 1960s in the Erlian Basin of Inner Mongolia, which dates from the Late Eocene. Additional findings came from Yunnan province in China and Late Eocene deposits of Khoer-Dzan in Mongolia. Further findings have been made in Saissansee Aksyir Svita basin in eastern Kazakhstan, also of the same age. Urtinotherium likely survived into the Early Oligocene, as fossils probably from it have been found in the Mera Formation of Transylvania, Romania.

The Ergilin Dzo Formation was initially to have been a relatively closed environment, with a warm and humid climate, based on the presence of brontotheres and the abundance of low crowned herbivores. Despite this, the absence of primates and rarity of crocodyliforms suggests there were more open areas and it was more arid than other contemporary formations. Sedimentary analysis within Khoer-Dzan found sediments of red soils, which are associated with floodplain environments, with no evidence of lacustrine environments.

U. parvum coexisted with other herbivores such as the rhinocerotid Ronzotherium orientale, the anthracothere Bothriodon, the praetragulid Praetragulus electus, the brontothere Embolotherium andrewsi, and the chalicothere Schizotherium avitum. Contemporary predators within the fauna include the hyaenodont Hyaenodon, nimravids such as Eofelis and Nimravus intermedius, and entelodonts Brachyhyops trofimovi and Entelodon gobiensis.
