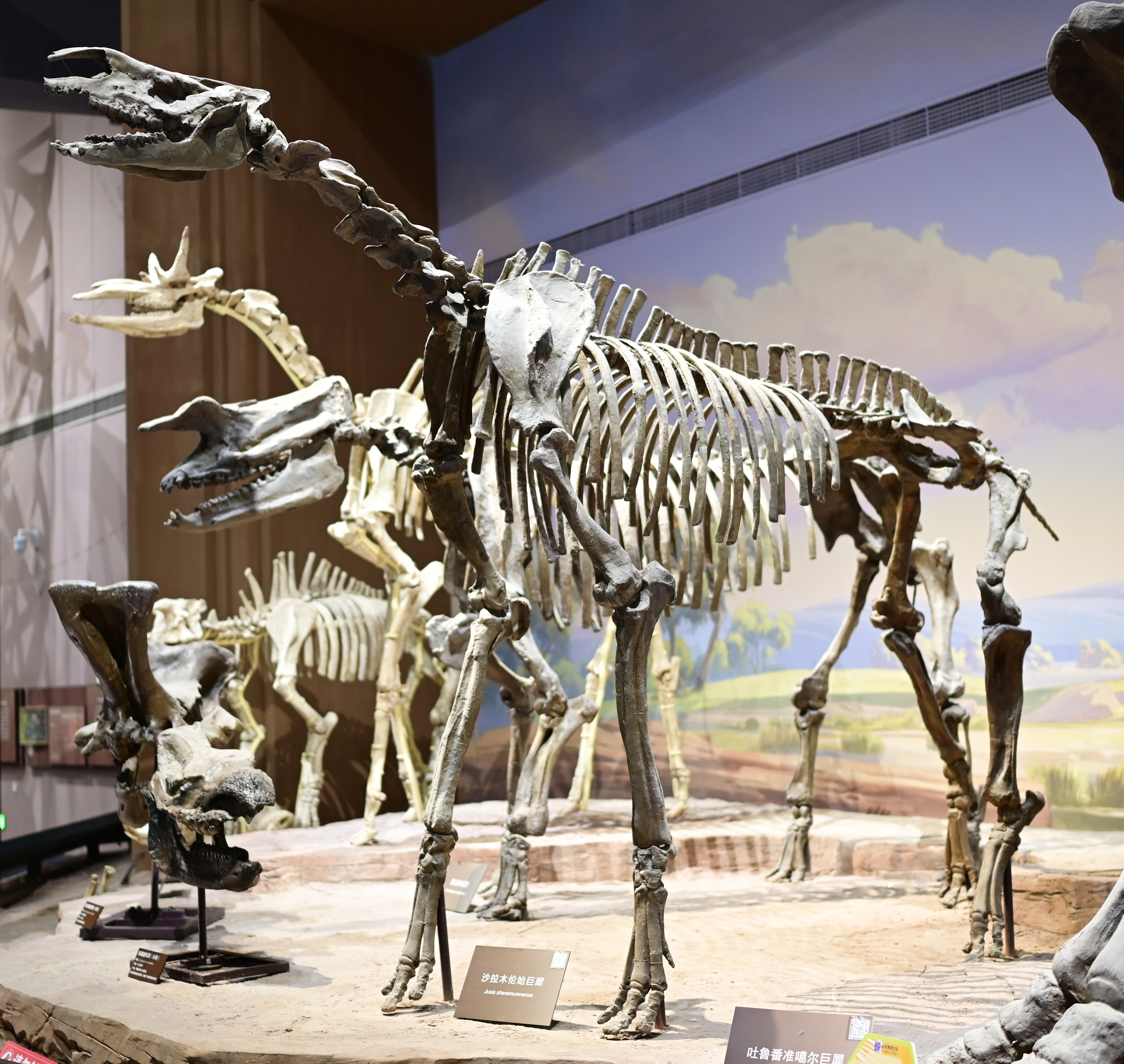
- Mounted skeleton, Baoding Natural History Museum

Scientific classification
- Kingdom: Animalia
- Phylum: Chordata
- Class: Mammalia
- Order: Perissodactyla
- Suborder: Ceratomorpha
- Superfamily: Rhinocerotoidea
- Family: †Paraceratheriidae
- Genus: †Juxia; Chow & Chiu, 1964

Type species
- †Juxia sharamurenensis Chow & Chiu, 1964

Species
- †J. sharamurenensis Chow & Chiu, 1964; †J. borissiaki (Beliajeva, 1959); †J. shoui Qi & Zhou, 1989

Synonyms
- Imequinincisoria Wang, 1976; Species synonyms: Juxia sharamurenensis: Juxia sharamurenense Chow & Chiu, 1964; Forstercooperia sharamurenense Radinsky, 1967; Juxia sharamurenensis Chiu & Wang, 2007; Juxia borissiaki: Eotrigonias borissiaki Beliajeva, 1959; Forstercooperia ergiliinensis Gabuniya & Dashzeveg, 1974; Imequinincisoria mazhuangensis Wang, 1976; Imequinincisoria micrasis Wang, 1976

= Juxia =

Juxia Temporal range: Lutetian–Rupelian

Extinct genus of mammals

Juxia ('joo-she-a'; from Chinese: 巨犀; pinyin: Jùxī; lit. 'gigantic rhinoceros') is an extinct genus belonging to the family Paraceratheriidae, a group of hornless herbivorous mammals that are related to the modern rhinoceros, that lived in Asia during the upper Eocene. The type species is J. sharamurenensis, named by Zhou Mingzhen and Qiu Zhanxiang in 1964. It is believed to be the ancestor of all giant rhinocerotoids such as Paraceratherium and Dzungariotherium.

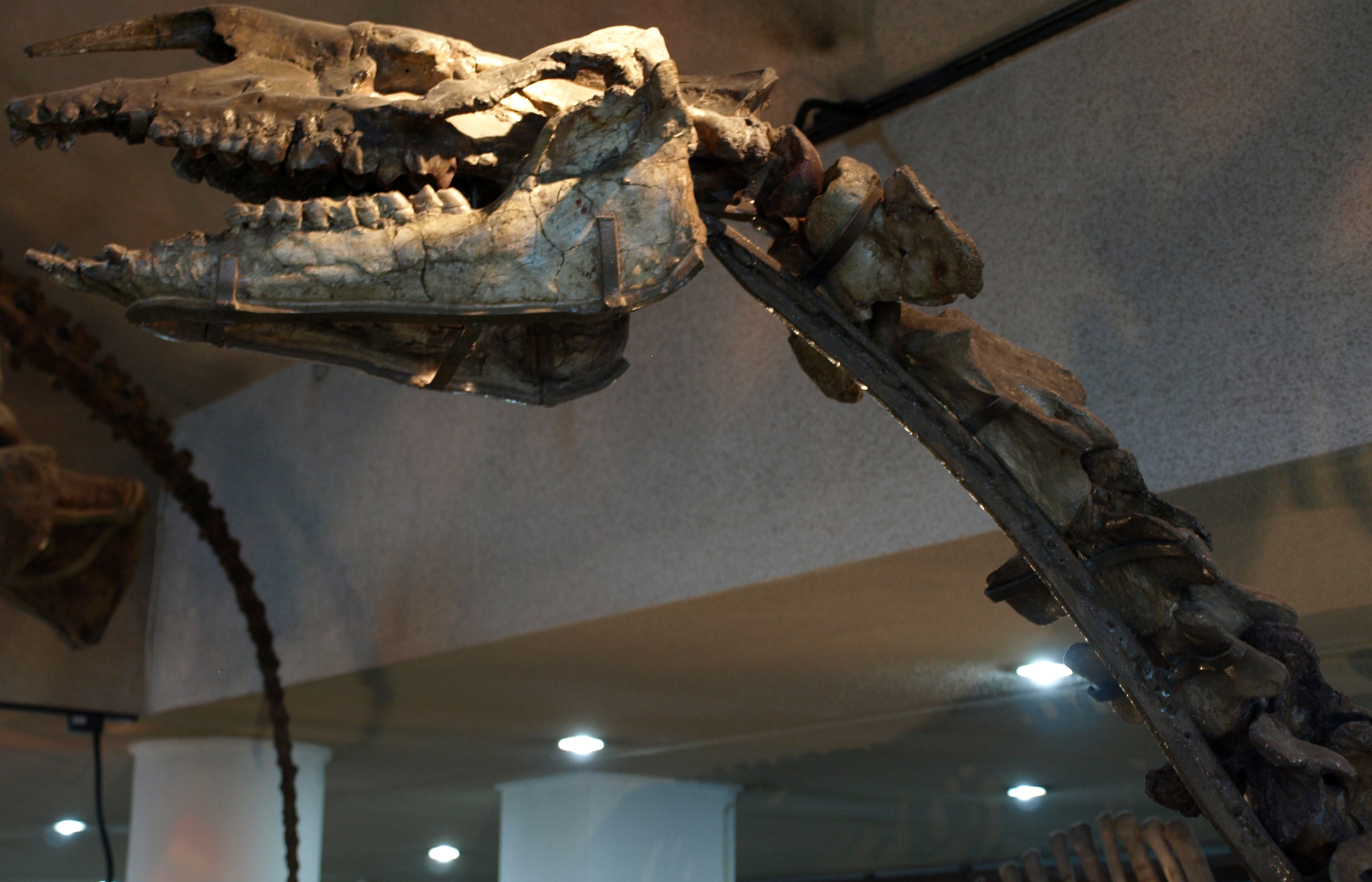
Skull and neck of a mounted specimen of Juxia sharamurenensis, Paleozoological Museum of China

As an early paraceratheriid, Juxia was a medium-sized animal, around 3 metres (9.8 ft) in full-body length, 1.9 metres (6.2 ft) in shoulder height, and 2.2 metres (7.2 ft) in standing height. It had a body mass estimated at 749–888 kilograms (1,651–1,958 lb) or 1,482 kilograms (3,267 lb), held by elongated long legs and small skull firmly attached to a relatively long neck. Based on its triangular-like teeth and sharp protruding incisors, Juxia was probably a strict browser, feeding on ferns and leaves on branches where most herbivorous mammals could not reach. In terms of habitat, Juxia lived in densely lush and tropical forests of what is now China and India. Though a few skeletons have been found, it is unclear whether this animal was permanently solitary or lived in small social groups, possibly harems. Based on its morphology, its long legs probably enabled it to run relatively fast for limited duration. This was probably a defense mechanism against early mammalian predators.
