= Alexei Petrovich Pavlov =

Russian palaentologist (1854–1929)

Aleksey Pavlov
- Алексей Павлов
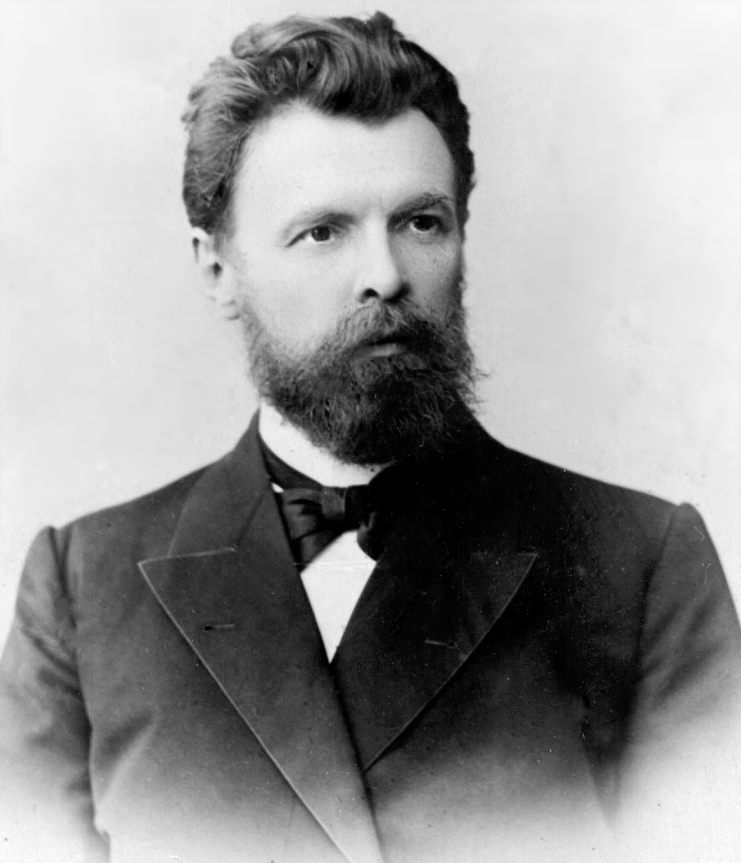
- Pavlov in 1917
- Born: 1 December [O.S. 19 November] 1854
- Died: 9 September 1929 (aged 74)
- Known for: Contributions to stratigraphy

Aleksey Petrovich Pavlov (Russian: Алексей Петрович Павлов; 1 December [O.S. 19 November] 1854 – 9 September 1929) was a Russian Imperial geologist and paleontologist, who made a significant contribution in the field of stratigraphy. He was professor at Moscow Imperial University and an academician of the St. Petersburg Imperial Academy of Sciences. He published more than 160 works, especially in the fields of stratigraphy and paleontology.

He was married to Maria Vasilievna (nee Gortynskaya) Pavlova who is noted for her work as a paleontologist and academician. The Museum of Paleontology at Moscow State University is named to honor them jointly for their contributions to the field.
