= Maria Pavlova =

Ukrainian paleontologist

- Мария Павлова
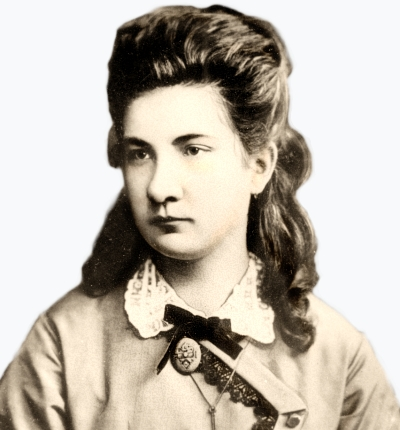
- Pavlova in 1874
- Born: June 26, 1854; Kozelets, Russian Empire
- Died: December 23, 1938 (aged 84)
- Education: University of Paris (Sorbonne)
- Known for: Research on and naming of Tertiary mammals
- Spouse(s): Illich-Shishatskaya; Alexei P. Pavlov
- Scientific career
- Fields: Paleontology

Maria Vasilievna Pavlova (Note: Variant spellings include Marie and Mariia for her given name and Pavlov or Pavlow for her surname by marriage.) (Russian: Мария Васильевна Павлова; née Gortynskaia (Гортынская); June 26, 1854 – December 23, 1938) was a Ukrainian who became a paleontologist and academician in Moscow during the Russian Empire and Soviet era. She is known for her research on the fossils of and the naming of hoofed-mammals of the Tertiary period. She was a professor at Moscow State University. She also made great efforts to establish the Museum of Paleontology at the university. In 1926, the museum was named after her and her second husband, Alexei Petrovich Pavlov, a geologist, paleontologist, and academician who made a significant contribution in the field of stratigraphy.

== Early life ==
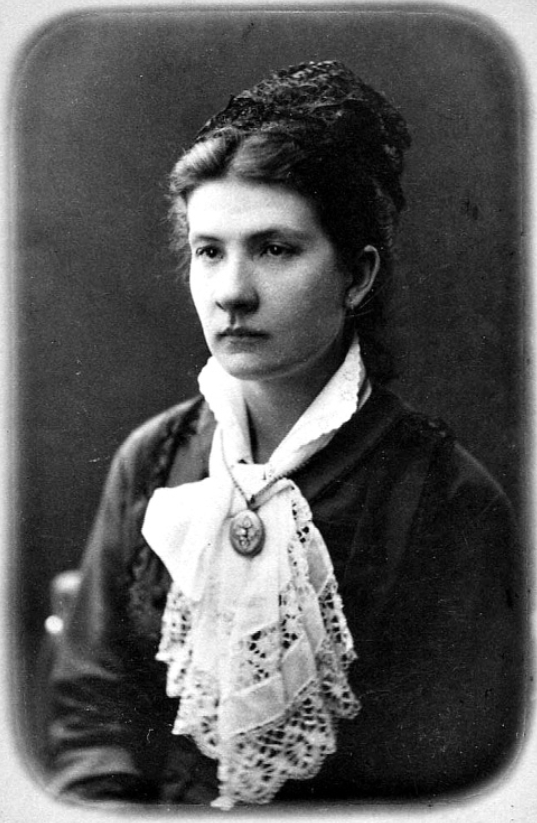
in 1880

Maria Vasillievna Gortynskaia was born in Kozelets, Ukraine in 1854. She was schooled at home until the age of eleven in 1865. Her secondary education was at the Institute for Noble Maidens in Kiev, which she completed in 1870 at the age of sixteen. Her first marriage was to Illich-Shishatsky, who died shortly after their wedding.

In 1880, she moved to Paris to study. She studied a number of natural history subjects and pursued research at the National Museum of Natural History in Paris, under Professor Albert Gaudry. She also studied at the University of Paris.

After graduation from the Sorbonne in 1884, she moved to Moscow and married geologist and paleontologist Alexei P. Pavlov, whom she had met in Paris. He was a geologist, a paleontologist, an academician who was a professor at Moscow University and the St. Petersburg Imperial Academy of Sciences. He is known for his significant contributions to the field of stratigraphy.

== Career ==
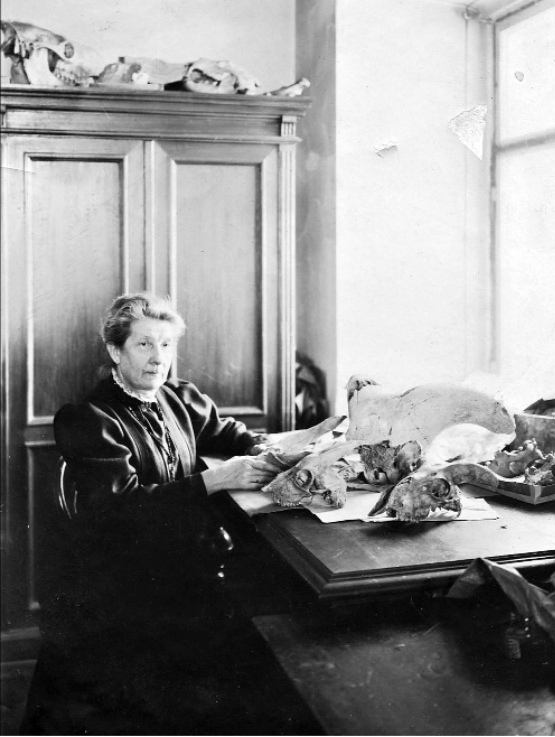
In 1910 in the geology collections at the Imperial Moscow University

Initially, Pavlova studied the geological collections of the museum at Moscow State University, working without payment. She moved from submitting papers on Early Cretaceous ammonites from the Volga region, to pursuing research into Tertiary mammals. She studied their evolution, using data collected from Russia, Western Europe, and America. Her work reached and was well-recognized by an international audience. She studied ungulate mammals and proboscidians. By 1894 she was working on Russian mastodons.

In 1897, Pavlova was one of only two women invited to join the organizing committee for and to make presentations at the first International Geological Congress (IGC) that was held in St. Petersburg, Russia. She published Fossil Elephants in 1899. She would go on to describe separate groups of fossil mammals, and to describe complete faunas. For instance, the most completely-known species of the genus Paraceratherium she named in 1922, P. transouralicum, is the basis upon which most reconstructions of paraceratheres are made, though this species is considered by some researchers to be a junior synonym of P. asiaticum which was named earlier in 1918.

Pavlova was made a professor at Moscow State University in 1919.

Her extensive work in describing and tracing the genetic lines of many large mammals was derived from the study of collections that would be included in a palaeontological museum at Moscow State University that she was instrumental in founding. In 1926, the museum was named jointly for her and her husband, in recognition of their research. He died in 1929.

She went on her last geological expedition in 1931, to the city of Khvalynsk, located in Russia near the Volga River.

At the age of 84, Maria Vasilievna Pavlova died on December 23, 1938, in Moscow. She was buried in the Novodevichiy cemetery.

== Professional memberships ==
Pavlova was a member of many Russian scientific organizations, including:

- Moscow Society of Naturalists
- Honorary Member of the Mineralogical Society (Honorary member)
- Moscow Society of Amateurs of Natural Sciences, Anthropology and Ethnography
- Russian Geographical Society
- Uralian Society of Amateurs of Natural Sciences
- Novorossiysk Society of Naturalists
- Russian Mining Society
- The Academy of Sciences of the USSR (honorary member)
