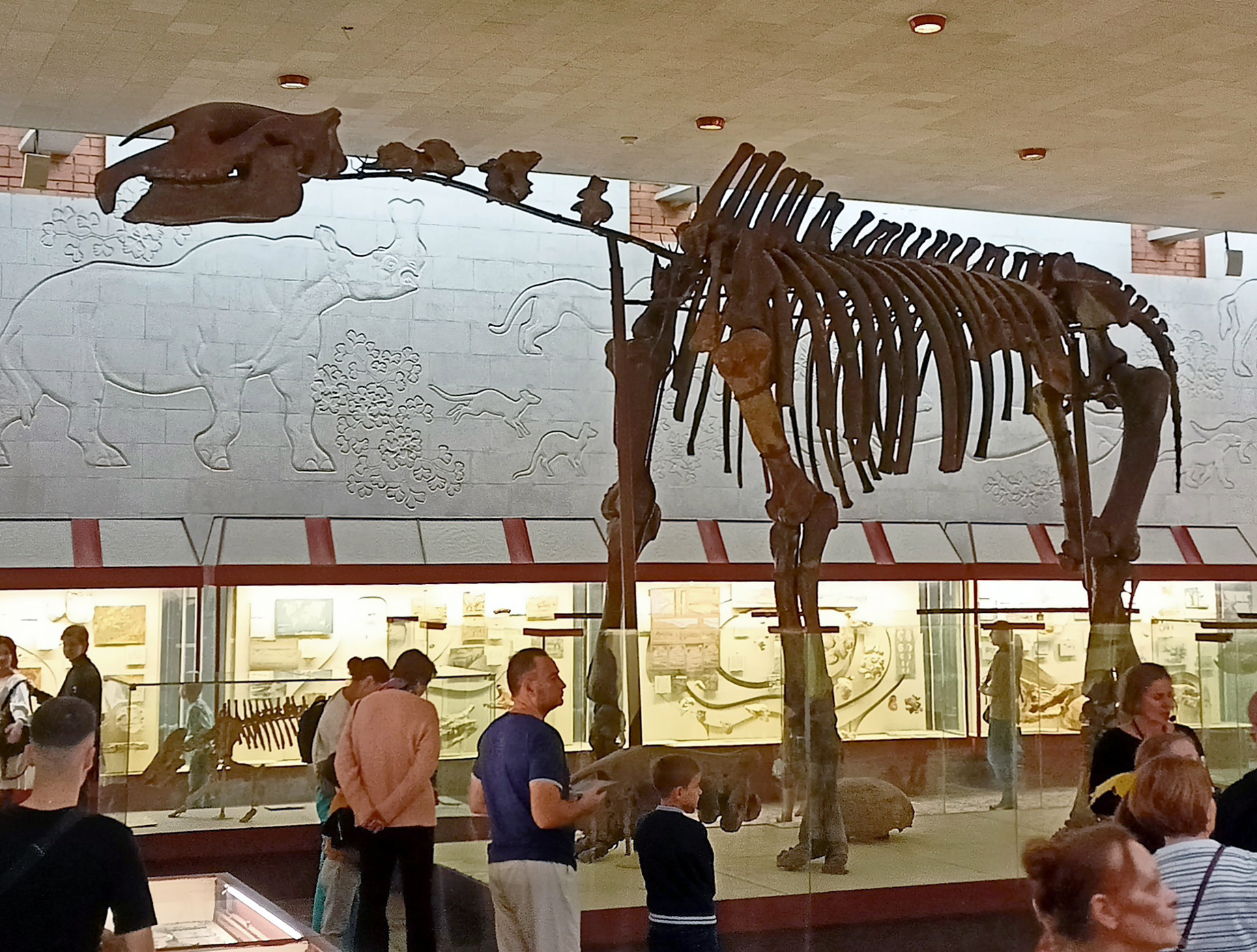
- Mounted P. transouralicum skeleton, Moscow Paleontological Museum; this is the most completely known skeleton, but the skull is a cast of a specimen at the American Museum of Natural History

Scientific classification
- Kingdom: Animalia
- Phylum: Chordata
- Class: Mammalia
- Order: Perissodactyla
- Family: †Paraceratheriidae
- Genus: †Paraceratherium; Forster-Cooper, 1911

Type species
- †Aceratherium bugtiense (original combination) Pilgrim, 1908

Species
- †P. bugtiense (Pilgrim, 1908); †P. transouralicum (Pavlova, 1922); †P. huangheense Li et al., 2017; †P. linxiaense Deng et al., 2021

Synonyms
- Genus synonymy: Baluchitherium Forster-Cooper, 1913; Indricotherium Borissiak, 1916; Pristinotherium Birkjukov, 1953; ?Benaratherium Gabunia, 1955; Species synonymy: P. bugtiense: Aceratherium bugtiense Pilgrim, 1908; Thaumastotherium osborni Forster-Cooper, 1913 (preoccupied); Baluchitherium osborni (Forster-Cooper, 1913); Metamynodon bugtiensis Forster-Cooper, 1922; Paraceratherium zhajremensis Bayshashov, 1988; P. transouralicum: Indricotherium transouralicum Pavlova, 1922; Baluchitherium grangeri Osborn, 1923; Indricotherium asiaticum Borissiak, 1923; Indricotherium minus Borissiak, 1923; Indricotherium grangeri (Osborn, 1923); Pristinotherium brevicervicale Birjukov, 1953; Dubious names: Benaratherium callistrati Gabunia, 1955

= Paraceratherium =

Paraceratherium Temporal range: Early-Late Oligocene – 34–23 Ma

Extinct genus of hornless rhinocerotoids from Eurasia

Paraceratherium is an extinct genus of hornless rhinocerotoids belonging to the family Paraceratheriidae. It is one of the largest terrestrial mammals that has ever existed and lived from the Early to Late Oligocene epoch (34–23 million years ago). The first fossils were discovered in what is now Pakistan, and remains have been found across Eurasia between China and the Balkans. Paraceratherium means "near the hornless beast", in reference to Aceratherium, the genus in which the type species P. bugtiense was originally placed.

The exact size of Paraceratherium is unknown because of the incompleteness of the fossils. The shoulder height was about 4.8 metres (15.7 feet), and the length about 7.4 metres (24.3 feet). Its weight is estimated to have been about 15 to 20 tonnes (33,000 to 44,000 lb). The long neck supported a skull that was about 1.3 metres (4.3 ft) long. It had large, tusk-like incisors and a nasal incision that suggests it had a prehensile upper lip or proboscis (trunk). The legs were long and pillar-like. The lifestyle of Paraceratherium may have been similar to that of modern large mammals such as the elephants and extant rhinoceroses. Because of its size, it would have had few predators and a long gestation period. It was a browser, eating mainly leaves, soft plants and shrubs. It lived in habitats ranging from arid deserts with a few scattered trees to subtropical forests. The reasons for the animal's extinction are unknown, but various factors have been proposed.

The taxonomy of the genus and the species within has a long and complicated history. Other genera of Oligocene indricotheres, such as Baluchitherium, Indricotherium and Pristinotherium, have been named, but no complete specimens exist, making comparison and classification difficult. Most modern scientists consider these genera to be junior synonyms of Paraceratherium, and it is thought to contain the species P. bugtiense, P. transouralicum, P. huangheense and P. linxiaense. The most completely known species is P. transouralicum, so most reconstructions of the genus are based on it. Differences between P. bugtiense and P. transouralicum may be due to sexual dimorphism, which would make them the same species.

== Taxonomy ==
The taxonomic history of Paraceratherium is complex due to the fragmentary nature of the known fossils and because Western, Soviet and Chinese scientists worked in isolation from each other for much of the 20th century and published research mainly in their respective languages. Scientists from different parts of the world tried to compare their finds to get a more complete picture of these animals, but were hindered by politics and wars. The opposing taxonomic tendencies of "lumping and splitting" have also contributed to the problem. Inaccurate geological dating previously led scientists to believe various geological formations that are now known to be contemporaneous were of different ages. Many genera were named on the basis of subtle differences in molar tooth characteristics—features that vary within populations of other rhinoceros taxa—and are therefore not accepted by most scientists for distinguishing species.

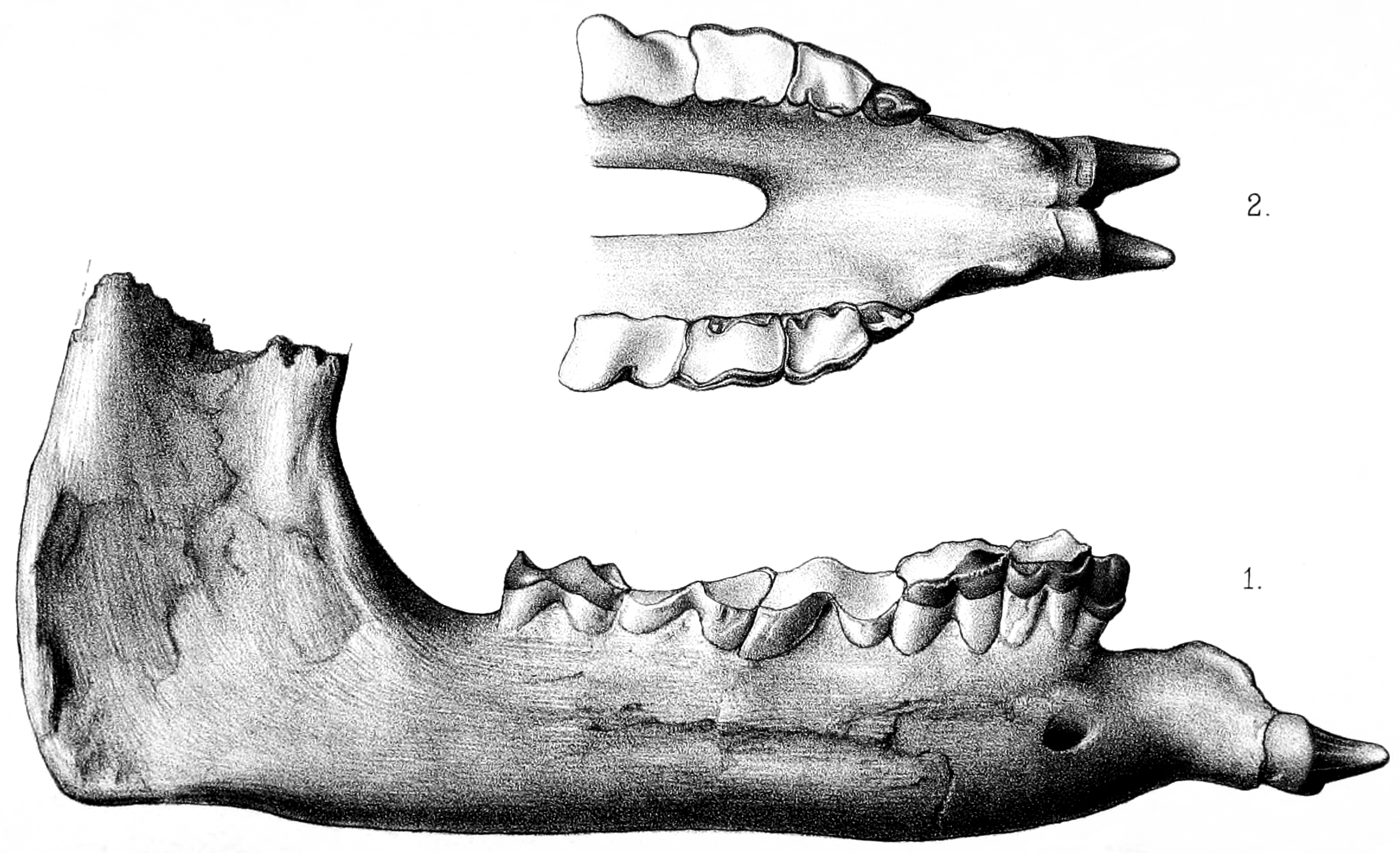
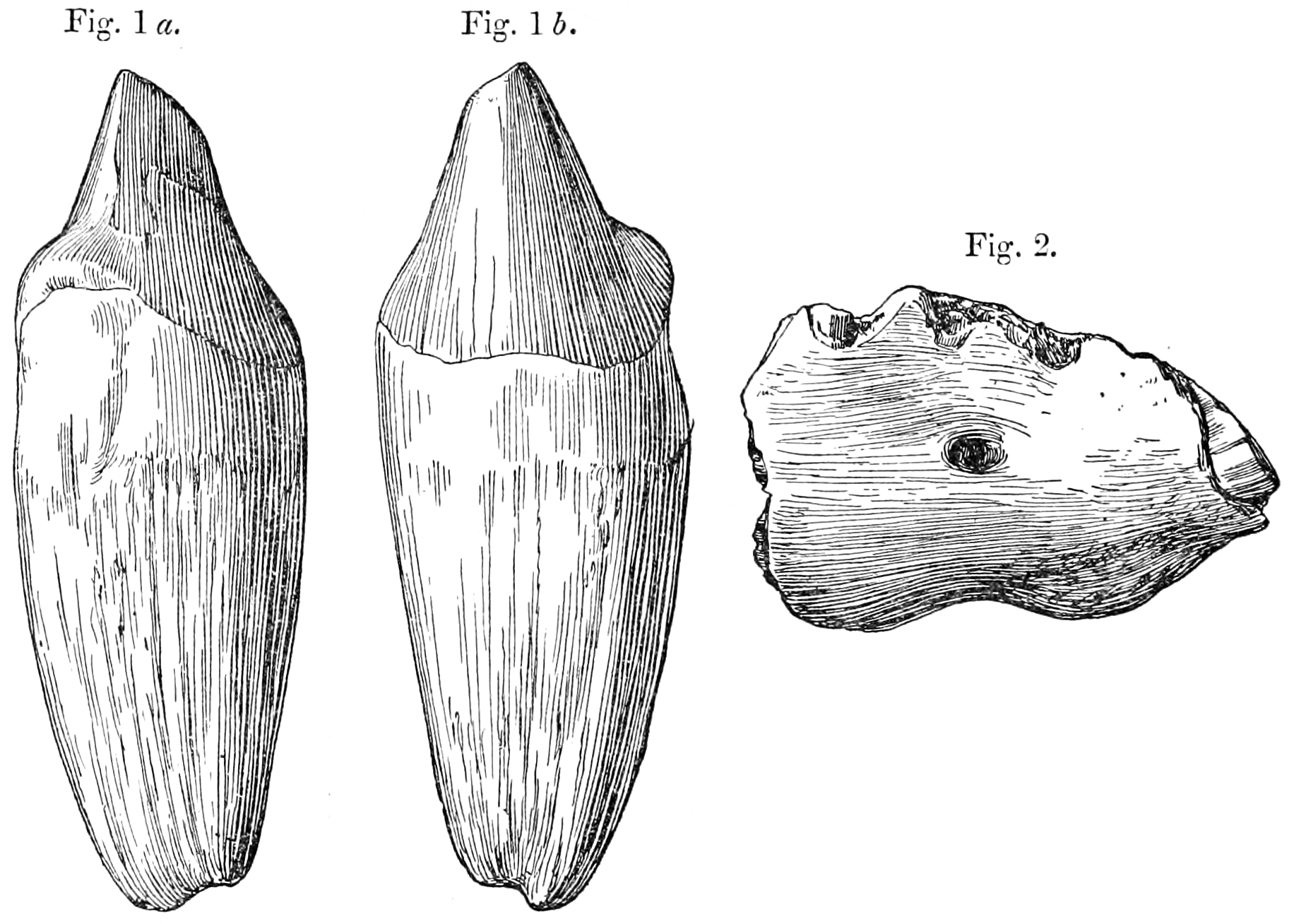
1911 illustrations of the down-turned lower jaw of P. bugtiense, which was the basis for its separation from the genus Aceratherium (left), and an incisor and part of a mandible (right)

Early discoveries of indricotheres were made through various colonial links to Asia. The first known indricothere fossils were collected from Balochistan (in modern-day Pakistan) in 1846 by a soldier named Vickary, but these fragments were unidentifiable at the time. The first fossils now recognised as Paraceratherium were discovered by the British geologist Guy Ellcock Pilgrim in Balochistan in 1907–1908. His material consisted of an upper jaw, lower teeth and the back of a jaw. The fossils were collected in the Chitarwata Formation of Dera Bugti, where Pilgrim had previously been exploring. In 1908, he used the fossils as basis for a new species of the extinct rhinoceros genus Aceratherium; A. bugtiense. Aceratherium was by then a wastebasket taxon; it included several unrelated species of hornless rhinoceros, many of which have since been moved to other genera. Fossil incisors that Pilgrim had previously assigned to the unrelated genus Bugtitherium were later shown to belong to the new species.

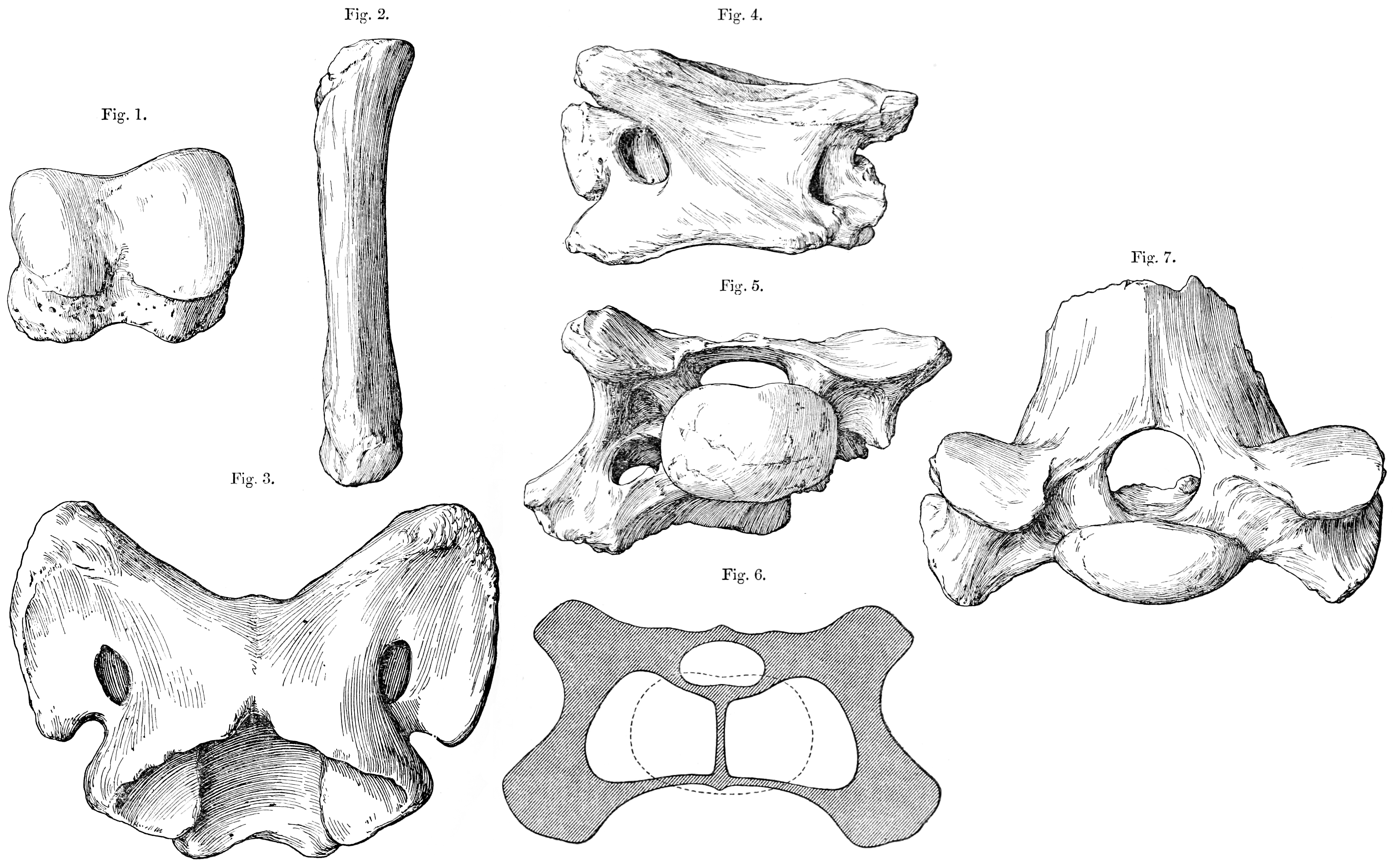
Fossils named Thaumastotherium and Baluchitherium osborni in 1913, now junior synonyms of P. bugtiense

In 1910, more partial fossils were discovered in Dera Bugti during an expedition by the British palaeontologist Clive Forster-Cooper. Based on these remains, Forster-Cooper moved A. bugtiense to the new genus Paraceratherium, meaning "near the hornless beast", in reference to Aceratherium. His rationale for this reclassification was the species' distinctly down-turned lower tusks. In 1913, Forster-Cooper named a new genus and species, Thaumastotherium ("wonderful beast") osborni, based on larger fossils from the same excavations (some of which he had earlier suggested to belong to male P. bugtiense), but he renamed the genus Baluchitherium later that year because the former name was preoccupied, as it had already been used for a hemipteran insect. The fossils of Baluchitherium were so fragmentary that Forster-Cooper was only able to identify it as a kind of odd-toed ungulate, but he mentioned the possibility of confusion with Paraceratherium. The American palaeontologist Henry Fairfield Osborn, after which B. osborni was named, suggested it may have been a titanothere.

A Russian Academy of Sciences expedition later found fossils in the Aral Formation near the Aral Sea in Kazakhstan; it was the most complete indricothere skeleton known, but it lacked the skull. It is mounted in the Moscow Paleontological Museum. In 1916, based on these remains, Aleksei Alekseeivich Borissiak erected the genus Indricotherium named for a mythological monster, the "Indrik beast". He did not assign a species name, I. asiaticum, until 1923, but the Russian palaeontologist Maria Pavlova had already named it I. transouralicum in 1922. Also in 1923, Borissiak created the subfamily Indricotheriinae to include the various related forms known by then.

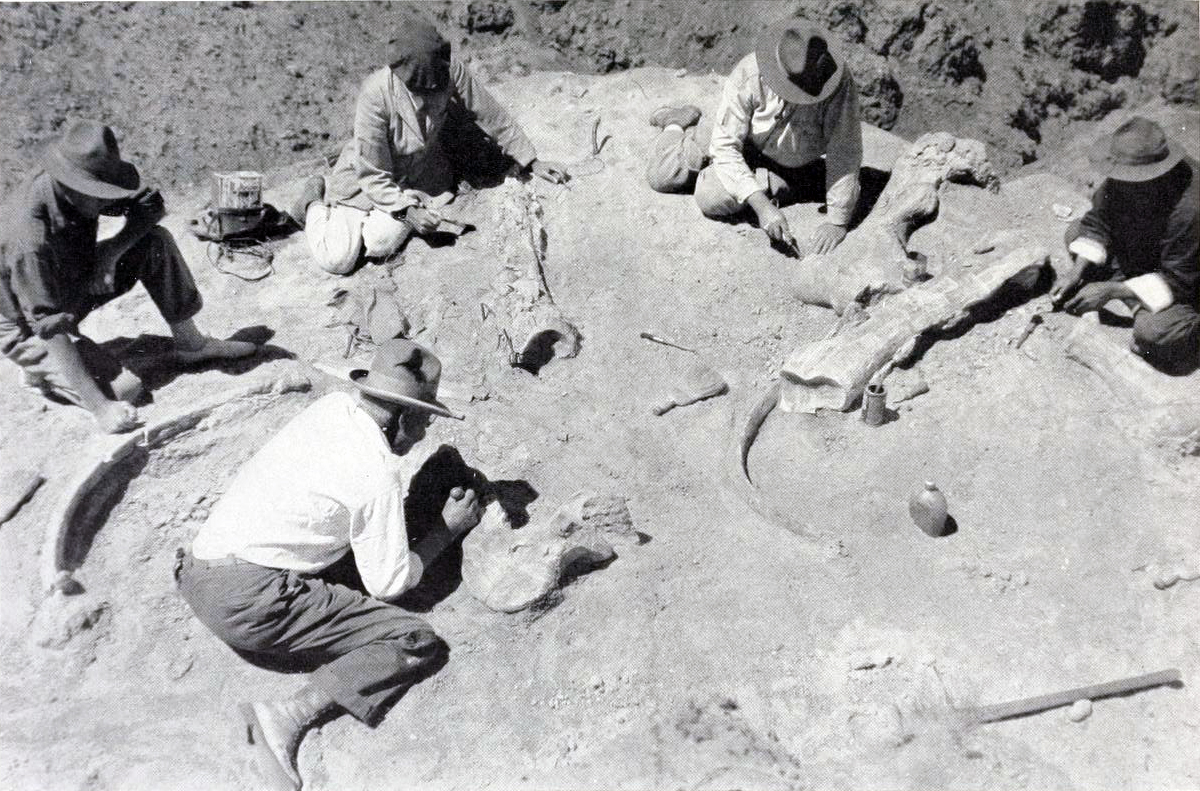
1928 excavation in Mongolia of a specimen then considered Baluchitherium

In 1922, the American explorer Roy Chapman Andrews led a well-documented expedition to China and Mongolia sponsored by the American Museum of Natural History. Various indricothere remains were found in formations of the Mongolian Gobi Desert, including the legs of a specimen standing in an upright position, indicating that it had died while trapped in quicksand, as well as a very complete skull. These remains became the basis of Baluchitherium grangeri, named by Osborn in 1923.

In 2017, a new species, P. huangheense, was named by the Chinese palaeontologist Yong-Xiang Li and colleagues based on jaw elements from the Hanjiajing Formation in the Gansu Province of China; the name refers to the nearby Huanghe River. In 2021, the Chinese palaeontologist Tao Deng and colleague described the new species P. linxiaense, based on a complete skull with an associated mandible and an atlas-axis complex followed by two thoracic vertebrae of another individual, all the fossils coming from the Jiaozigou Formation of the Linxia Basin (to which the name refers) of northwestern China. A multitude of other species and genus names—mostly based on differences in size, snout shape and front tooth arrangement—have been coined for various indricothere remains. Fossils attributable to Paraceratherium continue to be discovered across Eurasia, but the political situation in Pakistan had become too unstable for further excavations to occur there.

=== Species and synonyms ===
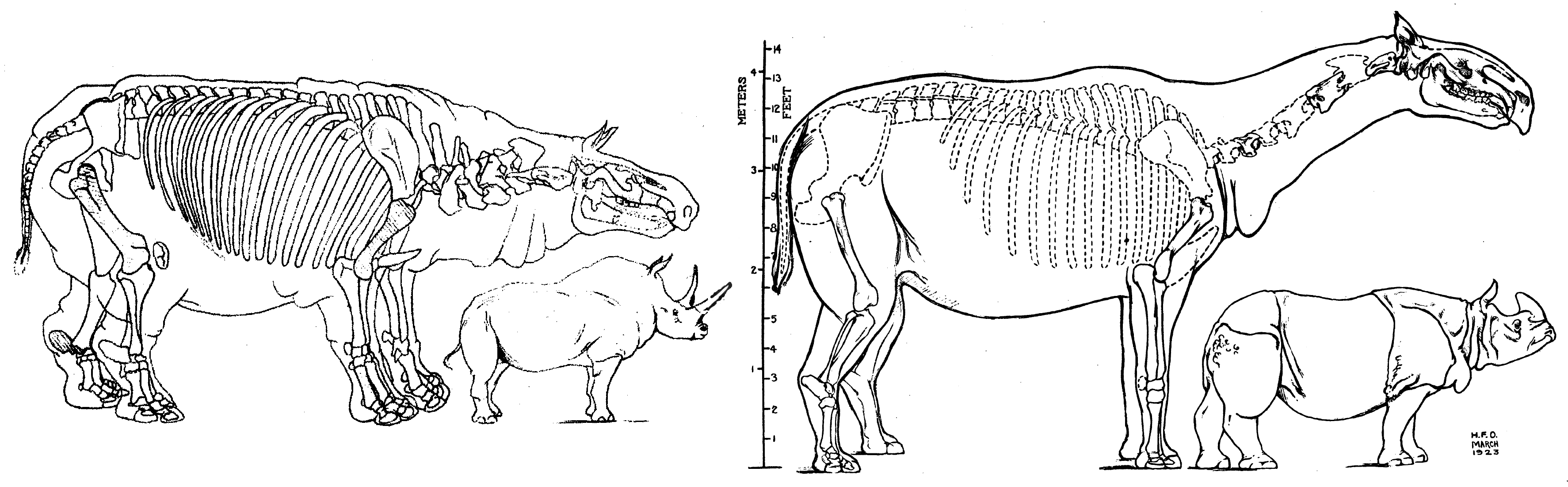
1923 skeletal reconstructions of B. grangeri (now P. transouralicum), in rhinoceros-like and slender versions

In 1922 Forster-Cooper named the new species Metamynodon bugtiensis based on a palate and other fragments from Dera Bugti, thought to belong to a giant member of that genus. These fossils are now thought to have belonged to an aberrant Paraceratherium bugtiense specimen that lacked the M3 molar. Forster-Cooper stated in 1932 that the generic rank of Indricotherium was fairly well established and while there were similarities in features of the jaws and teeth of Baluchitherium and Paraceratherium, there were also considerable differences, leading him to conclude keeping them separate was permissible as a working hypothesis.

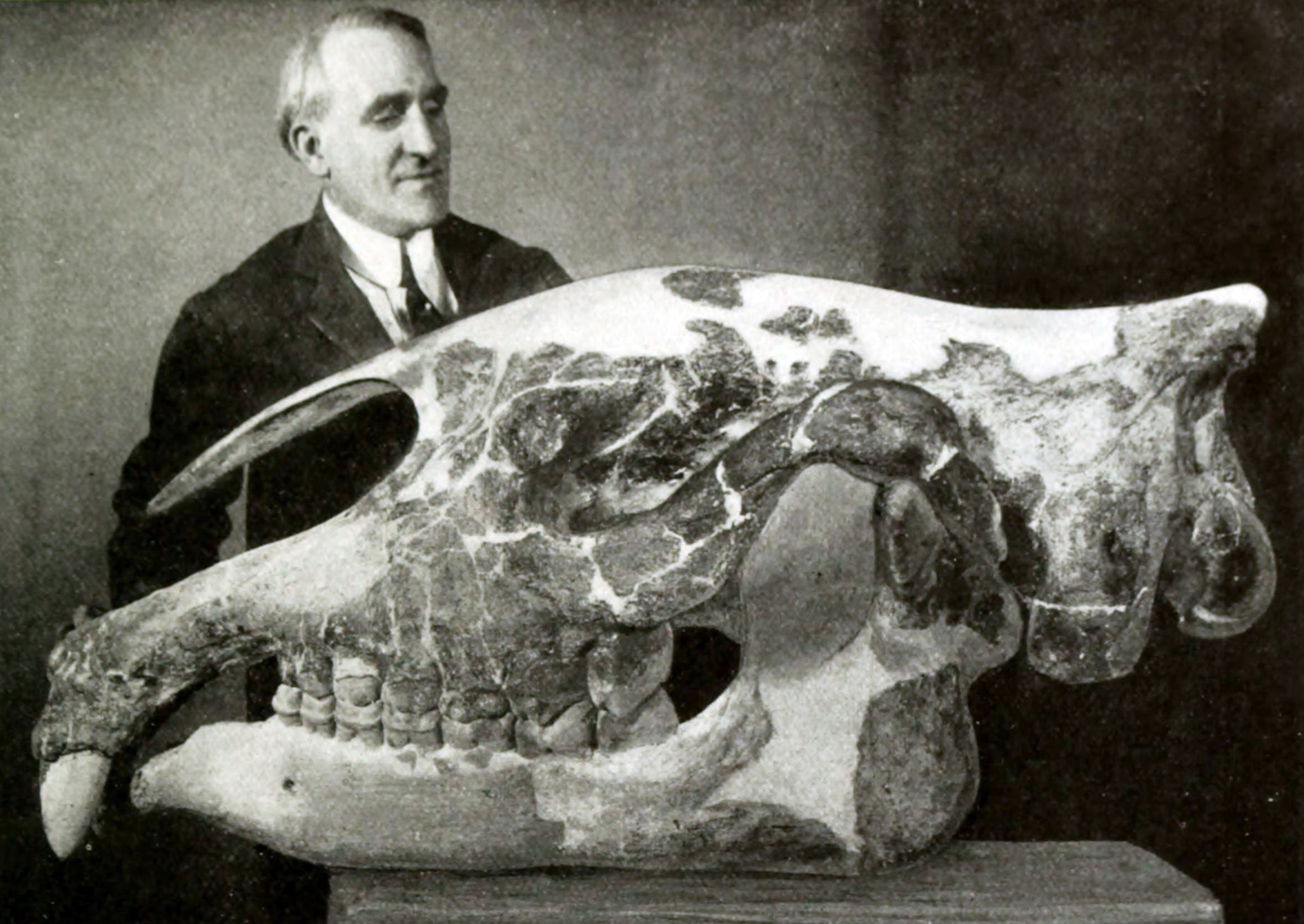
Preparator Otto Falkenbach with P. transouralicum skull (AMNH 18650), originally assigned to B. grangeri, 1923

In 1936, the American palaeontologists Walter Granger and William K. Gregory proposed that Forster-Cooper's Baluchitherium osborni was likely a junior synonym (an invalid name for the same taxon) of Paraceratherium bugtiense, because these specimens were collected at the same locality and were possibly part of the same morphologically variable species. They conceded there were minor differences that could be specific, and nonetheless opted to continue using the name Baluchitherium grangeri for the Mongolian material. American palaeontologist Donald Prothero speculated that Granger and Gregory hesitated to sink Baluchitherium entirely due to the politics at the American Museum; their boss, Osborn, had heavily publicised the genus and one of its species was named after him. The genus name Baluchitherium remained popular in various media for decades because of the publicity surrounding B. grangeri.

In 1989, the American palaeontologists Spencer G. Lucas and Jay C. Sobus published a revision of indricothere taxa, which was subsequently followed by western scientists. They concluded that Paraceratherium, as the oldest name, was the only valid indricothere genus from the Oligocene, and contained four valid species, P. bugtiense, P. transouralicum (originally in Indricotherium), P. prohorovi (originally in Aralotherium) and P. orgosensis (originally in Dzungariotherium). They considered most other names to be junior synonyms of those taxa, or as dubious names, based on remains too fragmentary to identify properly. By analysing alleged differences between named genera and species, Lucas and Sobus found that these most likely represented variation within populations, and that most features were indistinguishable between specimens, as had been pointed out in the 1930s. The fact that the single skull assigned to P. transouralicum or Indricotherium was domed, while others were flat at the top was attributed to sexual dimorphism; it is possible that P. bugtiense fossils represent the female, while P. transouralicum represents the male of the same species.

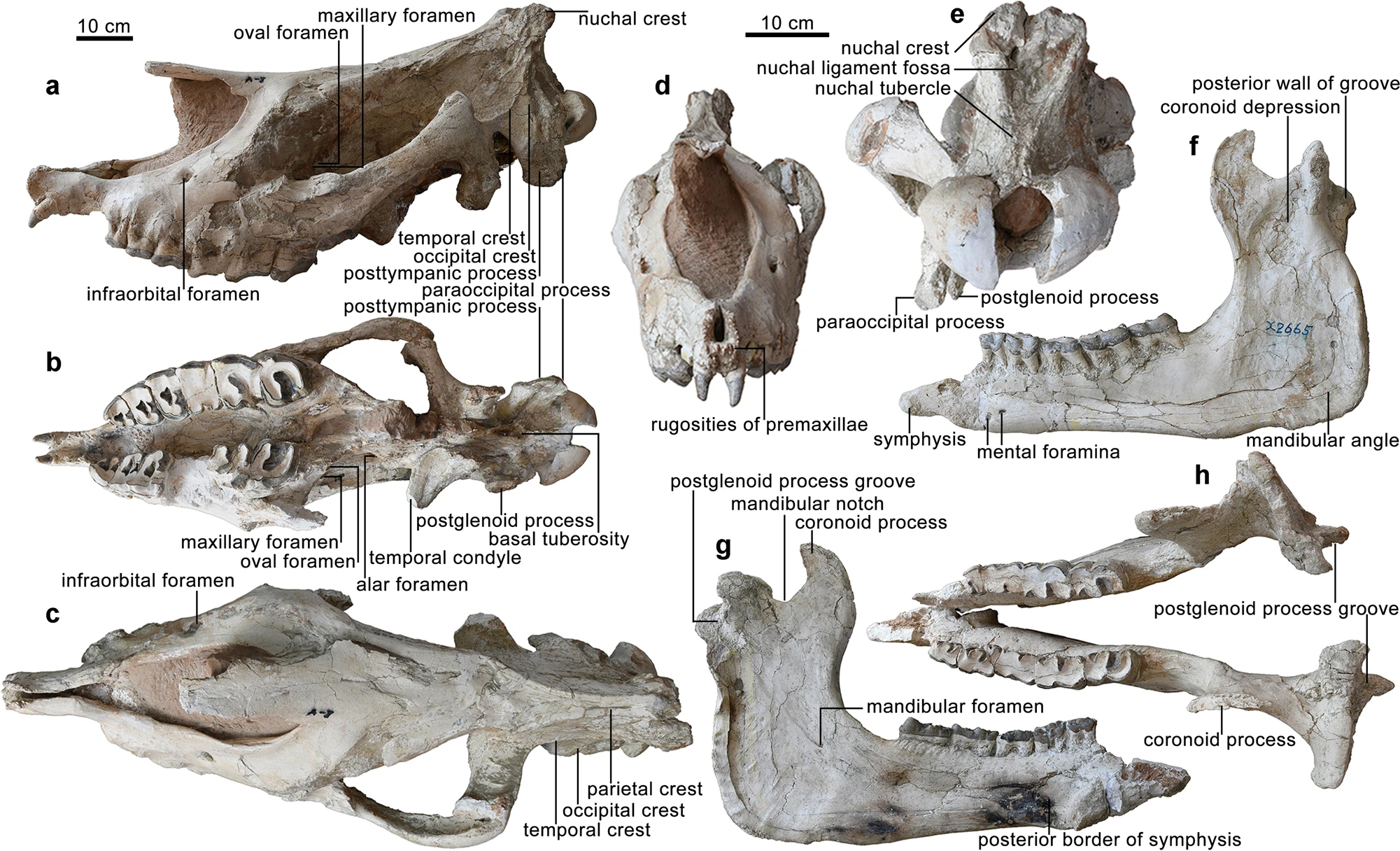
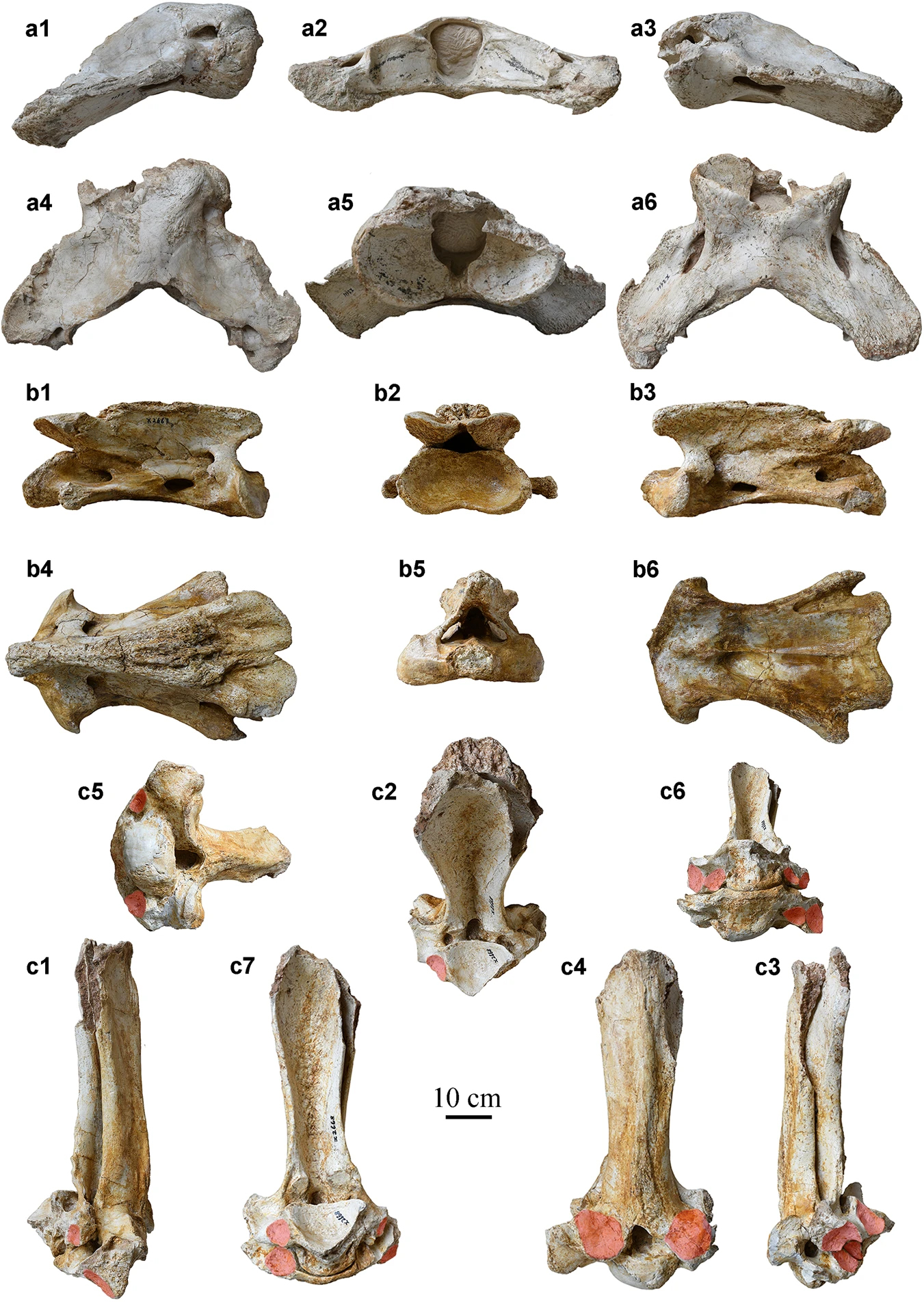
Skull (left) and vertebrae (right) of P. linxiaense

According to Lucas and Sobus, the type species P. bugtiense from the late Oligocene of Pakistan included junior synonyms such as B. osborni and P. zhajremensis. P. transouralicum from the late Oligocene of Kazakhstan, Mongolia and northern China included B. grangeri and I. minus. By this scheme, P. orgosensis from the middle and late Oligocene of northwest China included D. turfanensis and P. lipidus. In 2013, Donald Prothero suggested that P. orgosensis may be distinct enough to warrant its original genus name Dzungariotherium, though its exact position requires evaluation. P. prohorovi from the late Oligocene of Kazakhstan may be too incomplete for its position to be resolved in relation to the other species; the same applies to proposed species such as I. intermedium and P. tienshanensis, as well as the Georgian genus Benaratherium. Though the genus name Indricotherium is now a junior synonym of Paraceratherium, the subfamily name Indricotheriinae is still in use because genus name synonymy does not affect the names of higher level taxa that are derived from these. Members of the subfamily are therefore still commonly referred to as indricotheres.

In contrast to the revision by Lucas and Sobus, a 2003 paper by Chinese palaeontologist Jie Ye and colleagues suggested that Indricotherium and Dzungariotherium were valid genera, and that P. prohorovi did not belong in Paraceratherium. They also recognised the validity of species such as P. lipidus, P. tienshanensis and P. sui. A 2004 paper by Deng and colleagues also recognised three distinct genera. The Chinese palaeontologists Qiu Zhanxiang and Wang Ban Yue suggested in 2007 that the name P. asiaticum should be used instead of P. transouralicum. Some western writers have similarly used names otherwise considered invalid since the 1989 revision, but without providing detailed analysis and justification. Deng and colleagues recognised six Paraceratherium species in 2021, including some that had previously been declared synonyms, P. grangeri, P. asiaticum and P. lepidum, while keeping Indricotherium and Baluchitherium as synonyms of the genus.

=== Evolution ===
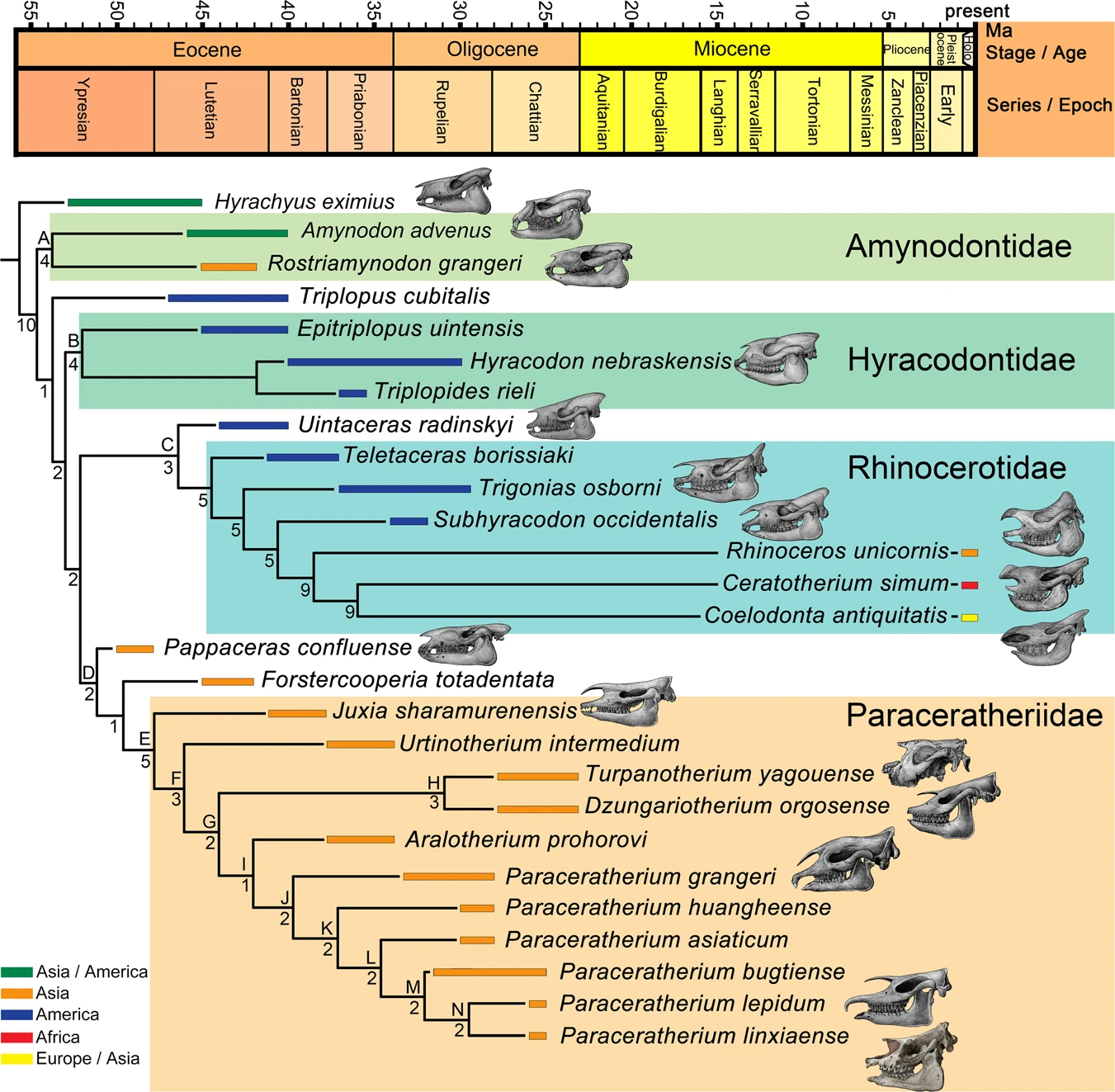
Phylogenetic relationships of Paraceratherium with other rhinos, according to Tao Deng and colleagues, 2021

The superfamily Rhinocerotoidea, which includes modern rhinoceroses, can be traced back to the early Eocene—about 50 million years ago—with early precursors such as Hyrachyus. Rhinocerotoidea contains three families; Amynodontidae, Rhinocerotidae ("true rhinoceroses") and Hyracodontidae. The diversity within the rhinocerotoid group was much larger in prehistoric times; they ranged from dog-sized to the size of Paraceratherium. There were long-legged, cursorial forms adapted for running and squat, semi aquatic forms. Most species did not have horns. Rhinoceros fossils are identified as such mainly by characteristics of their teeth, which is the part of the animals most likely to be preserved. The upper molars of most rhinoceroses have a pi-shaped (π) pattern on the crown, and each lower molar has paired L-shapes. Various skull features are also used for identification of fossil rhinoceroses.

The subfamily Indricotheriinae, to which Paraceratherium belongs, was first classified as part of the family Hyracodontidae by the American palaeontologist Leonard B. Radinsky in 1966. Previously, they had been regarded as a subfamily within Rhinocerotidea, or even a full family, Indricotheriidae. In a 1999 cladistic study of tapiromorphs, the American palaeontologist Luke Holbrook found indricotheres to be outside the hyracodontid clade, and wrote that they may not be a monophyletic (natural) grouping. Radinsky's scheme is the prevalent hypothesis today. The hyracodont family contains long-legged members adapted to running, such as Hyracodon, and were distinguished by incisor characteristics. Indricotheres are distinguished from other hyracodonts by their larger size and the derived structure of their snouts, incisors and canines. The earliest known indricothere is the dog-sized Forstercooperia from the middle and late Eocene of western North America and Asia. The cow-sized Juxia is known from the middle Eocene; by the late Eocene the genus Urtinotherium of Asia had almost reached the size of Paraceratherium. Paraceratherium itself lived in Eurasia during the Oligocene period, 23 to 34 million years ago. The genus is distinguished from other indricotheres by its large size, nasal incision that would have supported a muscular snout, and its down-turned premaxillae. It had also lost the second and third lower incisors, lower canines, and lower first premolars.

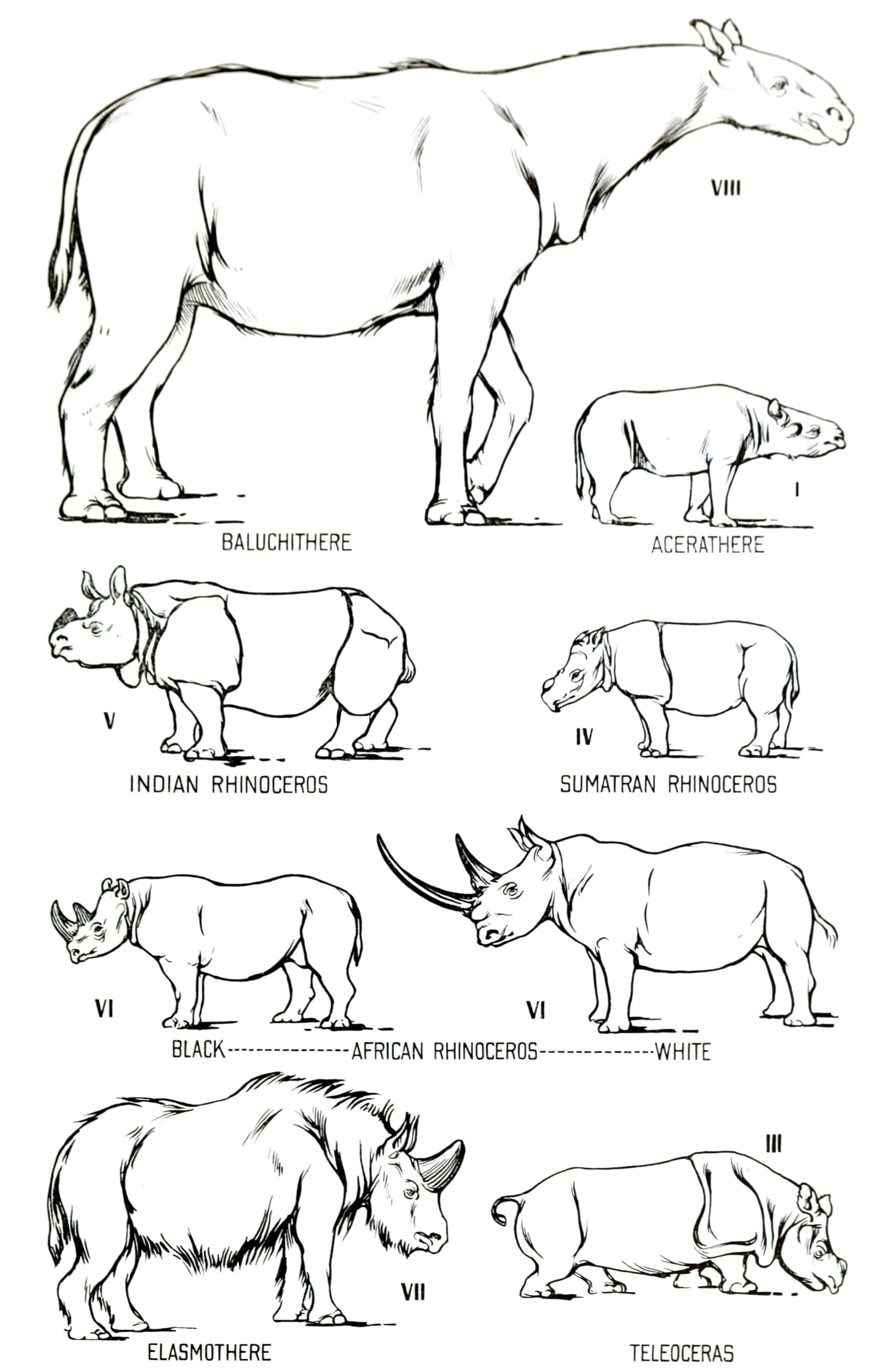
1923 life restoration of Paraceratherium alongside other extinct and extant rhinos

The cladogram below follows the 1989 analysis of Indricotheriinae by Lucas and Sobus, and shows the closest relatives of Paraceratherium:

- Hyracodontidae
  - Triplopodinae
  - Indricotheriinae
    - Forstercooperia
    - - Juxia
      - - Urtinotherium
        - Paraceratherium

Lucas and colleagues had reached similar conclusions in a previous 1981 analysis of Forstercooperia, wherein they still retained Paraceratherium and Indricotherium as separate genera. In 2016, the Chinese researchers Haibing Wang and colleagues used the name Paraceratheriidae for the family and Paraceratheriine for the subfamily, and placed them outside of Hyracodontidae. Deng and colleagues confirmed previous studies with their 2021 analysis, suggesting that Juxia evolved from a clade consisting of Forstercooperia and Pappaceras 40 million years ago, with the resulting stock evolving into Urtinotherium in the late Eocene and Paraceratherium in the Oligocene. These researchers did not find Hyracodontidae to form a natural group, and found Paraceratheriidae to be closer to Rhinocerotidae, unlike previous studies.

== Description ==
Size comparison of extremely large, world-record size individuals P. transouralicum, compared to specimens of the northern giraffe, the extinct elephant Palaeoloxodon recki, and the African bush elephant compared to humans

Paraceratherium is one of the largest known land mammals that have ever existed, but its precise size is unclear because of the lack of complete specimens. Its total body length was estimated as 8.22 m (27.0 ft) from front to back by Granger and Gregory in 1936, and 7.4 m (24.3 ft) by the palaeontologist Vera Gromova in 1959, but the former estimate is now considered exaggerated. The weight of Paraceratherium is similar to that estimated for some extinct proboscideans like the elephant Palaeoloxodon namadicus, the mastodon "Mammut" borsoni, or the steppe mammoth (Mammuthus trogontherii). Despite its roughly equivalent mass, Paraceratherium might have been taller than any proboscidean. Its shoulder height was estimated as 5.41 m (17.7 ft) at the shoulders by Granger and Gregory, but was later revised to 4.8 m (15.7 ft) by the palaeontologist Gregory S. Paul in 1997. The neck was estimated at 2 to 2.5 m (6.6 to 8.2 ft) long by the palaeontologists Michael P. Taylor and Mathew J. Wedel in 2013.

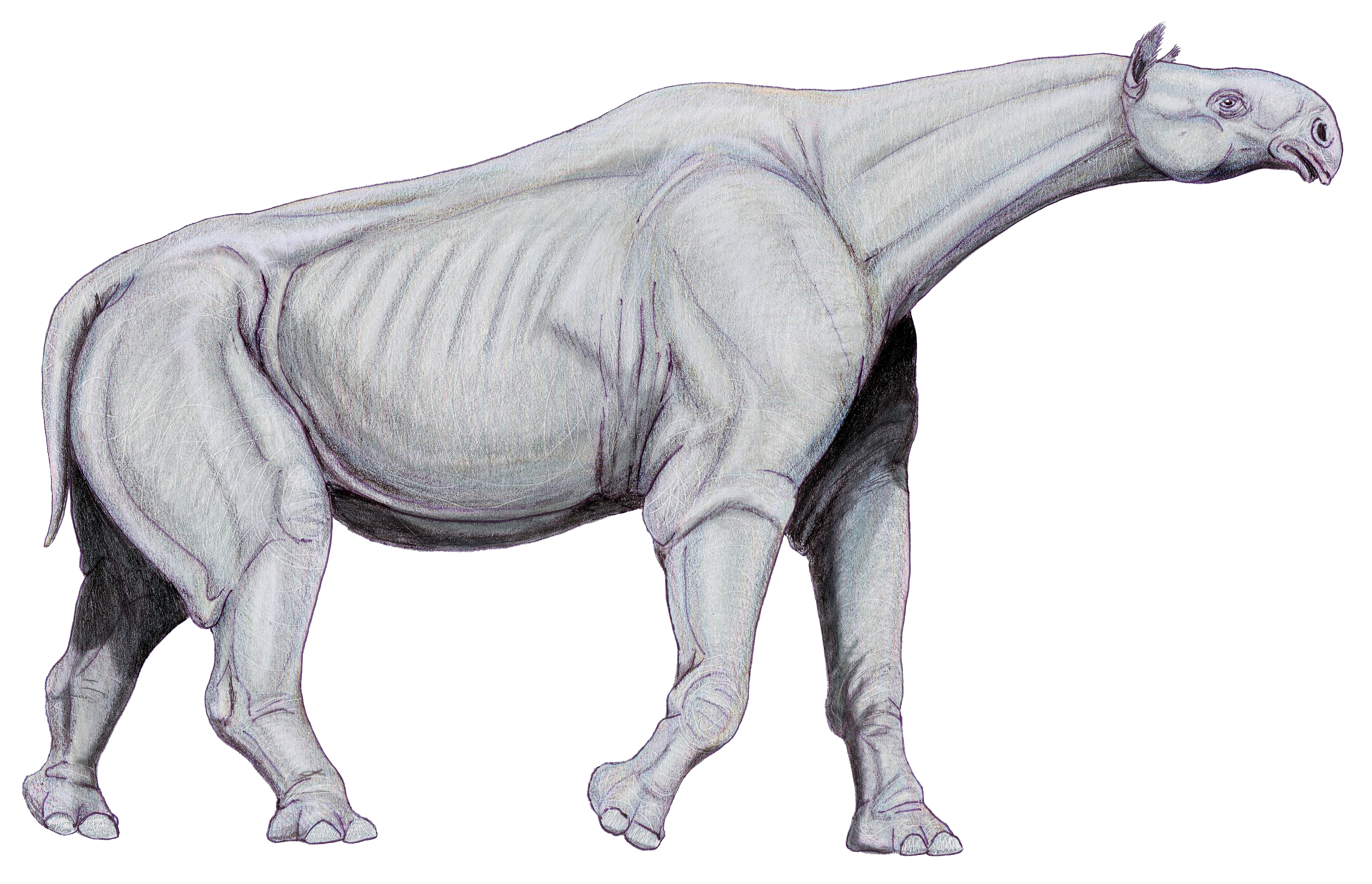
Life restoration of P. transouralicum

Early estimates of 30 tonnes (66,000 lb) are now considered exaggerated; it may have been in the range of 15 to 20 tonnes (33,000 to 44,000 lb) at maximum, and as low as 11 tonnes (24,000 lb) on average. Calculations have mainly been based on fossils of P. transouralicum because this species is known from the most complete remains. Estimates have been based on skull, teeth and limb bone measurements, but the known bone elements are represented by individuals of different sizes, so all skeletal reconstructions are composite extrapolations, resulting in several weight ranges. The palaeontologist Asier Larramendi estimated in 2015 that the largest known remains of P. transouralicum, represented by two neck (cervical) vertebrae and a metacarpal bone from the hand, belonged to individuals with a shoulder height of 4.8 metres (16 ft) and a body mass of 17.1 tonnes (38,000 lb). A 2022 study by the palaeontologist Shije Li and colleagues estimated the mass of all Paraceratherium species alongside other paraceratheriids; based on limb bone length the species P. bugtiensis had an estimated body mass of 9.1 tonnes (20,000 lb), P. grangeri 14 tonnes (31,000 lb), P. linxiaense 11 tonnes (24,000 lb), P. asiaticum (used by them instead of P. transouralicum) 12 tonnes (26,000 lb), and P. lepidum 14.6 tonnes (32,000 lb), making it the largest species in the genus.

There are no indications of the colour and skin texture of the animal because no skin impressions or mummies are known. Most life restorations show the creature's skin as thick, folded, grey and hairless, based on modern rhinoceroses. Because hair retains body heat, modern large mammals such as elephants and rhinoceroses are largely hairless. Prothero has proposed that, contrary to most depictions, Paraceratherium had large elephant-like ears that it used for thermoregulation. The ears of elephants enlarge the body's surface area and are filled with blood vessels, making the dissipation of excess heat easier. According to Prothero, this would have been true for Paraceratherium, as indicated by the robust bones around the ear openings. The palaeontologists Pierre-Olivier Antoine and Darren Naish have expressed scepticism towards this idea.

Due to the fragmentary nature of known Paraceratherium fossils, the skeleton of the animal has been reconstructed in several different ways since its discovery. In 1923, Matthew supervised an artist to draw a reconstruction of the skeleton based on the even less complete P. transouralicum specimens known by then, using the proportions of a modern rhinoceros as a guide. The result was too squat and compact, and Osborn had a more slender version drawn later the same year. Some later life restorations have made the animal too slender, with little regard to the underlying skeleton. Gromova published a more complete skeletal reconstruction in 1959, based on the P. transouralicum skeleton from the Aral Formation, but this also lacked several neck vertebrae.

=== Skull ===
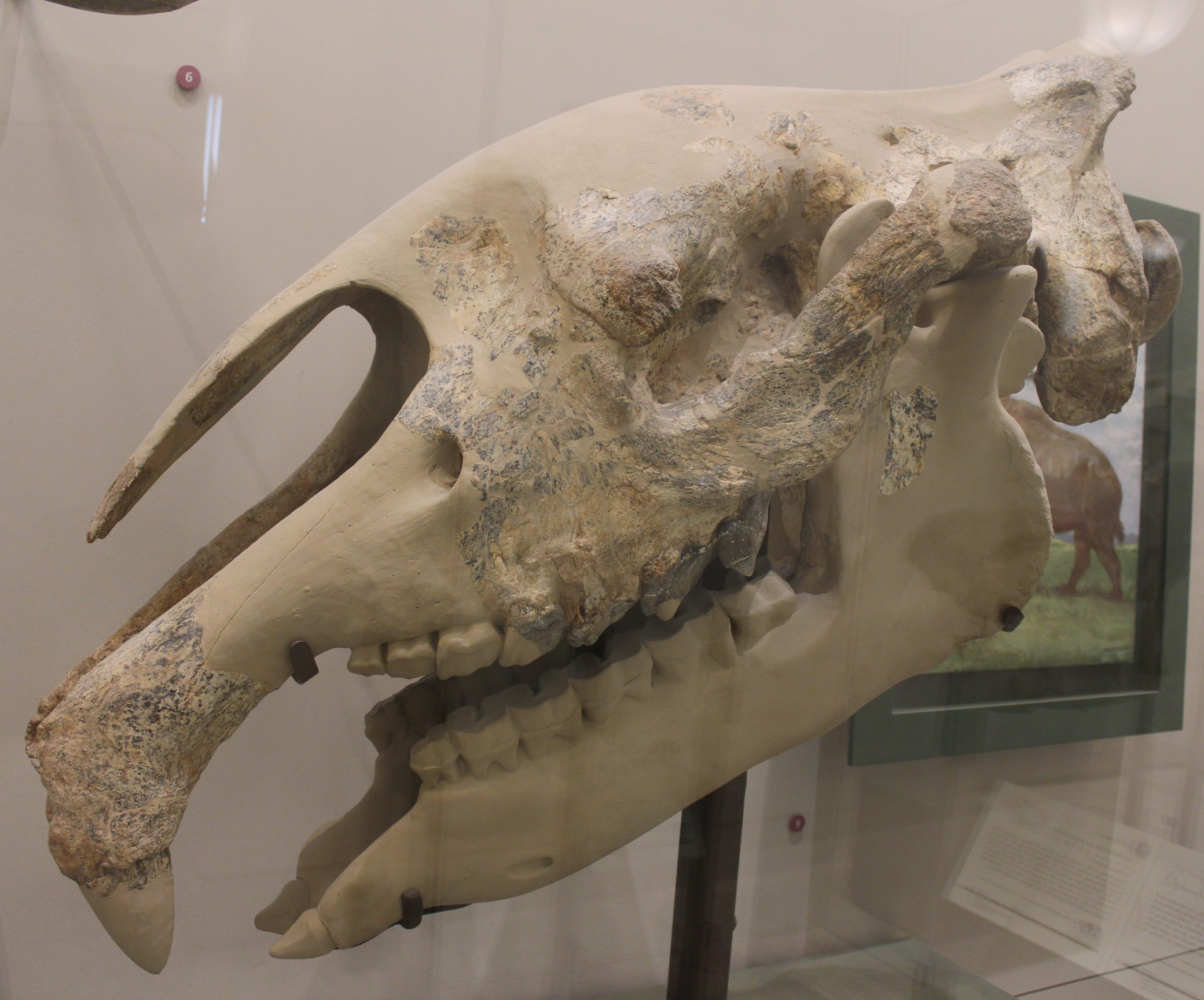
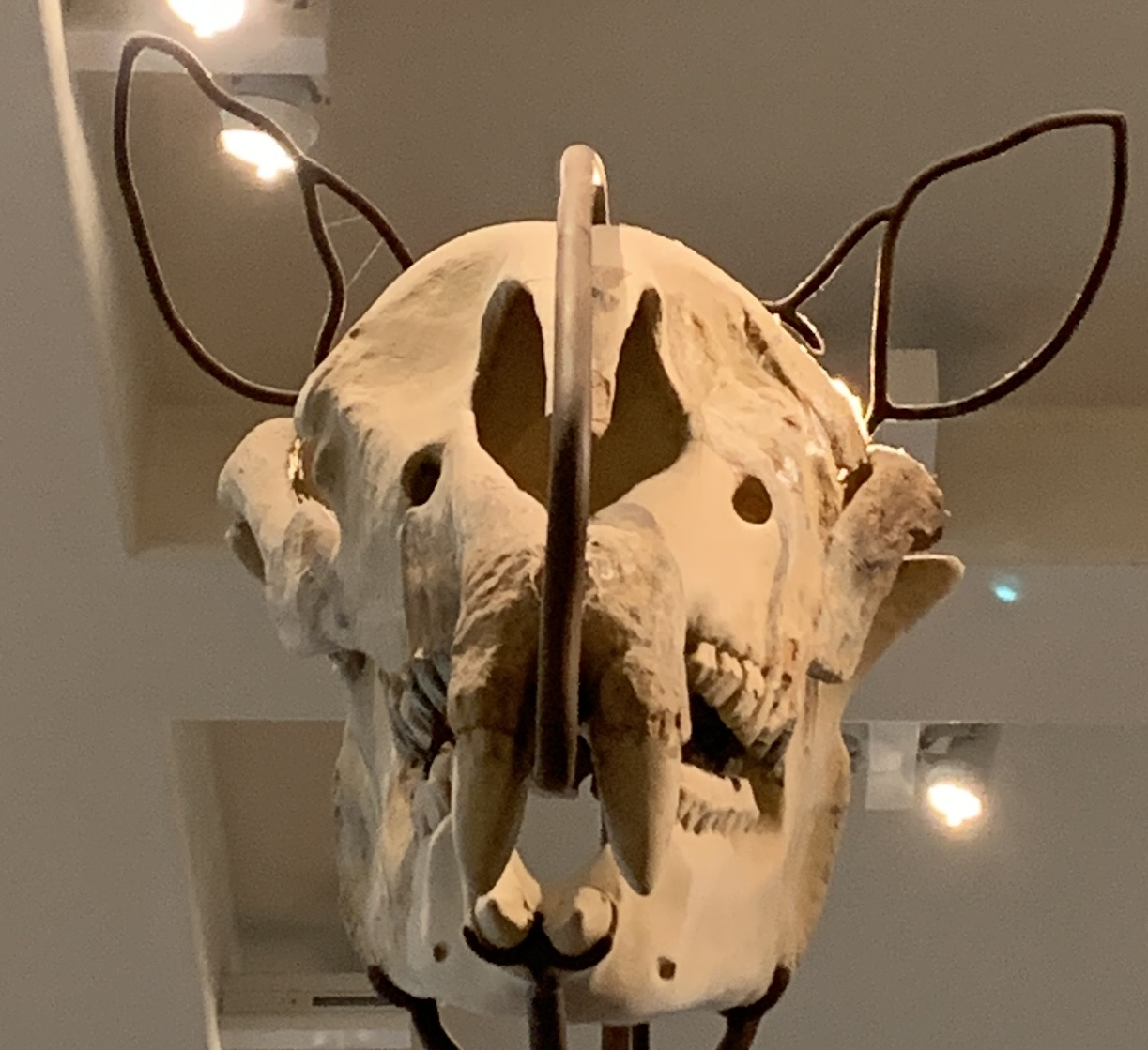
P. transouralicum skull AMNH 18650 in side view and cast in front view, showing the incisors.

The largest skulls of Paraceratherium are around 1.3 metres (4.3 ft) long, 33 to 38 centimetres (13 to 15 in) at the back of the skull, and 61 centimetres (24 in) wide across by the zygomatic arches. Paraceratherium had a long forehead, which was smooth and lacked the roughened area that serves as attachment point for the horns of other rhinoceroses. The bones above the nasal region are long and the nasal incision goes far into the skull. This indicates that Paraceratherium had a prehensile upper lip similar to that of the black rhinoceros and the Indian rhinoceros, or a short proboscis (trunk) as in tapirs. A distinguishing feature was that the nasal incision was retracted to the P2-P3 premolars.

The back of the skull was low and narrow, without the large lambdoid crests at the top and along the sagittal crest, which are otherwise found in horned and tusked animals that need strong muscles to push and fight. It also had a deep pit for the attachment of nuchal ligaments, which hold up the skull automatically. The occipital condyle was very wide and Paraceratherium appears to have had large, strong neck muscles, which allowed it to sweep its head strongly downwards while foraging from branches. The upper profile of the skull was arched, a distinguishing feature of the genus. One skull of P. transouralicum has a domed forehead, whereas others have flat foreheads, possibly because of sexual dimorphism. A brain endocast of P. transouralicum shows it was only 8 percent of the skull length, while the brain of the Indian rhinoceros is 17.7 percent of its skull length.

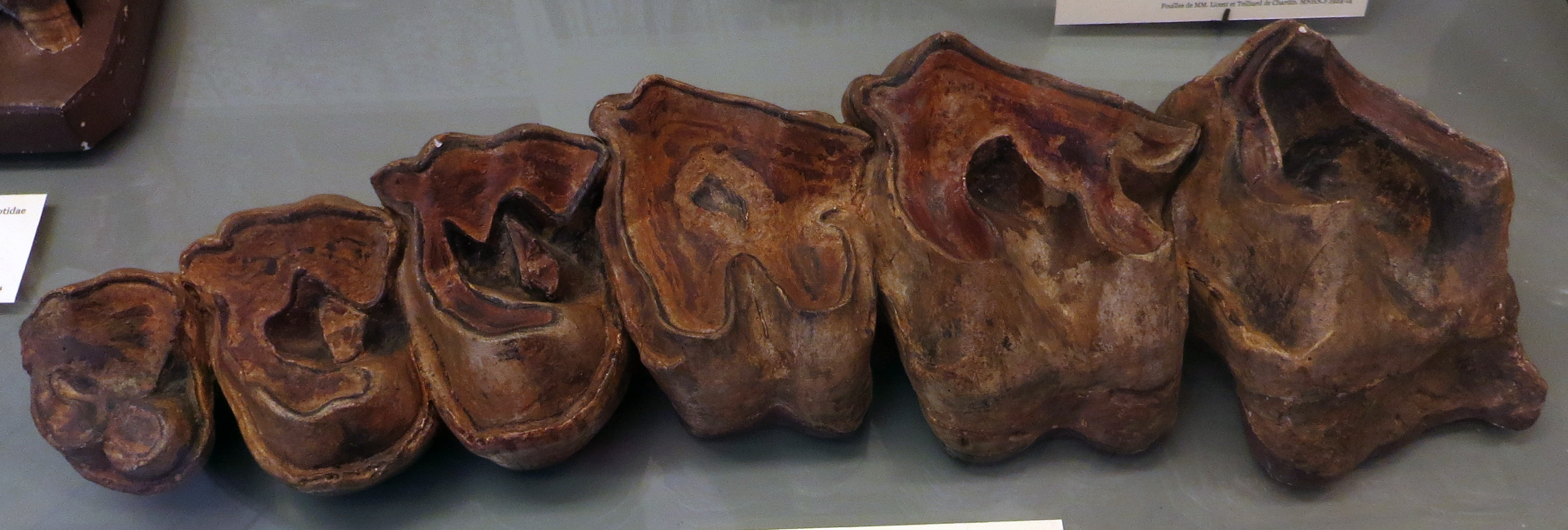
Upper molars of P. transouralicum, Musée d'Histoire Naturelle, Paris

The species of Paraceratherium are mainly discernible through skull characteristics. P. bugtiense had features such as relatively slender maxillae and premaxillae, shallow skull roofs, mastoid-paroccipital processes that were relatively thin and placed back on the skull, a lambdoid crest, which extended less back, and an occipital condyle with a horizontal orientation, which it shared with Dzungariotherium. P. transouralicum had robust maxillae and premaxillae, upturned zygomata, domed frontal bones, thick mastoid-paroccipital processes, a lambdoid crest that extended back, and occipital condyles with a vertical orientation. P. huangheense differed from P. bugtiense only in the anatomy of the rear portion of the jaw, as well as its larger size. P. linxiaense differed from the other species in that the nasal notch was deeper, with the bottom placed above the middle of molar M2, a proportionally higher occipital condyle compared to the occipital surface's height, short muzzle bones and diastema in front of the cheek teeth, and a high zygomatic arch with a prominent hind end, and a smaller upper incisor I1.

Unlike those of most primitive rhinocerotoids, the front teeth of Paraceratherium were reduced to a single pair of incisors in either jaw, which were large and conical, and have been described as tusks. The upper incisors pointed downwards; the lower ones were shorter and pointed forwards. Among known rhinoceroses, this arrangement is unique to Paraceratherium and the related Urtinotherium. The incisors may have been larger in males. The canine teeth otherwise found behind the incisors were lost. The incisors were separated from the row of cheek teeth by a large diastema (gap). This feature is found in mammals where the incisors and cheek teeth have different specialisations. The upper molars, except for the third upper molar that was V-shaped, had a pi-shaped (π) pattern and a reduced metastyle. The premolars only partially formed the pi pattern. Each molar was the size of a human fist; among mammals they were only exceeded in size by proboscideans, though they were small relative to the size of the skull. The lower cheek teeth were L-shaped, which is typical of rhinoceroses.

=== Postcranial skeleton ===
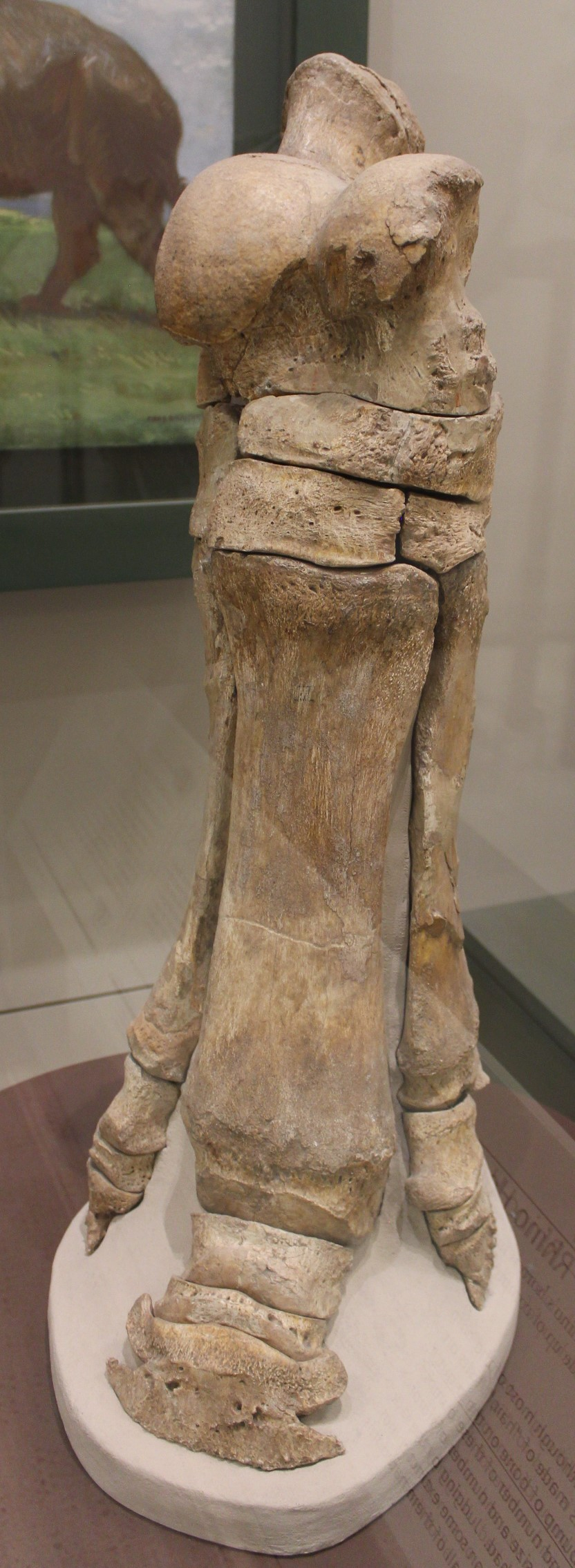
Hind foot of P. transouralicum, AMNH

No complete set of vertebrae and ribs of Paraceratherium has yet been found and the tail is completely unknown. The atlas and axis vertebrae of the neck were wider than in most modern rhinoceroses, with space for strong ligaments and muscles that would be needed to hold up the large head. The rest of the vertebrae were also very wide, and had large zygapophyses with much room for muscles, tendons, ligaments and nerves, to support the head, neck and spine. The neural spines were long and formed a long "hump" along the back, where neck muscles and nuchal ligaments for holding up the skull were attached. The ribs were similar to those of modern rhinoceroses, but the ribcage would have looked smaller in proportion to the long legs and large bodies, because modern rhinoceroses are comparatively short-limbed. The last vertebra of the lower back was fused to the sacrum, a feature found in advanced rhinoceroses. Like sauropod dinosaurs, Paraceratherium had pleurocoel-like openings (hollow parts of the bone) in their pre-sacral vertebrae, which probably helped to lighten the skeleton.

The limbs were large and robust to support the animal's large weight, and were in some ways similar to and convergent with those of elephants and sauropod dinosaurs with their likewise graviportal (heavy and slow moving) builds. Unlike such animals, which tend to lengthen the upper limb bones while shortening, fusing and compressing the lower limb, hand and foot bones, Paraceratherium had short upper limb bones and long hand and foot bones—except for the disc-shaped phalanges—similar to the running rhinoceroses from which they descended. Some foot bones were almost 50 centimetres (20 in) long. The thigh bones typically measured 1.5 m (4.9 ft), a size only exceeded by those of some elephants and dinosaurs. The thigh bones were pillar-like and much thicker and more robust than those of other rhinoceroses, and the three trochanters on the sides were much reduced, as this robustness diminished their importance. The limbs were held in a column-like posture instead of bent, as in smaller animals, which reduced the need for large limb muscles. The front limbs had three toes.

== Palaeobiology ==
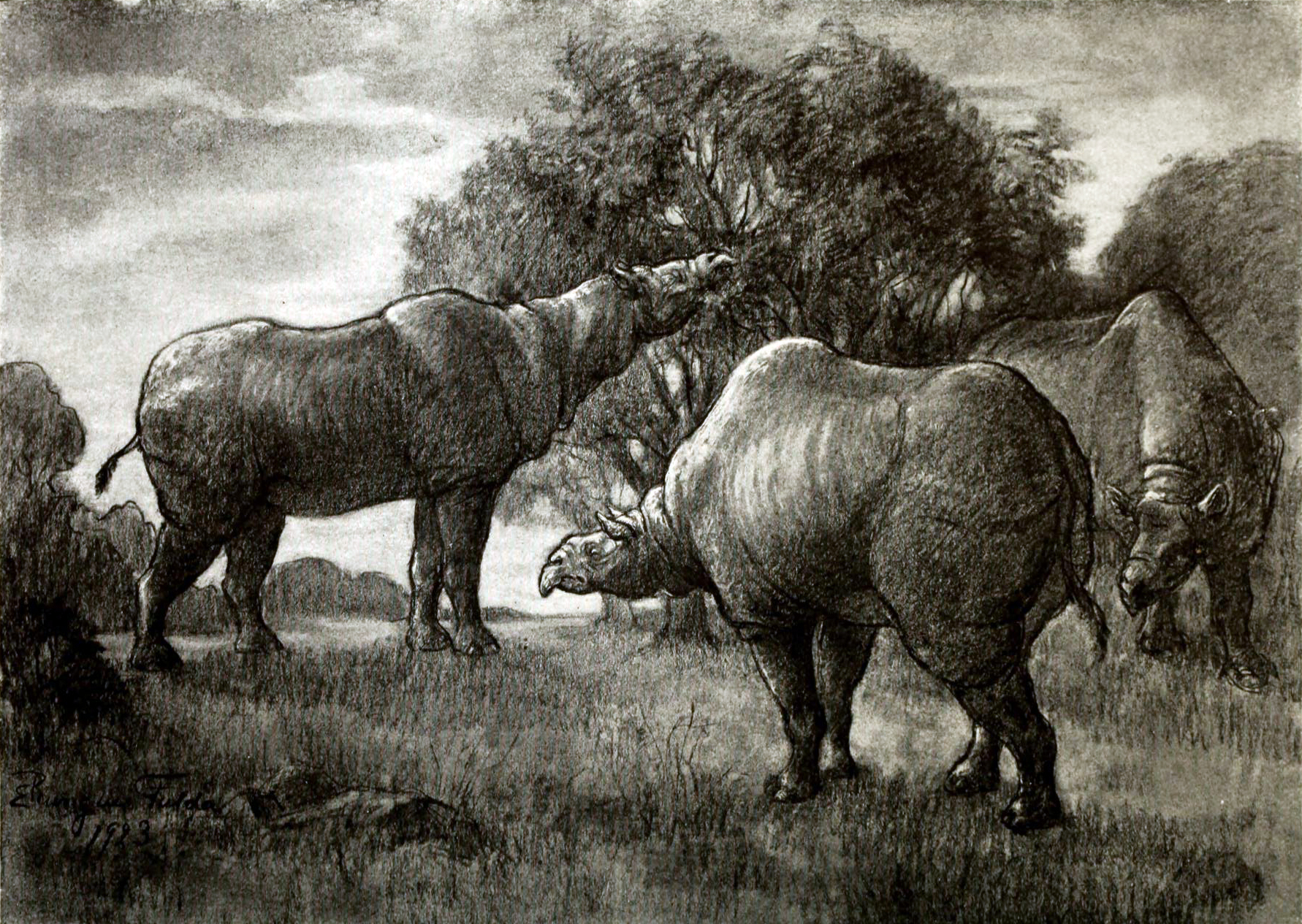
Foraging herd of P. transouralicum, by Elizabeth Rungius Fulda, 1923

The zoologist Robert M. Alexander suggested in 1988 that overheating may have been a serious problem in Paraceratherium due to its size. According to Prothero, the best living analogues for Paraceratherium may be large mammals such as elephants, rhinoceroses and hippopotamuses. To aid in thermoregulation, these animals cool down during the day by resting in the shade or by wallowing in water and mud. They also forage and move mainly at night. Because of its large size, Paraceratherium would not have been able to run and move quickly, but they would have been able to cross large distances, which would be necessary in an environment with a scarcity of food. They may therefore have had large home ranges and have been migratory. Prothero suggested that animals as big as indricotheres would need very large home ranges or territories of at least 1,000 square kilometres (250,000 acres) and that, because of a scarcity of resources, there would have been little room in Asia for many populations or a multitude of nearly identical species and genera. This principle is called competitive exclusion; it is used to explain how the black rhinoceros (a browser) and white rhinoceros (a grazer) exploit different niches in the same areas of Africa.

Most terrestrial predators in their habitat were no bigger than a modern wolf and were not a threat to Paraceratherium. Adult individuals would be too large for any land predators to attack, but the young would have been vulnerable. Bite marks on bones from the Bugti beds indicate that even adults may have been preyed on by 10-to-11-metre-long (33 to 36 ft) crocodiles, Astorgosuchus. As in elephants, the gestation period of Paraceratherium may have been lengthy and individuals may have had long lifespans. Paraceratherium may have lived in small herds, perhaps consisting of females and their calves, which they protected from predators. It has been proposed that 20 tonnes (44,000 lb) may be the maximum weight possible for land mammals, and Paraceratherium was close to this limit. The reasons mammals cannot reach the much larger size of sauropod dinosaurs are unknown. The reason may be ecological instead of biomechanical, and perhaps related to reproduction strategies. Movement, sound and other behaviours seen in CGI documentaries such as Walking With Beasts are entirely conjectural.

=== Diet and feeding ===
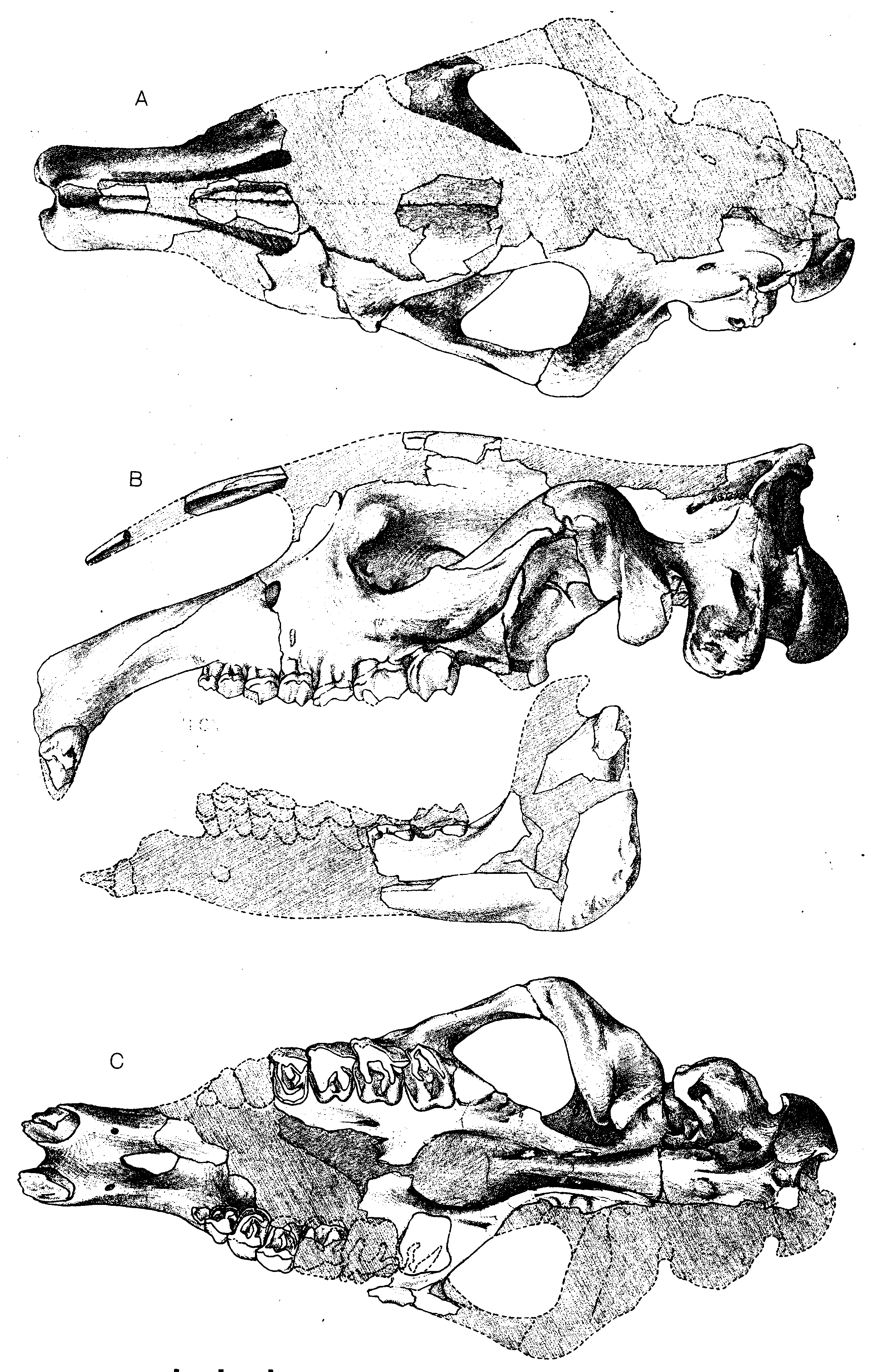
1923 illustrations of the skull of P. transouralicum

The simple, low-crowned teeth indicate that Paraceratherium was a browser with a diet consisting of relatively soft leaves and shrubs. Later rhinoceroses were grazers, with high-crowned teeth because their diets contained grit that quickly wore down their teeth. Studies of mesowear on Paraceratherium teeth confirm the creatures had a diet of soft leaves; microwear studies have yet to be conducted. Isotope analysis shows that Paraceratherium fed chiefly on C3 plants, which are mainly leaves. Like its perissodactyl relatives, the horses, tapirs and other rhinoceroses, Paraceratherium would have been a hindgut fermenter; it would extract relatively little nutrition from its food and would have to eat large volumes to survive. Like other large herbivores, Paraceratherium would have had a large digestive tract.

Granger and Gregory argued that the large incisors were used for defence or for loosening shrubs by moving the neck downwards, thereby acting as picks and levers. Tapirs use their proboscis to wrap around branches while stripping off bark with the front teeth; this ability would have been helpful to Paraceratherium. Some Russian authors suggested that the tusks were probably used for breaking twigs, stripping bark and bending high branches and that, because species from the early Oligocene had larger tusks than later ones, they probably had a more bark than leaf based diet. Since the species involved are now known to have been contemporaneous, and the differences in tusks are now thought to be sexually dimorphic, the latter idea is not accepted today.

Herds of Paraceratherium may have migrated while continuously foraging from tall trees, which smaller mammals could not reach. Osborn suggested that its mode of foraging would have been similar to that of the high-browsing giraffe and okapi, rather than to modern rhinoceroses, whose heads are carried close to the ground. The computer scientist Indrė Žliobaitė and colleagues speculated about whether indricotheres lived in Finland and how many could have been sustained in the Helsinki area, as the country does not preserve terrestrial sediments from the time these animals lived. They estimated an individual would have to consume 275–367 kilograms (606–809 lb) of vegetation per day, and that 3–21 of them could have lived there at a time.

== Distribution and habitat ==
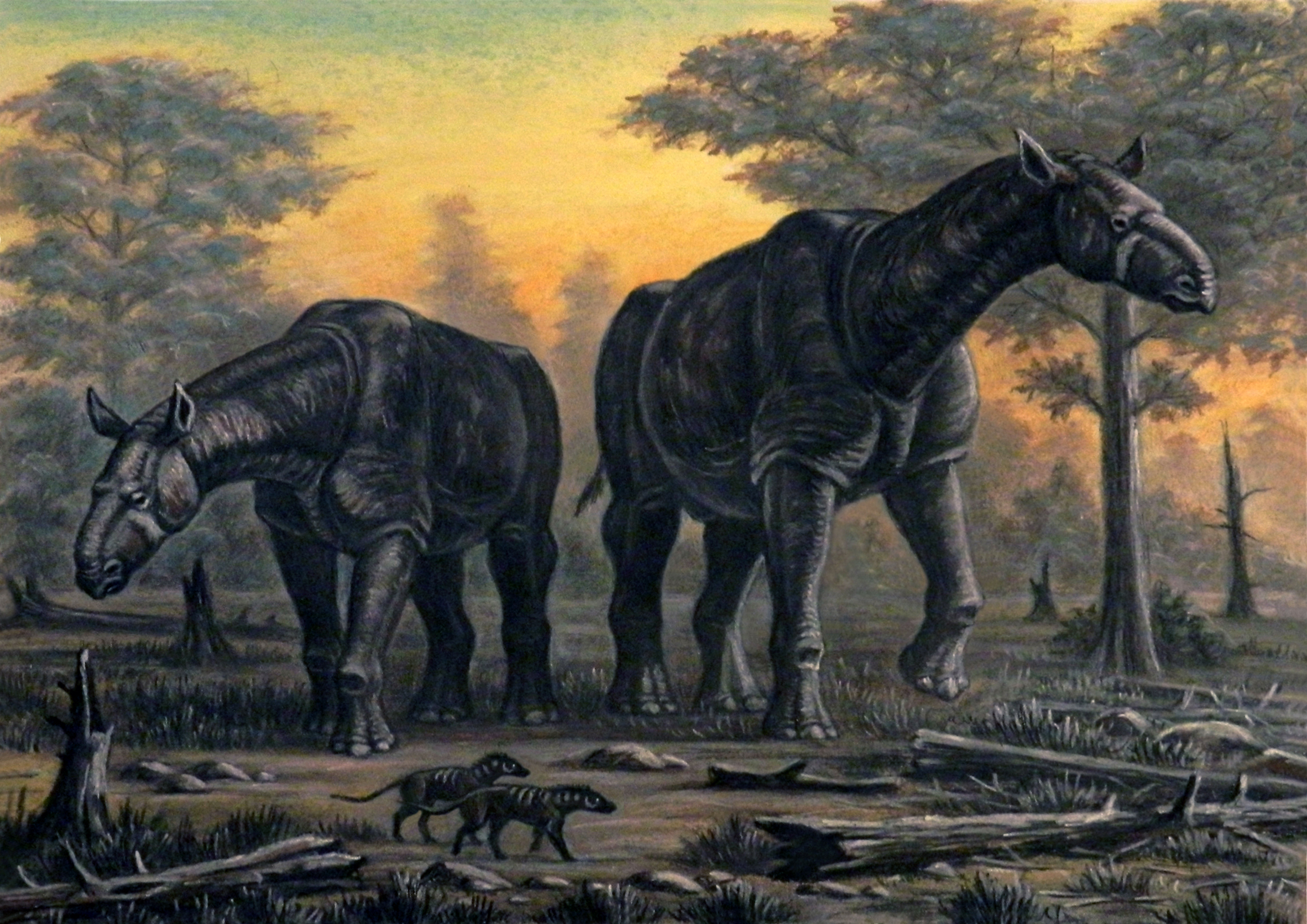
Restoration of a P. transouralicum pair, with two Hyaenodon below

Remains assignable to Paraceratherium have been found in early to late Oligocene (34–23 million years ago) formations across Eurasia, in modern-day China, Mongolia, India, Pakistan, Kazakhstan, Georgia, Turkey, Romania, Bulgaria and the Balkans. Their distribution may be correlated with the palaeogeographic development of the Alpine-Himalayan mountain belt. The range of Paraceratherium finds implies that they inhabited a continuous landmass with a similar environment across it, but this is contradicted by palaeogeographic maps that show this area had various marine barriers, so the genus was successful in being widely distributed despite this. The fauna which coexisted with Paraceratherium included other rhinocerotoids, artiodactyls, rodents, amphicyonids, mustelids, hyaenodonts, nimravids and felids.

The habitat of Paraceratherium appears to have varied across its range, based on the types of geological formations it has been found in. The Hsanda Gol Formation of Mongolia represents an arid desert basin, and the environment is thought to have had few tall trees and limited brush cover, as the fauna consisted mainly of animals that fed from tree tops or close to the ground. A study of fossil pollen showed that much of China was woody shrubland, with plants such as saltbush, mormon tea (Ephedra) and nitre bush (Nitraria), all adapted to arid environments. Trees were rare, and concentrated near groundwater. The parts of China where Paraceratherium lived had dry lakes and abundant sand dunes, and the most common plant fossils are leaves of the desert-adapted Palibinia. Trees in Mongolia and China included birch, elm, oaks and other deciduous trees, while Siberia and Kazakhstan also had walnut trees. Dera Bugti in Pakistan had dry, temperate to subtropical forest.

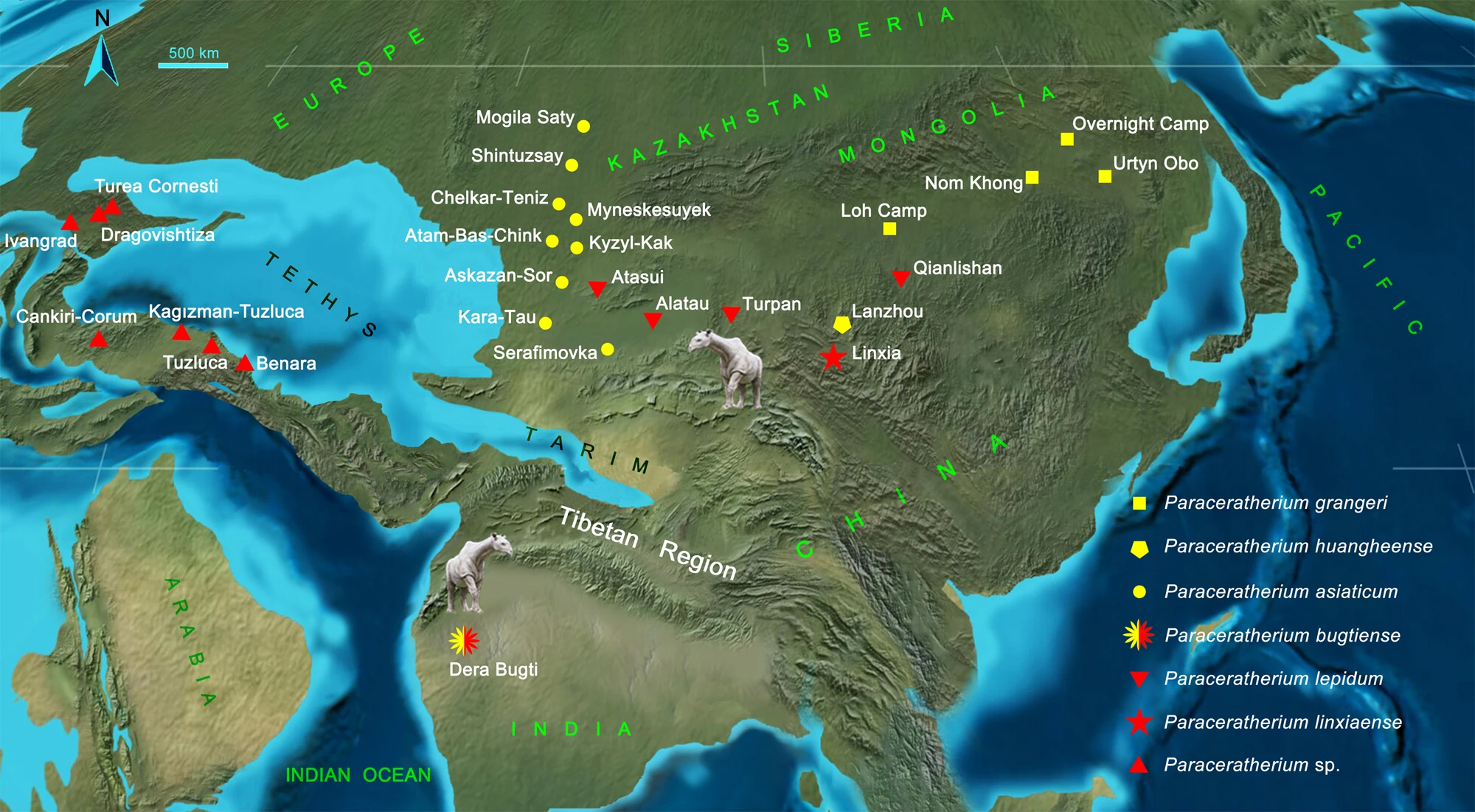
Map showing localities of Paraceratherium species during the early (yellow) and late (red) Oligocene, according to Deng and colleagues, 2021

Deng and colleagues speculated about the palaeobiogeography of Paraceratherium based on their phylogenetic analys in 2021. They found that P. bugtiense was the only species of the genus represented in the Oligocene of western Pakistan, while the genus was highly diversified across the Mongolian Plateau, northwestern China and Kazakhstan north to the Tibetan Plateau. They hypothesised that P. asiaticum dispersed westward to Kazakhstan during the early Oligocene from the ancestral area of Mongolia, where the most primitive member of the genus, P. grangeri, lived, and descendants may have continued to South Asia as P. bugtiense, dispersing through the Tibetan region. P. lepidum existed in Xinjiang and Kazakhstan and P. linxiaense in Linxia during the late Oligocene, and it is possible that these sister species of P. bugtiense had been able to migrate back north to Central Asia during this time when that area had become tropical (it was arid during the early Oligocene). This implies the Tibetan region was not yet a high-elevation plateau that could act as a barrier, and large animals may therefore have been able to move freely along the eastern coast of the Tethys sea, and through lowlands in the area, some of which were possibly under 2,000 m (6,600 ft) in elevation at the time.

== Extinction ==
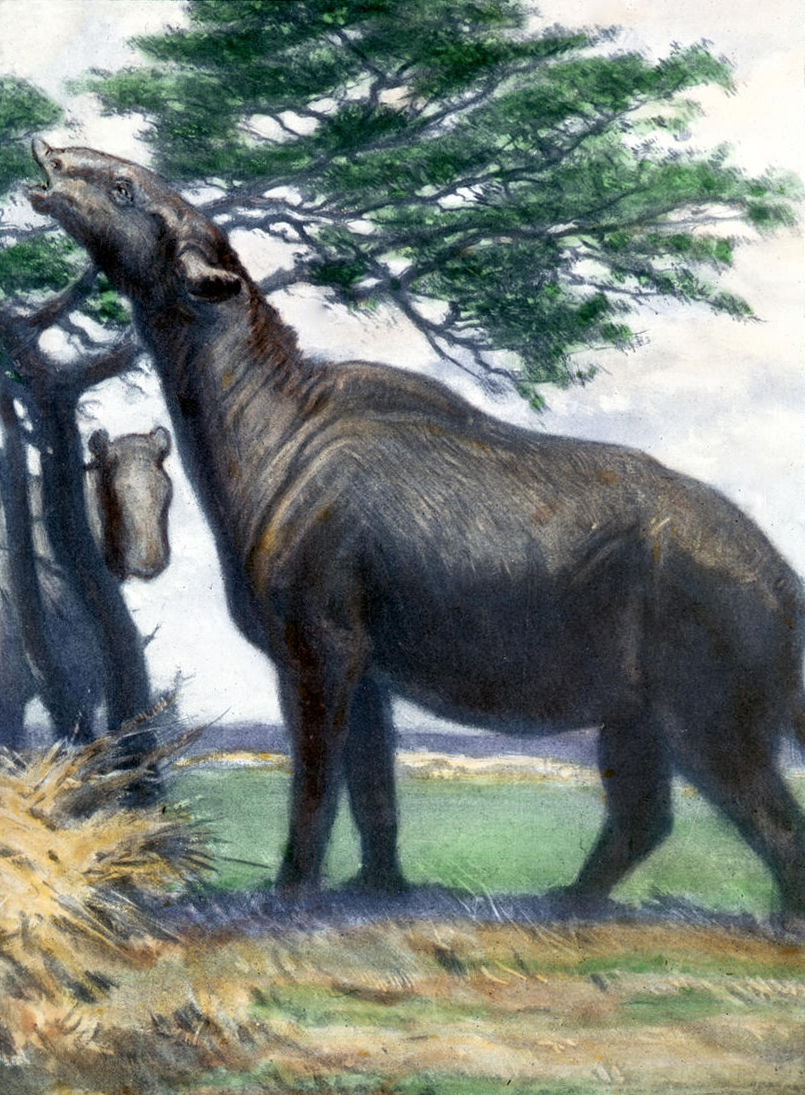
Restoration of a feeding P. transouralicum by Charles R. Knight, 1923

The reasons Paraceratherium and its relatives became extinct after surviving for about 11 million years are unknown, but it is unlikely that there was a single cause. Theories include that their large size was related to the now outdated concept of inadaptive evolution, climate change, vegetational change and low reproduction rate. Prothero and the Russian zoologist Pavel V. Putshkov have considered these causes unlikely since these animals managed to survive regardless of these issues for millions of years under the harsh conditions of their environment, and were not much larger than the biggest proboscideans, extinct as well as extant, which faced similar challenges.

The paleontologist Andrzej H. Kulczicki and Putshkov instead suggested in 1995 and 2001 that invading gomphothere proboscideans from Africa in the late Oligocene (between 28 and 23 million years ago) may have considerably changed the habitats they entered, like African elephants do today. This would have made food scarcer for Paraceratherium, and as their numbers dwindled, they would have become more vulnerable to other threats. Prothero has pointed out that gomphotheres are not known to have generally coexisted with paraceratheres, and there are no known co-occurrences between paraceratheres and the large deinotheres, which would have been their most likely competitors. While cautioning that the true cause of their extinction will never be known for certain, Prothero found it to be more than a coincidence that paraceratheres disappeared just as large predators and other large herbivores entered Asia during the early Miocene (between 23 and 16 million years ago).

== Bibliography ==
- Prothero, D. (2013). Rhinoceros Giants: The Palaeobiology of Indricotheres. Indiana: Indiana University Press. ISBN 978-0-253-00819-0.
