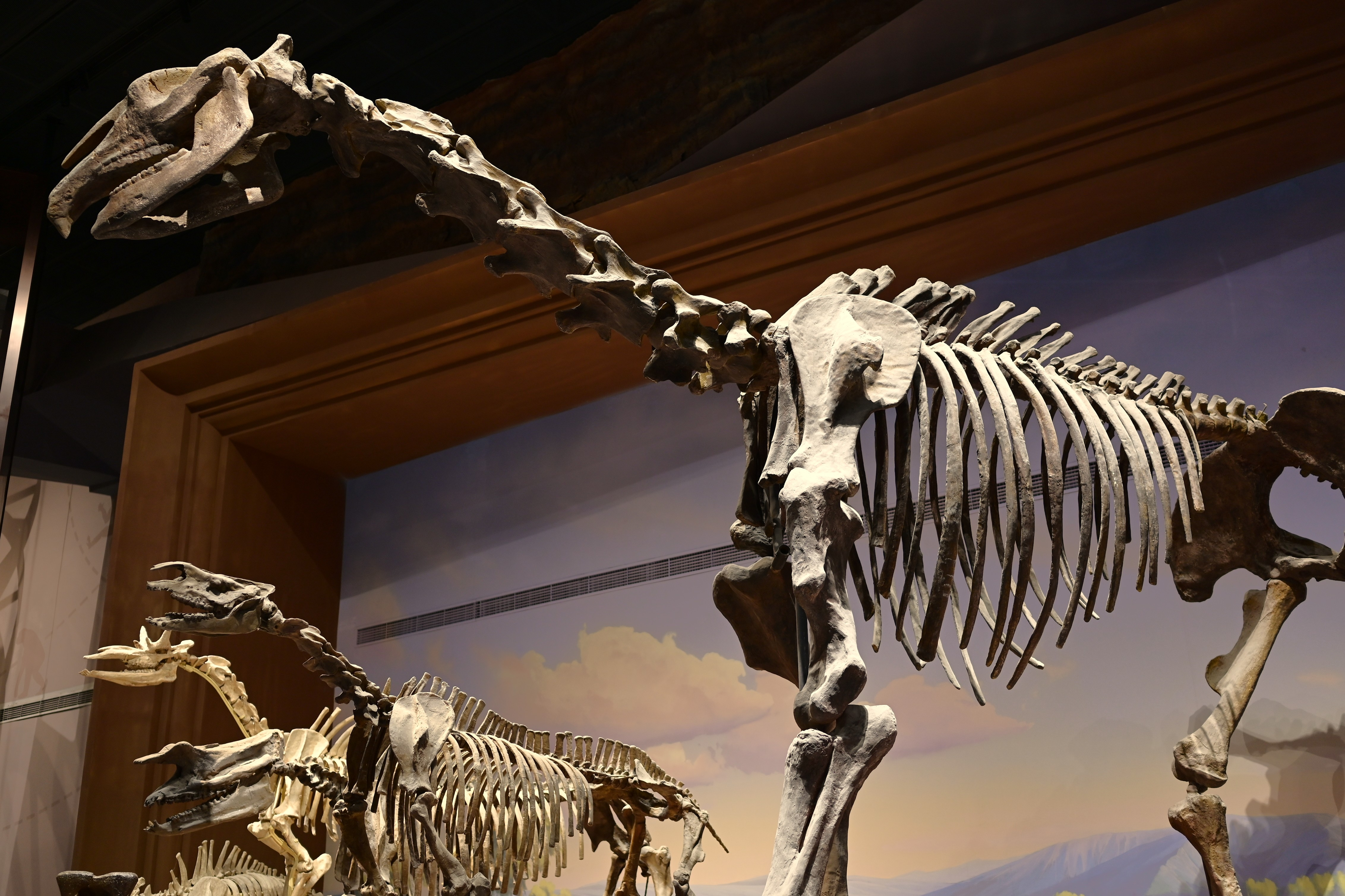
- Skeletal mount of D. orgosense, Baoding Natural History Museum

Scientific classification
- Kingdom: Animalia
- Phylum: Chordata
- Class: Mammalia
- Order: Perissodactyla
- Family: †Paraceratheriidae
- Genus: †Dzungariotherium; Chiu, 1973

Type species
- †Dzungariotherium orgosense Chiu, 1973

Species
- †D. orgosense Chiu, 1973; †D. tienshanense (Chiu, 1962); †D. turfanense Xu & Wang, 1978

Synonyms
- †Dzungariotherium turfanensis Xu & Wang, 1978; †Paraceratherium lipidus Xu & Wang, 1978; †P. lepidum Xu & Wang, 1978; †P. tienshanensis Chiu, 1962; †P. orgosensis (Chiu, 1973)

= Dzungariotherium =

Dzungariotherium Temporal range: Oligocene, 34–23 Ma

Extinct genus of indricothere

Dzungariotherium is a genus of paraceratheriid, an extinct group of large, hornless rhinocerotoids, which lived during the middle and late Oligocene of northwest China. The type species D. orgosense was described in 1973 based on fossils—mainly teeth—from Dzungaria in Xinjiang, northwest China. It likely surpassed Paraceratherium in size according to a 2022 estimate.

== Description ==
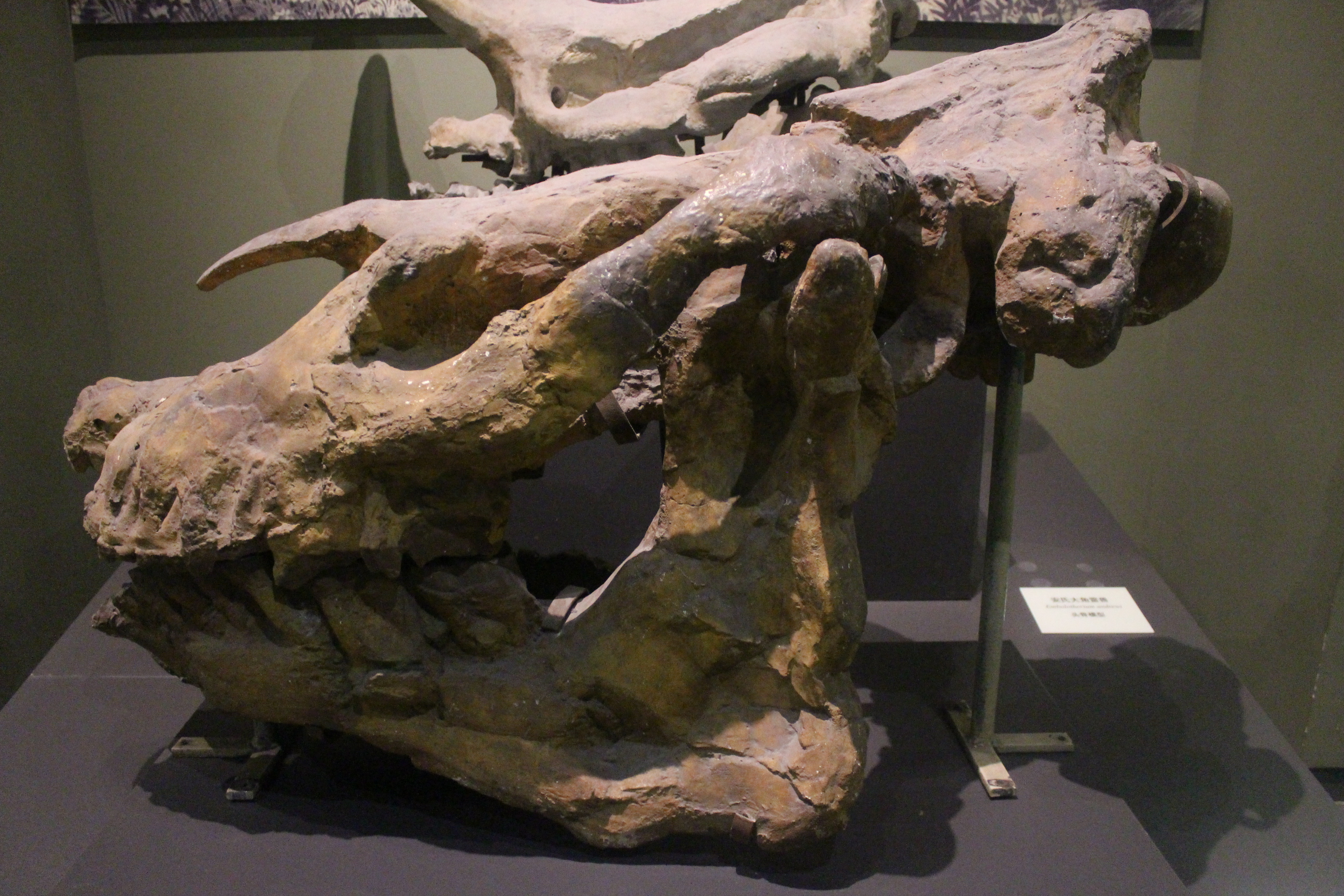
Skull of D. orgosense at the Tianjin Natural History Museum

The teeth of D. orgosense (from which that species is mainly known) are 25 percent larger than those of Paraceratherium transouralicum, indicating that it was one of the largest-known paraceratheriids, but the teeth and skull were proportionally large compared to the body, making it smaller overall. Skull length range is 126–143 cm. The mass of a D. sp specimen was estimated to be 20.6 tonnes (45,000 lb), making it slightly larger than Paraceratherium. It may have been among the largest known terrestrial mammals; however, comparisons with Palaeoloxodon namadicus remain uncertain, as femur-based estimates for the elephant published in 2015 have been suggested to be overestimated.

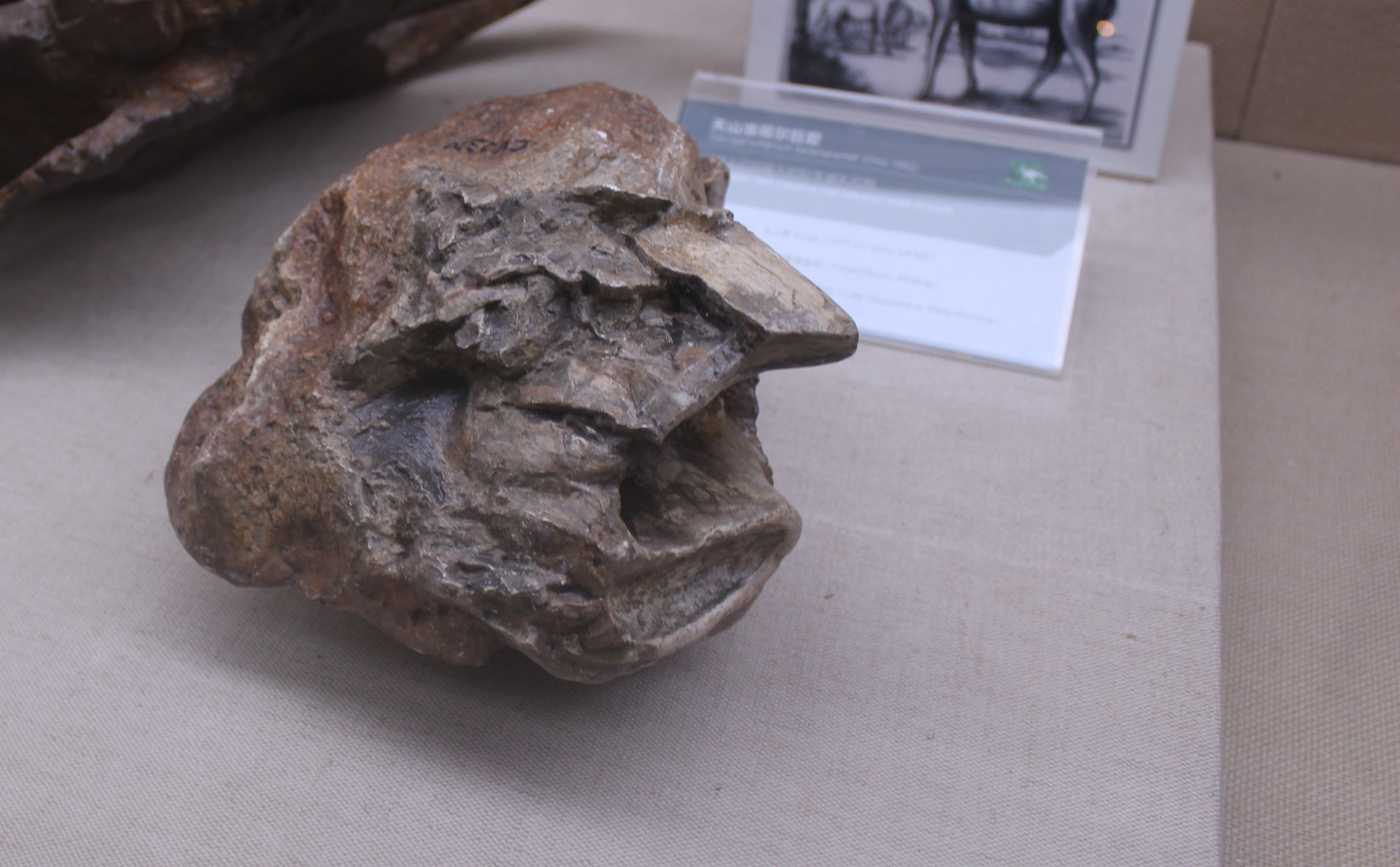
Tooth, Paleozoological Museum of China

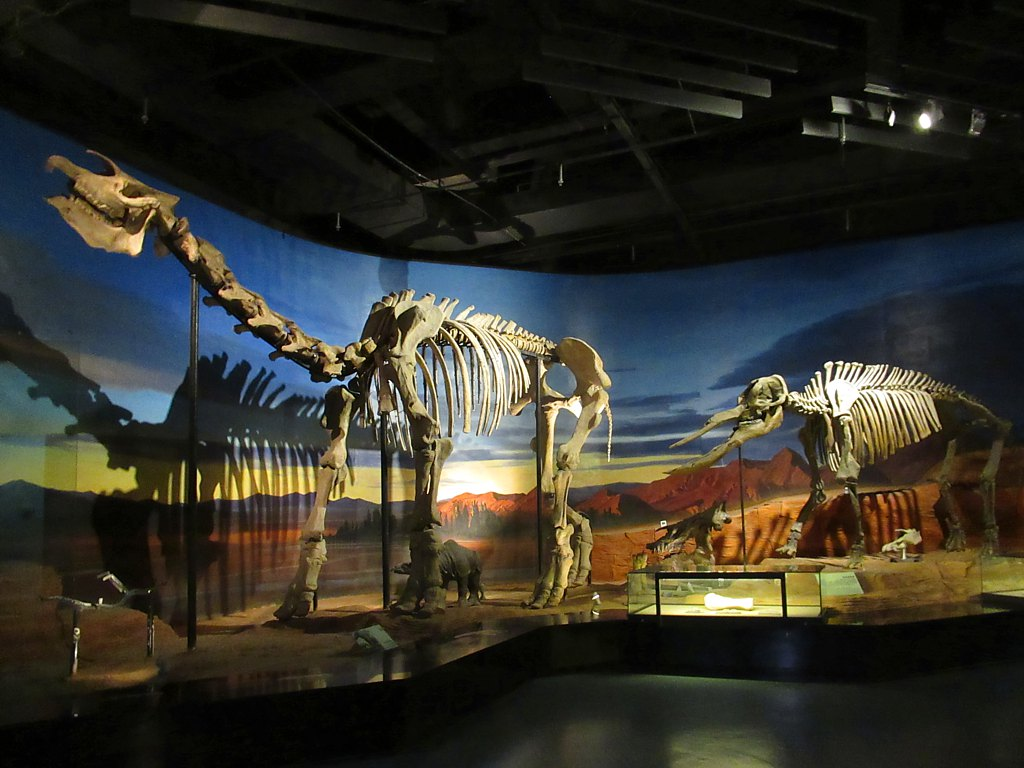
Skeletal mount (left) of Paraceratherium lepdium, which is possibly a synonym of D. turfanense, Turpan Museum

Paraceratherium bugtiense and D. orgosense share features such as relatively slender maxillae and premaxillae, shallow skull roofs, mastoid-paroccipital processes that are relatively thin and placed back on the skull, a lambdoid crest, which extends less back, and an occipital condyle with a horizontal orientation. D. orgosense is distinguished from Paraceratherium species by the larger size of its teeth, and distinct crochets of its molars.
