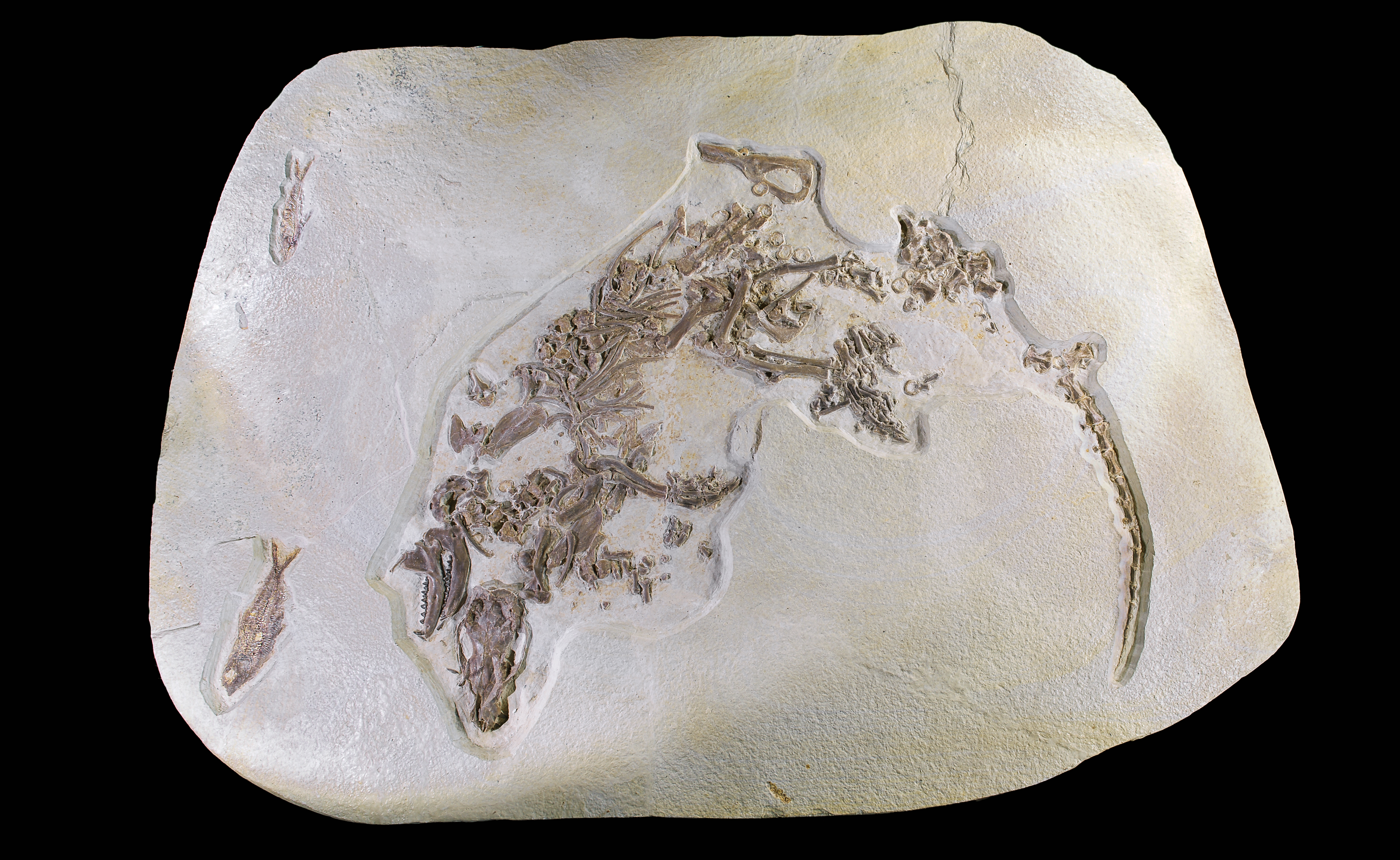
- Palaeosinopa from Wyoming Eocene

Scientific classification
- Kingdom: Animalia
- Phylum: Chordata
- Class: Mammalia
- Clade: Eutheria
- Order: †Cimolesta; McKenna 1975

Subgroups
- Pantolesta?; Pantolestidae; Paroxyclaenidae; Dulcidon; Paroxyclaeninae; Kiinkerishella; Kopidodon; Paraspaniella; Paroxyclaenus; Pugiodens; Sororodon; Spaniella; Vulpavoides; Merialinae; Euhookeria; Fratrodon; Merialus; Procerberus; Cimolestidae; Aboletylestes; Acmeodon; Alveugena; Ambilestes; Avunculus; Bagalestes; Batodon; Betonnia; Chacopterygus; Cimolestes; Didelphodus; Gelastops; Ilerdoryctes; Maelestes; Naranius; Nyssodon; Paleotomus; Procerberus; Protentomodon; Puercolestes; Scollardius; Suratilestes; Telacodon; Tinerhodon; Tsaganius; Palaeoryctidae?; Taeniodonta?

= Cimolesta =

Cimolesta Temporal range: ~80–28.4 Ma Late Cretaceous – Early Oligocene

Extinct order of mammals

Cimolesta is an extinct order of non-placental, eutherian mammals. Cimolestans had a wide variety of body shapes, dentition and lifestyles, though the majority of them were small to medium-sized general mammals that bore superficial resemblances to rodents, lagomorphs, mustelids, and marsupials.

== Classification ==
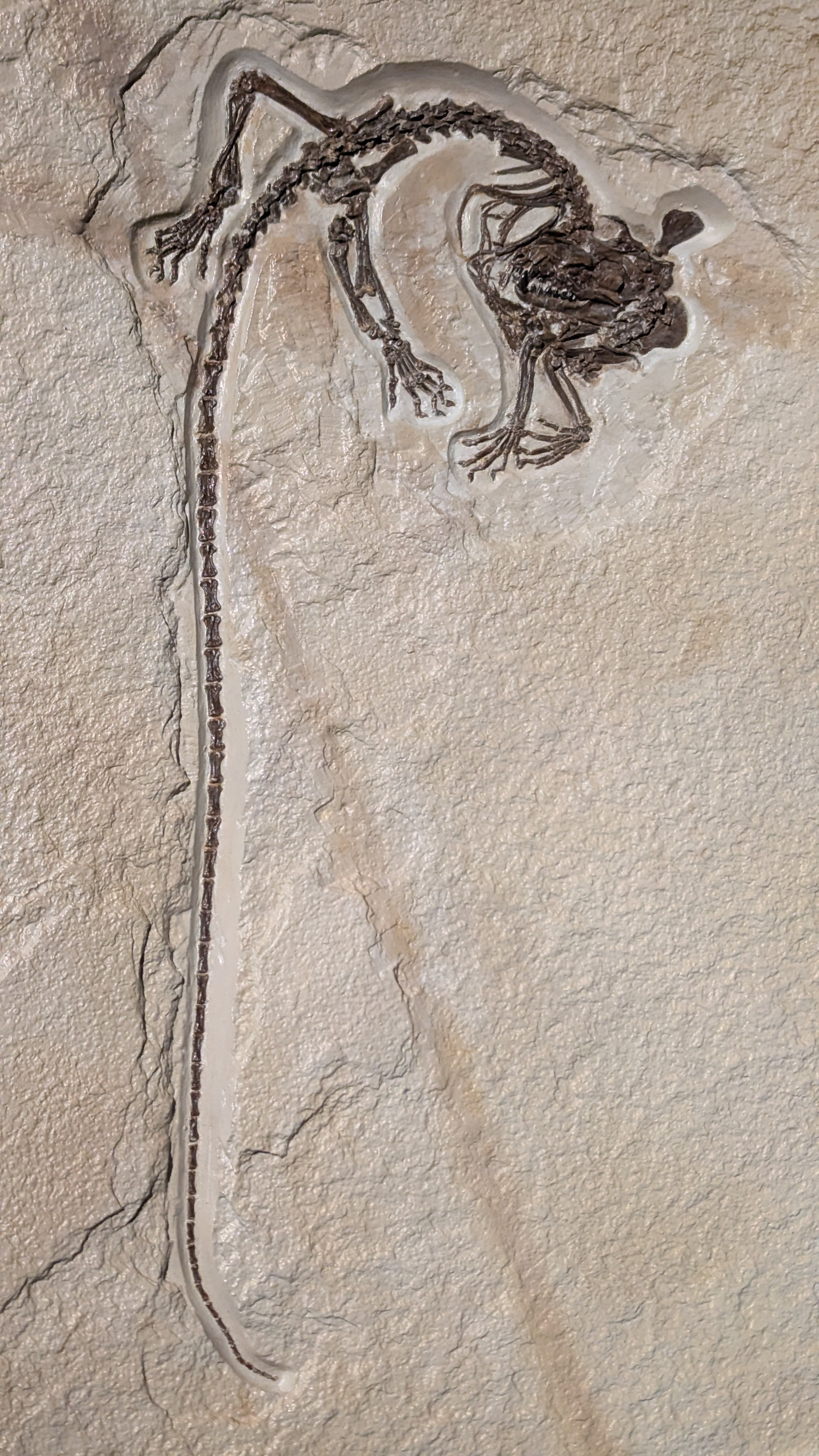
Fossil from the Fossil Lake in the Field Museum

Several groups have previously been suggested to have descended from the Cimolesta: the Pholidota (which would have been regarded as a suborder of Cimolesta), the Creodonta, and the Carnivora. The origins of the enigmatic Pantodonta, Tillodonta and Dinocerata have all been suggested to lie within the Cimolesta as well. However, recent studies have revealed that cimolestans are more likely to be basal, non-placental eutherians, with no living descendants.

Some experts had placed the pangolins within Cimolesta, though the current consensus is that the pangolins should be placed within their own order, Pholidota, as a sister taxon to Carnivora within Ferae. Some have also placed the enigmatic family Ptolemaiidae within Cimolesta, also due to similarities between dental and skull anatomies with those of Pantolesta. If the ptolemaiids were indeed cimolestids, then Cimolesta would have ranged from the Late Cretaceous to the early Miocene, when the last ptolemaiid, Kelba, disappeared in Eastern Africa. However, more thorough studies suggest that the ptolemaiids were more likely afrotheres related to aardvarks, tenrecs and golden moles. If one ignores the ptolemaiids as afrotherians, then the last, unequivocal cimolestids, the pantolestids Gobiopithecus and Kiinkerishella, died out during the Late Eocene or early Oligocene.

The cimolestid Procerberus may have been closely related to Taeniodonta. Procerberus was the largest cimolestid and different species may be closer to conoryctid taeniodonts and others to stylinodontine taeniodonts. However, Procerberus has been found by cladistic analysis to be outside of a Taeniodonta + Alveugena carbonensis clade, with Procerberus grandis being closer to that clade than to other Procerberus species.

== Sources ==
- McKenna, MC (1975). "Toward a phylogenetic classification of the Mammalia". In Luckett, WP; Szalay, FS (eds.). Phylogeny of the primates: a multidisciplinary approach (Proceedings of WennerGren Symposium no. 61, Burg Wartenstein, Austria, July 6–14, 1974. New York: Plenum. pp. 21–46. doi:10.1007/978-1-4684-2166-8_2. ISBN 978-1-4684-2168-2.
- McKenna, M.C.; Bell, S.K. (1997). Classification of mammals above the species level. New York: Columbia University Press. ISBN 978-0-231-11013-6.
- Rose, KD (2006). The beginning of the age of mammals. Baltimore: JHU Press. ISBN 978-0801884726.
- Simons, EL; Bown, TM (April 11, 1995). "Ptolemaiida, a new order of Mammalia--with description of the cranium of Ptolemaia grangeri". PNAS. 92 (8): 3269–73. Bibcode:1995PNAS...92.3269S. doi:10.1073/pnas.92.8.3269. PMC 42147. PMID 11607526.
