= Chitarwata =

Chitarwata can refer to:

- The Chitarwata Formation, a geological formation in western Pakistan.
- The Chitarwata Post located in the Sulaiman Mountains, Punjab, Pakistan
