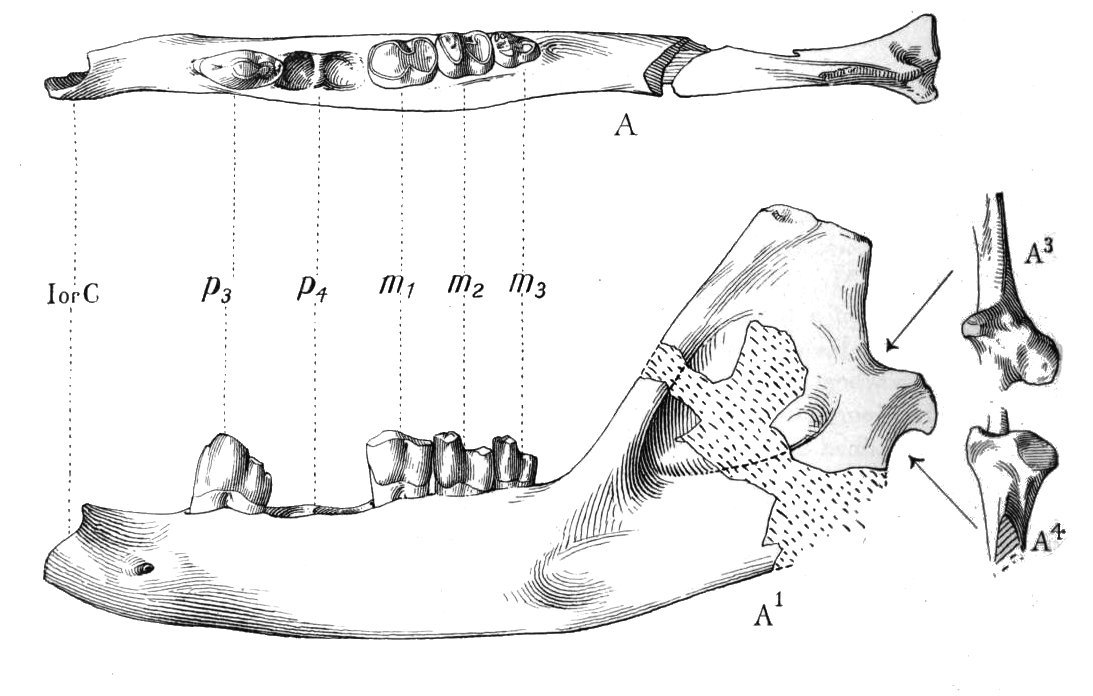
- Lower jaw of Ptolemaia lyonsi

Scientific classification
- Kingdom: Animalia
- Phylum: Chordata
- Class: Mammalia
- Superorder: Afrotheria
- Grandorder: Afroinsectiphilia
- Order: †Ptolemaiida; Simons & Bown, 1995

Families and genera
- Ptolemaiidae Osborn, 1908; Cleopatrodon; Ptolemaia (type genus); Kelbidae; Kelba; incertae sedis; Qarunavus

= Ptolemaiida =

Ptolemaiida Temporal range: Latest Eocene to ?Miocene

Extinct order of mammals

Ptolemaiida is a taxon of wolf-sized afrothere mammals that lived in northern and eastern Africa during the Paleogene. The oldest fossils are from the latest Eocene strata of the Jebel Qatrani Formation, near the Fayum oasis in Egypt. A tooth is known from an Oligocene-aged stratum in Angola, and Miocene specimens (of Kelba) are known from Kenya and Uganda.

The origin of the Ptolemaiida is obscure, and debated. The type species was originally thought to be a primate, but, later, when elongated skulls with long canines of Ptolemaia and Qarunavus were found, they were then thought to be hyaenodontids, or giant, carnivorous relatives of the pantolestids Palaeosinopa, and of modern shrews The family Ptolemaiidae was elevated to order level in 1995, although some experts later placed the Ptolemaiidae within the pantolestids.

Recently, Ptolemaiida has been placed within Afrotheria on the basis of paleobiology, as the taxon was endemic to Africa, and because of some similarities in the anatomical features of the skull in common with aardvarks. It is currently unclear if they form a sister taxon to Tubulidentata or are a paraphyletic sequence leading to them. Regardless, their close relation may offer the possibility for true dental synapomorphies in Afroinsectiphilia. A posterior study on ptolemaiidan dentitions further reinforces these results.

Recently, there has been a reconsideration of the ptolemaiidan diet, and possible behavior, as wear on the teeth suggest that it crushed hard or abrasive food, and that the teeth had little or no shearing ability. Even so, some sources still refer to them as being gigantic, carnivorous shrews.
