= Welcommoides =

Welcommoides Temporal range: 31.0–29.0 Ma Early Oligocene

Scientific classification
- Kingdom: Animalia
- Phylum: Chordata
- Class: Mammalia
- Order: †Pantolesta
- Family: †Paroxyclaenidae
- Subfamily: †Merialinae
- Genus: †Welcommoides; Solé, 2024

Type species
- †Welcommoides gurki Solé, 2024

Extinct genus of mammals

Welcommoides ("Welcommes animal") is an extinct genus of placental mammals from subfamily Merialinae within family Paroxyclaenidae, that lived during the early Oligocene (Rupelian) in the lower Chitarwata Formation located in the Bugti Hills of Pakistan.
