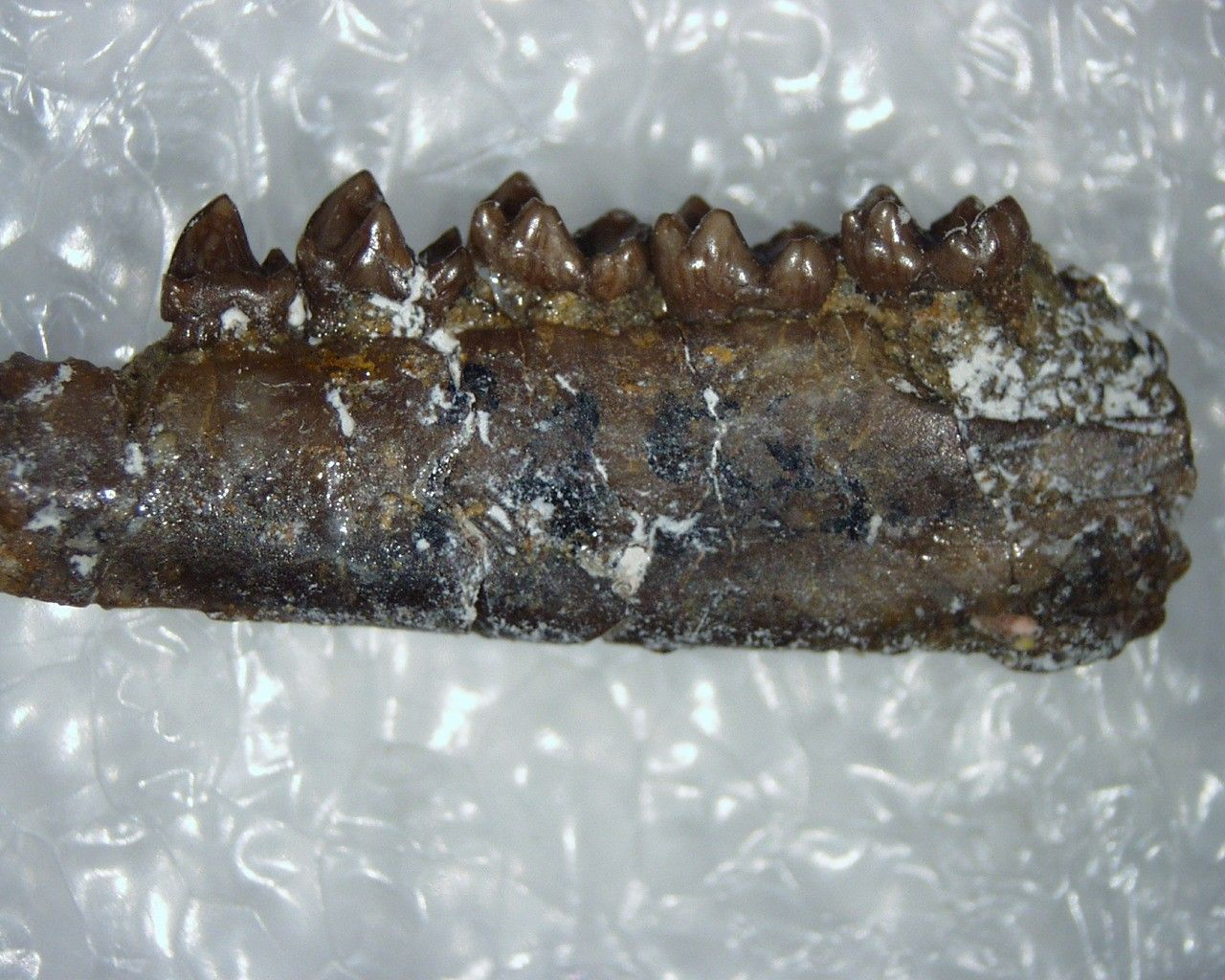
- mandibula of Bisonalveus browni

Scientific classification
- Kingdom: Animalia
- Phylum: Chordata
- Class: Mammalia
- Infraclass: Placentalia
- Order: †Pantolesta
- Family: †Pentacodontidae
- Genus: †Bisonalveus; Gazin, 1956

Type species
- †Bisonalveus browni Gazin, 1956

Species
- †B. browni (Gazin, 1956); †B. gracilis (Fox & Scott, 2020); †B. holtzmani (Gingerich, 1983)

= Bisonalveus =

Bisonalveus Temporal range: 60.9–57.8 Ma Middle to Late Paleocene

Extinct genus of mammals

Bisonalveus ("animal from Bison Basin") is an extinct genus of placental mammals from family Pentacodontidae, that lived during the middle to late Paleocene. Bisonalveus fossils have been discovered in the upper Great Plains region of North America, including sites in modern-day Wyoming, North Dakota, Montana, and Alberta.

== Description ==
Bisonalveus is an extinct genus of shrew-like mammals that were presumably ground-dwelling and fed on plants and insects.

=== Bisonalveus browni ===
Bisonalveus browni was discovered in 1956 from fossilized jaw fragments (including molars). Later discovered fossils included front teeth and a dagger-like canine tooth with an enameled groove. The canines do not have a corresponding surface on the lower jaw, indicating that they were not used for chewing, but rather for stabbing. That would mean Bisonalveus was a predator, presumably hunting small insects. The grooves on the canines may have been used for delivering venomous saliva into the prey, which would thereby make Bisonalveus one of the few known venomous mammals. Perhaps, like the modern solenodon, Bisonalveus bit its victims to inject its toxic saliva and buried the immobilized prey in a cache for later consumption. However, because several nonvenomous mammals (such as baboons and other primates) have similar grooves on their teeth, some scientists have questioned whether these grooves truly indicate venom delivery. If Bisonalveus was a forager, the grooves might have served the purpose of introducing (nonvenomous) saliva for digestive reasons. Alternatively, the grooves might have been useful as they increased the amount of enamel on the canines, thereby strengthening these slender teeth.

=== Bisonalveus holtzmani ===
Bisonalveus holtzmani is named for Dr. Richard Holtzman, who, in 1978, described the first tooth that was later determined to belong to this species. B. holtzmani can be distinguished from B. browni in that it is about 30% larger.
