= Aatotomus =

Aatotomus Temporal range: 57.8–57.4 Ma Late Paleocene

Scientific classification
- Kingdom: Animalia
- Phylum: Chordata
- Class: Mammalia
- Order: †Pantolesta
- Family: †Pantolestidae
- Genus: †Aatotomus; Rankin, 2014

Type species
- †Aatotomus placochton Rankin, 2014

Extinct genus of mammals

Aatotomus is an extinct genus of placental mammals from family Pantolestidae, that lived during the late Paleocene. It is known from fossils found in the Ravenscrag Formation of Saskatchewan province (Canada), being a member of the Roche Percée local fauna.
