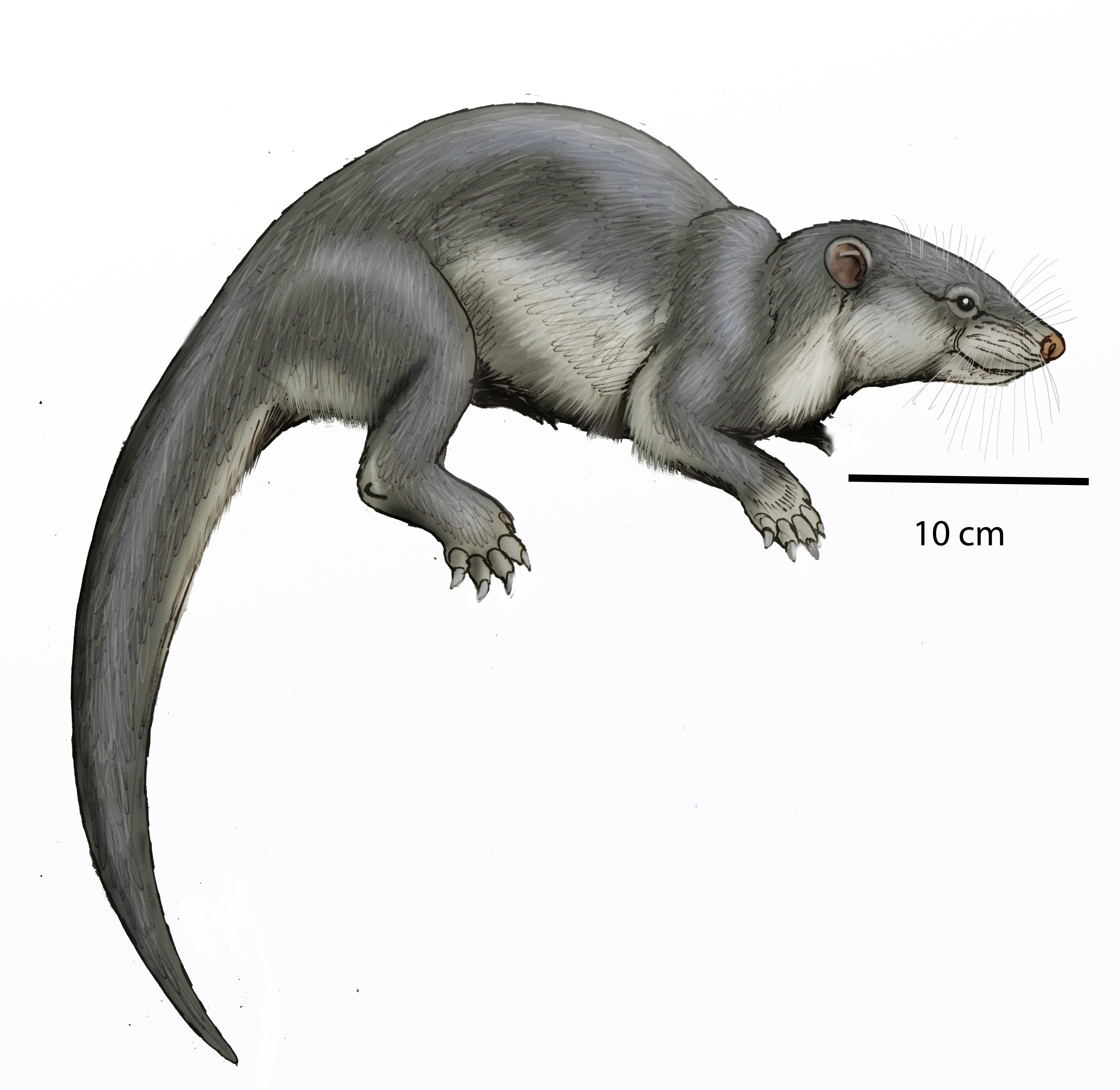
- Life reconstruction of Buxolestes piscator
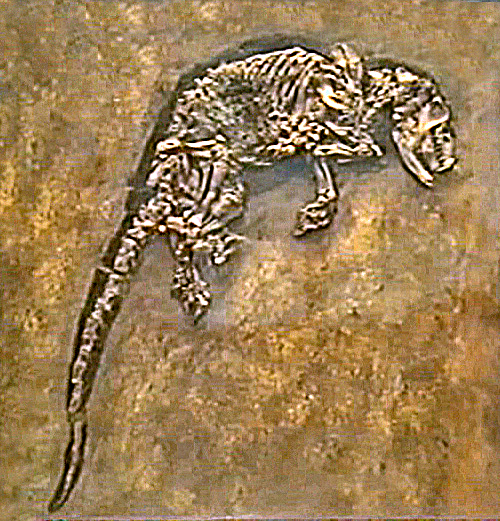
- fossil of Buxolestes minor from Messel Pit Fossil Site at the Naturmuseum Senckenberg

Scientific classification
- Kingdom: Animalia
- Phylum: Chordata
- Class: Mammalia
- Order: †Pantolesta
- Family: †Pantolestidae
- Subfamily: †Pantolestinae
- Genus: †Buxolestes; Jaeger, 1970

Type species
- †Buxolestes hammeli Jaegar, 1970

Species
- †B. hammeli (Jaegar, 1970); †B. minor (Pfretzschner, 1999); †B. piscator (Koenigswald, 1980)

= Buxolestes =

Buxolestes Temporal range: 47.8–43.5 Ma Middle Eocene

Extinct genus of mammals

Buxolestes ("robber from Bouxwiller") is an extinct genus of semi-aquatic mammals belonging to the subfamily Pantolestinae within family Pantolestidae. Species in this genus lived during the middle Eocene. They are known from fossils found in the Bracklesham Group and Wittering Formation of England, at the Messel Pit in Germany and in Bouxwiller, France.

== Description ==
Buxolestes were otter-like freshwater fish predators with a body length reaching about 46 centimetres (18 in) and a tail about 35 centimetres (14 in) long. They were significantly smaller than most living species of otters. Fossilized stomach contents confirm their semiaquatic freshwater habits. The anatomy of these archaic "insectivorous" mammals is known through well-preserved Middle Eocene specimens found at Messel in Germany. Their structure evidences a clear adaptation to a semiaquatic way of life. The forelimbs and hindlimbs are powerful and show strong claws. The tail is clearly fit for swimming. The skull is long, with large molars that appear to be adapted to a diet of molluscs with shells (freshwater clams and freshwater snails), but the predilection postulated from the dentition has not been confirmed.
