= Chitarwata Formation =

Neo-Paleogene fossiliferous formation in Pakistan

- Stratigraphic range: Early Oligocene (Rupelian)-Early Miocene (Burdigalian); ~28–17 Ma
- Type: Geological formation
- Sub-units: Bugti Member
- Overlies: Vihowa Formation

Lithology
- Primary: Sandstone
- Other: Claystone

Location
- Coordinates: 29.0°N 69.0°E
- Approximate paleocoordinates: 19.4°N 67.7°E
- Region: Balochistan
- Country: Pakistan

Type section
- Named for: Chitarwata
- Chitarwata Formation (Pakistan)

The Chitarwata Formation is a geological formation in western Pakistan, made up of Oligocene and early Miocene terrestrial fluvial facies. The sediments were deposited in coastal depositional environments (estuarine, strandplain and tidal flats) when Pakistan was partly covered by the Tethys Ocean.

Paleomagnetic data indicates an age range of around 28 to 17 million years ago, with its base in the Oligocene, and its upper boundary, where it meets the overlying Vihowa Formation, of the Early Miocene.

Together with the Vihowa Formation, the Chitarwata Formation records the sedimentation of the Himalayan foreland basin during the collision of the Indian and Asian tectonic plates, the transition from marginal marine to fluvial environments, and the rise of the Himalayas.

== Fossil content ==
The Chitarwata Formation has provided a wealth of terrestrial mammal fossils of the late Paleogene and early Neogene, or Tabenbulakian; the last of the Asian land mammal ages (ALMA).

Among many others, the following fossils are reported from the formation:

| Color key: Taxon / Reclassified taxon / Taxon falsely reported as present / Dubious taxon or junior synonym / Ichnotaxon / Ootaxon / Morphotaxon | Notes; Uncertain or tentative taxa are in small text; ~~crossed out~~ taxa are discredited. |

=== Mammals ===
==== Artiodactyl ====
===== Anthracothere =====
Anthracotheriidaes of the Chitarwata Formation
| Genus | Species | Location | Materials | Notes | Image |
|---|---|---|---|---|---|
| Anthracotherium | A. adiposum | Lando Chur | | | |
| Anthracotherium | A. bugtiense | Lando Chur | | | |
| Anthracotherium | A. silistrense | | | | |
| Bugtitherium | B. grandincisivum | | | | |
| Microbunodon | M. silistrense | | | | |
| Parabrachyodus | P. hyopotamoides | | | | |
| Sivameryx | S. palaeindicus | | | | |

===== Entelodonts =====
Entelodonts of the Chitarwata Formation
| Genus | Species | Location | Materials | Notes | Image |
|---|---|---|---|---|---|
| Paraentelodon | P. sp. | | | | |

===== Giraffid =====
Giraffids of the Chitarwata Formation
| Genus | Species | Location | Materials | Notes | Image |
|---|---|---|---|---|---|
| Progiraffa | P. exigua | | | | |

===== lophiomerycids =====
lophiomerycidaes of the Chitarwata Formation
| Genus | Species | Location | Materials | Notes | Image |
|---|---|---|---|---|---|
| Nalameryx | N. savagei | | | | |
| Nalameryx | N. sulaimani | | | | |
| Lophibaluchia | L. pilbeami | | | | |
| Lophiomeryx | L. kargilensis | | | | |

===== Ruminants =====
Ruminants of the Chitarwata Formation
| Genus | Species | Location | Materials | Notes | Image |
|---|---|---|---|---|---|
| Bugtimeryx | B. pilgrimi | | | | |
| Paalitherium | P. gurki | | | | |

==== Creodonts ====
Creodonts of the Chitarwata Formation
| Genus | Species | Location | Materials | Notes | Image |
|---|---|---|---|---|---|
| Hyainailouros | H. bugtiensis | | | A creodont. | |

==== Perissodactyl ====
===== Paraceratheriidae =====
Paraceratheriidaes of the Chitarwata Formation
| Genus | Species | Location | Materials | Notes | Image |
|---|---|---|---|---|---|
| "Buzdartherium" | "B. gulkirao" | | | | |
| Paraceratherium | P. bugtiense | Chur J2, Bugti hill | Left fragmentary maxilla with M2–M3 | A giant hornless rhinoceros | |

===== Rhinocerotidae =====
Rhinocerotidaes of the Chitarwata Formation
| Genus | Species | Location | Materials | Notes | Image |
|---|---|---|---|---|---|
| Aprotodon | A. smithwoodwardi | | | | |
| Brachypotherium | B. fatehjangense | | | | |
| Cadurcotherium | C. indicum | | Bugti Member | | |
| Epiaceratherium | E. magnum | | | | |
| Pleuroceros | P. blanfordi | | | | |

==== Marsupials ====
Marsupials of the Chitarwata Formation
| Genus | Species | Location | Materials | Notes | Image |
|---|---|---|---|---|---|
| Asiadidelphis | A. akbarbugtii | | | | |

==== Rodents ====
Rodents of the Chitarwata Formation
| Genus | Species | Location | Materials | Notes | Image |
|---|---|---|---|---|---|
| Atavocricetodon | A. paaliense | | | | |
| Baluchimys | B. barryi | | | | |
| Baluchimys | B. chaudryi, | | | | |
| Baluchimys | B. ganeshapher | | | | |
| Bugtimys | B. zafarullahi | | | | |
| Downsimys | D. margolisi | | | | |
| Fallomus | F. ginsburgi | | | | |
| Fallomus | F. quraishyi | | | | |
| Fallomus | F. razae | | | | |
| Hodsahibia | H. azrae | | | | |
| Hodsahibia | H. beamshaiensis | | | | |
| Hodsahibia | H. gracilis | | | | |
| Lindsaya | L.derabugtiensis | | | | |
| Primus | P. cheemai | | | | |
| Primus | P. microps | | | | |
| Spanocricetodon | S. sulaiman | | | | |
| Prokanisamys | P. arifi | | | | |
| Prokanisamys | P. kowalskii | | | | |
| Pseudocricetodon | P. nawabi | | | | |
| Welcommoides | W. gurki | | | | |
| Zindapiria | Z. quadricollis | | | | |

==== Primates ====
Primates of the Chitarwata Formation
| Genus | Species | Location | Materials | Notes | Image |
|---|---|---|---|---|---|
| Bugtilemur | B. mathesoni | Paali Nala C2 | A tooth (right M2), which is considered not a traceable fossil. | An extinct relative of lemurs. | |
| Bugtipithecus | B. inexpectans | Paali Nala DBC2 | A dentition, right M. | A Small-bodied amphipithecid. | |
| Guangxilemur | G. singsilai | Paali Nala C2 | A newly described upper and lower dentitions. | An adapiform primate. | |
| Phileosimias | P. brahuiorum | Paali Nala DBC2 | Several dentition from upper molar | An Eosimiidae primate. | |
| Phileosimias | P. kamali | Paali Nala DBC2 | Several dentition from upper molar | An Eosimiidae primate. | |

==== Proboscidean ====
Proboscideans of the Chitarwata Formation
| Genus | Species | Location | Materials | Notes | Image |
|---|---|---|---|---|---|
| Deinotherium | D. sp. | | | | |
| Hemimastodon | H. crepusculi | Bugti hills | A pair of upper last molars. | A very primitive proboscidean. Originally described as a large suid. | |

=== Reptiles ===
Reptiles of the Chitarwata Formation
| Genus | Species | Location | Materials | Notes | Image |
|---|---|---|---|---|---|
| "Asifcroco" | "A. retrai" | | | A crocodilian. | |
| Astorgosuchus | A. bugtiensis | | | A giant crocodilian. | |
| Pseudogavialis | P. curvirostris | | | A long-snouted crocodilian. | |
| Rhamphosuchus | P. pachyrhynchus | | | A gavialoid. | |

=== Fish ===
Fishes of the Chitarwata Formation
| Genus | Species | Location | Materials | Notes | Image |
|---|---|---|---|---|---|
| Carcharhinus | C. balochenisis | | | | |
| Carcharhinus | C. perseus | | | | |
| Cretolamna | Cretolamna twiggensis | | | | |
| Hemipristis | H. heteropleurus | | | | |
| Nebrius | N. obliquum | | | | |
