= Cleopatrodon =

Cleopatrodon Temporal range: Oligocene

Scientific classification
- Domain: Eukaryota
- Kingdom: Animalia
- Phylum: Chordata
- Class: Mammalia
- Order: †Ptolemaiida
- Family: †Ptolemaiidae
- Genus: †Cleopatrodon; Bown & Simons, 1987

Type species
- Cleopatrodon ayeshae Bown & Simons, 1987

Species
- C. ayeshae; C. robusta

Extinct family of mammals

Cleopatrodon is an extinct genus of mammals in the order Ptolemaiida. Two species are known from the Lower Oligocene Jebel Qatrani Formation of modern-day Egypt: C. ayeshae, and the more powerfully built C. robusta. The genus is named for Cleopatra VII Philopator, the last Ptolemaic Queen of Egypt.

== Features ==
Cleopatrodon, like all ptolemaiids, can most easily be identified from its unusual teeth. They were quite unspecialised at the anterior end of the mouth, with canines and incisors of a similar size, but the premolars and molars are very unusual. There are four premolars, rather than three as in most mammals, and three molars. In the lower jaw the premolars increased in size from premolar 1 to 4, and the molars decreased from 1 to 3, creating a smooth curve. The first and second premolars are large but similar to many mammal premolars, with one large cusp, although they did not seem to have been able to exert much shearing force. The third and fourth premolars are very large and have small protocones, very large paracones and large metacones. Unlike the similar genus Ptolemaia, the premolars 3 and 4 do not possess parastyles. These premolars would have had little shearing power. The molars are smaller than the premolars, but do not seem very different in structure, again seeming very specialised for some form of grinding different to the molars of herbivorous mammals. Each tooth is between 8 and 12 mm long and 10 and 15 mm wide, much shorter and wider than those of Ptolemaia. Although only the teeth and jawbone fragments of Cleopatrodon have been found, from these it is estimated to have had a skull around 15–20 cm long with a long jaw and small braincase. The whole animal was probably slightly longer than a Eurasian badger (Meles meles) but less heavily built.

== Diet ==
In all known ptolemaiid teeth, there is great wear on the surfaces of premolar 3 to molar 3, in the lower jaw, and premolar 4 to molar 1 in the upper jaw. As the other teeth in the upper jaw were greatly reduced, it is probable that Cleopatrodon and its relatives used these heavy-duty teeth for grinding against one another to crush its food. However, its teeth seemed very unsuited for grinding plant material, as they were not flat. For this reason, it has been hypothesised that it used them for cracking open shells or crushing some other resilient type of food. Because of the scarcity of cranial material and lack of post-cranial material, the nature of Cleopatrodon's and other ptolemaiids' diet remains in the realm of speculation.

== See also ==
- List of organisms named after famous people (born before 1800)
