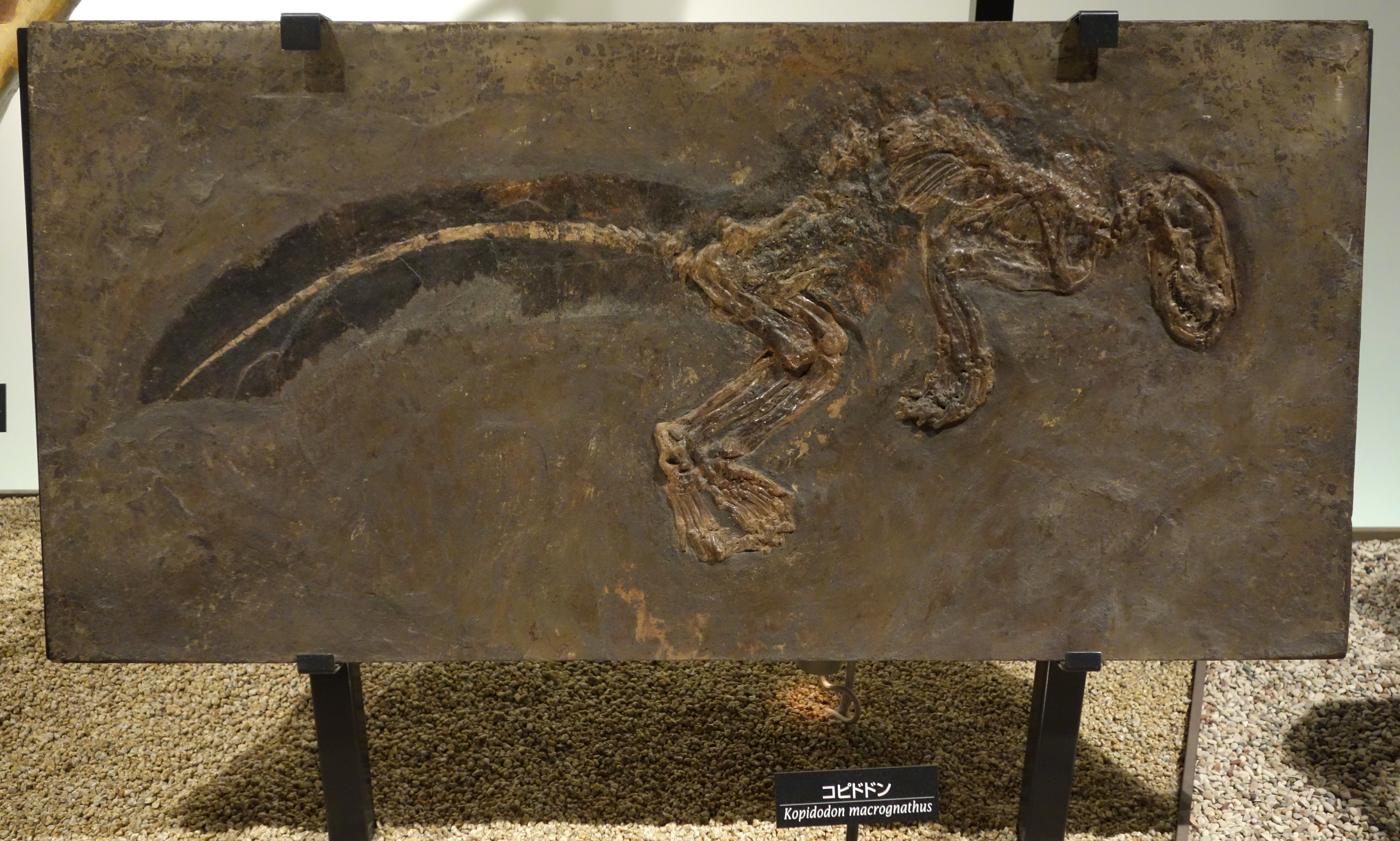
- fossil of Kopidodon macrognathus
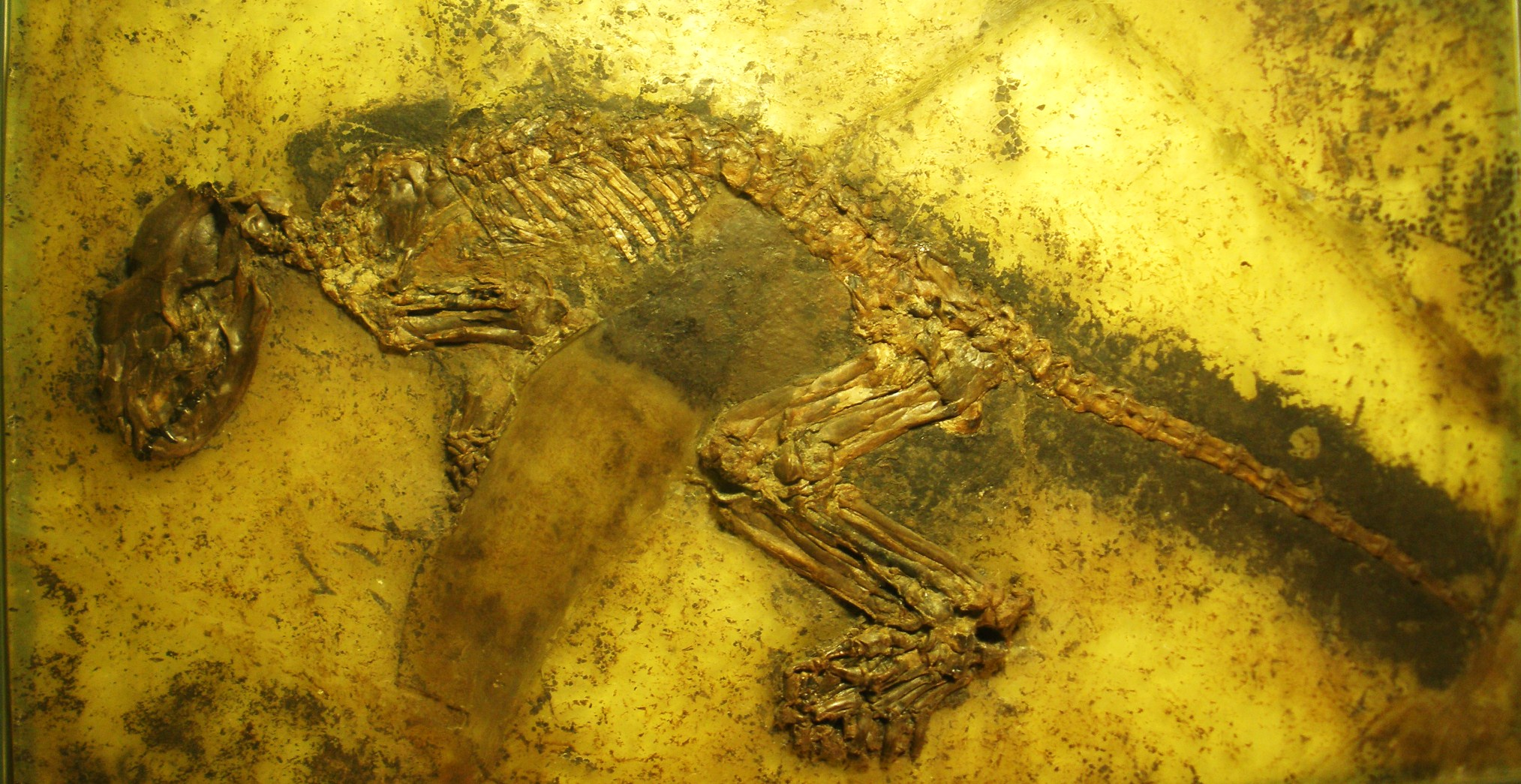
- fossil of Paroxyclaenus lemuroides

Scientific classification
- Kingdom: Animalia
- Phylum: Chordata
- Class: Mammalia
- Infraclass: Placentalia
- Mirorder: Ferae (?)
- Order: †Pantolesta
- Family: †Paroxyclaenidae; Weitzel (1933)

Type genus
- †Paroxyclaenus Teilhard de Chardin, 1922

Subgroups
- †Paroxyclaeninae; †Kopidodon; †Paravulpavoides; †Paroxyclaenus; †Pugiodens; †Sororodon; †Vulpavoides; †Merialinae; †Fratrodon; †Merialus; †Paraspaniella; †Spaniella; †Welcommoides

= Paroxyclaenidae =

Paroxyclaenidae Temporal range: 56.0–29.0 Ma early Eocene to middle Oligocene

Extinct family of mammals

Paroxyclaenidae is an extinct family of pantolestan mammals that ranges from the early Eocene to the early Oligocene. Most members of the family are found throughout Europe, though Welcommoides, the youngest and largest member, lived in what is now Pakistan. Due to their dentition and postcranial anatomy, paroxyclaenids have been suggested to have been arboreal frugivores, foraging for fruit in the trees.

Paroxyclaenid fossils are mostly diagnosed through their dentition which is generally similar to other early 'condylarths', though they are larger and with different spacing of the premolars. Similar to many, more basal Cenozoic mammals, their taxonomic placement is not well understood; Paroxyclaenids have been suggested to be anything from Carnivorans to Creodonts. Currently, Pantolesta as a whole are considered Eutherian mammals which may be a part of another problematic order, Cimolesta. Furthermore, two subfamilies are recognized within Paroxyclaenidae: Merialinae and Paroxyclaeninae.

Their extinction lines up generally with multiple climatic events during the late Eocene to the Eocene-Oligocene boundary which caused cooler and more arid conditions in Europe; these events are thought to have affected many animals inhabiting the region. The comparably more stable conditions of the Indian subcontinent allowed the family to persist much longer in this region than the paroxyclaenids of Europe.

== History and classification ==
Similar to a number of early Cenozoic mammal families, the position of Paroxyclaenidae within mammals has been unstable with some authors placing them within Carnivora, or problematic order Cimolesta, while other authors have placed them in a number of now former non-monophyletic clades such as Insectivora, Condylarthra and Creodonta. The most common placement today is within another historically enigmatic group, Pantolesta. The most current understanding of the family comes from a 1998 publication by Donald E. Russell and Marc Godinot that would not only name the oldest member of the group, Merialus martinae, but would also act as a general review of the previous fossils and describe the evolutionary history of the family. As a part of this, they would split the family into the two subfamilies: Merialinae and Paroxyclaeninae. It has been suggested that Paroxyclaenidae is the sister clade to pantolestid genus Entomodon and subfamily Dyspterninae, and also to family Pentacodontidae.

== Description ==
=== Skull ===
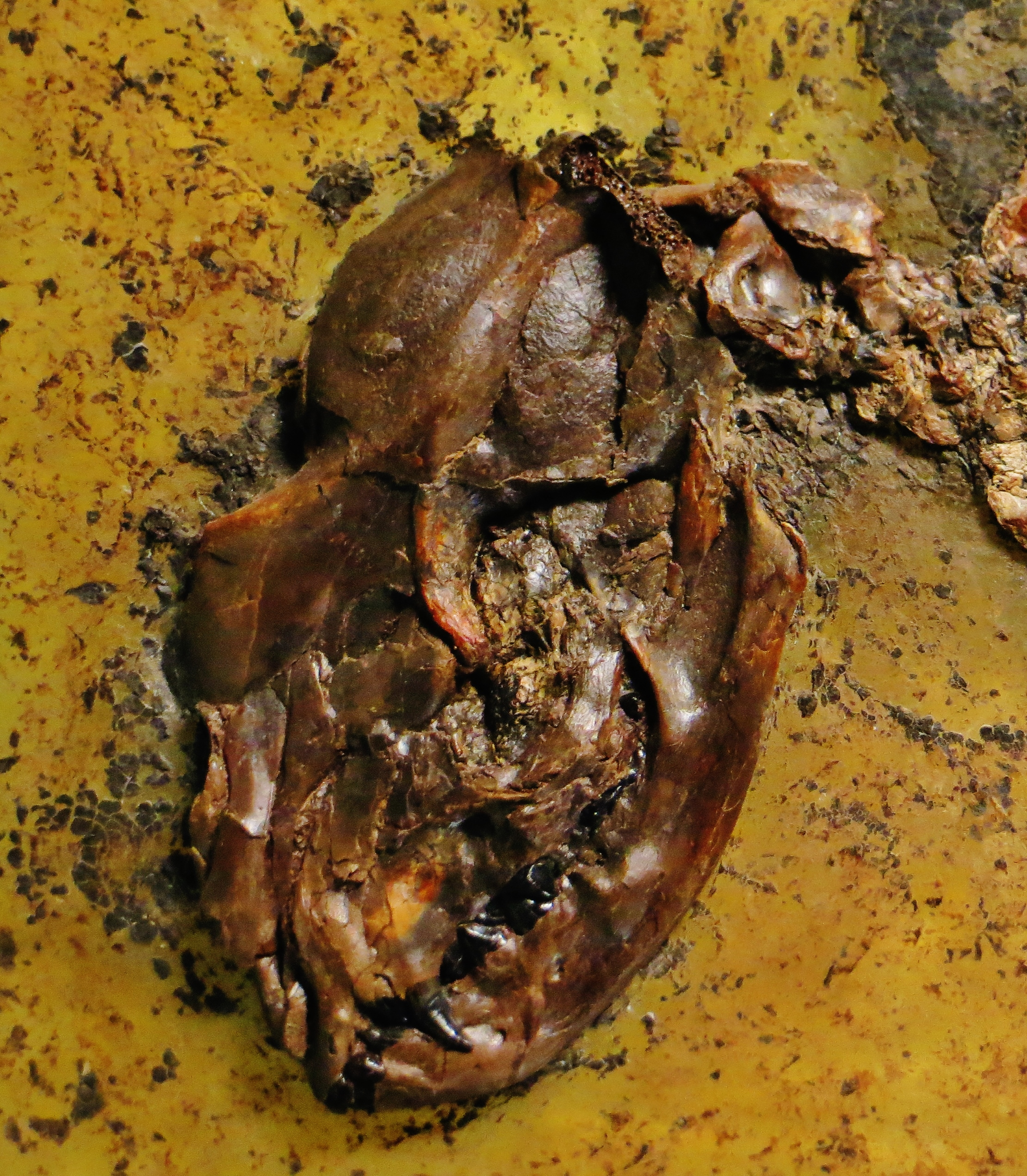
Skull of Paroxyclaenus lemuroides

The dentition of paroxyclaenids is generally similar to other earlier "condylarths" though is also very specialized. Similar to other early "condylarths", these animals had a total of four premolars and three molars. However, unlike these other groups, the posterior premolars were enlarged with them even being larger than the molars behind them. These molars would decrease in size posteriorly, making the first molar the largest in each part of the dentition. Along with this, the cheek teeth of paroxyclaenids were spaced. The enlarged canines and bunodonty of the molars were more similar to taxa such as Phenacodus. The main difference between the two subfamilies are the features of the fourth lower premolar. In Paroxyclaeninae, this tooth is larger and more molarized while the metaconid is absent in Merialinae. Another difference between the two subfamilies is the spacing between the paraconid and metaconid on the molars which are more widely spaced in Paroxyclaeninae than in Merialinae.

Outside of the dentition, the skull of most paroxyclaenids is not known, with the exception of Paroxyclaenus and Kopidodon. Both of these animals have robust skulls with wide snouts. The occipital regions of the skull were also well developed. The mandibles of the genera possessed large infraorbital foramen, which suggests that the snout most likely possessed a large amount of whiskers.

=== Postcrania ===
Similar to a majority of the skull anatomy, the postcranial features of paroxyclaenids are poorly known. Paroxyclaenus and Kopidodon are the only two members that have preserved postcrania. From what is preserved, members of the family would have had generally robust bodies with short limbs and a long tail. The forelimbs were made up of a robust humerus in combination with a mobile elbow joint, both of which would have helped the animals climb. The hindlimbs would have been plantigrade with the ankle being flexible, similar to the elbow joint. Based on soft tissue preservation, Kopidodon would have had a bushy tail.

== Evolutionary history ==
The earliest records of Paroxyclaenidae are found in the early Ypresian in southern France with genus Merialus having an estimated age of 56.0-55.2 mya. This genus, along with other members of Merialinae make up the earlier records. The other subfamily, Paroxyclaeninae, would later appear at 55.2-50.8 mya, with genus Sororodon. A wide distribution of the family, even in these earlier periods, has been noted by authors and has led to the suggestion that the family originated in the Paleocene rather than the Eocene. Even with this high diversity, it is rare to have more than one genus in a deposit. When more than one is present, the size of the genera differ by a large margin, with two genera in the Paris Basin being 1.0 kilogram (2.2 lb) and 1.5 kilograms (3.3 lb).

The older of the two subfamilies, Merialinae, would abruptly disappear in the late Ypressian, with previous authors suggesting that this was the youngest record of the subfamily. However, in 2024, Floréal Solé and coauthors described the youngest member of not only the subfamily but the entire family as a whole with the genus, Welcommoides, dating to the lower Oligocene of Pakistan. In addition, Welcommoides is the largest known member of the family with an estimated mass of 3.9–4.5 kilograms (8.6–9.9 lb). In contrast to Merialinae, Paroxyclaeninae would diversify and would have more contemporary genera. The largest members of Paroxyclaeninae generally reached the same sizes as those within Merialinae. One of these larger members, Kopidodon, has been estimated to have a mass of from 2.8–3.0 kilograms (6.2–6.6 lb) based on dentition and 3.0–5.0 kilograms (6.6–11.0 lb) based on postcranial material.

The youngest records of Paroxyclaenidae in Europe would be Paravulpavoides cooperi from the Bartonian of England with this being one of the smallest members of the family (around 1 kilogram (2.2 lb)). At the same time of the extinction of the family in Europe, a general overturn was taking place during the Bartonian–Priabonian boundary. This overturn would also affect other groups such as artiodactyls and palaeotheres that was most likely due to the increased aridity in Europe at the time. This lack of aridification on the Indian subcontinent is suggested to be the reason that the group was able to last so much longer outside of Europe. Even with this being the case, another event has been suggested to be a cause for the extinction of the group, the Grande Coupure. This event took place at the Eocene-Oligocene boundary and is generally associated with the replacement of tropical forests with more temperate ones. This event had major effects on other arboreal groups in Europe, such as primates, with the only genus being present after the event being a mouse-sized omomyid. Due to the continued tropical conditions during this time, it has been suggested that Indian subcontinent acted as a refugium for these more arboreal groups.

== Paleoecology ==
Based on more complete fossils of genera like Kopidodon, members of Paroxyclaenidae would most likely have been arboreal herbivores with some being specifically frugivorous. This has been suggested due to not only the skeletal anatomy of the genus but also the presence of gut contents in Kopidodon. Though strange for more herbivorous animals, the large canines seen on taxa such as Paroxyclaenus could have been used to pull fruit off of branches. David L Harrison would specifically make comparisons between the dentition of paroxyclaenids and those seen in fruit bats like Pteropus in his 2009 description of Paravulpavoides. Based on a trend referred to as 'Kay's threshold', it is thought that a majority of the protein in the animals' diet would have come from vegetation rather than insects. Though not a hard rule, primates under 0.5 kilograms (1.1 lb) get most of their protein from insects while those over get it from vegetation; due to the gut contents of Kopidodon, it has been suggested that this threshold could have also been seen in Paroxyclaenidae. The large premolars seen in members of the family has also been noted by multiple authors to potentially suggest a more durophagous diet than other similar groups of mammals.
