= Qarunavus =

Qarunavus Temporal range: Oligocene

Scientific classification
- Kingdom: Animalia
- Phylum: Chordata
- Class: Mammalia
- Infraclass: Placentalia
- Order: †Ptolemaiida
- Genus: †Qarunavus; Simons & Gingerich, 1974
- Species: †Q. meyeri

Binomial name
- †Qarunavus meyeri Simons & Gingerich, 1974

Extinct genus of mammals

Qarunavus is an extinct genus of mammals in the order Ptolemaiida. A single species, Qarunavus meyeri is known from the Lower Oligocene Jebel Qatrani Formation of modern-day Egypt. Described by Elwyn Simons & Philip Gingerich in 1974, the generic name is a combination of Qarun, the Arabic term for Lake Moeris, and -avus, Latin for "ancestor". The specific epithet honours Grant E. Mayer of the Yale Peabody Museum.

== Palaeobiology ==
=== Ontogeny ===
The permanent dentition of Q. meyeri erupted very late into its development; subadult specimens still have most of their deciduous dentition, with only two out of six of the permanent cheek teeth having erupted by the subadult stage despite the animal being almost as large as it would have been as an adult by that stage of its life.
