= Chacopterygus =

Chacopterygus Temporal range: Early Paleocene, 64 Ma

Scientific classification
- Kingdom: Animalia
- Phylum: Chordata
- Class: Mammalia
- Order: †Cimolesta
- Family: †Cimolestidae
- Genus: †Chacopterygus; Williamson, Weil & Standhardt, 2011

Type species
- Chacopterygus minutus Williamson, Weil & Standhardt, 2011

Extinct genus of mammals

Chacopterygus is an extinct genus of cimolestid mammal which existed in New Mexico, during the early Paleocene (middle Puercan age). Its fossils have been recovered from the Nacimiento Formation, San Juan Basin, New Mexico. It was first named by Thomas E. Williamson, Anne Weil and Barbara Standhardt in 2011 and the type species is Chacopterygus minutus.
