= Sivameryx =

Sivameryx Temporal range: Miocene

Scientific classification
- Kingdom: Animalia
- Phylum: Chordata
- Class: Mammalia
- Order: Artiodactyla
- Family: †Anthracotheriidae
- Genus: †Sivameryx; Lydekker, 1883

Synonyms
- Hyoboops Trouessart, 1905

Extinct genus of mammals

Sivameryx is an extinct genus of anthracotheriid that lived in Afro-Eurasia during the Miocene epoch.

== Distribution ==
S. africanus is known from Kenya. S. palaeindicus lived in the Chitarwata Formation of Pakistan and Khari Nadi Formation, as well as Chhasra Formation of India.
