= Scollardius =

Scollardius Temporal range: Maastrichtian

Scientific classification
- Domain: Eukaryota
- Kingdom: Animalia
- Phylum: Chordata
- Class: Mammalia
- Order: †Cimolesta
- Family: †Cimolestidae
- Genus: †Scollardius
- Species: †S. propalaeoryctes

Binomial name
- †Scollardius propalaeoryctes Fox, 2015

Extinct genus of non-placental mammals

Scollardius is an extinct genus of cimolestid that lived during the Maastrichtian stage of the Late Cretaceous epoch.

== Distribution ==
Scollardius propalaeoryctes is known from Alberta, Saskatchewan, and Montana.
