= Merialus =

Merialus Temporal range: 56.0–55.2 Ma Early Eocene

Scientific classification
- Kingdom: Animalia
- Phylum: Chordata
- Class: Mammalia
- Infraclass: Placentalia
- Order: †Pantolesta
- Family: †Paroxyclaenidae
- Subfamily: †Merialinae
- Genus: †Merialus; Russell & Godinot, 1988

Type species
- †Merialus martinae Russell & Godinot, 1988

Species
- †M. bruneti (Solé, 2019); †M. martinae (Russell & Godinot, 1988)

Extinct genus of mammals

Merialus ("animal from Meyreuil") is an extinct genus of placental mammals from subfamily Merialinae within family Paroxyclaenidae, that lived during the early Eocene in France.
