= Paraspaniella =

Paraspaniella Temporal range: 50.8–47.8 Ma Early Eocene

Scientific classification
- Kingdom: Animalia
- Phylum: Chordata
- Class: Mammalia
- Order: †Pantolesta
- Family: †Paroxyclaenidae
- Subfamily: †Merialinae
- Genus: †Paraspaniella; Solé et al., 2019

Type species
- †Paraspaniella gunnelli Solé et al., 2019

Extinct genus of mammals

Paraspaniella ("beside Spaniella") is an extinct genus of placental mammals from subfamily Merialinae within family Paroxyclaenidae, that lived during the early Eocene in France.

== Description ==
Depending on the methodology employed, the body mass estimate for Paraspaniella gunnelli ranges from 0.735 kg to 1.640 kg.
