= Didelphodus =

Didelphodus Temporal range: Eocene

Scientific classification
- Kingdom: Animalia
- Phylum: Chordata
- Class: Mammalia
- Order: †Cimolesta
- Family: †Cimolestidae
- Genus: †Didelphodus; Cope, 1882

Extinct genus of mammals

Didelphodus is an extinct genus of eutherian mammal that inhabited North America and Europe during the Eocene epoch. It was insectivorous.

== Taxonomy ==
The genus Didelphodus was erected by E. D. Cope in 1882, with the type species Deltatherium absarokae transferred to his new genus. The genus has been placed in the family Leptictidae or in the family Cimolestidae.

Species placed in the genus include:

- Didelphodus absarokae (Cope, 1881) (type species)
- Didelphodus caloris Gingerich, Folie & Smith, 2023
- Didelphodus rheos Storer, 1995
- Didelphodus serus Storer, 1984

== Palaeoecology ==
Based on its dental morphology and enamel δ^{18}O values, Didelphodus had an insectivorous diet.
