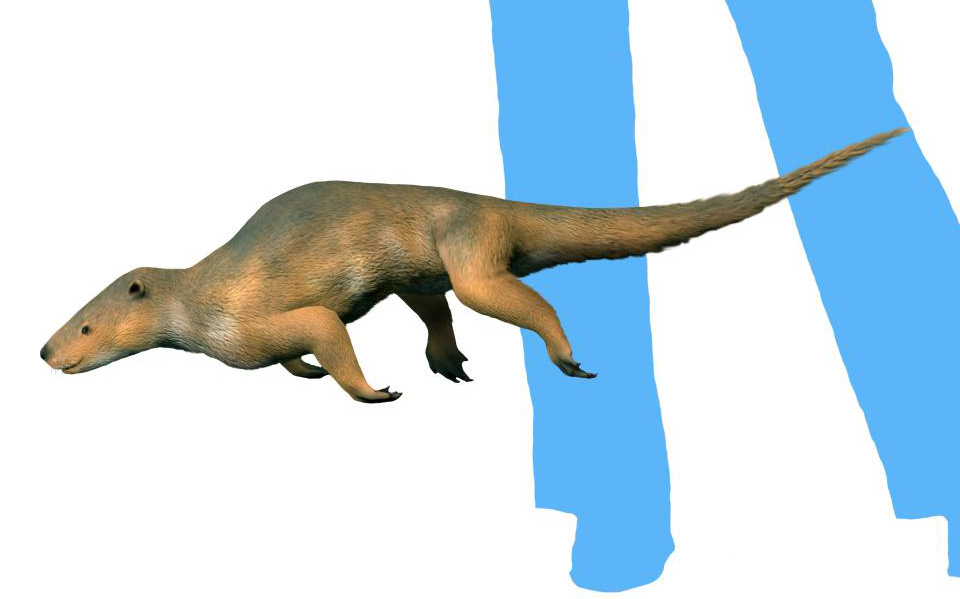
- reconstruction of Palaeosinopa didelphoides
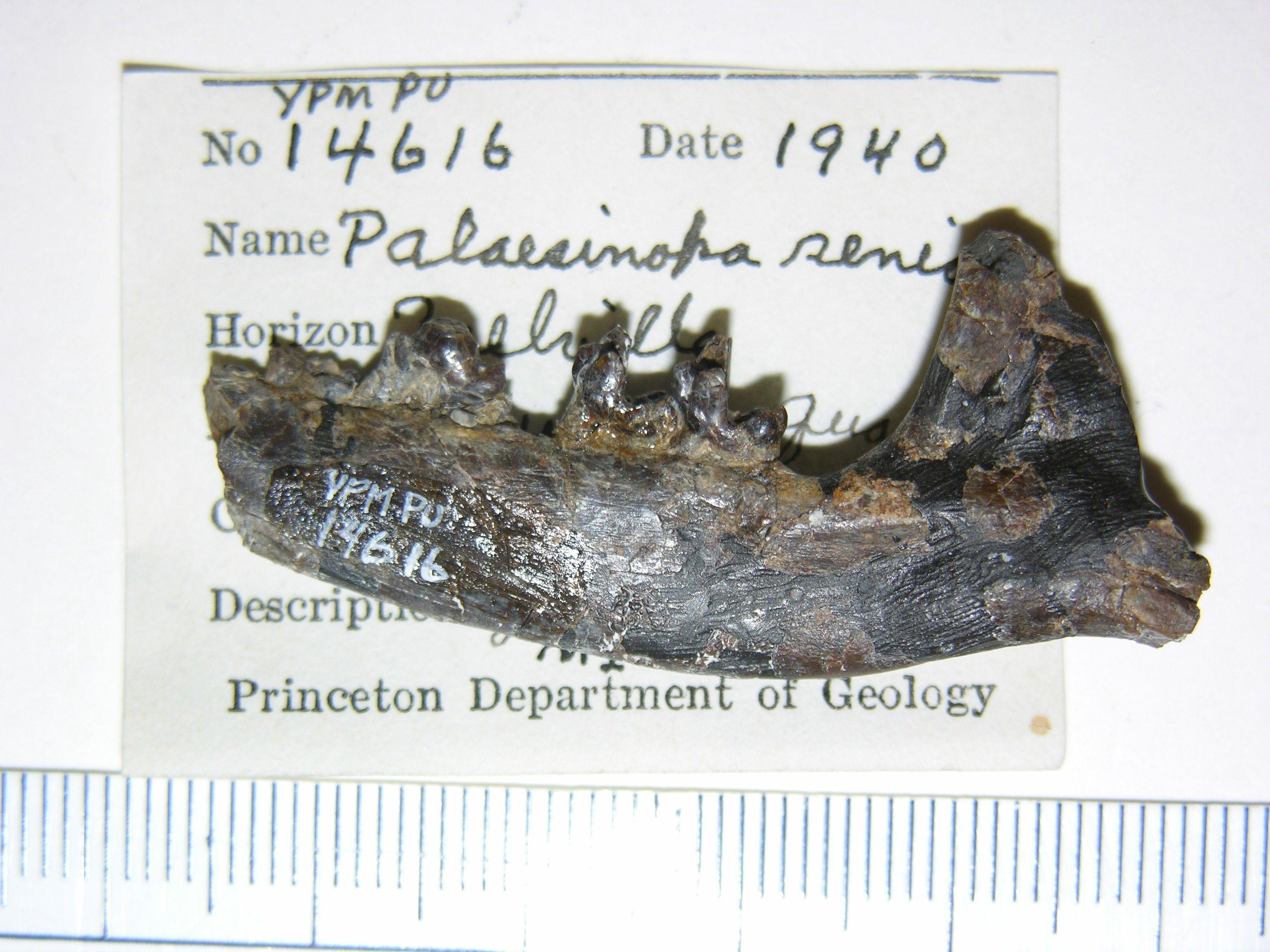
- part of lower jaw of Paleotomus senior

Scientific classification
- Kingdom: Animalia
- Phylum: Chordata
- Class: Mammalia
- Mirorder: Ferae (?)
- Order: †Pantolesta
- Family: †Pantolestidae; Cope, 1884

Type genus
- †Pantolestes Cope, 1872

Genera
- [see classification]

Synonyms
- synonyms of family: Pantolestida (Haeckel, 1895); Pantolestoidea (Cope, 1887); synonyms of subfamily: Dyspterninae: Dyspternidae (Kretzoi, 1943); Kochictidae (Kretzoi, 1943); Kochictinae (Russell & Godinot, 1988); Pantolestinae: Pantolestidae (Cope, 1884)

= Pantolestidae =

Pantolestidae Temporal range: 62.4–30.0 Ma early Paleocene to middle Oligocene

Extinct family of mammals

Pantolestidae ("all robbers") is a paraphyletic family of placental mammals from extinct order Pantolesta, that lived in North America, Asia and Europe from the early Paleocene to middle Oligocene. They first appear in North America, whence they spread to Europe and Asia.

== Description ==
The pantolestids were a small to moderate in size, omnivorous, semi-fossorial mammals. Members of this family formed grade towards families Paroxyclaenidae and Pentacodontidae, with representatives of subfamily Dyspterninae, as well genus Entomodon, were anatomically most similar to them. Oldest known pantolestids were north american genera Bessoecetor, Leptonysson and Paleotomus, while youngest known pantolestid was european genus Kochictis.

Members of subfamily Pantolestinae were semiaquatic, otter-like mammals, with a body length of about 50 centimetres (20 in) and a tail about 35 centimetres (14 in) long. The anatomy of these archaic "insectivorous" mammals is best known through well-preserved Middle Eocene specimens from genus Buxolestes found at Messel in Germany, and a few other less complete specimens, such as the Palaeosinopa found at Fossil Butte in Wyoming, estimated to have reached body weights of up to 1,400 grams (3 lb), making them relatively large early mammals. They had moderately strong canines and multi-cusped cutting teeth supported by the strong jaw muscles to which cranial cavities were adapted. This combination of dentition and muscles has been interpreted as an early adaptation to a hard diet such as clams and snails. Freely articulated forearm bones (radius and ulna) permitted their powerful forelimbs wide rotational movements, while their digits had large bony claws —indicating they could dig and build underground dens. Their powerful hind limbs could not be rotated in the same way, but the prominent transverse processes of the first tail vertebra suggest that they used their powerful tails to propel through the water like modern otters. In later pantolestins there is a prominent cranial crest combined with strong spinal processes, indicating the presence of strong neck muscles needed by swimmers that constantly hold their heads above the water surface.

== Classification ==
=== Taxonomy ===
- Family: †Pantolestidae ^{(paraphyletic family)} (Cope, 1884)
  - Genus: †Aatotomus (Rankin, 2014)
    - †Aatotomus placochton (Rankin, 2014)
  - Genus: †Amaramnis (Gazin, 1962)
    - †Amaramnis gregoryi (Gazin, 1962)
  - Genus: †Chadronia (Cook, 1954)
    - †Chadronia margaretae (Cook, 1954)
    - †Chadronia sp. (BADL 16917) (Boyd, 2014)
  - Genus: †Entomodon (Marsh, 1872)
    - †Entomodon comptus (Marsh, 1872)
  - Genus: †Paleotomus (Van Valen, 1967)
    - †Paleotomus carbonensis (Secord, 1998)
    - †Paleotomus junior (Scott, 2002)
    - †Paleotomus milleri (Rigby, 1980)
    - †Paleotomus radagasti (Van Valen, 1978)
    - †Paleotomus senior (Simpson, 1937)
  - Subfamily: †Dyspterninae (Kretzoi, 1943)
    - Genus: †Cryptopithecus (Schlosser, 1890)
      - †Cryptopithecus alcimonensis (Heissig, 1977)
      - †Cryptopithecus major (Lydekker, 1887)
      - †Cryptopithecus sideroolithicus (Schlosser, 1890)
    - Genus: †Dyspterna (Hopwood, 1927)
      - †Dyspterna woodi (Hopwood, 1927)
    - Genus: †Euhookeria (Russell & Godinot, 1988)
      - †Euhookeria hopwoodi (Cray, 1973)
    - Genus: †Galethylax (Gervais, 1850)
      - †Galethylax brainvillei (Gervais, 1850)
    - Genus: †Gobiopithecus (Dashzeveg & Russell, 1992)
      - †Gobiopithecus khan (Dashzeveg & Russell, 1992)
    - Genus: †Kiinkerishella (Gabunia & Biryukov 1978)
      - †Kiinkerishella zaisanica (Gabunia & Biryukov 1978)
    - Genus: †Kochictis (Kretzoi, 1943)
      - †Kochictis centennii (Kretzoi, 1943)
    - Genus: †Oboia (Gabunia, 1989)
      - †Oboia argillaceous (Gabunia, 1989)
  - Subfamily: †Pantolestinae (Cope, 1884)
    - Genus: †Bessoecetor (Simpson, 1936)
      - †Bessoecetor krausei (Rankin, 2014)
      - †Bessoecetor pilodontus (Secord, 2008)
      - †Bessoecetor septentrionalis (Russell, 1929)
      - †Bessoecetor thomsoni (Simpson, 1936)
    - Genus: †Bouffinomus (Mathis, 1989)
      - †Bouffinomus lamaudi (Mathis, 1989)
    - Genus: †Buxolestes (Jaegar, 1970)
      - †Buxolestes hammeli (Jaegar, 1970)
      - †Buxolestes minor (Pfretzschner, 1999)
      - †Buxolestes piscator (Koenigswald, 1980)
    - Genus: †Leptonysson (Van Valen, 1967)
      - †Leptonysson basiliscus (Van Valen, 1967)
      - †Leptonysson orthius (Secord, 2008)
    - Genus: †Pagonomus (Russell, 1964)
      - †Pagonomus dionysi (Russell, 1964)
    - Genus: †Palaeosinopa (Matthew, 1901)
      - †Palaeosinopa aestuarium (Beard & Dawson, 2009)
      - †Palaeosinopa didelphoides (Cope, 1881)
      - †Palaeosinopa dorri (Gingerich, 1980)
      - †Palaeosinopa incerta (Bown & Schankler, 1982)
      - †Palaeosinopa lacus (Gunnell, 2016)
      - †Palaeosinopa lutreola (Matthew, 1918)
      - †Palaeosinopa nunavutensis (Eberle & McKenna, 2002)
      - †Palaeosinopa osborni (Lemoine, 1891)
      - †Palaeosinopa reclusum (Rankin, 2014)
      - †Palaeosinopa russelli (Smith, 1997)
    - Genus: †Pantolestes (Cope, 1872)
      - †Pantolestes densus (Qin, 2026)
      - †Pantolestes longicaudus (Cope, 1872)
      - †Pantolestes natans (Matthew, 1909)
      - †Pantolestes sabatieri (Smith, 2001)
    - Genus: †Premontrelestes (Smith, 2001)
      - †Premontrelestes duchaussoisi (Smith, 2001)
    - Genus: †Thelysia (Gingerich, 1982)
      - †Thelysia artemia (Gingerich, 1982)
    - Genus: †Zhigdenia (Lopatin, 2006)
      - †Zhigdenia nemegetica (Lopatin, 2006)
    - Incertae sedis:
      - †Pantolestinae sp. (CMN 30947) (Eberle & McKenna, 2002)
