= Bugtitherium =

Bugtitherium Temporal range: Oligocene, 28–23 Ma

Scientific classification
- Kingdom: Animalia
- Phylum: Chordata
- Class: Mammalia
- Order: Artiodactyla
- Family: †Anthracotheriidae
- Genus: †Bugtitherium; Pilgrim, 1908
- Species: †B. grandincisivum

Binomial name
- †Bugtitherium grandincisivum Pilgrim, 1908

Extinct genus of artiodactyls

Bugtitherium is an extinct genus of anthracothere found in late Oligocene (Chattian) deposits in the Bugti Hills of Balochistan, Pakistan.

Incisor teeth that Pilgrim (1908) referred to Bugtitherium were recognized as instead belonging to the giant paraceratheriid Paraceratherium.
