= Progiraffa =

Progiraffa Temporal range: Early Miocene

Scientific classification
- Kingdom: Animalia
- Phylum: Chordata
- Class: Mammalia
- Order: Artiodactyla
- Family: Giraffidae
- Genus: †Progiraffa; Pilgrim, 1908

Extinct genus of mammals

Progiraffa is an extinct genus of giraffid artiodactyls from the Early Miocene of Pakistan. It was first named by Guy Ellcock Pilgrim in 1908. It resembled a horse more than a giraffe. It lived in an open habitat.
