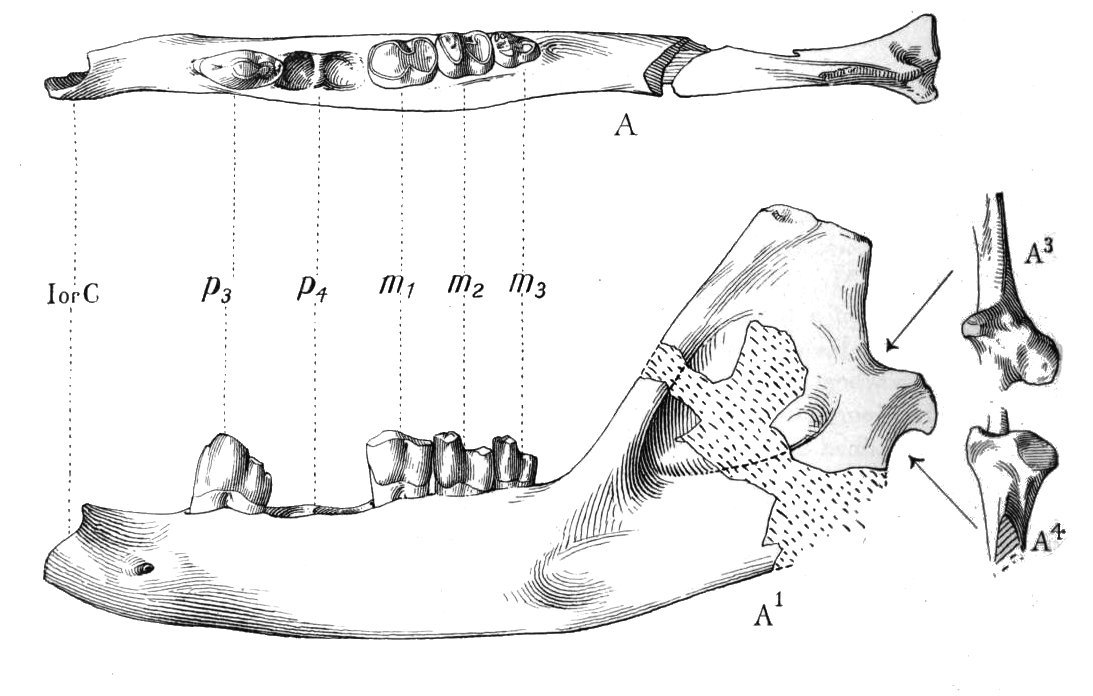
- Lower jaw of Ptolemaia lyonsi

Scientific classification
- Kingdom: Animalia
- Phylum: Chordata
- Class: Mammalia
- Order: †Ptolemaiida
- Family: †Ptolemaiidae
- Genus: †Ptolemaia; Osborn, 1908

Type species
- Ptolemaia lyonsi Osborn, 1908

Species
- P. lyonsi Osborn, 1908; P. grangeri Bown & Simons, 1987

= Ptolemaia =

Ptolemaia Temporal range: Oligocene

Genus of extinct Afrotherian mammals

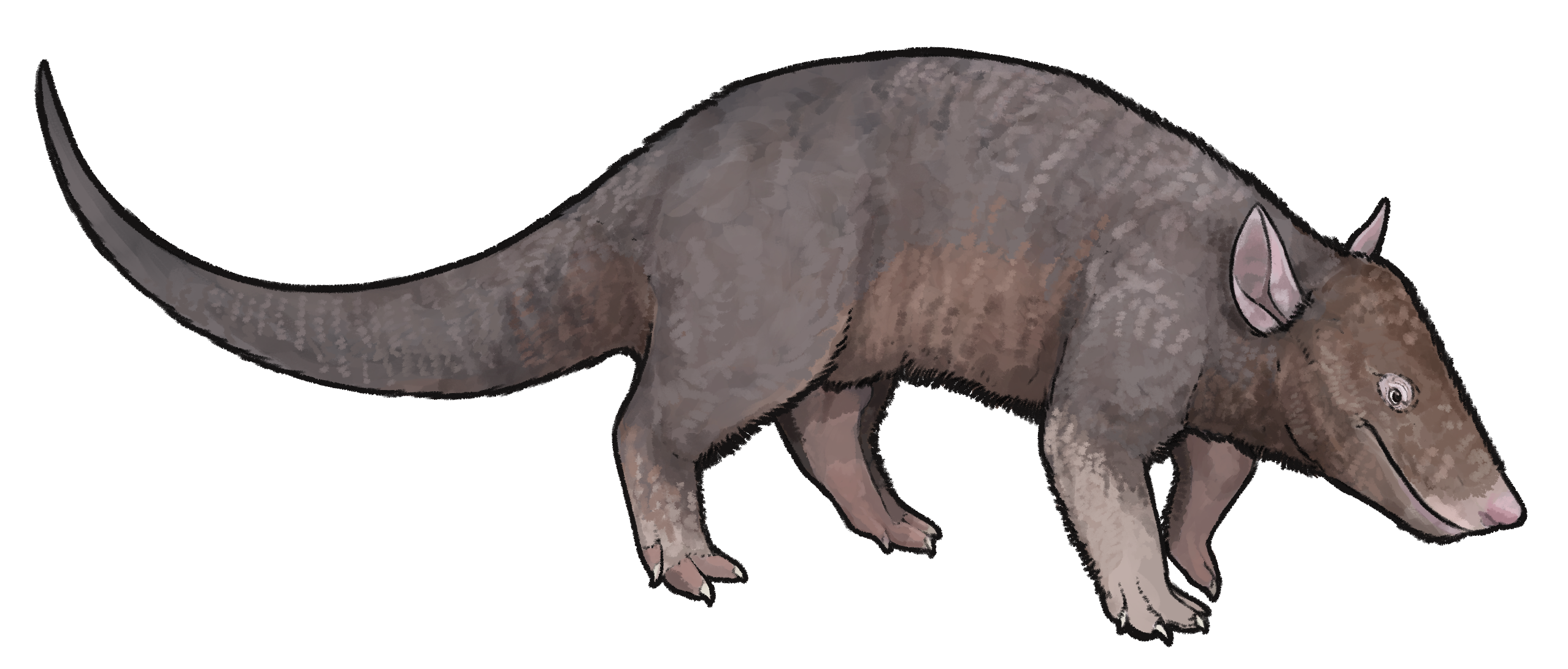
Life restoration

Ptolemaia is a genus of extinct Afrotherian mammals from the Oligocene of East Africa. The genus and type species, P. lyonsi, was described by Henry Fairfield Osborn in 1908 from the Jebel Qatrani Formation of Egypts' Fayum Depression. The genus name alludes to the Ptolemaic dynasty of Ancient Greece which ruled over the Egyptian region where Ptolemaia was discovered, while the specific epithet lyonsi honors H. G. Lyons, then director of the Egyptian Geological Survey. A second species, P. grangeri, was described in 1987, and named after the early 20th century paleontologist Walter W. Granger. Fossils of P. grangeri are also known from Kenya.
