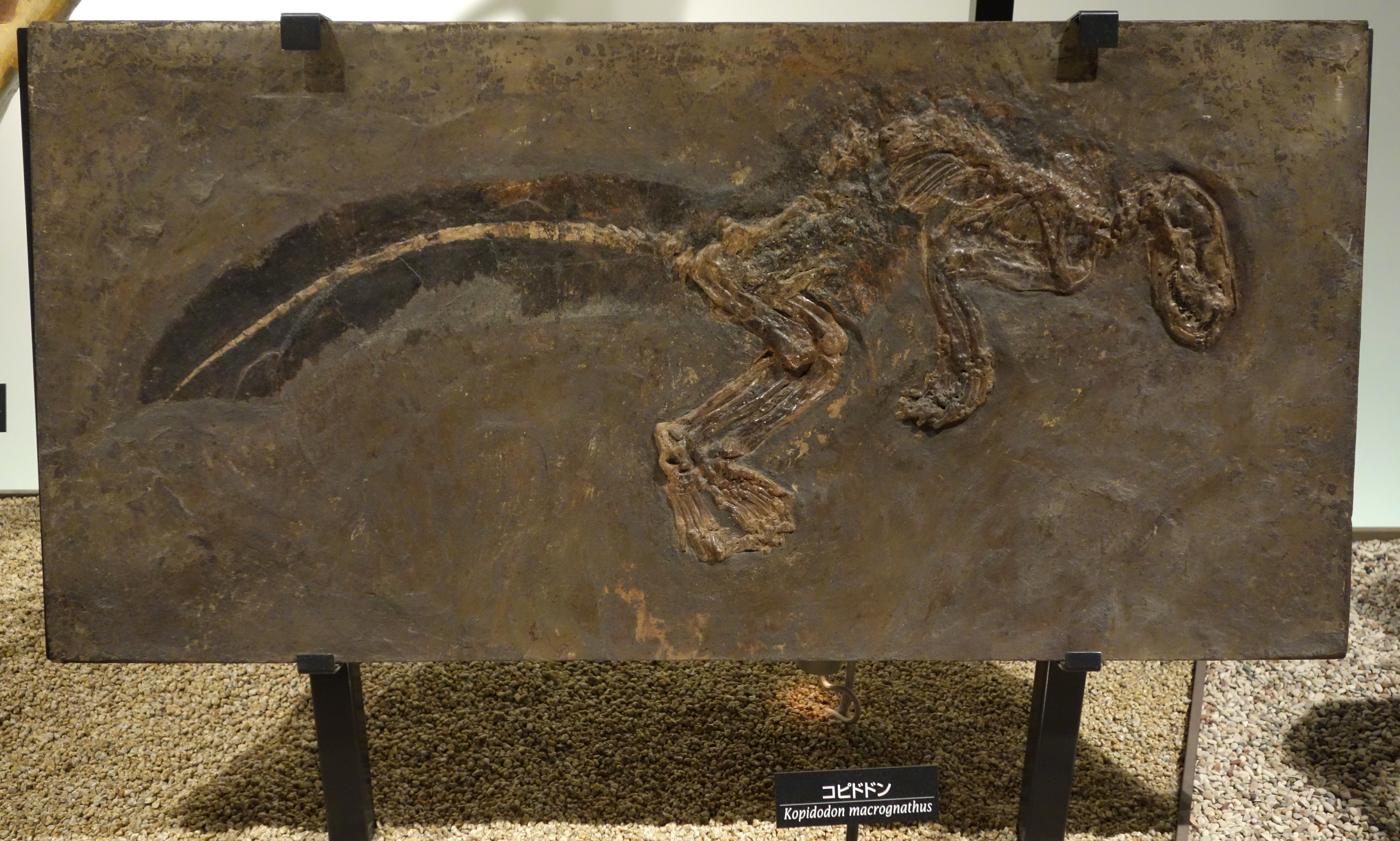
- fossil of Kopidodon macrognathus

Scientific classification
- Kingdom: Animalia
- Phylum: Chordata
- Class: Mammalia
- Infraclass: Placentalia
- Order: †Pantolesta
- Family: †Paroxyclaenidae
- Subfamily: †Paroxyclaeninae
- Genus: †Kopidodon; Weitzel, 1933

Type species
- †Kopidodon macrognathus Wittich, 1902

Synonyms
- synonyms of species: K. macrognathus: Cryptopithecus macrognathus (Wittich, 1902)

= Kopidodon =

Kopidodon Temporal range: 47.8–46.3 Ma Middle Eocene

Extinct genus of mammals

Kopidodon is an extinct genus of placental mammals from subfamily Paroxyclaeninae within family Paroxyclaenidae, that lived during the middle Eocene in Germany.

Kopidodon was one of the largest tree-dwelling mammals known from Eocene Europe, growing 115 cm (45 in) long, most of which is tail. This squirrel-like mammal sported large canine teeth, probably for defense, since its molars were adapted for chewing plants, not flesh. Its legs and claws allowed Kopidodon to scramble through the trees with the greatest of ease, much like modern-day squirrels. Its fossils were found in the Messel pit, preserving even its fur. Kopidodon had a thick bushy tail for balance.
