= Chitarwata Post =

Place in Punjab, Pakistan

Coordinates: 31.056102°N 70.245557°E

Chitarwata Post is a British era post of the Border military police in the Sulaiman Mountains in Punjab, Pakistan. It is located at the confluence of lar and bar mountain streams which form Vehowa river downstream of Chitarwata. Chitarwata Post is also the place where boundaries of three provinces meet, Punjab, Balochistan and the Khyber Pakhtunkhwa.
