= Kelba quadeemae =

Kelba quadeemae Temporal range: Early Miocene-Middle Miocene 22–12.5 Ma

Scientific classification
- Kingdom: Animalia
- Phylum: Chordata
- Class: Mammalia
- Order: †Ptolemaiida
- Family: †Kelbidae; Cote et al., 2007
- Genus: †Kelba; Savage, 1965
- Species: †K. quadeemae

Binomial name
- †Kelba quadeemae Savage, 1965

Extinct species of mammal

Kelba quadeemae is an extinct species of ptolemaiidan mammal, the sole species of the family Kelbidae, known from the Lower Miocene of East Africa. The genus name Kelba derives from the Arabic الكلب (pronounced kalb or kelb) meaning "dog", and the specific name quadeemae from the Arabic quadeem, meaning "ancient". Kelba is only known from a partial skull and teeth, but estimated to have been (around 15 kg), similar in size to a coyote but more heavily built. The teeth are rather unspecialized, suggesting a wide and varied diet, and show wear suggesting its diet included abrasive material.
