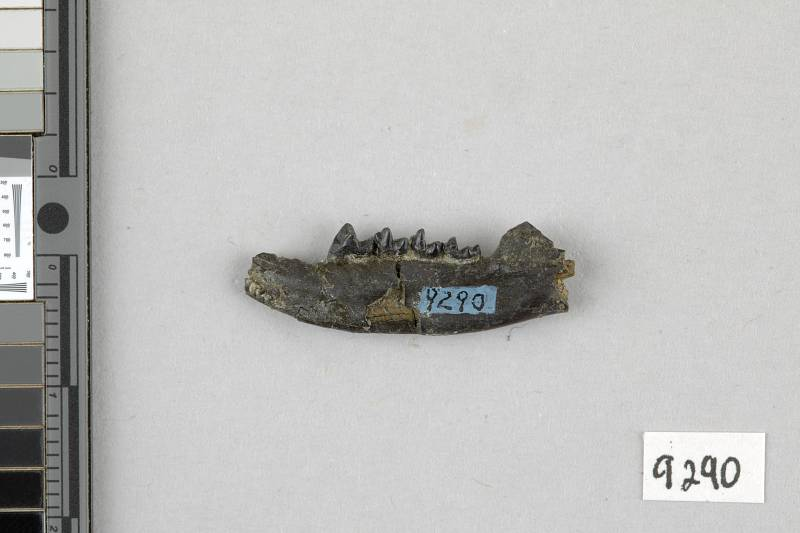
- mandibula of Aphronorus fraudator
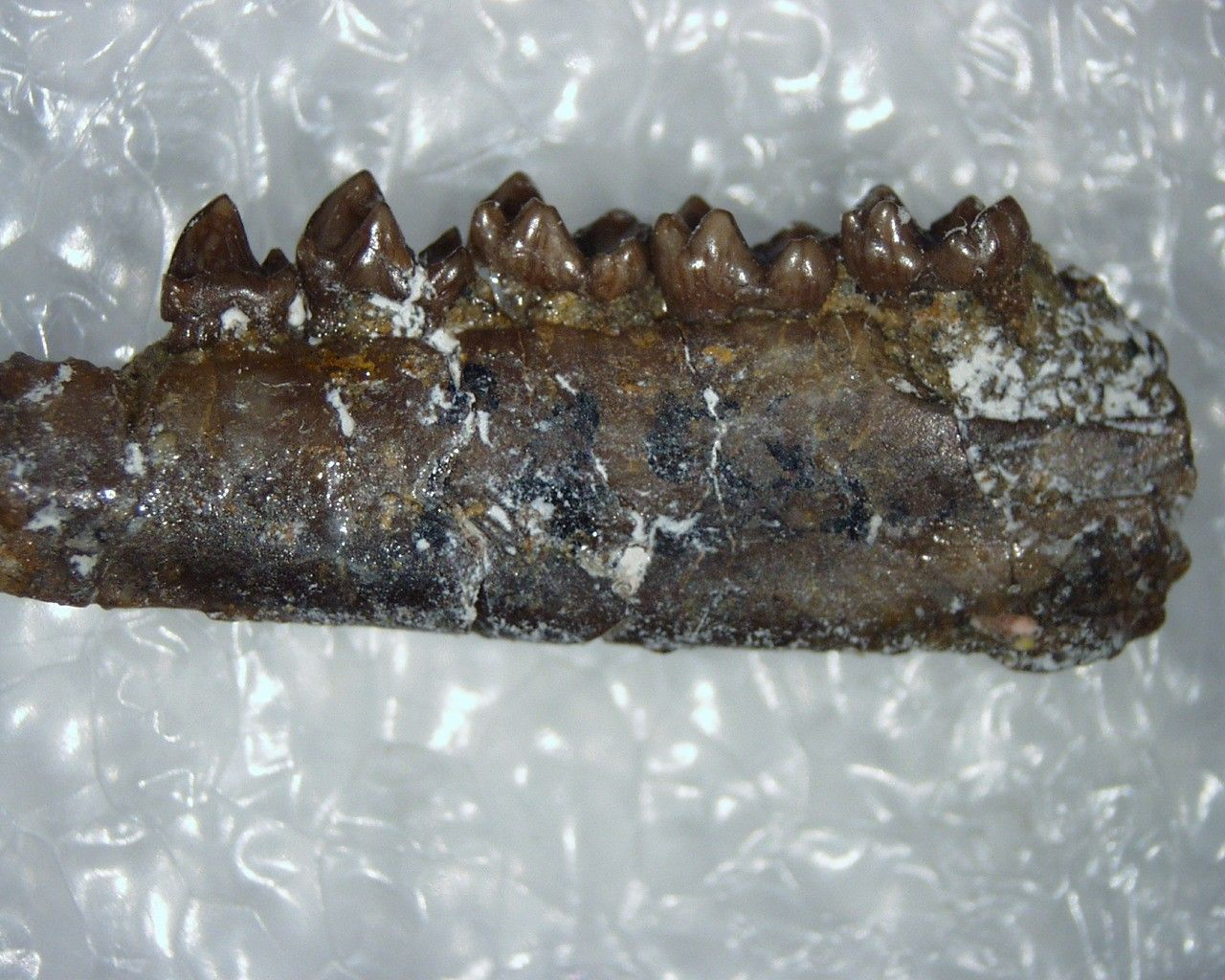
- mandibula of Bisonalveus browni

Scientific classification
- Kingdom: Animalia
- Phylum: Chordata
- Class: Mammalia
- Mirorder: Ferae (?)
- Order: †Pantolesta
- Family: †Pentacodontidae; Simpson, 1937

Type genus
- †Pentacodon Scott, 1892

Genera
- †Aphronorus; †Bisonalveus; †Coriphagus; †Eurolestes; †Pentacodon

Synonyms
- Pentacodontinae (Simpson, 1937)

= Pentacodontidae =

Pentacodontidae Temporal range: 63.8–50.5 Ma early to late Paleocene

Extinct family of mammals

Pentacodontidae ("teeth with five points") is an extinct family of placental mammals from extinct order Pantolesta, that lived in North America and Europe from the early to late Paleocene.

== Classification and phylogeny ==
=== Taxonomy ===
- Family: †Pentacodontidae (Simpson, 1937)
  - Genus: †Aphronorus (Simpson, 1935)
    - †Aphronorus bearspawensis (Scott, 2013)
    - †Aphronorus fraudator (Simpson, 1935)
    - †Aphronorus orieli (Gazin, 1969)
    - †Aphronorus ratatoski (Winterfeld, 1982)
    - †Aphronorus simpsoni (Gazin, 1938)
  - Genus: †Bisonalveus (Gazin, 1956)
    - †Bisonalveus browni (Gazin, 1956)
    - †Bisonalveus gracilis (Fox & Scott, 2020)
    - †Bisonalveus holtzmani (Gingerich, 1983)
  - Genus: †Coriphagus (Douglass, 1908)
    - †Coriphagus encinensis (Matthew & Granger, 1921)
    - †Coriphagus montanus (Douglass, 1908)
  - Genus: †Eurolestes (De Bast & Smith, 2016)
    - †Eurolestes dupuisi (De Bast & Smith, 2016)
  - Genus: †Pentacodon (Scott, 1892)
    - †Pentacodon inversus (Cope, 1888)
    - †Pentacodon occultus (Matthew, 1937)
