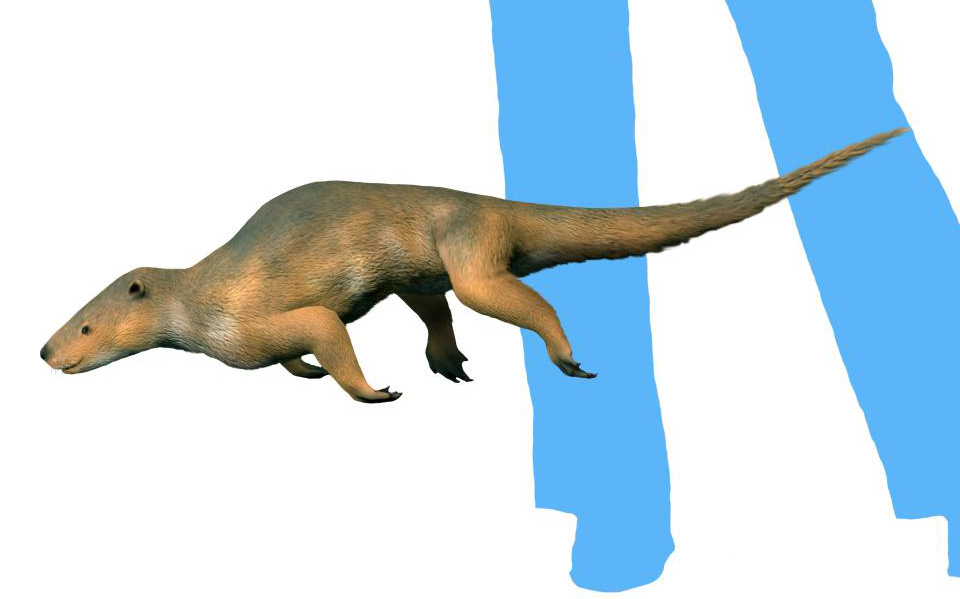
- reconstruction of Palaeosinopa didelphoides
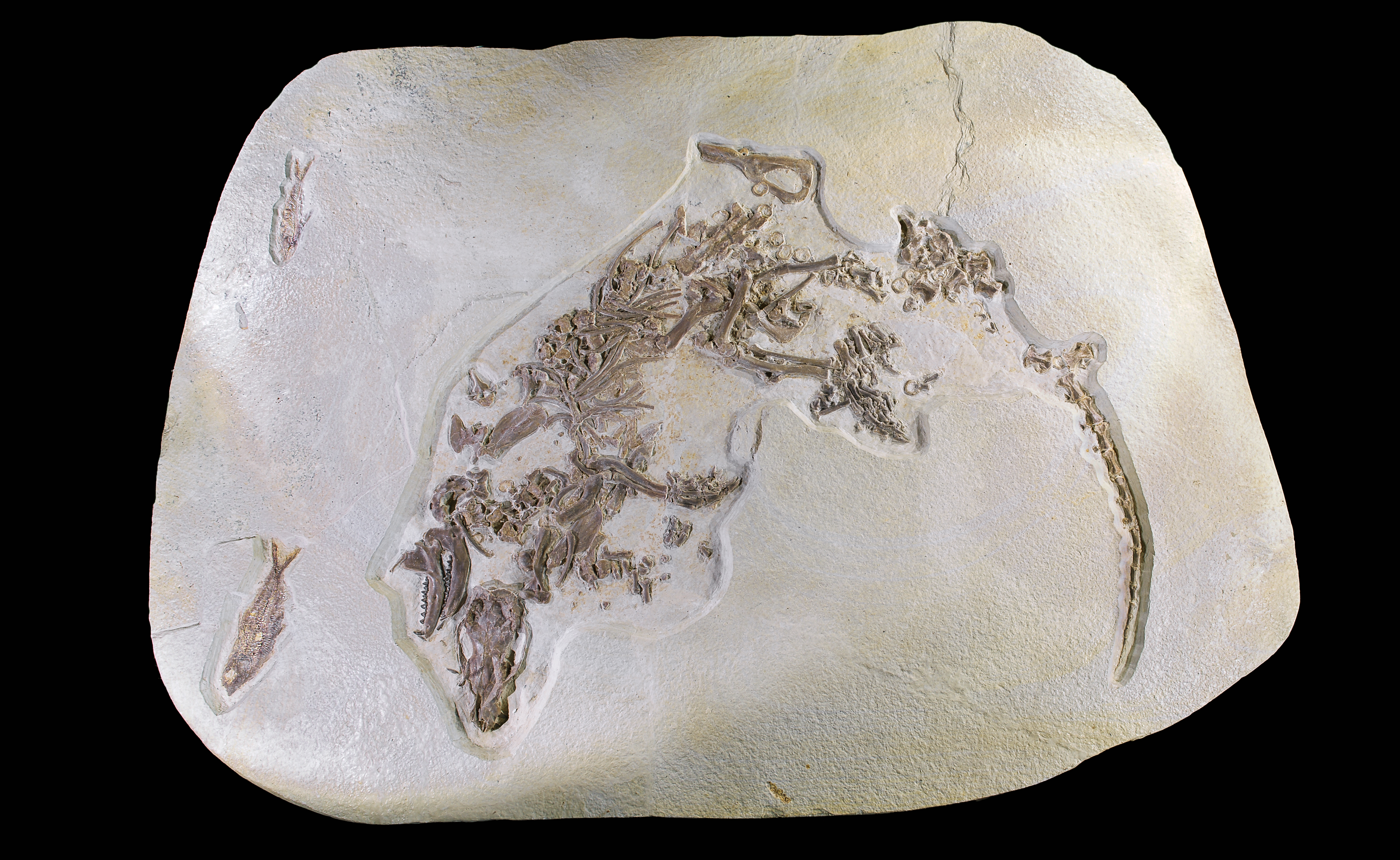
- fossil of Palaeosinopa didelphoides with fossils of fish species Knightia alta from Wyoming

Scientific classification
- Kingdom: Animalia
- Phylum: Chordata
- Class: Mammalia
- Order: †Pantolesta
- Family: †Pantolestidae
- Subfamily: †Pantolestinae
- Genus: †Palaeosinopa; Matthew, 1901

Type species
- †Palaeosinopa didelphoides Cope, 1881

Species
- †P. aestuarium (Beard & Dawson, 2009); †P. didelphoides (Cope, 1881); †P. dorri (Gingerich, 1980); †P. incerta (Bown & Schankler, 1982); †P. lacus (Gunnell, 2016); †P. lutreola (Matthew, 1918); †P. nunavutensis (Eberle & McKenna, 2002); †P. osborni (Lemoine, 1891); †P. reclusum (Rankin, 2014); †P. russelli (Smith, 1997)

Synonyms
- synonyms of species: P. didelphoides: Ictops didelphoides (Cope, 1881); Palaeosinopa veterrima (Matthew, 1901)

= Palaeosinopa =

Palaeosinopa Temporal range: 58.9–50.0 Ma late Paleocene to early Eocene

Extinct genus of mammals

Palaeosinopa ("ancient Sinopa") is an extinct genus of semi-aquatic mammals belonging to the subfamily Pantolestinae within family Pantolestidae. Species in this genus lived from the late Paleocene to early Eocene in North America and Europe. Their diet consisted of other aquatic life forms.

== Description ==
Palaeosinopa was a medium-sized, semi-aquatic mammal structurally convergent with modern otters. Based on an exceptionally complete, articulated skeleton discovered in the Eocene-aged Green River Formation of Wyoming, P.didelphoides measured approximately 1 meter (3.3 ft) in total length from the snout to the tip of the tail and is estimated to have weighed roughly 5 kilograms (11 lbs).
