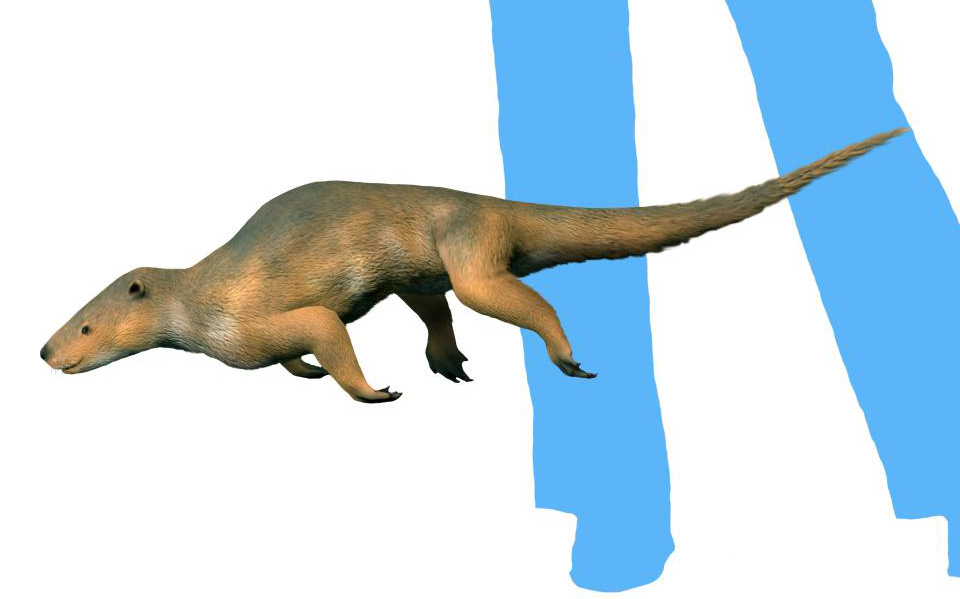
- restoration of Palaeosinopa didelphoides
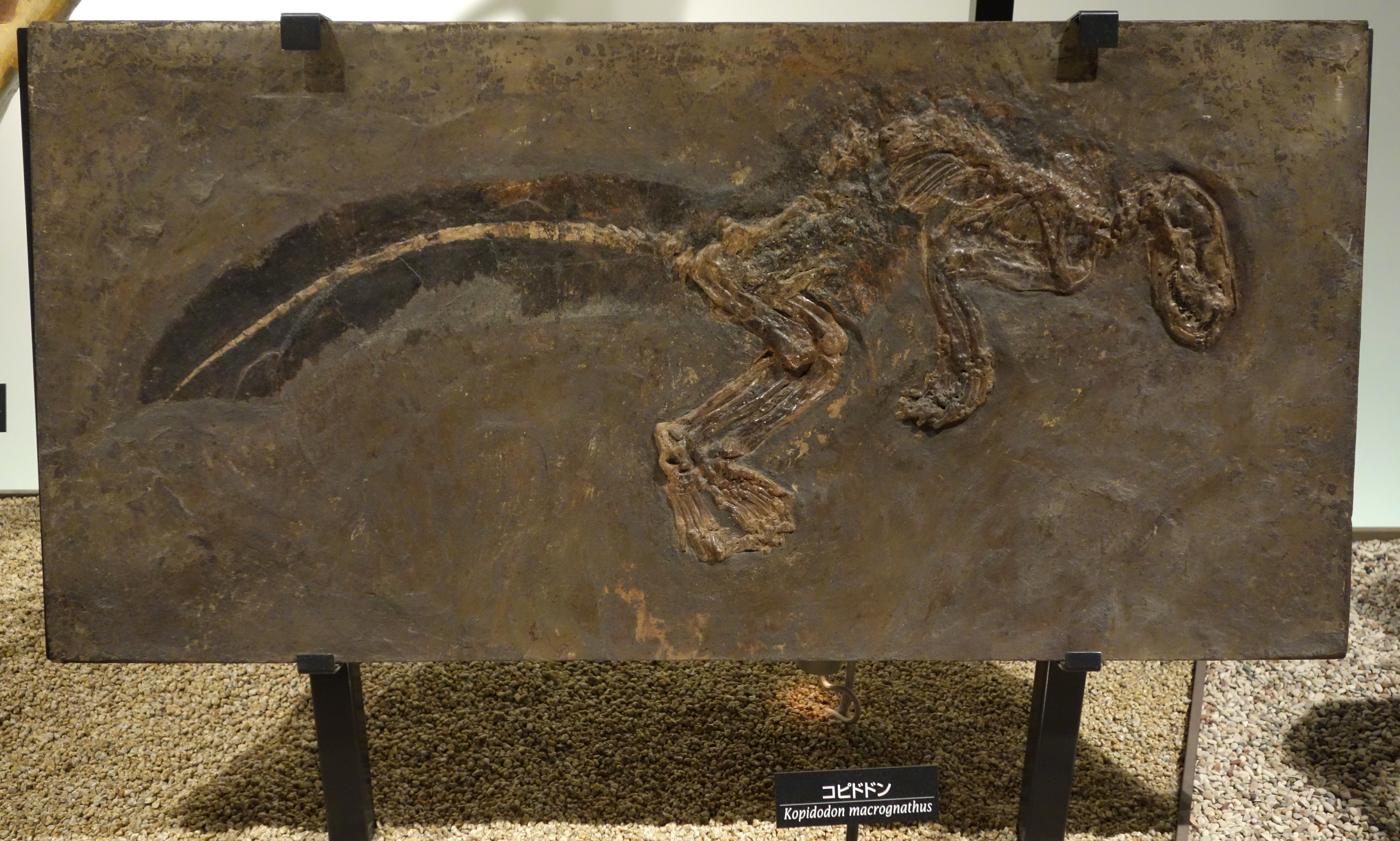
- fossil of Kopidodon macrognathus

Scientific classification
- Kingdom: Animalia
- Phylum: Chordata
- Class: Mammalia
- Infraclass: Placentalia
- Grandorder: Ferungulata
- Mirorder: Ferae (?)
- Order: †Pantolesta; McKenna, 1975

Families
- †Pantolestidae ^{(paraphyletic family)}; †Paroxyclaenidae; †Pentacodontidae

= Pantolesta =

Pantolesta Temporal range: 63.8–29.0 Ma early Paleocene to middle Oligocene

Extinct order of mammals

Pantolesta ("all robbers") is an extinct order of placental mammals that lived in North America, Asia and Europe from the early Paleocene to middle Oligocene. They are recognized as close relatives of clade Pholidotamorpha (pangolins and palaeanodonts), based on their dental and postcranial similarities, and semi-fossorial adaptations.

== Classification and phylogeny ==
=== Taxonomy ===
- Order: †Pantolesta (McKenna, 1975)
  - Family: †Pantolestidae ^{(paraphyletic family)} (Cope, 1884)
  - Family: †Paroxyclaenidae (Weitzel, 1933)
  - Family: †Pentacodontidae (Simpson, 1937)

=== Phylogeny ===
Based on Rose (2000.) study:

- - - Scandentia
      - Tupaiidae
        Tupaia
  - - - †Leptictida
        †Leptictidae
    - - Erinaceomorpha
      - - "Pholidota"
          †Palaeanodonta
        - †Pantolesta
          †Pantolestidae

Based on Rose (2005.) study:

- - - †Ernanodonta
      †Ernanodontidae
  - - †Pantolesta
      †Pantolestidae
  - - †Escavadodontidae
    - - †Epoicotheriidae
      - - †Metacheiromyidae
        - ?
          †Afredentata
        - Pholidota

Based on Rose (2008.) study:

- - †Pantolesta
    †Pantolestidae
  - †Palaeanodonta
    - †Escavadodontidae
    - - †Amelotabes
      - - - - - - †Epoicotherium
                - †Xenocranium
              - †Tetrapassalus
            - †Dipassalus
          - †Alocodontulum
          - †Pentapassalus
          - †Tubulodon
        - ?
          †Arcticanodon
        - †Metacheiromyidae
