= Desmatotitan =

Desmatotitan Temporal range: Middle Eocene (Irdinmanhan), 47.8–42.7 Ma
- Type jaw of D. tukhumensis (AMNH 21606)

Scientific classification
- Kingdom: Animalia
- Phylum: Chordata
- Class: Mammalia
- Order: Perissodactyla
- Family: †Brontotheriidae
- Subfamily: †Brontotheriinae
- Genus: †Desmatotitan; Granger & Gregory, 1943
- Species: †D. tukhumensis

Binomial name
- †Desmatotitan tukhumensis Granger & Gregory, 1943

Extinct genus of mammals

Desmatotitan (lit. 'linked titan') is an extinct genus of brontothere that lived in East Asia during the Middle Eocene, in the Irdinmanhan land mammal age. The genus contains a single species, D. tukhumensis, known from a single mandible found in the Ulan Shireh Formation of Inner Mongolia, China.

Desmatotitan was an intermediate-sized brontothere, estimated to have weighed 896.7 kilograms (1,977 lb). The genus is distinguished by a unique combination of features in its lower dentition, being overall similar to Mesatirhinus but with some more derived characteristics in its premolars and molars.

== Research history ==
Desmatotitan tukhumensis was described by Walter W. Granger and William King Gregory in 1943, based on a partial mandible (AMNH 21606) found in the Ulan Shireh Formation of Inner Mongolia, China, four miles north of the Tukhum Lamasery. Granger and Gregory believed that AMNH 21606 represented an intermediate form between Telmatherium and Metatelmatherium, which the name Desmatotitan alludes to. They noted several similarities to Metatelmatherium, which they presumed was Desmatotherium's closest relative, but distinguished Desmatotherium on the genus level by its relative large and spreading incisors, a smaller and more slender jaw, relatively larger third and fourth pairs of premolars, a wide talonid on the third pair of premolars, a shorter and wider third molar, and heavy external cingula on the third pair of premolars to third pair of molars.

In a 2008 revision, Matthew C. Mihlbachler noted that Granger and Gregory's assumption that Desmatotitan was a close relative of Metatelmatherium was difficult to confirm based only on the mandible. Mihlbachler instead found AMNH 21606 to be most similar to fossil jaws of Mesatirhinus, particularly in its incisors being less subcaniniform than in Metatelmatherium. The broad premolars and very rounded crescents of the molars of Desmatotitan do not match Mesatirhinus, and these features are instead similar to Microtitan. Desmatotitan differs from Microtitan in its less elongated third pair of molars, wider premolars, larger body size, and the presence of a diastema (gap between teeth) between the first and second pairs of premolars. Due to the unique combination of dental characteristics, Mihlbachler recognized Desmatotitan as a valid genus, though he noted that more complete fossils were needed in order to compile a more thorough diagnosis of the species and genus.

== Description ==
Desmatotitan was an intermediate-sized brontothere. In 2023, Oscar Sanisidro, Mihlbachler, and Juan L. Cantalapiedra estimated D. tukhumensis to have weighed 896.7 kilograms (1,977 lb).

Desmatotitan had the lower dental formula 3.1.4.3. AMNH 21606 is quite thin, and the roots of the cheek teeth are exposed. This might reflect the animal being of poor health near the time of its death, and not the anatomy of a healthy individual. The incisors of Desmatotitan were large and were all roughly equal in size. The incisor row formed a strong arch in front of the canines. The tooth crowns of the first and second pair of incisors were semispatulate in shape, while the tooth crowns of the third pair were more subcaniniform. The canines of Desmatotherium were large and wide. There were no diastemata between any of the pairs of incisors, or between the incisors and the canines, but there was a quite long diastema between the canines and premolars. There was also a short diastema between the first and second pairs of premolars. There were no metaconids on the first or second pair of premolars, but there were on the fourth pair. The premolars were relatively wide. The third pair of molars were elongated, proprotionally similar to the same pair of teeth in Sthenodectes, and proprortionally longer than in primitive brontotheres such as Palaeosyops or Bunobrontops.

== Classification ==
In 1943, Granger and Gregory classified Desmatotitan in the subfamily "Metatelmatheriinae", alongside Metatelmatherium and Hyotitan. In an evolutionary tree, Granger and Gregory proposed that Desmatotitan descended from "Telmatherium ultimum" and was ancestral to Metatelmatherium. Modern revisions consider T. ultimum to be Metatelmatherium (M. ultimum), and other species of Metatelmatherium to be synonyms of M. ultimum. In 1997, Malcolm McKenna and Susan K. Bell did not retain "Metatelmatheriinae", and instead placed Desmatotitan and most other "metatelmatheriines" in the subfamily "Telmatheriinae".

Mihlbachler established a new internal taxonomy of brontotheres in 2008, and recovered Desmatotitan as significantly more basal than Metatelmatherium. Desmatotitan is generally recovered as the sister taxon of Acrotitan, with which it shares some unique featurs, such as a long and narrow mandibular symphysis and a slanted first lower premolar. The cladogram below shows the strict reduced consensus from a 2021 study by Mihlbachler and Donald Prothero:

- Brontotheriidae
  - - Eotitanops
    - "cf. Eotitanops" (Eberle, 2006)
    - Eotitanops pakistanensis
    - - Palaeosyops
      - Brontotheriinae
        - Bunobrontops savagei
        - - Balochititanops haqi
          - - Mesatirhinus junius
            - - Dolichorhinus hyognathus
              - - Desmatotitan tukhumensis
                - Acrotitan ulanshirehensis
              - - Sphenocoelus uintensis
                - Brontotheriini
                  ⊞
                  - - Microtitan mongoliensis
                    - Rhadinorhinina
                      - Fossendorhinus diploconus
                      - - Metarhinus pater
                        - Metarhinus fluviatilis
                        - Metarhinus abbotti
                  - - Sthenodectes incisivum
                    - - Telmatherium validus
                      - Qufutitan zhoui
                      - - Wickia brevirhinus
                        - Xylotitan cenosus
                        - Metatelmatherium ultimum
                      - - Epimanteoceras formosus
                        - - Brontotheriina
                            - Epimanteoceras mae
                            - - Protitan grangeri
                              - Protitan minor
                            - - Rhinotitan kaiseni
                              - - Rhinotitan andrewsi
                                - Brontotheriita
                                  - Parabrontops gobiensis
                                  - Eubrontotherium clarnoensis
                                  - Parvicornus occidentalis
                                  - - Protitanops curryi
                                    - - Dianotitan lunanensis
                                      - - Duchesneodus uintensis
                                        - - Megacerops coloradensis
                                          - Megacerops kuwagatarhinus
                                - Protitanotherium emarginatum
                                - Pachytitan ajax
                                - - Diplacodon elatus
                                  - Diplacodon gigan
                                - Embolotheriita
                                  - - Aktautitan hippopotamopus
                                    - - Pollyosbornia altidens
                                      - Gnathotitan berkeyi
                                  - - Pygmaetitan panxianensis
                                    - - Brachydiastematherium transylvanicum
                                      - Metatitan khaitshinus
                                      - - Metatitan primus
                                        - Metatitan relictus
                                    - - Nasamplus progressus
                                      - - Protembolotherium efremovi
                                        - - Embolotherium andrewsi
                                          - Embolotherium grangeri
                  ⊟

== Paleoecology ==
Desmatotitan lived during the Irdinmanhan land mammal age. The paleoenvironment of the Ulan Shireh Formation is believed to have consisted of warm, forest-dominated habitats. Nearly half of the known mammal species from the Ulan Shireh Formation are perissodactyls. D. tukhumensis shared its environment with several other brontotheres, including Acrotitan, Epimanteoceras, Microtitan, and Protitan. Other perissodactyls included both tapiroids (Breviodon, Lophialetes, Simplaletes, Teleolophus, and Zhongjianoletes) and rhinocerotoids (Forstercooperia, Triplopus, and Lushiamynodon). Artiodactyls were represented by the choeropotamid Gobihyus, and smaller mammals included rodents, lagomorphs, and didymoconids.
