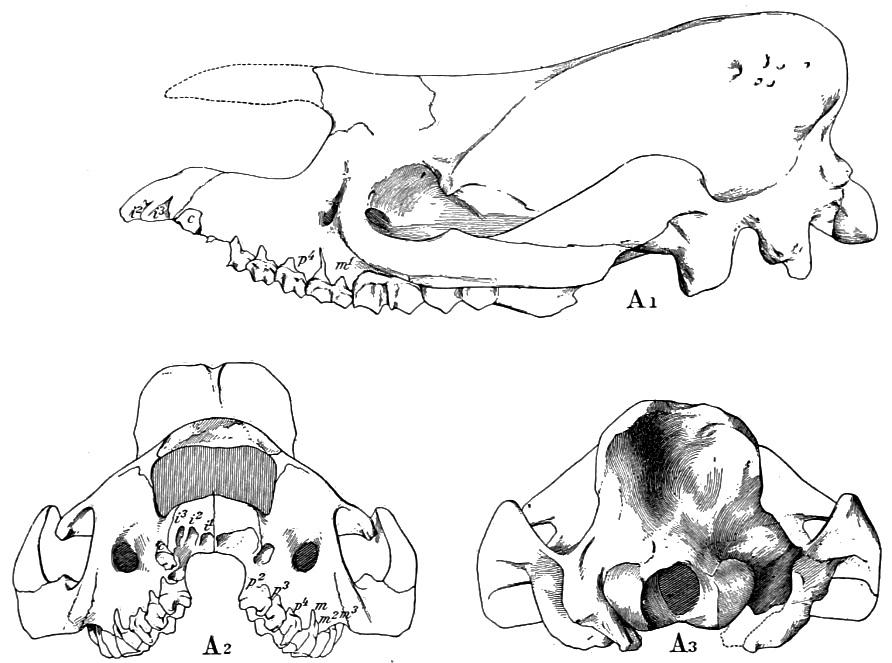
- Skull of Fossendorhinus

Scientific classification
- Kingdom: Animalia
- Phylum: Chordata
- Class: Mammalia
- Order: Perissodactyla
- Family: †Brontotheriidae
- Subfamily: †Brontotheriinae
- Tribe: †Brontotheriini
- Subtribe: †Rhadinorhinina; Osborn, 1929

Genera
- †Fossendorhinus; †Metarhinus

= Rhadinorhinina =

Rhadinorhines Temporal range: Middle Eocene, 46.3–42.8 Ma (Note: The fossil range follows North American land mammal age correlations (with precise dates) from Hodnett et al. (2022).)

Extinct subtribe of mammals

Rhadinorhines (subtribe Rhadinorhinina) were a group, or clade, of derived (advanced) brontotheres. Rhadinorhines were small to intermediate-sized brontotheres, known only from the Middle Eocene (Uintan) of western North America.

== Description ==
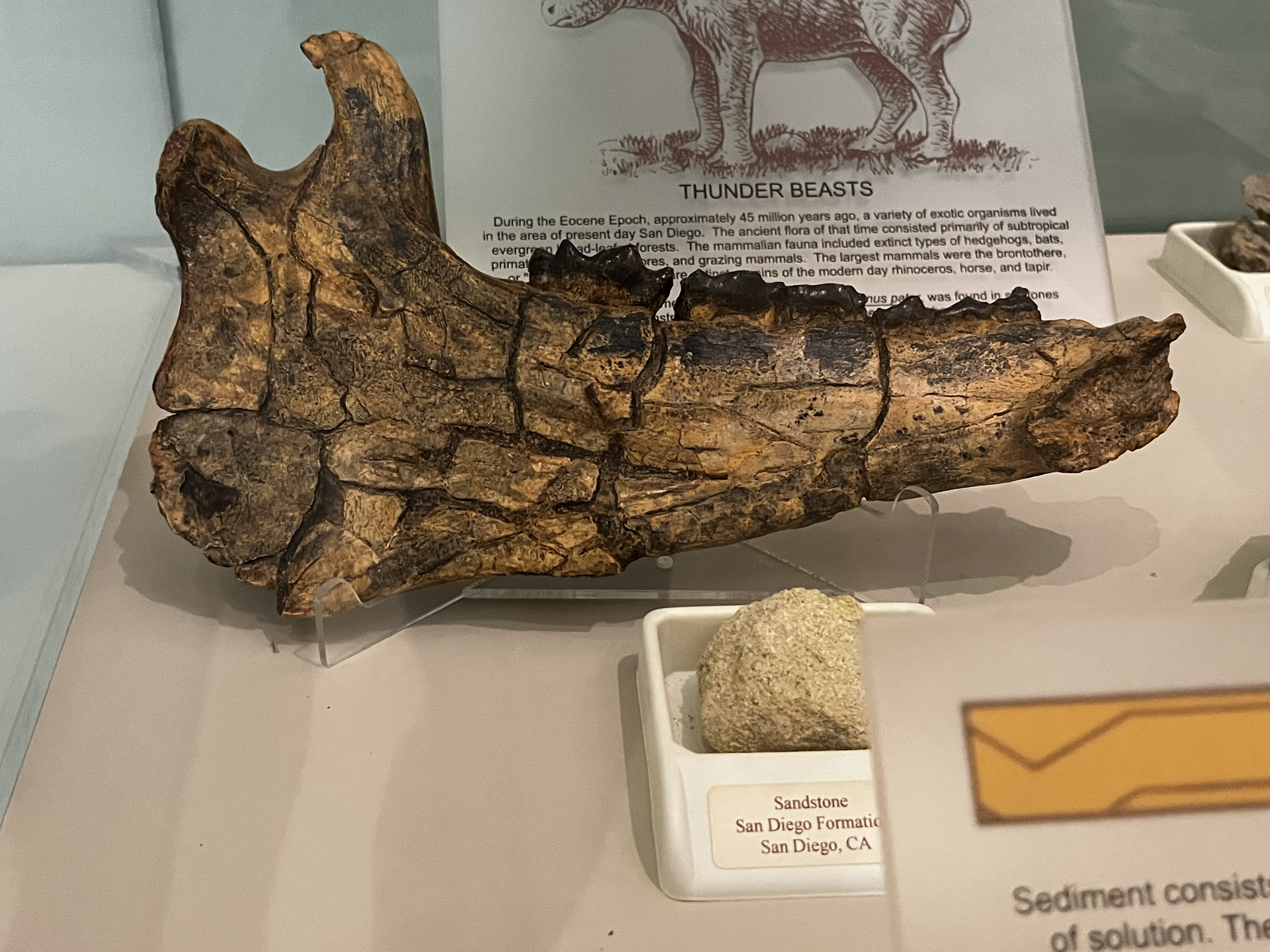
Jaw of Metarhinus

Rhadinorhines are known only from cranial fossils (skulls, jaws, and teeth). They were small to intermediate-sized brontotheres that share a single securely identified apomorphy (shared evolved trait): that the premaxillomaxillary rostrum (the snout of the animal, below the nasal incision) does not deepen ventrally (towards the underside). This trait is also seen in the more distantly related Dolichorhinus hyognathus, though is in that case treated as a case of convergent evolution.

== Classification ==
=== History, systematics, and phylogenetics ===
Fossendorhinus diploconus was the first rhadinorhine to be described, by Henry Fairfield Osborn in 1895, under the name "Telmatotherium diploconum". In 1929, Osborn named the brontothere subfamily "Rhadinorhininae" to encompass only the genus Rhadinorhinus, which per Osborn's taxonomy included the two species R. abbotti and R. diploconus (formerly T. diploconum). Osborn placed the genus Metarhinus in a separate subfamily, "Dolichorhininae", alongside the genera Dolichorhinus, Mesatirhinus, and Sphenocoelus.

Rhadinorhinus is today considered a junior synonym of Metarhinus. In a major 2008 brontothere monograph, Matthew C. Mihlbachler transferred "R". diploconus to the distinct genus Fossendorhinus. In a phylogenetic analysis performed for the monograph, Mihlbachler recovered a small clade containing Metarhinus and Fossendorhinus. Mihlbachler referred to this clade as Rhadinorhinina, having reranked "Rhadinorhininae" to the status of a subtribe to fit with his larger-scale systematic revision of the brontotheres. Rhadinorhinina was not recovered as a clade in a 2016 analysis by Mihlbachler and Thomas A. Deméré, but recovered again in a 2021 analysis by Mihlbachler and Donald Prothero. The cladograms below show brontothere classification per the primary strict reduced consensus tree from Mihlbachler's 2008 analysis, and the reduced strict consensus tree from the 2021 analysis by Mihlbachler and Prothero:

Topology A: Mihlbachler (2008)

- Brontotheriidae
  - - Eotitanops
    - - cf. Eotitanops
      - - Palaeosyops
        - Brontotheriinae
          - Bunobrontops savagei
          - - Mesatirhinus junius
            - - Dolichorhinus hyognathus
              - - Desmatotitan tukhumensis
                - Acrotitan ulanshirehensis
              - - Sphenocoelus uintensis
                - Brontotheriini
                  - - Microtitan mongoliensis
                    - Rhadinorhinina
                      - Fossendorhinus diploconus
                      - - Metarhinus fluviatilis
                        - Metarhinus abbotti
                  - - Sthenodectes incisivum
                    - - Telmatheriina
                        - Telmatherium validus
                        - - Qufutitan zhoui
                          - - Wickia brevirhinus
                            - Metatelmatherium ultimum
                      - - Epimanteoceras formosus
                        - Brontotheriina

Topology B: Mihlbachler & Prothero (2021)

- Brontotheriidae
  - - Eotitanops
    - "cf. Eotitanops" (Eberle, 2006)
    - Eotitanops pakistanensis
    - - Palaeosyops
      - Brontotheriinae
        - Bunobrontops savagei
        - - Balochititanops haqi
          - - Mesatirhinus junius
            - - Dolichorhinus hyognathus
              - - Desmatotitan tukhumensis
                - Acrotitan ulanshirehensis
              - - Sphenocoelus uintensis
                - Brontotheriini
                  - - Microtitan mongoliensis
                    - Rhadinorhinina
                      - Fossendorhinus diploconus
                      - - Metarhinus pater
                        - Metarhinus fluviatilis
                        - Metarhinus abbotti
                  - - Sthenodectes incisivum
                    - - Telmatherium validus
                      - Qufutitan zhoui
                      - - Wickia brevirhinus
                        - Xylotitan cenosus
                        - Metatelmatherium ultimum
                      - - Epimanteoceras formosus
                        - Brontotheriina

=== Etymology ===
The name Rhadinorhinina is derived from the now invalid genus Rhadinorhinus (=Metarhinus). Rhadinorhinus means "slender nose", from the Greek ῥαδινός (rhadinós, "slender") and ῥινος (rhinos, "nose"). Members of the Rhadinorhinina are informally referred to as "rhadinorhines".

== Evolutionary history and paleobiogeography ==
The two known rhadinorhine genera, Fossendorhinus and Metarhinus, are known only from the Uintan land mammal age of the western United States. Metarhinus is known from Wyoming, Utah, and California, from deposits of early to middle Uintan age (Ui1–Ui2). Fossendorhinus is known from the middle Uintan (mid-to-late Ui2) of Utah.
