= Pakotitanops =

Pakotitanops Temporal range: Middle Eocene
- Drawing of the type specimen of P. latidentatus (H-GSP 1050)

Scientific classification
- Kingdom: Animalia
- Phylum: Chordata
- Class: Mammalia
- Order: Perissodactyla
- Family: †Brontotheriidae
- Subfamily: †Brontotheriinae (?)
- Genus: †Pakotitanops; West, 1980
- Species: †P. latidentatus

Binomial name
- †Pakotitanops latidentatus West, 1980

Extinct genus of mammals

Pakotitanops (lit. 'Pakistani titanic face') is a dubious extinct genus of brontothere, known from the Middle Eocene of South Asia. A single species has been described, P. latidentatus, based on fragmentary fossils from the Kuldana and Baska formations of Pakistan.

== Research history ==
Pakotitanops latidentatus was described by Robert M. West in 1980, based on a fragment of a maxilla (H-GSP 1050) which preserves the left second molar, and the roots of the left third molar. The fossil was found in the Kuldana Formation, in the Ganda Kas area of Punjab, Pakistan. West named the new genus after Pakistan. West differentiated H-GSP 1050 from the only co-occurring brontothere, Eotitanops dayi (now classified as Palaeosyops dayi), by the much larger size and apparently more advanced morphology of the new fossil. He also noted some apparent unique features of the specimen, such as the second molar being considerably wider than it is long and having a rectangular outline, and a weakly developed ectoloph. West considered the width to be especially unique, and a trait that differentiated Pakotitanops from other known brontotheres, which typically have nearly square or more narrow molars.

In 2001, J. G. M. Thewissen, E. M. Williams and S. T. Hussain referred some additional fragmentary fossils to P. latidentatus, from the Kuldana Formation in Ganda Kas. These included a partial left third premolar (H-GSP 97114) and some additional maxilla and tooth fragments. Due to the fragmentary nature of both the type material and the new fossils, they were referred to P. latidentatus mainly based on their size.

In 2008, Matthew C. Mihlbachler designated Pakotitanops as a nomen dubium, noting that the unique features used by West to diagnose the genus and species—the wide molar and weakly developed ectoloph—were due to extensive wear having altered the proportions and features of the fossil. Mihlbachler noted that Pakotitanops was nevertheless likely to be a valid taxon due to an apparent unique combination of features in the molar of the type specimen, but that the fossil was not sufficiently well preserved to adequately diagnose and describe it.

In 2011, Peter Missiaen, Gregg F. Gunnell, and Philip D. Gingerich tentatively referred a left astragalus (GSP-UM 3497) from the Baska Formation, in the Dargah region of Balochistan, Pakistan, to P. latidentatus. Missiaen, Gunnell, and Gingerich noted that the astraglus was similar in size and morphology to that of the North American Palaeosyops robustus, and that P. latidentatus was the only brontothere of a similar size known from the correct timeframe in South Asia.

== Description and classification ==
Pakotitanops was a relatively large animal, similar in size to brontotheres such as Telmatherium, Dolichorhinus, and North American representatives of Palaeosyops.

The precise phylogenetic position of Pakotitanops is difficult to determine due to the poor fossil material, though it has been interpreted as more derived than Palaeosyops. The second molar of the type specimen preserves a paraconule, similar in size to the same structure in Palaeosyops and Mesatirhinus, and much larger than the occasionally preserved paraconules of the more derived brontotheres Dolichorhinus and Telmatherium. The second molar also has a distinct central molar fossa (depression in the center of the upper surface of the molar), which is not seen in either Palaeosyops or Mesatirhinus. In brontotheres similar in size to Pakotitanops, central molar fossae and vestigial paraconules are known only in Dolichorhinus. The combination of a Dolichorhinus-like central molar fossa and a paraconule similar in size to those of Mesatirhinus may be a unique trait of Pakotitanops.

== Paleoecology ==
The fossils referred to Pakotitanops from the Kuldana and Baska formations are Middle Eocene in age. Pakotitanops was the largest brontothere in its environment, much larger than the contemporary (or near-contemporary) Palaeosyops dayi and Mulkrajanops moghliensis, known from nearby localities.

The Kuldana Formation preserves evidence of several different types of environments, including both relatively humid and relatively arid habitats. The Ganda Kas fossil localities were deposited in a floodplain environment, with some localties deposited under fluvial conditions. The Ganda Kas fauna included a diverse assortment of taxa, including primitive cetaceans, anthracobunids, raoellids, dichobunids, primitive tapiroids, brontotheres, hyaenodonts, and mesonychids. The Baska Formation was deposited in a shallow marine environment and has yielded limited fossil material.
