= Bunobrontops =

Bunobrontops Temporal range: Middle Eocene (Sharamurunian), c. 40 Ma
- Drawing of the B. savagei type specimen (UCMP 128416), a molar

Scientific classification
- Kingdom: Animalia
- Phylum: Chordata
- Class: Mammalia
- Order: Perissodactyla
- Family: †Brontotheriidae
- Subfamily: †Brontotheriinae
- Genus: †Bunobrontops; Holroyd & Ciochon, 2000
- Species: †B. savagei

Binomial name
- †Bunobrontops savagei Holroyd & Ciochon, 2000

Extinct genus of mammals

Bunobrontops (lit. 'mound thunder face') is an extinct genus of brontothere that lived in Southeast Asia during the Middle Eocene, in the Sharamurunian land mammal age. The genus contains a single species, B. savagei, known from isolated molars found in the Pondaung Formation of Myanmar.

Bunobrontops has been estimated to have reached a weight of about half a tonne (1,100 lbs). Despite the poor fossil material, Bunobrontops is easily distinguished from other brontotheres by a unique combination of primitive and advanced characteristics in the molars. This unique combination represents an important morphological link between early brontotheres such as Eotitanops and Palaeosyops, and more derived forms.

== Research history ==
Bunobrontops savagei was described in 2000 by Patricia A. Holroyd and Russell L. Ciochon, based on several isolated upper and lower molars. All of the teeth were discovered in the Pondaung Formation, dating to the late middle Eocene (equivalent to the Sharamurunian land mammal age), at several sandstone localities in the Pale Township in central Myanmar. Holroyd and Ciochon designated the right second molar UCMP 128416, found approximately 3 miles (4.8 km) north of the village Bahin in the Pale Township, as the holotype specimen. Despite only having isolated teeth, Holroyd and Ciochon were able to distinguish Bunobrontops as a distinct taxon by the unique combination of characteristics in its molars. Later in 2000, Takehisa Tsubamoto and colleagues referred additional teeth from the Pondaung Formation to B. savagei.

The genus name Bunobrontops references the more bunodont (having low, conical cusps) molars of the genus when compared to other Asian brontotheres known at the time. The term "bunodont" derives from the Ancient Greek βουνός (mound) and ὀδούς (tooth). The name Brontops is a genus name now considered a synonym of Megacerops, but often used in the name of other brontotheres. Brontops means "thunder face", from Ancient Greek βροντή (thunder) and ὤψ (face). (Note: Brontops has also been interpreted as "resembling Brontotherium", as in "having the face of Bronto(therium)". Brontotherium is also considered a synonym of Megacerops.) The species name savagei honors paleontologist Donald E. Savage, who restarted paleontological field work in the Pondaung Formation in the late 20th century.

In addition to the teeth referred to B. savagei, Holroyd and Ciochon also referred two fragmentary molars (AMNH 32523a and AMNH 32523b) from the Pondaung Formation to B. sp., recognizing them as belonging to a smaller representative of Bunobrontops. In 2008, Matthew C. Mihlbachler reclassified AMNH 32523a and AMNH 32523b as Palaeosyops sp., citing greater similarities to that genus. Holroyd and Ciochon also believed that some postcranial brontothere fossils found in the Pondaung Formation may belong to Bunobrontops, but that it is impossible to determine which local brontothere genus any postcrania pertain to.

== Description ==
The molars of Bunobrontops preserve a unique and distinctive combination of characteristics. They retain several plesiomorphies (ancestral traits), shared with more primitive brontotheres such as Palaeosyops, including prominent labial ribs, the lingual sides of the metacone and paracone being rounded, and a brachydont ectoloph. The molars also have several more derived characteristics, similar to the molars of brontotheres such as Mesatirhinus, including the lack of a cingular parastyle shelf, a lingually angled ectoloph, and the enamel of the lingual sides of the paracon and metacone being unthickened. Through combining these features, Bunobrontops represents a morphological link between the more bunodont molars of early brontotheres such as Eotitanops and Palaeosyops, and more derived forms. Some features of the molars are also entirely unique to Bunobrontops, including the presence of moderately crenulated enamel in the basins of the lower molars, and on the lingual surfaces of the upper molars.

In 2023, Oscar Sanisidro, Mihlbachler, and Juan L. Cantalapiedra estimated the body mass of B. savagei at 505.01 kilograms (1,113.4 lb).

== Classification ==
Holroyd and Ciochon recognized Bunobrontops as a primitive brontothere, close to primitive genera such as Eotitanops and Palaeosyops. They noted that finding the precise phylogenetic position of the new genus was difficult, especially since Asian brontothere systematics had not been revised for some time. Brontotheres, including all Asian taxa, were extensively revised by Matthew C. Mihlbachler in 2008. In a phylogenetic analysis, Mihlbachler recovered Bunobrontops as a very basal brontothere, though more derived than Eotitanops and Palaeosyops, and placed in the subfamily Brontotheriinae. Subsequent analyses have continued to recover Bunobrontops in similar positions.

Mihlbachler, 2008

- - Danjiangia
  - - Lambdotherium
    - Brontotheriidae
      - Eotitanops
      - - cf. Eotitanops (Ellesmere Island)
        - - Palaeosyops
          - Brontotheriinae
            - Bunobrontops savagei
            - - Mesatirhinus junius
              - More derived brontotheres

Missiaen, Gunnell & Gingerich, 2011

- - Lambdotherium
  - Brontotheriidae
    - Eotitanops minimus
    - Eotitanops borealis
    - Eotitanops pakistanensis
    - - Palaeosyops fontinalis
      - - Palaeosyops paludosus
        - Balochititanops haqi
        - Brontotheriinae
          - Bunobrontops
          - - Mesatirhinus
            - More derived brontotheres

Mihlbachler & Prothero, 2021

- - Danjiangia
  - - Lambdotherium
    - Brontotheriidae
      - Eotitanops
      - cf. Eotitanops (Ellesmere Island)
      - Eotitanops pakistanensis
      - - Palaeosyops
        - Brontotheriinae
          - Bunobrontops savagei
          - - Balochititanops haqi
            - - Mesatirhinus junius
              - More derived brontotheres

== Paleoecology ==
The Pondaung Formation has been dated to the late Middle Eocene, c. 40 million years ago. The paleoenvironment was an inland terrestrial environment on a deltaic plain, with several river channels. Local environments included open-forested seasonal wetlands, and littoral to riparian forests. The presence of primates such as Kyitchaungia (1.6–1.8 kg) suggest that at least parts of the forests were dense enough to allow for their arboreal lifestyle.

The Pondaung fauna is most well known for abundant fossils of anthracotheres, and for several enigmatic primates. The anthacotheres have been subject to several revisions, and are currently considered to be represented by five genera: Anthracohyus, Anthracotherium, Anthracokeryx, Myaingtherium, and Siamotherium. Primates were represented by several groups, including amphipithecids, adapiforms, eosimiiforms, eosimiids, and tarsiids. In addition to anthracotheres, other large mammals included amynodonts, tapiroids, ruminants, chalicotherioids, and other brontotheres. The Pondaung brontothere fauna is not as well-studied, but includes additional and poorly known species more derived than Bunobrontops, whose fossils have historically questionably been referred to the genera Metatelmatherium and Sivatitanops.
