= Nanotitanops =

Nanotitanops Temporal range: Lutetian

Scientific classification
- Kingdom: Animalia
- Phylum: Chordata
- Class: Mammalia
- Infraclass: Placentalia
- Order: Perissodactyla
- Family: †Brontotheriidae
- Genus: †Nanotitanops; Qi & Beard, 1998
- Species: †N. shanghuangensis

Binomial name
- †Nanotitanops shanghuangensis Qi & Beard, 1998

Extinct genus of mammals

Nanotitanops is an extinct genus of Brontothere from the middle Eocene of China. It contains a single species, N. shanghuangensis. It is known only from isolated teeth, the smallest of any known Brontothere.

== Description ==
This genus is currently known only from dental evidence. Described specimens do not exceed 13.55 millimeters in length and 12 millimeters in width. While it retains some basal traits, the teeth possess features which point toward it being relatively derived. It differs from basal designs in having relatively longer and narrower molars with stronger development of buccal shearing crests and only a vestigial paraconule on the upper molars. The dental morphology is most similar to the much larger genera Epimanteoceras and Rhinotitan.

== Relationships ==
The exact placement of Nanotitanops within Brontotheridae is uncertain. There are other small brontotheres from the Eocene of Asia such as Microtitan, Pygmaetitan, and Protitan though morphological evidence does not support a monophyletic relationship between them. Morphological analysis tends to put Nanotitanops in a polytomy near the node of the subfamily Brontotheriinae. It has been proposed as a possible sister taxon to Epimanteoceras formosa. Nanotitanops was originally named Nanotitan, but this genus name was preoccupied by an orthopteroid insects from the Triassic of Kyrgyzstan. The genus name is derived from the Greek nanos, meaning dwarf, titan, referring to the Titans of Greek mythology, and the Greek suffix -ops, meaning face. The specific epithet of the only species refers to the village in which the first and only specimens have been found.

== Paleobiology ==
This genus is only described from the astoundingly rich middle Eocene fissure-filling near the village of Shanghuang in southern Jiangsu Province, China. The fissures also held another small brontothere, Microtitan cf. mongoliensis, a species known from the Irdin Manha Formation of the Nei Mongol Autonomous Region of China. They are both known only from a site dubbed Fissure D. This fissure contained various other mammalian fauna including the primitive cricetid rodent Pappocricetodon antiquus and the omomyid or omomyid-like primate Macrotarsius macrorhysis. The nearby fissures have included a large diversity of primates. There is also a Dichobunid known from the area, called Elaschitotherium qii.
