= Ulan Shireh Formation =

Geologic formation in Inner Mongolia, China

- Stratigraphic range: Middle Eocene
- Type: Formation

Location
- Region: Inner Mongolia
- Country: China

The Ulan Shireh Formation is a geologic formation in Inner Mongolia, China. It preserves fossils dating back to the Middle Eocene, including mammals of the Irdinmanhan land mammal age. The formation is correlated with the Irdin Manha Formation, also in Inner Mongolia, and is believed to have been deposited in the same timeframe.

== Mammal fossils ==
=== Artiodactyla ===
Genus/family	Species	Notes/affinities	Images
Gobihyus	G. orientalis?	A choeropotamid	

=== Didymoconidae ===
Genus/family	Species	Notes/affinities	Images
Kennatherium	K. shirehensis	A didymoconid	

=== Perissodactyla ===
Genus/family	Species	Notes/affinities	Images
Acrotitan	A. ulanshirehensis	A brontothere	
Breviodon	B. minutus	A lophialetid	
Breviodon	B.? sp.	A lophialetid	
Desmatotitan	D. tukhumensis	A brontothere	
Epimanteoceras	E. formosus	A brontothere. Ye (1983) reported both E. formosus and Dolichorhinoides angustidens, species now regarded as synonyms.	
Forstercooperia	F. ulanshirehensis	A paracerathere. Reported by Ye (1983) as F. cf. grandis. Described as F. ulanshirehensis in 2018.	
Lushiamynodon	L. sharamurensnsis	An amynodont. The genus Lushiamynodon may be a synonym of Sharamynodon L. sharamurensis is based on fragmentary remains.	
Microtitan	M. mongoliensis	A brontothere	
Protitan	P. grangeri	A brontothere; previously treated under the synonym P. bellus	
Rhodopagus	R. pygmaeus	A rhodopagid	
Simplaletes	S. ulanshirehensis	A lophialetid	
Teleolophus	T. medius	A deperetellid	
Triplopus?	T.? proficiens	A rhinocerotoid	
Zhongjianoletes	Z. chowi	A lophialetid	
Zhongjianoletes	Z. sp.	A lophialetid	

=== Lagomorphs ===
Genus/family	Species	Notes/affinities	Images
Palaeolaginae	Palaeolaginae indet.		
Shamolagus	S. grangeri	A leporid	

=== Rodents ===
Genus/family	Species	Notes/affinities	Images
Advenimus	A. bohlini	A ctenodactylid	
Advenimus	cf. A. sp.	A ctenodactylid	
Youmys	Y. wejingensis	An ischyromyid (?)	
