= Hiram A. Prout =

American physician and mineralogist (1812–1862)

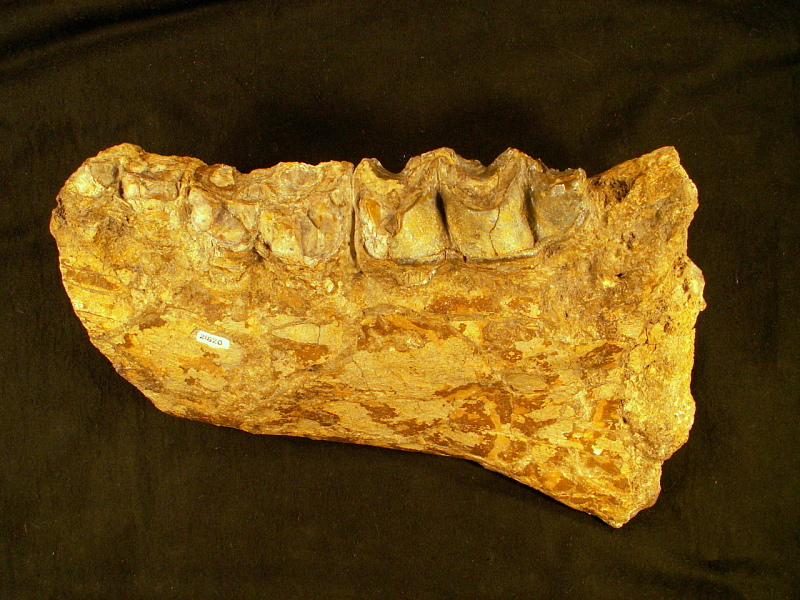
USNM 21820, Prout's "giant Palaeotherium", now considered a specimen of Megacerops

Hiram Augustus Prout (1812–1862) was an American physician, mineralogist, and paleontologist.

In 1847, Prout described USNM 21820, a fossil fragment of a right jaw (USNM 21820), found in the White River badlands of South Dakota. Prout had received the fossil from "a friend residing at one of the trading posits of the St. Louis Fur Company on the Missouri River", likely Alexander Culbertson. The fossil was the first fossil from west of the Mississippi River to be described scientifically, and has since been identified as the first scientifically published fossil of a brontothere, an extinct family of mammals. Prout identified the fossil as a "giant Palaeotherium"; it was later described under the name Menodus giganteus, and is now considered to be a specimen of Megacerops. Prout's fossil excited scientists in both the United States and Europe, and was instrumental in the development of vertebrate paleontology in North America. In his subsequent paleontological career, Prout published on both fossil mammals and fossil invertebrates.

Prout was based in St. Louis, Missouri for much of his career. He was a dedicated member of the St. Louis Academy of Science, and took part in the Illinois Geological Survey in 1851.
