= Sivatitanops =

Sivatitanops Temporal range: Middle Eocene 40 Ma

Scientific classification
- Kingdom: Animalia
- Phylum: Chordata
- Class: Mammalia
- Infraclass: Placentalia
- Order: Perissodactyla
- Family: †Brontotheriidae
- Genus: †Sivatitanops; Pilgrim, 1925

Species
- S. cotteri (Pilgrim,1925); S. birmanicum (Pilgrim and Cotter, 1916); "S". rugosidens (Pilgrim,1925)

Synonyms
- Telmatherium birmanicum (Pilgrim and Cotter, 1916)

Extinct genus of brontothere

Sivatitanops is a dubious genus of fragmentary brontotheriid mammal from the Eocene of Myanmar and Bulgaria.

== Description ==
Known from mainly fragmentary cranial and dental material, not much is known about the anatomy of Sivatitanops. The facial region of the skull is short and broad, and it is speculated any horns would be small. The molars are larger than the premolars, and the premolars are only in the beginning steps of molarization. The canines are enlarged, as with the incisors.

== Classification ==
The lack of good remains for Sivatitanops has led to it having a convoluted classification history. Species like "Sivatitanops" rugosidens are known from such little material that they are debatably placed within the genus.
