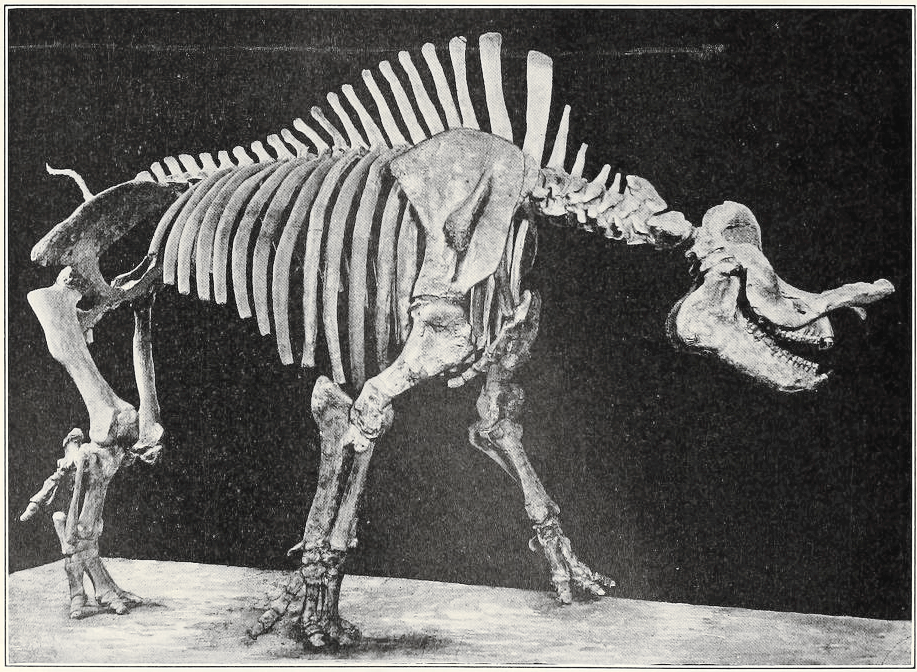
- Skeleton of Megacerops, a horned brontothere (Brontotheriina)
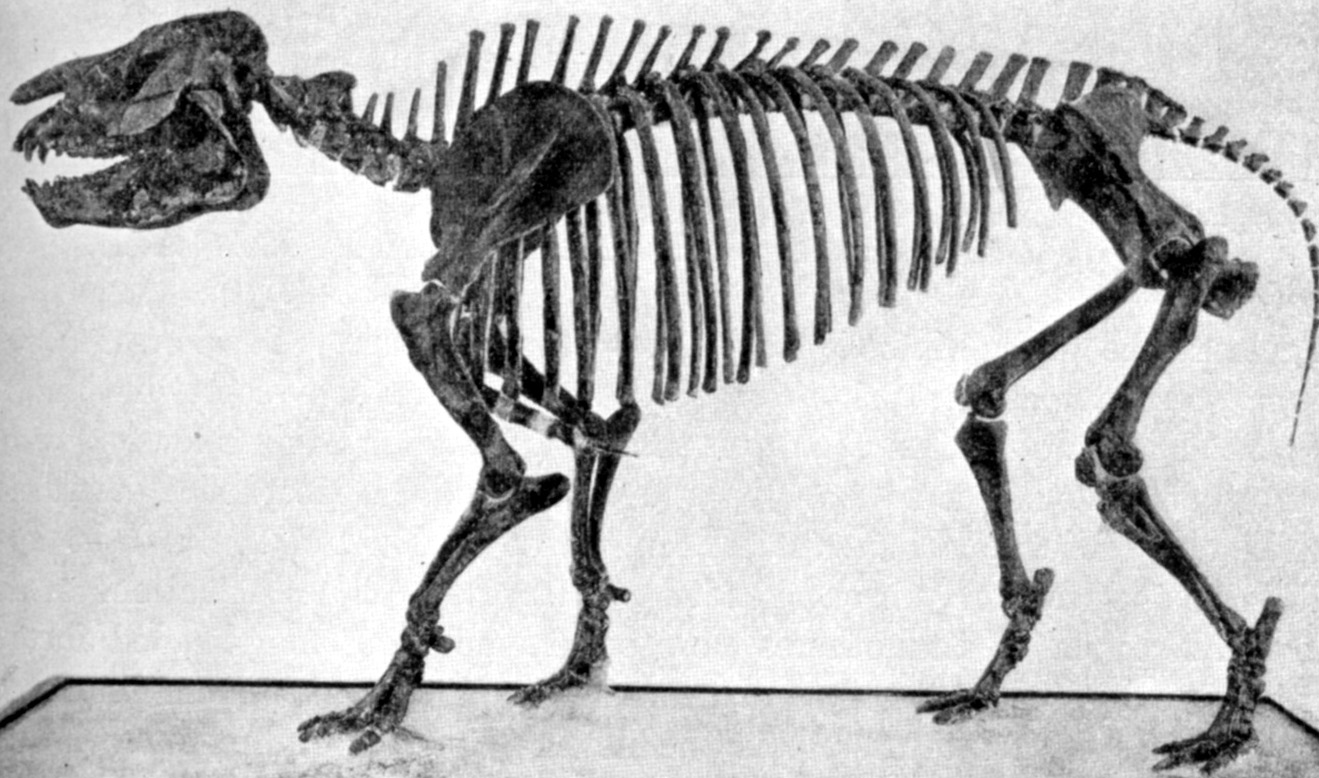
- Skeleton of Palaeosyops, a basal brontothere

Scientific classification
- Kingdom: Animalia
- Phylum: Chordata
- Class: Mammalia
- Order: Perissodactyla
- Family: †Brontotheriidae; Marsh, 1873

Genera and subgroups
- †Eotitanops; †Mulkrajanops?; †Palaeosyops; †Brontotheriinae Marsh, 1873; †Acrotitan; †Balochititanops; †Bunobrontops; †Desmatotitan; †Dolichorhinus; †Mesatirhinus; †Pakotitanops?; †Sphenocoelus; †Brontotheriini Marsh, 1873; †Epimanteoceras; †Microtitan; †Nanotitanops; †Sthenodectes; †Brontotheriina; †Rhadinorhinina; †Telmatheriina

Synonyms
- Limnohyidae Marsh, 1875; Menodontidae Cope, 1881; Palaeosyopidae Osborn, 1910; Titanotheriidae Flower, 1876

= Brontotheriidae =

Brontotheres Temporal range: Eocene, 53–33.7 Ma

Extinct family of odd-toed ungulates

Brontotheres (lit. 'thunder beasts'), also called titanotheres (lit. 'titanic beasts'), are an extinct group of perissodactyl (odd-toed ungulate) mammals belonging to the family Brontotheriidae. Brontotheres are traditionally interpreted as relatives of horses, though high-level perissodactyl relationships are not well understood. Brontotheres lived during the Eocene epoch and their fossils have mainly been found in Asia and North America, with some fossils also found in Eastern Europe. Early brontotheres were small animals, but later brontotheres grew to become some of the largest land mammals of the Eocene. (Note: Horned brontotheres were until recently considered the largest land mammals of the Eocene. In 2022, the Late Eocene paracerathere Urtinotherium intermedium was estimated to have reached a weight of 4.9–6.1 tonnes (11,000–13,000 lb), in or beyond the range of the uppermost weight estimates for the largest brontotheres (Megacerops), at 5 tonnes (5.5 short tons).)

The first brontothere fossils known to science were found in South Dakota in the mid-20th century. The name "brontothere" was derived from Lakota legends of wakíŋyaŋ, which can be translated to "thunder beasts". Over forty brontothere genera have since been recognized. The rapid diversification of the brontotheres, and their sudden extinction at the end of the Eocene after roughly twenty million years of existence, has been described as a "live fast, die young" pattern of evolutionary radiation. Over the course of their evolution, brontotheres experienced one of the most extreme increases in body size in mammalian evolutionary history, from early forms such as Eotitanops, weighing less than 100 kilograms (220 lb), to later four-tonne (4.4 short-tonne) animals, such as Megacerops and Embolotherium. At their peak in the Middle Eocene, brontotheres were the most diverse clade of large mammals in both Asia and North America.

Most brontotheres had relatively robust skeletons, especially later and larger forms. On the whole, the postcranial brontothere skeleton was conservative, lacking family-specific synapomorphic traits. Brontothere skulls were characterized by the eyes being positioned relatively far forward, resulting in short faces. Dentally, brontotheres were characterized by a unique combination of features in their upper molars.

Various taxonomic frameworks have been used for brontotheres historically, often diverging in what subgroups are recognized. Current brontothere taxonomy, supported by phylogenetic analyses, recognizes several increasingly derived (advanced) clades leading up to the three derived subtribes Rhadinorhinina, Telmatheriina, and Brontotheriina. Brontotheres are also sometimes informally divided into hornless brontotheres and the superficially rhinoceros-like horned brontotheres. The subtribe Brontotheriina contains all horned brontotheres, and about half of all known brontothere genera. Brontothere horns were made of bone and occurred in a variety of shapes and sizes.

== Overview and characteristics ==
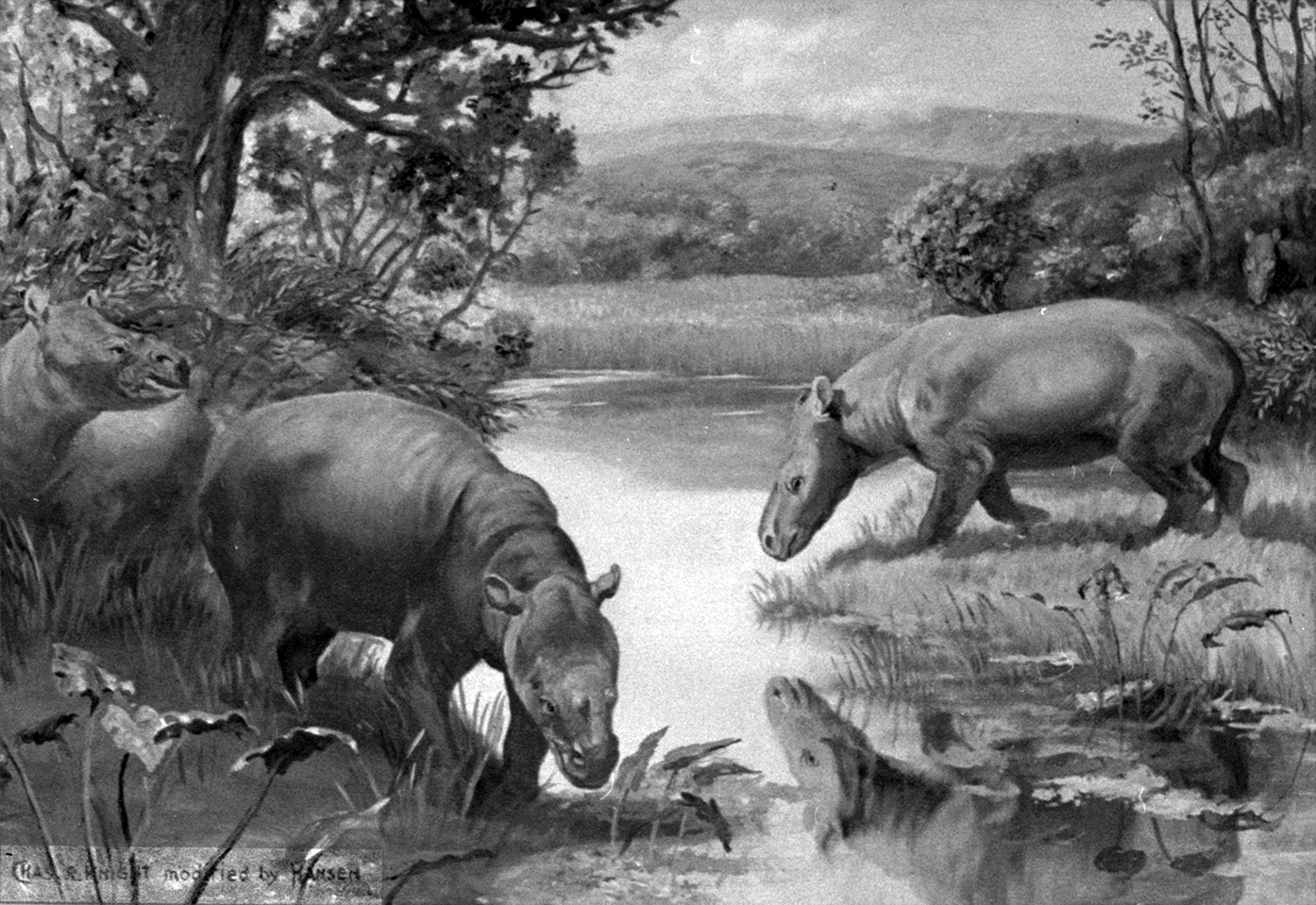
Life restoration of Telmatherium (left) and Dolichorhinus (right) by Charles R. Knight

Brontotheres (family Brontotheriidae) are an extinct group of perissodactyls (odd-toed ungulates), the mammal order that includes modern-day equids, rhinoceroses, and tapirs. Fossils of brontotheres are known only from the Eocene epoch, and they are thus considered to have gone extinct during the Eocene–Oligocene extinction event. Some late brontotheres were previously treated as Oligocene animals but reassessments of the relevant fossil deposits since the 1990s have restricted the group to the Eocene.

Brontotheres are popularly known for their very large body sizes and the evolution of horns in various shapes. These features do not apply to all brontotheres, and are restricted to the derived horned brontotheres (the subtribe Brontotheriina). Most brontotheres are characterized by the orbits (eye sockets) being placed relatively far forward on the skull. Over the course of brontothere evolution, the face shortened further, and the postorbital (behind the eyes) part of the skull consequently became longer. Most brontotheres had comparatively robust skeletons, with later forms being more massive. All brontotheres had the primitive perissodactyl condition of four toes on their manus (front feet) and three on their pes (hind feet). In modern perissodactyls, this arrangement is retained only in the tapirs.

Dentally, brontotheres were characterized by bunoselenodont upper molars, meaning that the molars had inner cusps in the shape of blunt cones and outer cusps modified into crescents. The molars also had distinctive W-shaped ectolophs (shearing edges). The W-shaped ectolophs are shared with chalicotheres and some equoids, but unlike these groups, brontothere upper molars either lacked cross-lophs (transverse, i.e. widthwise, crests connecting the different cusps of the teeth), or had them only vestigially. Based on their dentition, it can be inferred that all brontotheres were browsers.

== Research history ==
=== Early brontothere research ===
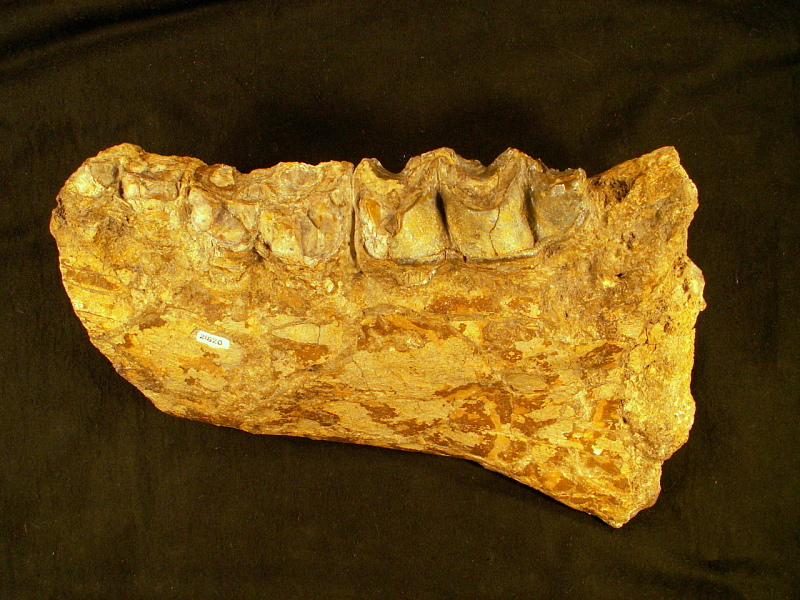
Hiram A. Prout's brontothere jaw, now recognized as a specimen of Megacerops

The first brontothere fossils known to science were found in the White River badlands of South Dakota. They were among the first fossils of mammals, and vertebrates generally, from the American West to be brought to scientific attention. White River brontothere fossils, including a jaw, were described for the first time in 1847, by Hiram A. Prout who believed them to represent remains of giant equoids. Prout's jaw captured the attention of the nascent paleontological community in the United States and set into motion the first wave of a "fossil rush" in the western parts of the country. The White River fossils are now recognized as remains of the genus Megacerops. Joseph Leidy was the first to provide more extensive scientific descriptions of brontothere fossils, though the fossils he had access to were mostly fragmentary and did not allow for detailed study of their anatomy or appearance. Leidy named both Megacerops and the much more primitive brontothere Palaeosyops, though close relations between the two were not recognized at the time.

The first paleontologists to study and describe complete brontothere skulls and skeletons were the rival researchers Edward Drinker Cope and Othniel Charles Marsh in the mid-to-late 19th century. Marsh's contributions were particularly important. In 1873, Marsh described the new genus Brontotherium (lit. 'thunder beast'), which he named after Lakota legends of wakíŋyaŋ, which can be translated as "thunder beasts". It is believed that brontothere fossils, long before the time of paleontological research, were sometimes exposed by severe rainstorms and found by Native Americans of the Lakota Sioux and Pawnee peoples, who may have linked them to the wakíŋyaŋ. Modern Lakota legends link the abundant fossils in the White River bandlands to conflicts between the wakíŋyaŋ and monsters called uŋhcegila.

Marsh named the family Brontotheriidae in 1873 and was the first to outline the characteristics of the group. Marsh used the spelling "Brontotheridae", which was emended to Brontotheriidae by Oliver Perry Hay in 1902; the spelling Brontotheriidae has been used by all later researchers. Brontotherium is now considered a synonym of Megacerops but the name Brontotheriidae (and the informal term "brontotheres") remains the established name for the group.

Marsh conceptualized brontotheres as only the large and horned forms, and placed smaller and more primitive forms such as Palaeosyops in a separate family which he called "Limnohyidae". It was first with the description of the primitive horned form Diplacodon in 1875 that Marsh recognized a close connection between the "limnohyids" and brontotheres. By the turn of the century, a large number of North American brontothere taxa had been named, many of which has since been recognized as invalid and synonymous with others. In 1876, the first undisputed European brontothere fossils, found in Romania, were reported by János Böckh and János Matyasovsky, and assigned to the new genus Brachydiastematherium. Brontothere fossils from Asia were first described in 1912, by Guy Ellcock Pilgrim and George de P. Cotter from the Pondaung Formation of Myanmar. These fossils were assigned to the now dubious genus Sivatitanops in 1925.

=== Osborn and post-Osborn research ===
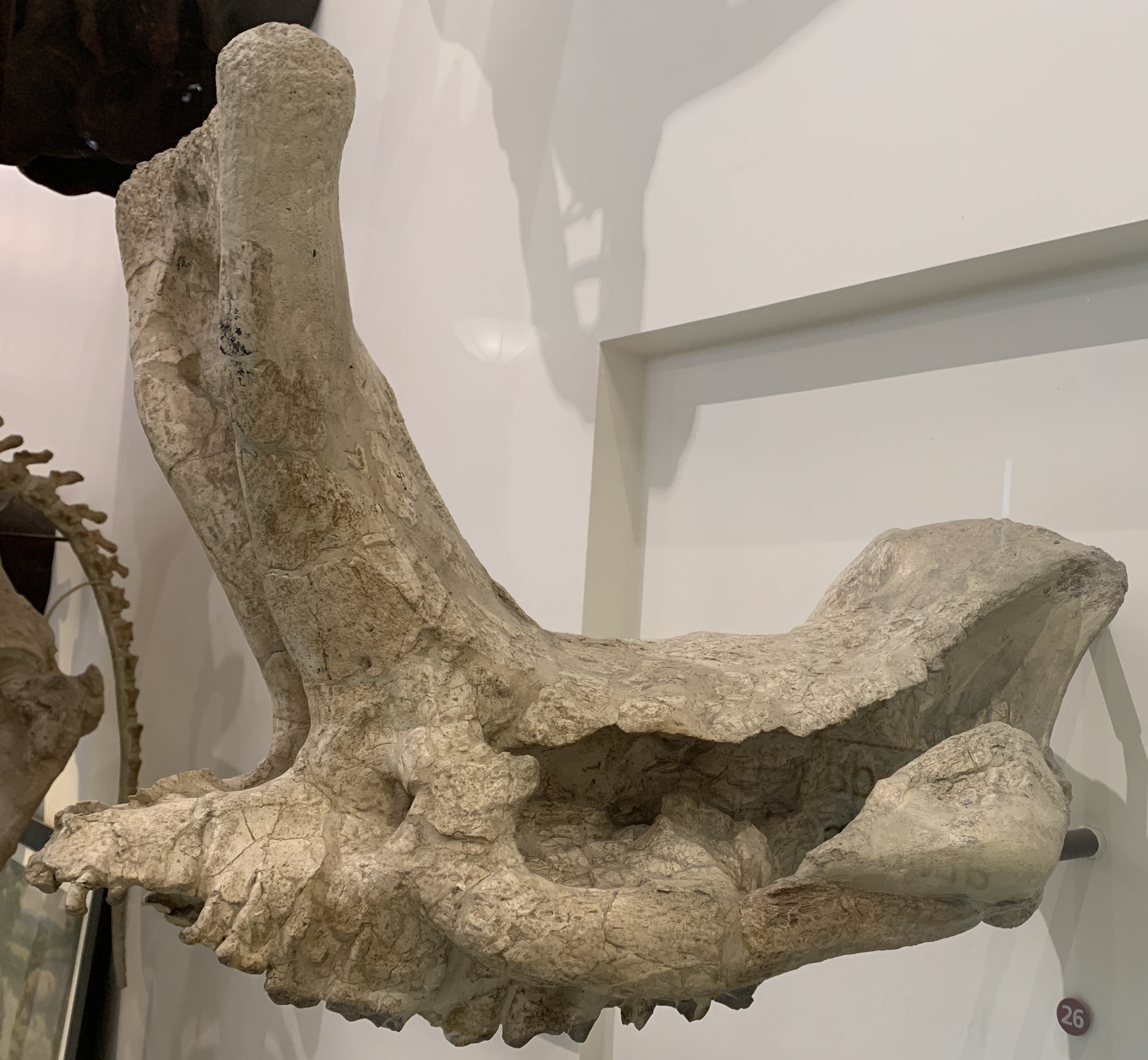
Skull of the Asian horned brontothere Embolotherium at the American Museum of Natural History

Henry Fairfield Osborn energetically pursued the study of brontotheres in the late 19th and early 20th century. In large part due to his efforts, the American Museum of Natural History (AMNH) amassed the largest collection of brontothere fossils in the world. In 1929, Osborn published an extensively illustrated nearly thousand-page monograph on brontotheres, The Titanotheres of Ancient Wyoming, Dakota, and Nebraska, which he believed would be the definitive work on the group. Osborn preferred the name "titanothere" over "brontothere"; "titanothere" is derived from the genus Titanotherium (lit. 'titanic beast'), named by Leidy, now considered another synonym of Megacerops. The monograph was a comprehensive summary of North American brontothere research up until that time, including descriptions of every taxon recognized by Osborn, recountings of original descriptions, and extensive sections on brontothere anatomy.

Osborn included a preliminary summary of new Asian brontotheres in his monograph. Many brontothere fossils were at the time being found by the contemporary Central Asiatic Expeditions of the AMNH. These expeditions were often led by Roy Chapman Andrews and Walter W. Granger, though Osborn described many of the fossils. Through fossils found in the 1920s and 1930s, the diversity of brontotheres in Asia soon rivaled that of North America.

Osborn's brontothere taxonomy was deeply flawed, and influenced by his own discredited views on evolution (orthogenesis). There was a consensus among Osborn's peers, and among later paleontologists, that Osborn grossly oversplit brontothere taxa into an unrealistically high number, sometimes based on arbitrary distinctions. After Osborn, and for much of the 20th century, brontothere systematics and phylogeny were a neglected area of study. Because of the lack of detailed studies, Osborn's monograph long remained the primary reference work for the family, despite wide recognition of its flaws. The immense size of the monograph discouraged many paleontologists from pursuing the study of brontotheres since correcting the mistakes would be an enormous effort.

After Osborn's death, the taxonomy of the brontotheres known from Central Asia was extensively revised in a 1943 paper by Walter W. Granger and William King Gregory, A revision of the Mongolian titanotheres. North American brontotheres were subject to some minor attempts at taxonomic revision over the course of the 20th century, though no major work was done until revisions by Bryn J. Mader in the 1980s and 1990s. Attempts at further revision of Asian brontotheres were made by several Russian and Chinese paleontologists in the 20th century; most of these efforts were based on Granger and Gregory's work since the authors did not have access to the AMNH collections. Granger and Gregory's paper includes several misidentifications and misinterpretations, which impacted the reliability of the research based on it. In 2008, Matthew C. Mihlbachler published a new brontothere monograph, Species Taxonomy, Phylogeny, and Biogeography of the Brontotheriidae (Mammalia: Perissodactyla). Mihlbachler's monograph was the first species-level reexamination and revision since Osborn, featured both Asian and North American taxa, and was supported by a comprehensive phylogenetic analysis, which Mihlbachler used to establish the internal brontothere systematics that are in use today.

== Description ==
=== Skull and dentition ===
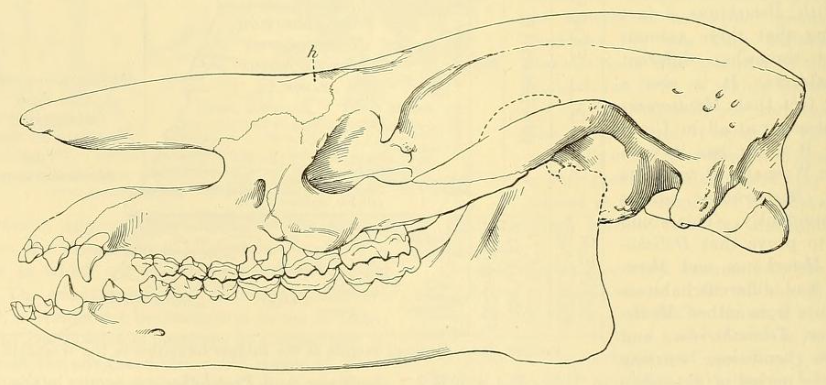
Skull of Dolichorhinus

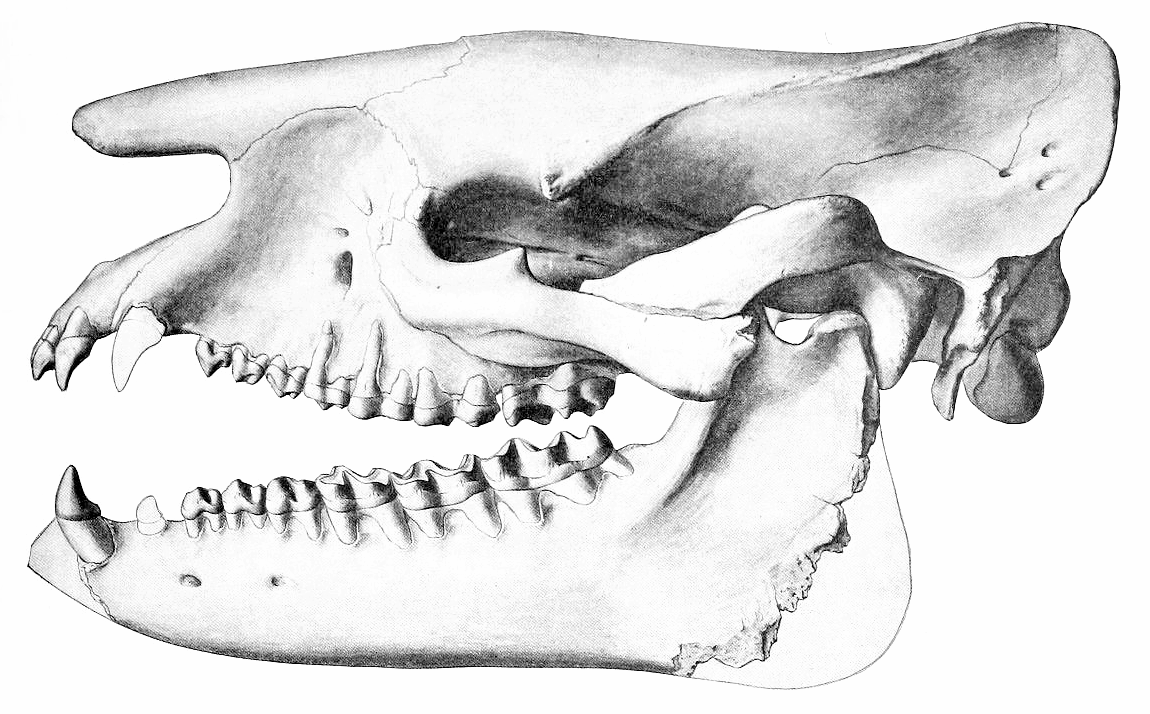
Skull of Metatelmatherium

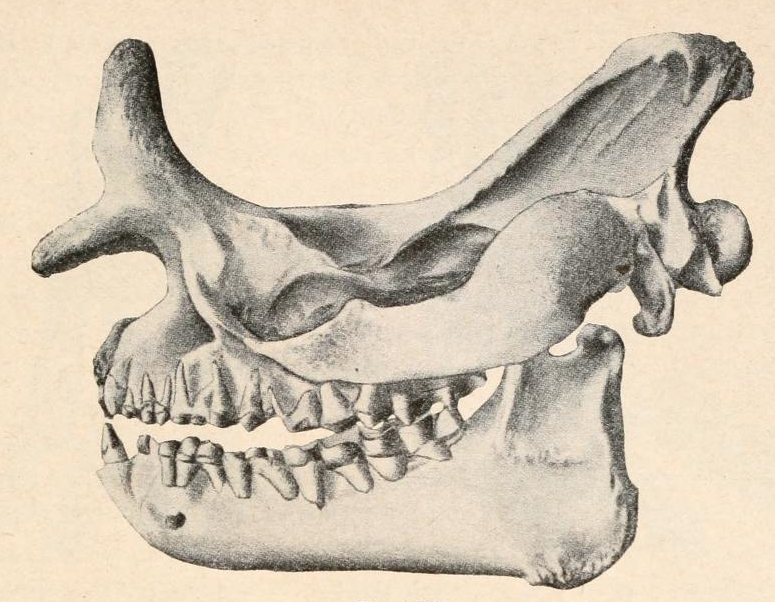
Skull of Megacerops

Brontothere skulls show a diversity of different morphologies. Some brontotheres had highly brachycephalic (short and broad) skulls, such as Palaeosyops, and some had highly dolichocephalic (long and narrow) skulls, such as Sphenocoelus. In most brontotheres, the face was shortened due to the orbits being placed far forward on the skull. In some derived (advanced) brontotheres, the facial region accounted for less than 40% of the total length of the skull. The facial regions of the very earliest brontotheres were probably not shortened; the basal (primitive) genus Eotitanops had a longer face similar to that of other primitive perissodactyls.

The skulls of primitive brontothere had prominent sagittal crests (ridges along the top of the skulls), a feature also seen in primitive members of other perissodactyl groups. In more derived brontotheres, the cranial vertex (highest point of the skull) was widened, leading to the loss of the sagittal crest. In the horned brontotheres (Brontotheriina), the cranial vertex was especially wide and the skull had a distinct saddle-like shape.

The derived brontotheres in the Brontotheriina infratribe are characterized by bony protuberances (horns) placed in front of their orbits. Unlike the horns of rhinoceroses, brontothere horns were made of bone (the nasals and frontals), not keratin. Anatomically, the horns of horned brontothere horns are most similar to the ossicones of giraffes. In many cases the horn formations consisted only of larger or smaller bony swellings, especially in more basal horned brontotheres, but horn morphology was highly variable in more derived forms. Brontotheres may informally be divided into hornless brontotheres and horned brontotheres; only the horned brontotheres form a monophyletic group, since they evolved from hornless ancestors.

The bunoselenodont upper molars of the brontotheres distinguishes them from all other perissodactyls. Bontotheres had W-shaped ectolophs, and isolated lingual (towards the tongue) cusps, lacking connecting cross-lophs. In primitive brontotheres, the paraconules and metaconules (two cusps) were large and developed, but they were either reduced or lost entirely in derived brontotheres. The lophs (cusp-joining crests) of the lower molars had a distinctive M-shape. Primitive brontotheres had three pairs of upper and lower incisors and comparatively large canines. In more derived brontotheres, the incisors became smaller and sometimes reduced in number, the canines became smaller, and the premolars became more molarized (molar-like). It is apparent from fossil brontothere teeth that their teeth were relatively weak; in many old individuals, the teeth are very worn. The molars were particularly subject to wear, especially along the lingual side of the ectolophs, and are worn completely flat in several old specimens.

=== Postcranium ===
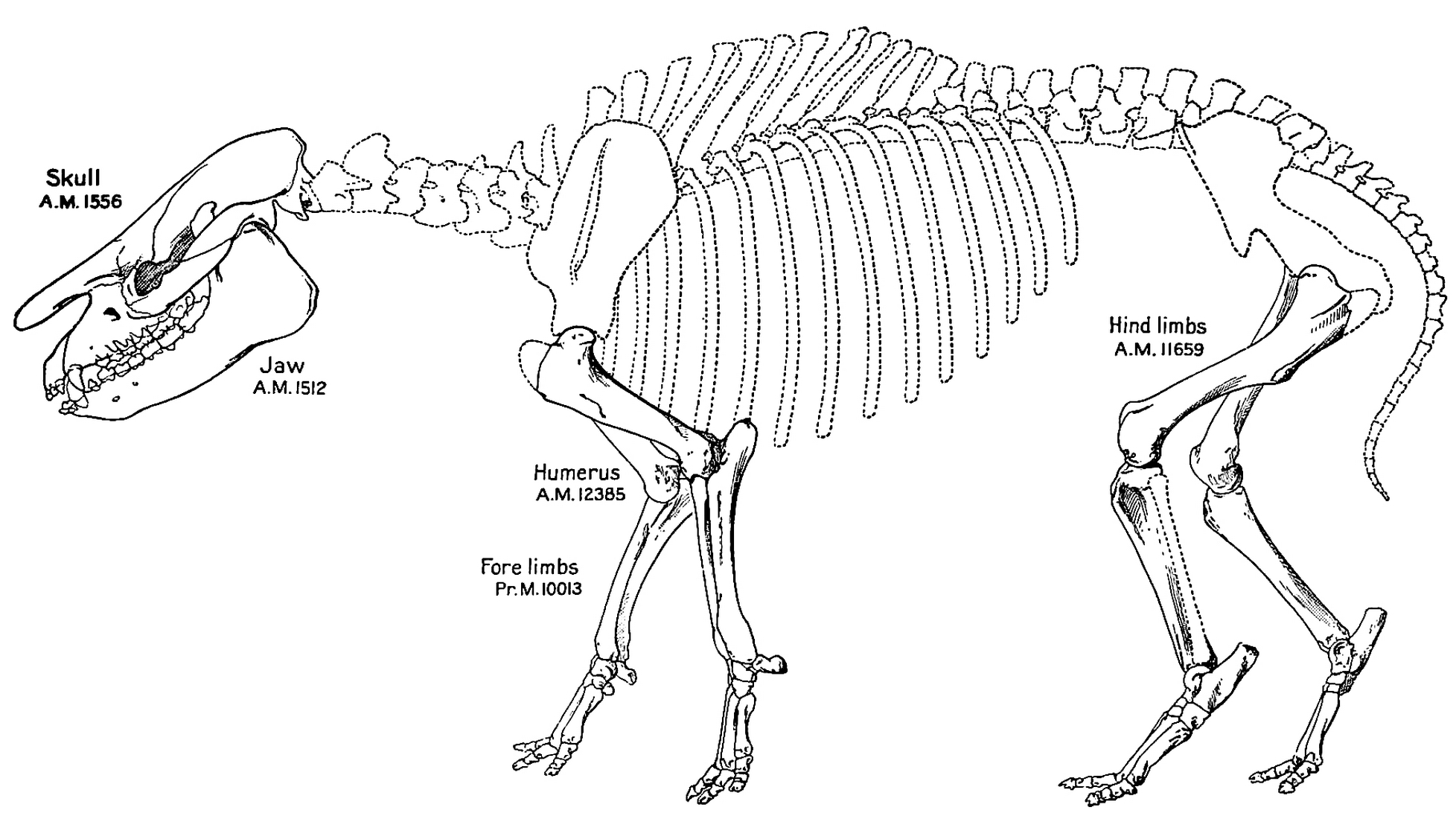
Reconstruction of the skeleton of Mesatirhinus

The postcranial skeleton (skeleton other than the head) of brontotheres has been described as relatively conservative, and there are no securely identified synapomorphies (shared ancestral traits) that unite the family to the exclusion of other perissodactyls. Most of the known brontotheres were bulky and large, and had comparatively short limbs, short necks, and robust, stocky bodies. Primitive brontotheres had the primitive perissodactyl condition of four toes on their manus (front feet) and three on their pes (hind feet), and this was never altered in later forms over the course of brontothere evolution.

Synapomorphies in the postcranial skeleton that unite subgroupings within the brontotheres have also proven difficult to find, a problem compounded by a large number of brontothere taxa only being known from skull or jaw material. Several developments occurred in the postcranial skeleton as brontotheres attained larger body sizes in the Middle and Late Eocene. The largest brontotheres had stockier limbs, a more widely splayed pelvis reminiscent of that of elephants, and the neural spines of the thoracic vertebrae were elongated to support a bulkier head. The hindlimbs of the largest brontotheres were also similar to the hindlimbs of elephants.

== Taxonomy ==
=== External systematics and relations ===
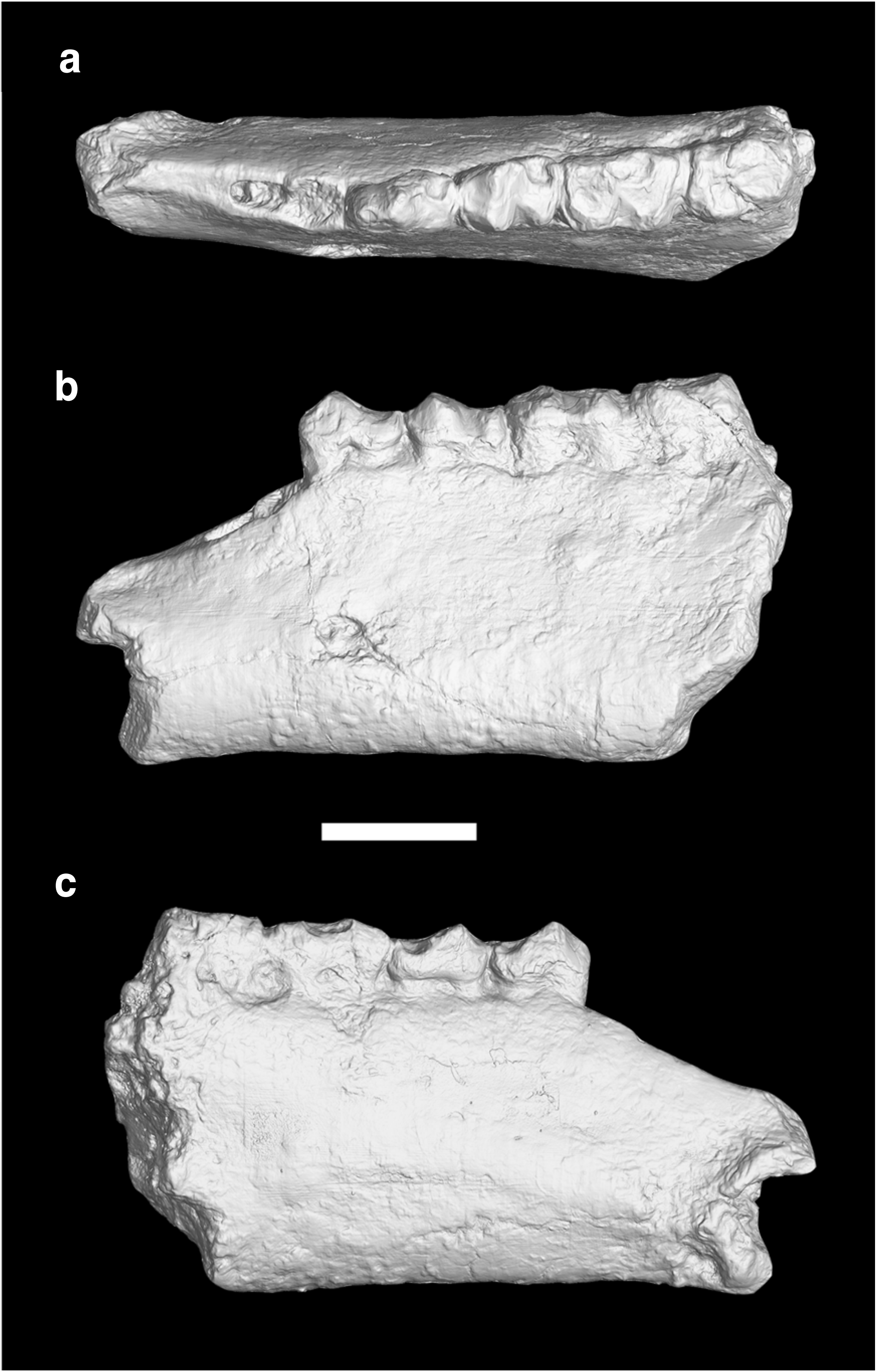
Fragmentary mandible of Danjiangia

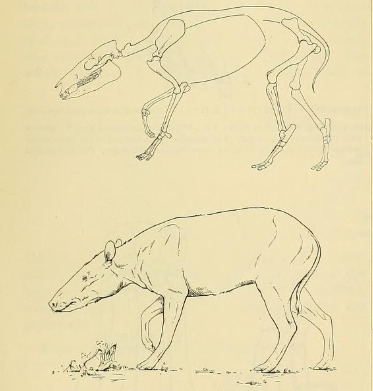
Skeletal and life restoration of Lambdotherium

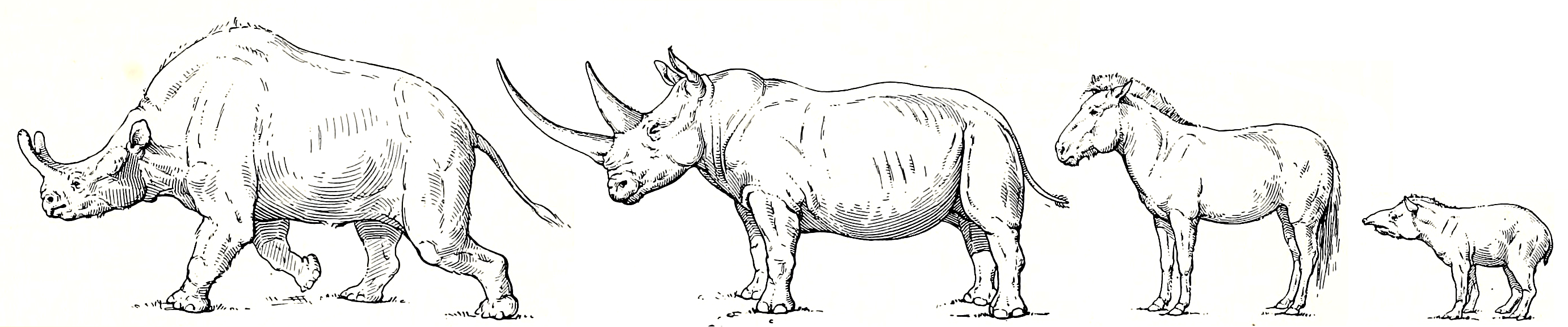
Megacerops compared to some modern perissodactyls

Brontotheres belong to the order Perissodactyla. Within the perissodactyls, brontotheres have traditionally been placed in the suborder Hippomorpha, together with equids, palaeotheres, and sometimes chalicotherioids. The phylogenetic relationships of living perissodactyls to each other are well established—rhinoceroses and tapirs are more closely related to each other than either group is to equids—but relations between extinct families have been heavily disputed since the 1980s, which has left the position of the brontotheres in the perissodactyl family tree unresolved.

The most primitive members of the different perissodactyl lineages were likely more or less indistinguishable from each other. The primitive perissodactyl genus Lambdotherium, known from North America, has traditionally been interpreted as the sister taxon of brontotheres. Since the late 20th century, additional Lambdotherium-like animals have also been found in Asia, most notably Danjiangia, which is sometimes interpreted as an alternative sister taxon of the brontotheres. Lambdotherium and Danjiangia, sometimes treated together as members of Lambdotheriidae, are also sometimes interpreted as basal brontotheres themselves, or placed just outside the family in a larger clade. Various names and ranks have been used for the clade containing both brontotheres and lambdotheres, including the superfamily "Brontotherioidea" and the suborder (or infraorder) "Titanotheriomorpha".

Whether lambdotheres are close relatives of brontotheres has been disputed, and lambdotheres are sometimes alternatively placed closer to the palaeotheres. It is also disputed whether palaeotheres (the family Palaeotheriidae) form a clade at all, since they are sometimes recovered as paraphyletic grade of relatively primitive perissodactyls, sometimes closely related to Brontotheriidae.

Brontotheriidae has been placed in various positions since the 1980s, including:

- In 1989, Donald Prothero and Robert M. Schoch classified Brontotheriidae and Lambdotheriidae as separate families under the superfamily Brontotherioidea, which was placed as a distinct lineage from Hippomorpha and "Moropomorpha". "Moropomorpha" is largely equivalent to the more commonly used Tapiromorpha, and included Ceratomorpha (rhinoceroses and tapirs), Isectolophidae, and Ancylopoda (which includes chalicotherioids).
- In 1997, Malcolm McKenna and Susan K. Bell classified the lambdotheres as a subfamily within Brontotheriidae. Brontotheriidae was placed in the superfamily Brontotherioidea, together with a new family "Anchilophidae" (containing palaeotheres Anchilophus and Paranchilophus). Brontotherioidea was in turn placed as the sister taxon of Chalicotherioidea in a proposed new clade, "Selenida", which was classified under Ceratomorpha.
- In 1999, David J. Froehlich recovered brontotheres as either basal members of Hippomorpha, or a basal clade within Palaeotheriidae.
- In 2011, Luke T. Holbrook and Joshua Lapergola recovered both Lambdotherium and the basal brontothere Palaeosyops as more basal than the split between Hippomorpha and Ceratomorpha/Tapirmorpha.
- In 2018, Bin Bai, Yuan-Qing Wang, and Jin Meng recovered brontotheres as the sister taxon of Tapiromorpha. Palaeotheres were recovered as a paraphyletic grade of basal genera leading up to the Brontotheriidae + Tapiromorpha clade, and Equidae was recovered as the sister taxon of the greater palaeotheres + Brontotheriidae + Tapiromorpha clade.
- In 2026, Jérémy Tissier and Thierry Smith recovered Brontotherioidea (including the brontotheres, and the lambdotheres as a paraphyletic basal grade) as the sister taxon of Equoidea. Brontotherioidea and Equoidea were recovered as derived clades in Hippomorpha, with the palaeotheres recovered as a paraphyletic basal grade of hippomorphs.

=== Internal systematics ===
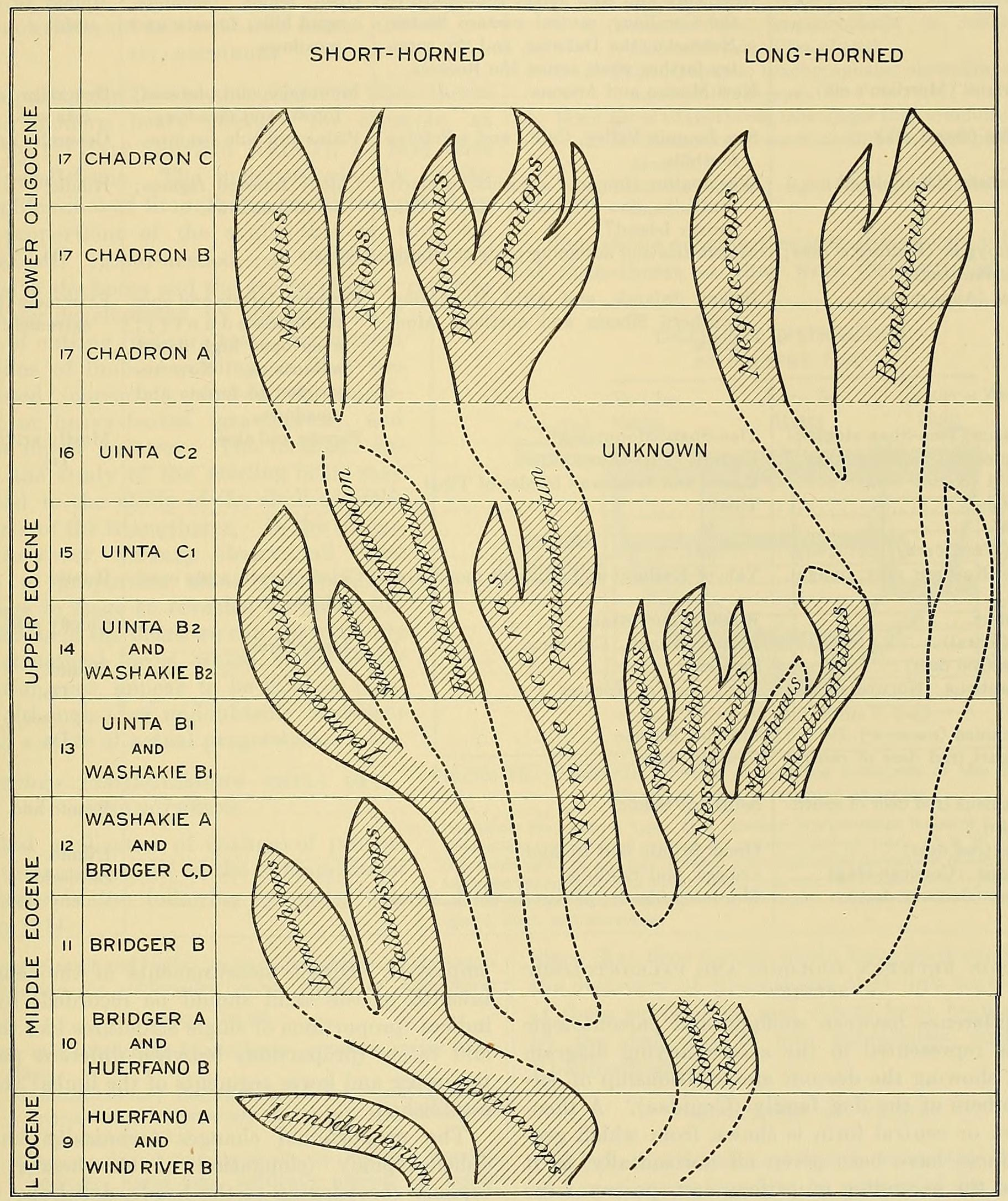
The discredited brontothere family tree imagined by Henry Fairfield Osborn in 1929

The first major systematic revision and overview of brontotheres was that of Osborn in 1929. Osborn's classification of brontotheres is generally considered to have oversplit both genera and higher-level clades, many of which were paraphyletic, and to have been influenced by orthogenesis. Osborn recognized twelve brontothere subfamilies, some of which were ancestral to others, and he believed that several brontothere lineages had independently evolved into the bulky and large horned forms of the Late Eocene. Osborn also believed that the Asian brontotheres represented a lineage distinct from the North American brontotheres. In 1943, Granger and Gregory agreed with this assessment, and suggested that Asian brontotheres shared a common ancestor with the North American forms as far back as Palaeosyops.

In the 1980s and 1990s, Mader worked to revise the phylogeny of North American brontotheres, but these attempts were not accompanied by species-level revisions and were unsupported by phylogenetic analyses. Mader divided brontotheres into two large subfamilies, Dolichorhininae and Brontotheriinae, with Eotitanops and Palaeosyops as basal sister taxa. Mader did not revise the Asian brontotheres. Mihlbachler's classification of brontotheres in 2008 was the first species-level revision of brontotheres to include both the North American and Asian forms, and the first large-scale classification scheme of brontotheres to be supported by a comprehensive phylogenetic analysis. Like Mader, Mihlbachler classified Eotitanops and Palaeosyops as basal sister taxa of the more derived brontotheres. Mader's "Dolichorhininae" was not recovered as a monophyletic group. Mihlbachler recognized a single brontothere subfamily, Brontotheriinae (all brontotheres other than Eotitanops and Palaeosyops). Brontotheriinae included several relatively basal genera and the more derived brontotheres of the tribe Brontotheriini, which in turn included several relatively basal genera and the derived brontothere subtribes Rhadinorhinina, Telmatheriina, and Brontotheriina. Mihlbachler's classification has seen continued use and support in phylogenetic analyses.

Brontothere systematics by various authors (20th–21st century)
| Osborn (1929) (mostly North American genera) | Granger & Gregory (1943) (only Mongolian genera) | Simpson (1945) | Mader (1998) (only North American genera) | McKenna & Bell (1997) | Mihlbachler (2008) |
|---|---|---|---|---|---|
| Family Titanotheriidae: Subfamily Lambdotheriinae; Lambdotherium; Subfamily Eotitanopinae; Eotitanops; Subfamily Palaeosyopinae; Limnohyops; Palaeosyops; Subfamily Dolichorhininae; Dolichorhinus; Eometarhinus; Mesatirhinus; Metarhinus; Sphenocoelus; Subfamily Telmatheriinae; Sthenodectes; Telmatherium; Subfamily Manteoceratinae; Brachydiastematherium; Manteoceras; Protitanotherium; Subfamily Rhadinorhininae; Rhadinorhinus; Subfamily Diplacodontinae; Diplacodon; Eotitanotherium; Subfamily Brontopinae; Diploclonus; Brontops; Teleodus; Subfamily Menodontinae; Allops; Menodus; Subfamily Brontotheriinae; Brontotherium; Subfamily Megaceropinae; Megacerops | Family Titanotheriidae: Subfamily Metatelmatheriinae; Desmatotitan; Hyotitan; Metatelmatherium; Subfamily Epimanteoceratinae; Dolichorhinoides; Epimanteoceras; Gnathotitan; Metatitan; Microtitan; Pachytitan; Parabrontops; Protitan; Subfamily Embolotheriinae; Embolotherium; Titanodectes | Family Brontotheriidae: Subfamily Lambdotheriinae; Lambdotherium; Subfamily Palaeosyopinae; Eotitanops; Limnohyops; Palaeosyops; Subfamily Dolichorhininae; Dolichorhinus; Eometarhinus; Mesatirhinus; Metarhinus; Rhadinorhinus; Sphenocoelus; Subfamily Telmatheriinae; Desmatotitan; Hyotitan; Metatelmatherium; Sivatitanops; Sthenodectes; Telmatherium; Subfamily Brontopinae; Brachydiastematherium; Brontops; Dolichorhinoides; Epimanteoceras; Gnathotitan; Manteoceras; Metatitan; Microtitan; Pachytitan; Parabrontops; Protitan; Protitanops; Protitanotherium; Rhinotitan; Teleodus; Subfamily Embolotheriinae; Embolotherium; Titanodectes; Subfamily Menodontinae; Diplacodon; Eotitanotherium; Menodus; Notiotitanops; Subfamily Brontotheriinae; Brontotherium; Megacerops | Family Brontotheriidae: Eotitanops; Palaeosyops; Subfamily Dolichorhininae; Sphenocoelus; Mesatirhinus; Subfamily Brontotheriinae; Telmatherium; "Diplacodonts" sensu lato; "Diplacodon" progressum; "Eubrontotheres"; Brontops; Duchesneodus; Megacerops; Menops | Family Brontotheriidae: Nanotitan; Pakotitanops; Subfamily Lambdotheriinae; Lambdotherium; Xenicohippus; Subfamily Palaesyopinae; Mulkrajanops; Palaeosyops; Subfamily Dolichorhininae; Mesatirhinus; Metarhinus; Sphenocoelus; Subfamily Telmatheriinae; Acrotitan; Arctotitan; Desmatotitan; Hyotitan; Sivatitanops; Sthenodectes; Telmatherium; Subfamily Brontopinae; Brachydiastematherium; Brontops; Dianotitan; Dolichorhinoides; Epimanteoceras; Gnathotitan; Metatitan; Microtitan; Oreinotherium; Pachytitan; Parabrontops; Protitan; Protitanops; Protitanotherium; Pygmaetitan; Rhinotitan; Subfamily Embolotheriinae; Embolotherium; Protembolotherium; Titanodectes; Subfamily Menodontinae; Ateleodon; Diplacodon; Eotitanotherium; Menodus; Notiotitanops; Subfamily Brontotheriinae; Brontotherium; Duchesneodus; Megacerops | Family Brontotheriidae: Eotitanops; Palaeosyops; Subfamily Brontotheriinae; Acrotitan; Bunobrontops; Desmatotitan; Dolichorhinus; Mesatirhinus; Sphenocoelus; Tribe Brontotheriini; Epimanteoceras; Microtitan; Nanotitanops; Sthenodectes; Subtribe Rhadinorhinina; Fossendorhinus; Metarhinus; Subtribe Telmatheriina; Telmatherium; Metatelmatherium; Wickia; Qufutitan; Subtribe Brontotheriina; Diplacodon; Pachytitan; Protitan; Protitanotherium; Rhinotitan; Infratribe Embolotheriita; Aktautitan; Brachydiastematherium; Embolotherium; Gnathotitan; Metatitan; Nasamplus; Pollyosbornia; Protembolotherium; Pygmaetitan; Infratribe Brontotheriita; Dianotitan; Duchesneodus; Eubrontotherium; Megacerops; Notiotitanops; Parabrontops; Protitanops |

The cladograms below show the primary strict reduced consensus tree from Mihlbachler's 2008 analysis, and the reduced strict consensus tree from a 2021 analysis by Mihlbachler and Donald Prothero:

Topology A: Mihlbachler (2008)

- Brontotheriidae
  - - Eotitanops
    - - cf. Eotitanops
      - - Palaeosyops
        - Brontotheriinae
          - Bunobrontops savagei
          - - Mesatirhinus junius
            - - Dolichorhinus hyognathus
              - - Desmatotitan tukhumensis
                - Acrotitan ulanshirehensis
              - - Sphenocoelus uintensis
                - Brontotheriini
                  - - Microtitan mongoliensis
                    - Rhadinorhinina
                      - Fossendorhinus diploconus
                      - - Metarhinus fluviatilis
                        - Metarhinus abbotti
                  - - Sthenodectes incisivum
                    - - Telmatheriina
                        - Telmatherium validus
                        - - Qufutitan zhoui
                          - - Wickia brevirhinus
                            - Metatelmatherium ultimum
                      - - Epimanteoceras formosus
                        - - Brontotheriina
                            - Protitan grangeri
                            - Protitan minor
                            - - Protitanotherium emarginatum
                              - - - Rhinotitan kaiseni
                                  - Rhinotitan andrewsi
                                - - Pachytitan ajax
                                  - Diplacodon elatus
                                  - Brontotheriita
                                    - Parabrontops gobiensis
                                    - Protitanops curryi
                                    - - Eubrontotherium clarnoensis
                                      - - Dianotitan lunanensis
                                        - Duchesneodus uintensis
                                        - - Megacerops coloradensis
                                          - Megacerops kuwagatarhinus
                                - Embolotheriita
                                  - - Aktautitan hippopotamopus
                                    - - Pollyosbornia altidens
                                      - Gnathotitan berkeyi
                                  - - Pygmaetitan panxianensis
                                    - - Brachydiastematherium transylvanicum
                                      - Metatitan khaitshinus
                                      - - Metatitan primus
                                        - Metatitan relictus
                                    - - Nasamplus progressus
                                      - - Protembolotherium efremovi
                                        - - Embolotherium andrewsi
                                          - Embolotherium grangeri

Topology B: Mihlbachler & Prothero (2021)

- Brontotheriidae
  - - Eotitanops
    - "cf. Eotitanops" (Eberle, 2006)
    - Eotitanops pakistanensis
    - - Palaeosyops
      - Brontotheriinae
        - Bunobrontops savagei
        - - Balochititanops haqi
          - - Mesatirhinus junius
            - - Dolichorhinus hyognathus
              - - Desmatotitan tukhumensis
                - Acrotitan ulanshirehensis
              - - Sphenocoelus uintensis
                - Brontotheriini
                  - - Microtitan mongoliensis
                    - Rhadinorhinina
                      - Fossendorhinus diploconus
                      - - Metarhinus pater
                        - Metarhinus fluviatilis
                        - Metarhinus abbotti
                  - - Sthenodectes incisivum
                    - - Telmatherium validus
                      - Qufutitan zhoui
                      - - Wickia brevirhinus
                        - Xylotitan cenosus
                        - Metatelmatherium ultimum
                      - - Epimanteoceras formosus
                        - - Brontotheriina
                            - Epimanteoceras mae
                            - - Protitan grangeri
                              - Protitan minor
                            - - Rhinotitan kaiseni
                              - - Rhinotitan andrewsi
                                - Brontotheriita
                                  - Parabrontops gobiensis
                                  - Eubrontotherium clarnoensis
                                  - Parvicornus occidentalis
                                  - - Protitanops curryi
                                    - - Dianotitan lunanensis
                                      - - Duchesneodus uintensis
                                        - - Megacerops coloradensis
                                          - Megacerops kuwagatarhinus
                                - Protitanotherium emarginatum
                                - Pachytitan ajax
                                - - Diplacodon elatus
                                  - Diplacodon gigan
                                - Embolotheriita
                                  - - Aktautitan hippopotamopus
                                    - - Pollyosbornia altidens
                                      - Gnathotitan berkeyi
                                  - - Pygmaetitan panxianensis
                                    - - Brachydiastematherium transylvanicum
                                      - Metatitan khaitshinus
                                      - - Metatitan primus
                                        - Metatitan relictus
                                    - - Nasamplus progressus
                                      - - Protembolotherium efremovi
                                        - - Embolotherium andrewsi
                                          - Embolotherium grangeri

== Evolutionary history ==
=== Origin and early brontotheres ===
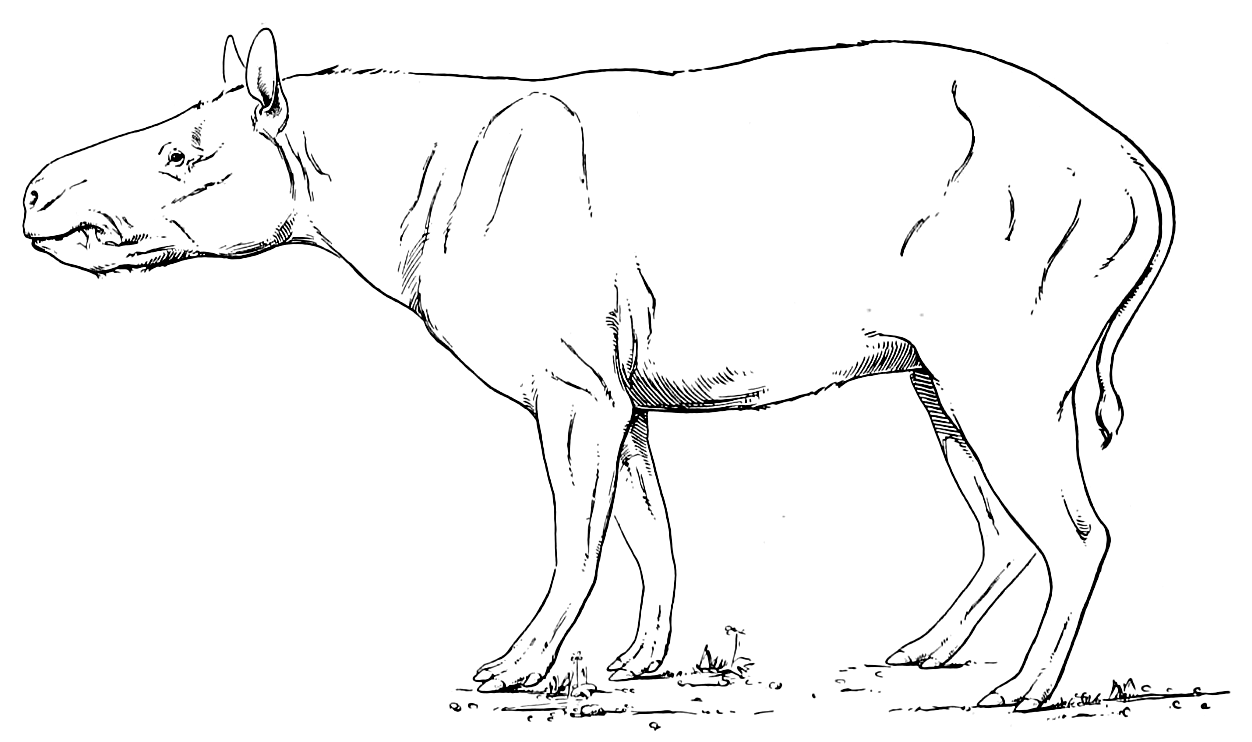
Life restoration of Eotitanops

Brontotheres originated in the Early Eocene, as part of the initial radition of the perissodactyls across the Holarctic realm. It is not clear whether brontotheres originated in North America or Asia, and either option has been favored at different times historically. In North America, the earliest and most primitive unequivocal brontothere is Eotitanops borealis, known from the earliest Bridgerian land mammal age (Br1a) of the Green River Basin. These deposits have been magnetostratigraphically correlated to the magnetochron C23R. In Asia, the earliest unequivocal brontotheres are Eotitanops pakistanensis and Balochititanops haqi, both known from deposits in the Ghazij Formation of Pakistan that have also been correlated to C23R.

Eotitanops is generally recovered as the basalmost (cladistically most primitive) brontothere in phylogenetic analyses. North American representatives of Eotitanops do not appear to be more derived than Asian representatives, or vice versa, and the earliest records on both continents are coeval in age. C23R corresponds to about 52.5–51.5 million years ago.

It is likely that the earliest intercontinental migration of brontotheres, whichever direction it took, coincided with the Early Eocene Climatic Optimum. Phylogenetic analyses imply more than one migration event during the early evolutionary history of the brontotheres, since both Eotitanops and the slightly more derived Palaeosyops are known from both Asia and North America. Fossils of both Eotitanops and Palaeosyops have been found on Ellesmere Island, Canada, within the Arctic Archipelago, which indicates that early brontotheres were able to survive in a range of different environments. The Ellesmere Island Eotitanops fossils are dated to the late Wasatchian, c. 53–52 million years, and is thus possibly the earliest occurrence of the genus.

The earliest brontotheres and their closest relatives were small animals. The rapid increase in size that the brontotheres experienced over the course of the Eocene is one of the most extreme size increases recorded in all of mammalian evolutionary history. Presumed close relatives of brontotheres, Danjiangia and Lambdotherium, were smaller than any known brontothere, and are estimated to have weighed 17.8 kilograms (39 lb) and 35.5 kilograms (78 lb), respectively. The earliest unequivocal brontotheres were only slightly larger, with Eotitanops estimated at 91.5 kilograms (202 lb) and Balochititanops at 65.3 kilograms (144 lb). Palaeosyops, which eventually fully replaced Eotitanops, was substantially larger than Eotitanops and Balochititanops, at 408.5 kilograms (901 lb).

=== Diversification ===
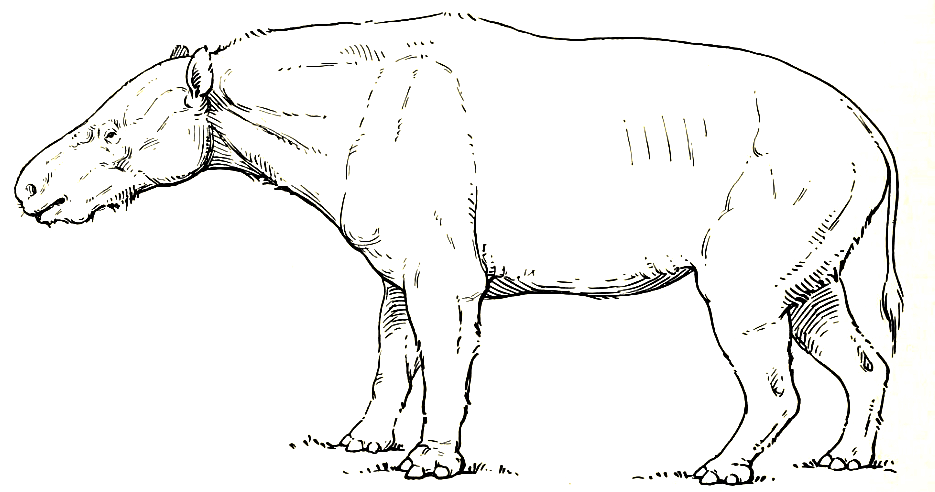
Life restoration of Dolichorhinus

Brontotheres diversified extensively and rapidly in North America in the Uintan to Chadronian land mammal ages, and in the comparative timeframe in Asia (Irdinmanhan to Ergilian). Several lineages of brontotheres coexisted at the same time. There was a general trend towards larger body sizes, though some lineages also developed into small-bodied forms, such as Nanotitanops and Xylotitan. Brontothere diversity was at its highest in the Middle Eocene c. 45–40 million years ago, corresponding to the Uintan in North America. At their peak, brontotheres were the most diverse clade of large mammals on both continents. Brontotheres may have been most diverse in Asia.

There was little independent adaptive radiation of brontotheres in Asia or North America. Based on the phylogenetic relationships in the group, several brontothere lineages must have migrated across Beringia several times. Brontothere phylogeny implies as many as 9–12 intercontinental migration events in the Middle Eocene. Like the basal Eotitanops and Palaeosyops, some derived brontothere genera had intercontinental distributions, such as Metatelmatherium and Eubrontotherium.

Horned brontotheres are first known from the Irdinmanhan in Asia, and the earliest and most primitive known representative of this lineage is Protitan. Horned brontotheres appear to have replaced the hornless brontothere fauna. In North America, hornless brontotheres were diverse in the Uintan, represented by genera such as Dolichorhinus, Metatelmatherium, Metarhinus, Sphenocoelus, and Sthenodectes, but do not occur in the later Duchesnean and Chadronian land mammal ages. Horned brontotheres continued to increase in body size over the course of the rest of the Eocene, and their horns developed into a wide range of different sizes and shapes. The largest horned brontotheres were among the largest land mammals of the Eocene. Among the largest brontotheres were genera such as Embolotherium and Megacerops, which may have surpassed four tonnes in weight.

=== Extinction ===
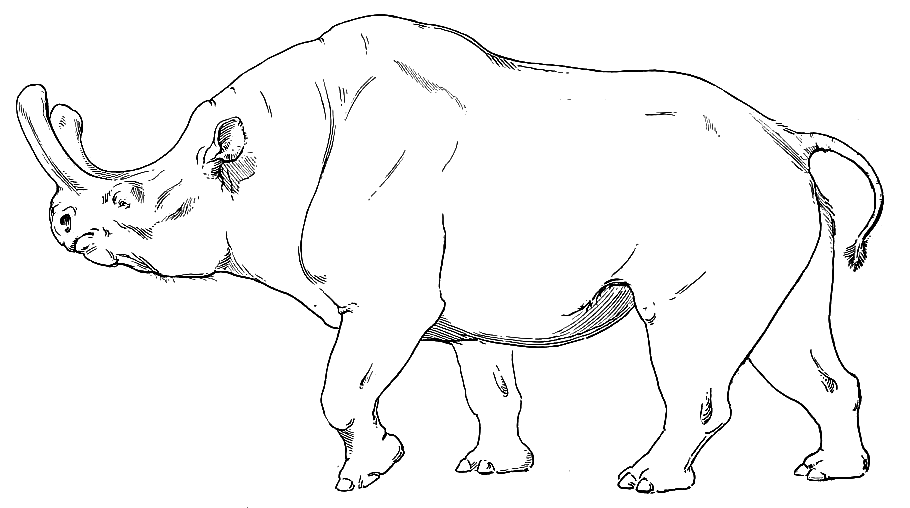
Life restoration of Megacerops

The brontotheres went extinct at the end of the Eocene. In many historical treatments of brontotheres, the last horned brontotheres were erroneously dated to the Early Oligocene, which left the cause of their extinction a mystery. They are now considered to have been one of several mammal groups that went extinct in the Eocene–Oligocene extinction event. Based on the size and development of the last known living brontotheres, such as Megacerops and Embolotherium, the brontotheres apparently died out when they were at the peak of their evolutionary development.

Osborn believed that the brontotheres had died out due to overadaptation and "racial senescence", and that they represented an example of evolution "out of control" and unrestrained by natural selection, speculating that their horns grew too large and cumbersome. This is clearly wrong, since brontothere horns were fully functional for millions of years, including in the last living members of the group. It is also unlikely that brontotheres were outcompeted by another group, since no contemporary mammals were similar in size and no new comparable mammals are known from the Early Oligocene.

The Eocene–Oligocene extinction event was caused by a period of glaciation, which dramatically impacted vegetation across the planet. The large and humid forests that had characterized the Eocene were replaced on a large scale by savanna environments. As inferred from their low-crowned cheek teeth, brontotheres fed on the soft vegetation of the forests, and were not adapted to the drier and harsher climate that characterized the Early Oligocene.

After their extinction, the ecological niche of the brontotheres would eventually be taken over by rhinocerotoids and proboscideans. The largest brontotheres were surpassed in size in the Middle Oligocene by the paraceratheres, such as the enormous Paraceratherium. Paraceratheres did not reach North America, where brontotheres were not surpassed in size until the appearance of the mastodons in the Miocene.

== Paleobiology ==
=== Diet ===
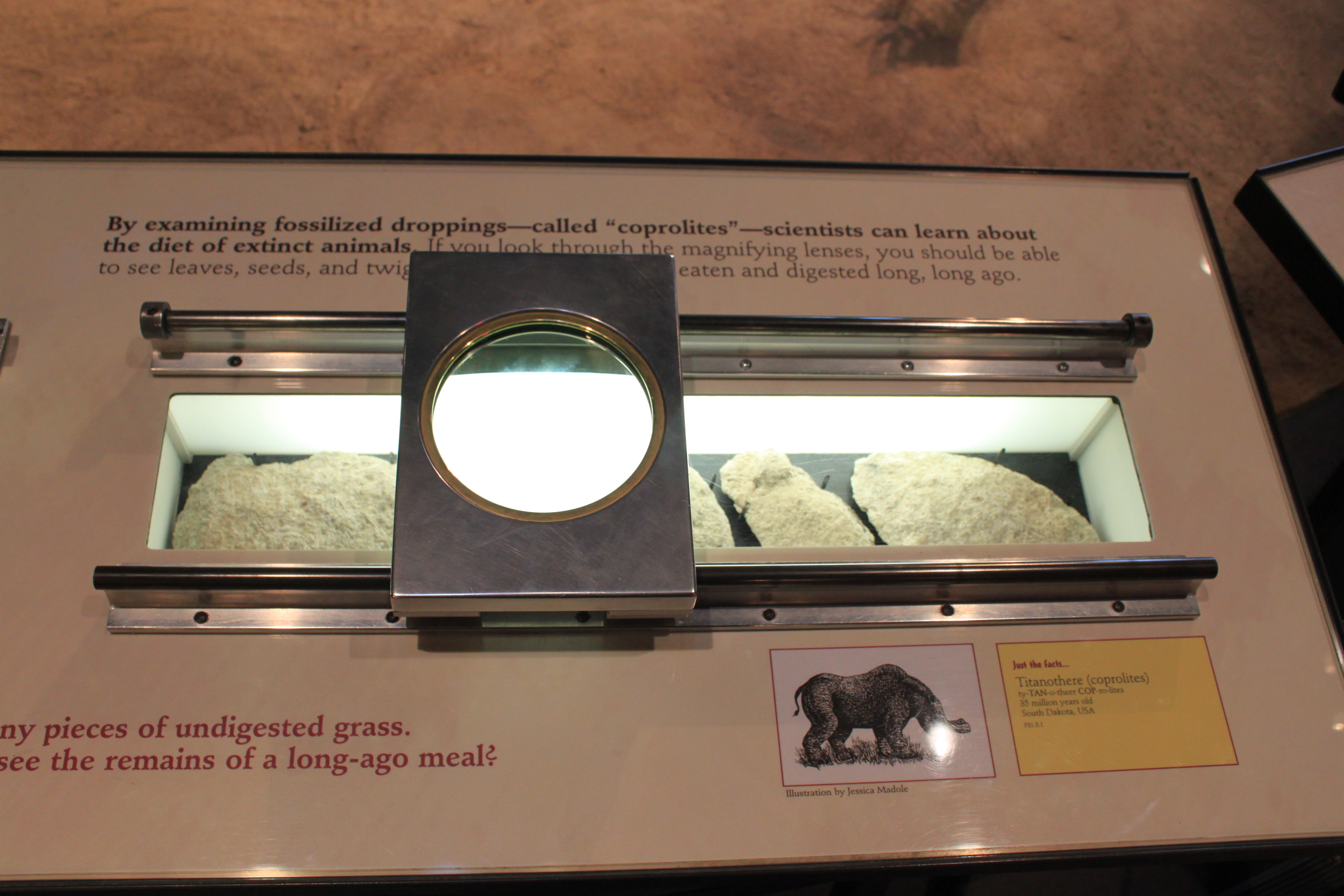
Brontothere coprolites at the Science Museum of Minnesota

Brontotheres were specialized megaherbivores. Their tooth morphology indicates that all brontotheres were browsers. Brontotheres are traditionally interpreted as selective folivores and frugivores. Microwear patterns on brontothere molars suggest that their diet was similar to that of modern moose and black rhinoceroses, which feed mostly on leaves and other fibrous woody material.

Brontothere teeth changed over the course of their evolution, most notably in that earlier brontotheres had brachydont (low-crowned) cheek teeth with thick enamel, whereas later species had more hypsodont (high-crowned) cheek teeth, with thinner enamel. Relatively speaking, the teeth of late brontotheres remained quite low-crowned, and microwear patterns of brontothere teeth do not suggest any change in diet despite slight changes in tooth morphology.

=== Social behavior ===
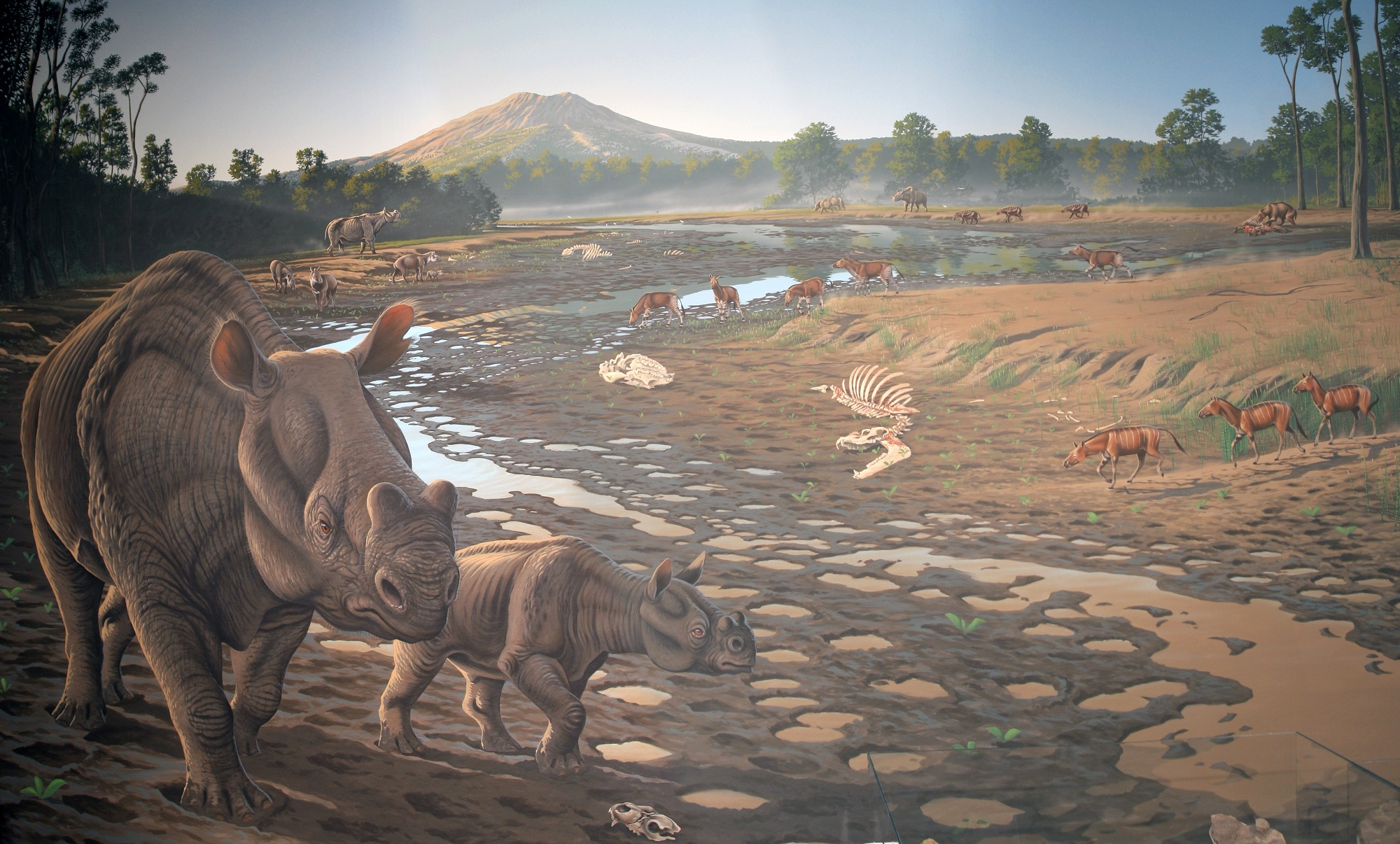
Life restoration of Eubrontotherium (left) and other contemporary animals

Monospecific mass death assemblages, i.e. bone beds with associated fossils belonging to just one species, have been found of some brontothere genera, including Duchesneodus, Metarhinus, and Megacerops. Smaller associated samples with several individuals are known from a few other genera, including Embolotherium and Eubrontotherium. Mass death assemblages provide valuable data for the variability within brontothere populations. Mass death assemblages have historically been interpreted as evidence that brontotheres lived in herds; this is no longer considered certain, since mass death assemblages of living ungulates are not always indicative of herd behavior.

The horns of horned brontotheres probably had a social function, at least in part; although there is no direct evidence, horns are believed to have been used for intraspecific combat, display purposes, and for species identification. Indirect evidence of intraspecific combat exists in the form of secondary bone growth on some fossil horns, perhaps due to clashes with other brontotheres, and through rib injuries in some Megacerops specimens which realistically could only have been caused by other Megacerops.

=== Sexual dimorphism ===
Intraspecific variation consistent with sexual dimorphism has been documented in several brontothere species. Variations in the overall robustness of the body and skull, and variations in the size of canines and incisors, have been interpreted as the result of sexual dimorphism in several species. Fossil samples with several associated individuals have been valuable in studying the effects of sexual dimorphism, since it can rule out that variation due to species or genus-level differences.

In some, but not all, horned brontotheres, the size and robustness of the horns varied between individuals. This has also been attributed to sexual dimorphism, something which is further supported by horn and tusk size being sexually dimorphic in many modern ungulates.

== See also ==
- Astrapotheria – an extinct South American mammal order named "lightning beasts" in allusion to the brontotheres
- Embrithopoda – an extinct ungulate mammal order with superficial resemblance to brontotheres
