= Microtitan =

Microtitan Temporal range: Middle Eocene (Irdinmanhan), 47.8–42.7 Ma

Scientific classification
- Kingdom: Animalia
- Phylum: Chordata
- Class: Mammalia
- Order: Perissodactyla
- Family: †Brontotheriidae
- Genus: †Microtitan
- Species: †M. mongoliensis

Binomial name
- †Microtitan mongoliensis Granger and Gregory, 1943

Extinct genus of mammals

Microtitan is a genus of brontothere from the Ulan Shireh Formation.

== Description ==
Microtitan is small compared to other contemporary brontotheres, being similar in size to Metarhinus. The premolars of Microtitan are compressed, while the molars are elongated. The genus is almost entirely known from the cheek teeth, as well as mandibular and maxillary remains. There is no indication of the specialization of the rostrum as seen in Dolichorhinus or Metarhinus. The upper canines of Microtitan are moderately sized.

== Classification ==
The fragmentary nature of Microtitan has caused it to have a convoluted classification history. The holotype specimen of the genus, AMNH 20167, (ascribed to the species M. mongoliensis) has been considered a composite specimen (meaning material came from multiple individuals) and not fitting to be a diagnostic specimen. A neotype, AMNH 22099, is currently ascribed to the species by Granger and Gregory (1943). Other species assigned to the genus have been considered dubious.

Currently the genus is grouped within the subfamily Brontotheriinae, close to Metarhinus.
