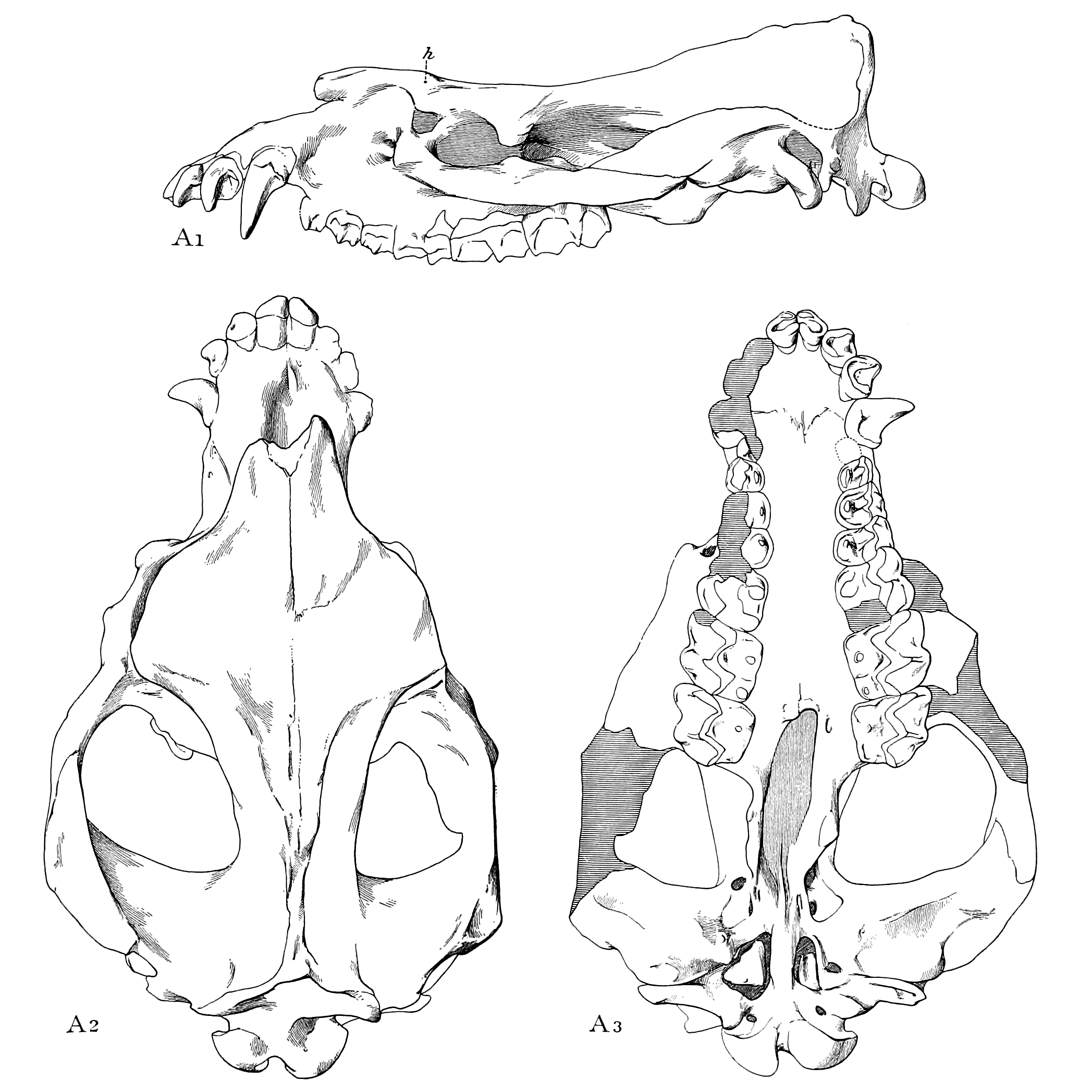
- Illustration of the type skull of Sthenodectes incisivum

Scientific classification
- Kingdom: Animalia
- Phylum: Chordata
- Class: Mammalia
- Infraclass: Placentalia
- Order: Perissodactyla
- Family: †Brontotheriidae
- Genus: †Sthenodectes; Gregory, 1912

Species
- S. incisivum Douglass 1909

= Sthenodectes =

Sthenodectes Temporal range: Middle Eocene (middle Uintan), 45.7–42.8 Ma

Extinct genus of mammals

Sthenodectes is a genus of brontothere endemic to North America.
