= Xylotitan =

Xylotitan Temporal range: Middle Eocene

Scientific classification
- Kingdom: Animalia
- Phylum: Chordata
- Class: Mammalia
- Order: Perissodactyla
- Family: †Brontotheriidae
- Genus: †Xylotitan
- Species: †X. cenosus

Binomial name
- †Xylotitan cenosus Mihlbachler & Samuels, 2016

Extinct genus of mammals

Xylotitan is an extinct genus of brontotheriid that lived in Oregon during the Middle Eocene. It contains the species X. cenosus.
