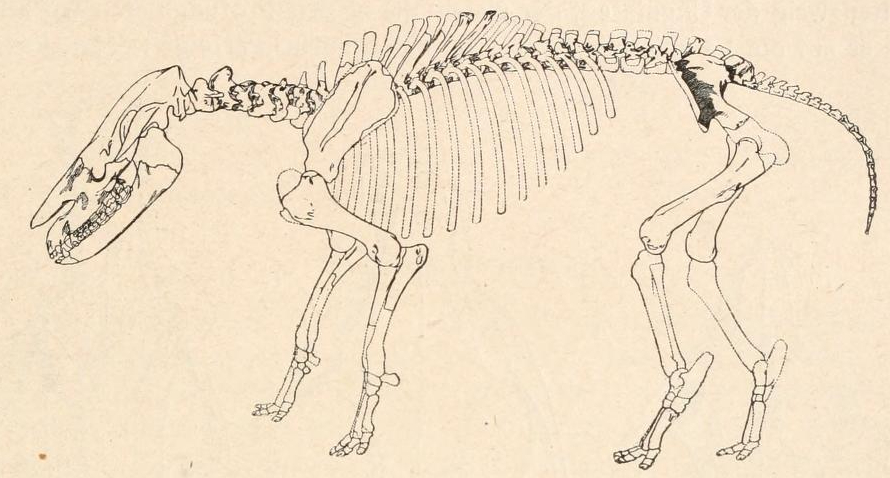
- Skeletal reconstruction of Sphenocoelus sp.

Scientific classification
- Kingdom: Animalia
- Phylum: Chordata
- Class: Mammalia
- Order: Perissodactyla
- Family: †Brontotheriidae
- Genus: †Sphenocoelus; Osborn, 1895

Species
- S. uintensis (Osborn, 1895)

= Sphenocoelus =

Sphenocoelus Temporal range: Middle Eocene (early Uintan), 46.3–45.7 Ma

Extinct genus of mammals

Sphenocoelus is an extinct genus of brontothere known from North America during the Middle Eocene.

== Description ==
Sphenocoelus is an average-sized brontothere, with a dolichocephalic skull. Some specimens of Sphenocoelus bear a prominent sagittal crests, though others lack them entirely. The molars are long and narrow, and the third and fourth premolars have a cusp on the posterior medial (central hind) portion of the tooth. They bear four digits on the forefeet.

== Classification ==
Sphenocoelus has had a complicated classification history, with many genera being split off or lumped within the group at various times. Currently, Sphenocoelus is placed within Brontotheriidae. The genus Dolichorhinus was once considered a species of Sphenocoelus, S. hyognathus, but is now in its own genus.
