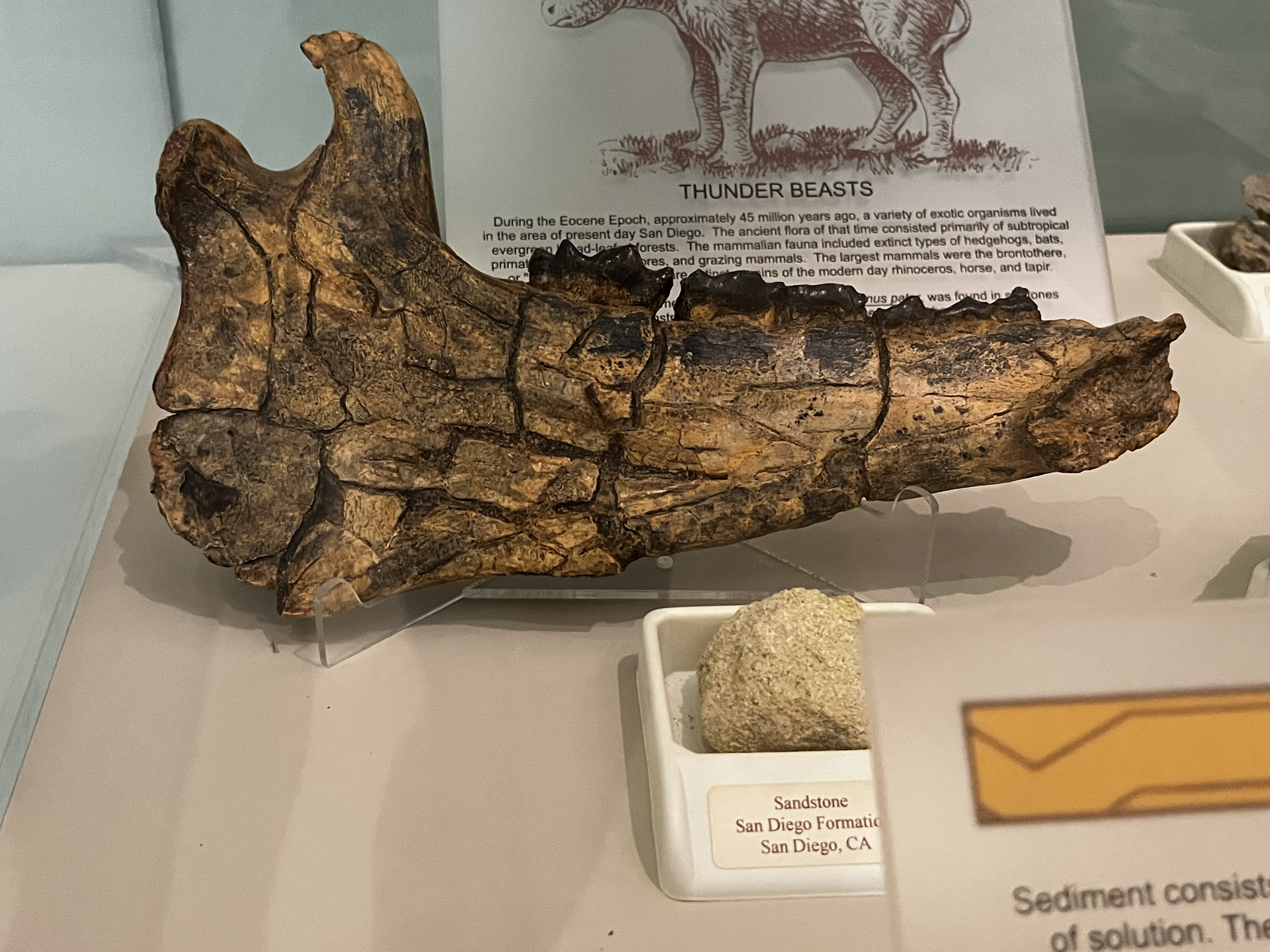
- Metarhinus jaw at Mission Trails Regional Park visitor center

Scientific classification
- Kingdom: Animalia
- Phylum: Chordata
- Class: Mammalia
- Order: Perissodactyla
- Family: †Brontotheriidae
- Genus: †Metarhinus; Osborn, 1908

Type species
- Metarhinus fluviatilis Osborn, 1908

Species
- M. abbotti (Riggs, 1912); M. fluviatilis (Osborn, 1908); M. pater (Stock, 1937)

Synonyms
- Telmatherium accola (Cook, 1926); Telmatherium advocata (Cook, 1926); Metarhinus riparius (Riggs, 1912); Metarhinus cristatus (Riggs, 1912); Metarhinus earlei (Riggs, 1912); Heterotitanops parvus (Peterson, 1914)

= Metarhinus =

Metarhinus Temporal range: Middle Eocene (early–middle Uintan), 46.3–42.8 Ma

Extinct genus of mammals

Metarhinus is a genus of brontothere endemic to North America. It lived during the Eocene, in the early and middle Uintan land mammal age.

== Description ==
In terms of dentition, Metarhinus had rather primitive morphology. The genus bears enlarged canines and diagonal premolars. The molars of adult specimens are deeply worn, and the skull has an elongated and high sagittal crest. In both jaws there is a short post-canine diastema. Different species of Metarhinus have unique nasal mophologies, with M. fluvialtilis having spoon-shaped nasals and M. diploconus having tapered nasals. This unique anatomical trait has been suggested to indicate that Metarhinus had an advanced sense of smell.

== Classification ==
Like other basal brontotheres, Metarhinus has a very rocky taxonomic history. The validity of species assigned to Metarhinus is often debated, with species formerly assigned to Metarhinus often being moved to related genera or being grouped within other Metarhinus species.
