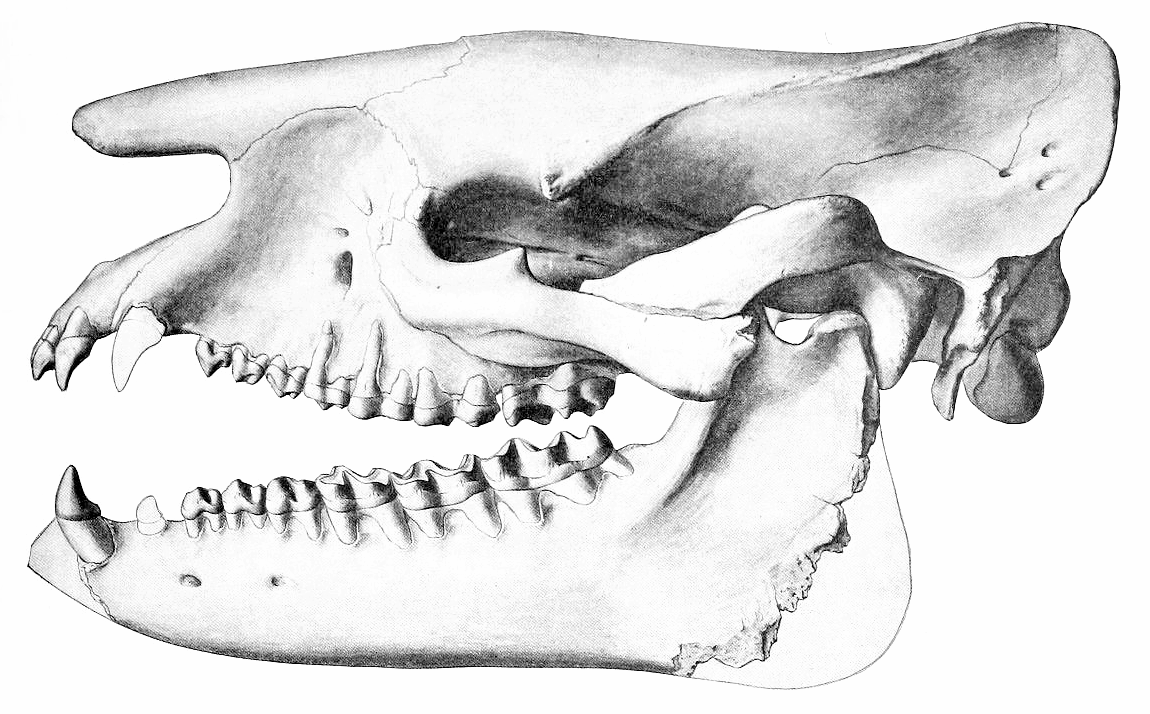
- Skull of M. ultimum

Scientific classification
- Kingdom: Animalia
- Phylum: Chordata
- Class: Mammalia
- Order: Perissodactyla
- Family: †Brontotheriidae
- Subfamily: †Brontotheriinae
- Genus: †Metatelmatherium; Granger and Gregory, 1943

= Metatelmatherium =

Metatelmatherium Temporal range: Middle Eocene (late Uintan), 42.8–40.1 Ma

Extinct genus of mammals

Metatelmatherium is a genus of brontothere found in North America and eastern Asia.
