= Balochititanops =

Balochititanops Temporal range: Early Eocene, Ypresian

Scientific classification
- Kingdom: Animalia
- Phylum: Chordata
- Class: Mammalia
- Infraclass: Placentalia
- Order: Perissodactyla
- Family: †Brontotheriidae
- Genus: †Balochititanops; Missiaen, Gunnell & Gingerich, 2011
- Species: †B. haqi

Binomial name
- †Balochititanops haqi Missiaen et al., 2011

Balochititanops is an extinct genus of brontotheriid perissodactyl from late Early Eocene (Ypresian stage) deposits of Pakistan. Balochititanops is known from the holotype GSP-UM 6532, right maxilla with teeth, from Kingri area, Balochistan. Many referred materials are known and include cranial and postcranial remains. All specimens were collected from numerous localities in Balochistan and northwestern Frontier Province, from the uppermost part of the Ghazij Formation. It was first named by Pieter Missiaen, Gregg F. Gunnell and Philip D. Gingerich in 2011 and the type species is Balochititanops haqi. It represents one of the oldest Asian brontotheres.
