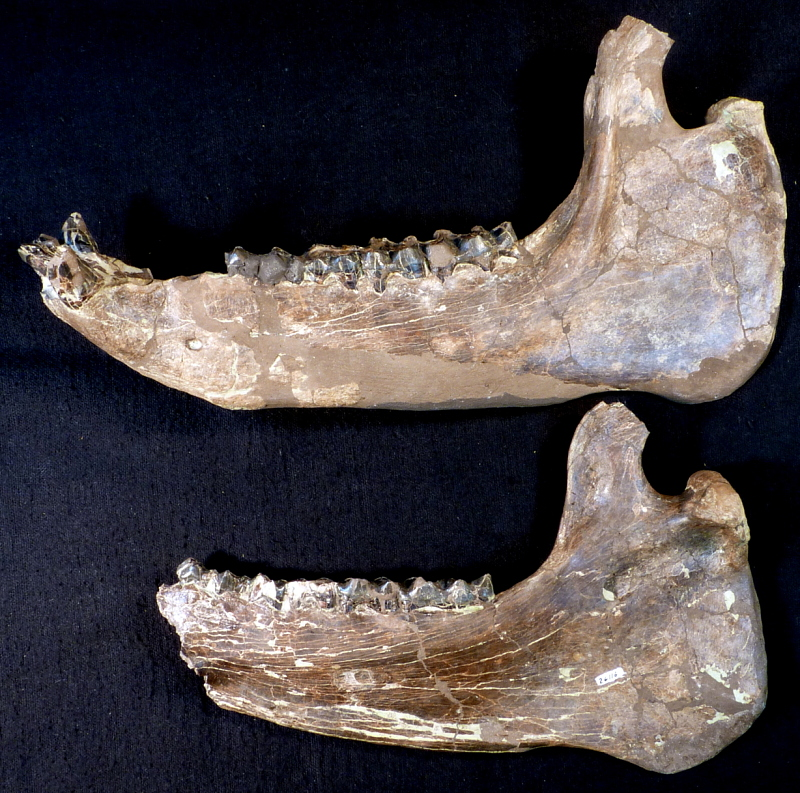
- Mandible of M. junius

Scientific classification
- Kingdom: Animalia
- Phylum: Chordata
- Class: Mammalia
- Order: Perissodactyla
- Family: †Brontotheriidae
- Genus: †Mesatirhinus; Osborn, 1908

Type species
- Mesatirhinus junius (Leidy, 1872)

Species
- M. junius (Leidy, 1872)

Synonyms
- M. megarhinus (Earle, 1891); M. petersoni (Osborn, 1908)

= Mesatirhinus =

Mesatirhinus Temporal range: Early–Middle Eocene (middle–late Bridgerian), 49.2–46.3 Ma

Extinct genus of mammals

Mesatirhinus is a genus of brontothere endemic to North America during the Eocene.

== Description ==
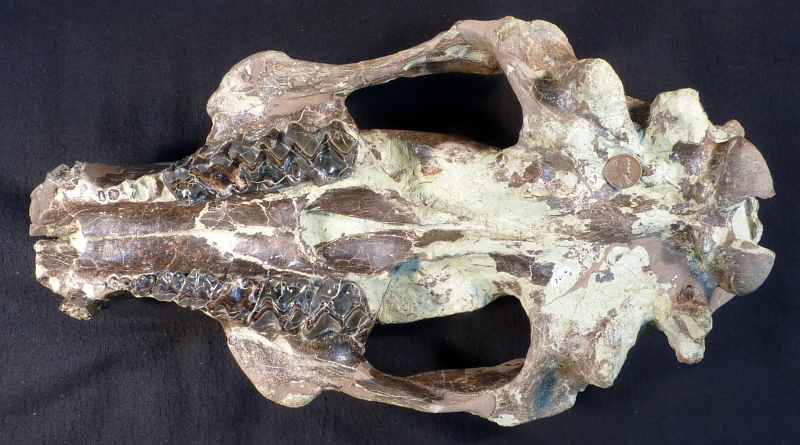
Cranium of M. junius

Mesatirhinus was distinct morphologically from the other brontotheres in its subfamily, lacking many autapomorphies indicative of the group. The Nasal bones are moderately flared distally, and the suborbital protuberance is enlarged. Similar to other brontotheres, there is a postcanine diastema, though it is not as pronounced as in later genera. The skull possesses a sagittal crest, similar to other basal titanotheres. This crest acts as an anchor for the masitcatory muscles.

== Classification ==
Mesatirhinus was named by Henry Fairfield Osborn. It is assigned to the family Brontotheriidae and was placed in the subfamily Dolichorhininae by Mader (1998). While Mesatirhinus is currently considered monospecific, historically other species have been assigned to the genus. Some of these species have been moved to related genera, such as Sphenocoelus.
