= Dolichorhinus =

Dolichorhinus Temporal range: Middle Eocene (middle Uintan), 45.7–42.8 Ma
- Skeleton of D. hyognathus.

Scientific classification
- Kingdom: Animalia
- Phylum: Chordata
- Class: Mammalia
- Order: Perissodactyla
- Family: †Brontotheriidae
- Subfamily: †Brontotheriinae
- Genus: †Dolichorhinus; Hatcher, 1895
- Species: †D. hyognathus

Binomial name
- †Dolichorhinus hyognathus (Osborn, 1889)

Synonyms
- Synonyms of D. hyognathus: Dolichorhinus cornutum (Osborn, 1895); Dolichorhinus intermedius Osborn, 1908; Dolichorhinus heterodon Douglass, 1909; Dolichorhinus longiceps Douglass, 1909; Dolichorhinus superior (Riggs, 1912); Dolichorhinus fluminalis Riggs, 1912

Extinct genus of mammals

Dolichorhinus is an extinct genus of brontothere, known from the Middle Eocene (Uintan) of North America. Several species have been named historically, but only one species is recognized as valid today, D. hyognathus.

== Description ==
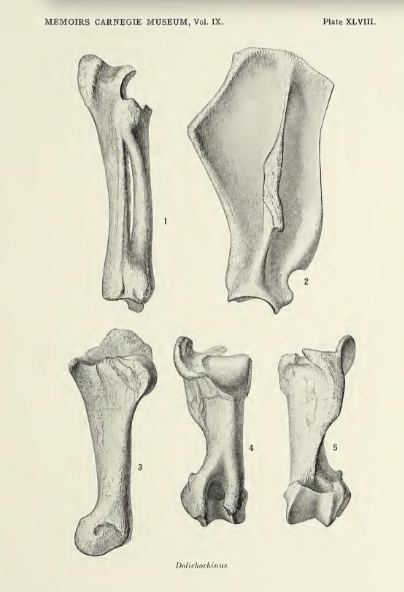
Forelimb bones of Dolichorhinus

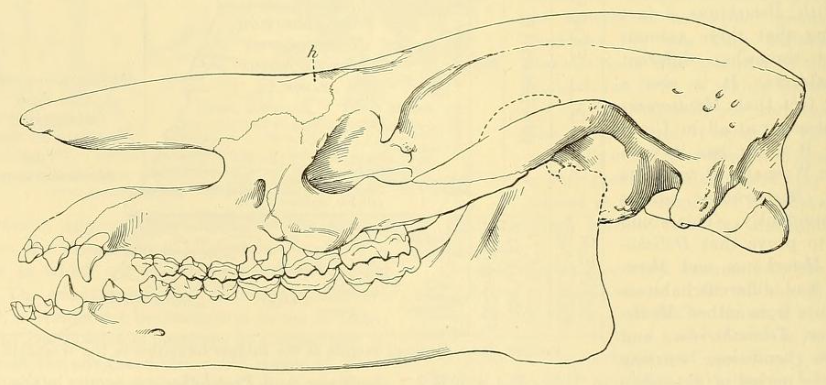
Skull of Dolichorhinus

The cranium of Dolichorhinus is flattened at the top, similar to Palaeosyops. Unlike Palaeosyops, however, Dolichorhinus had slender zygomata and was dolichocephalic. The tooth morphology of Dolichorhinus suggests it consumed small, hardy plants. The nasal morphology of Dolichorhinus suggests it had an enhanced sense of smell. Above the orbits, there is a small protuberance, and the skull lacks a noticeable sagittal crest. The upper incisors of Dolichorhinus are sub-caniniform, and there is a noticeable post-canine diastema. Similar to the condition in horses, Dolichorhinus has a coossified radius and ulna, as well as a partially coossified tibia and fibula.

== Classification ==
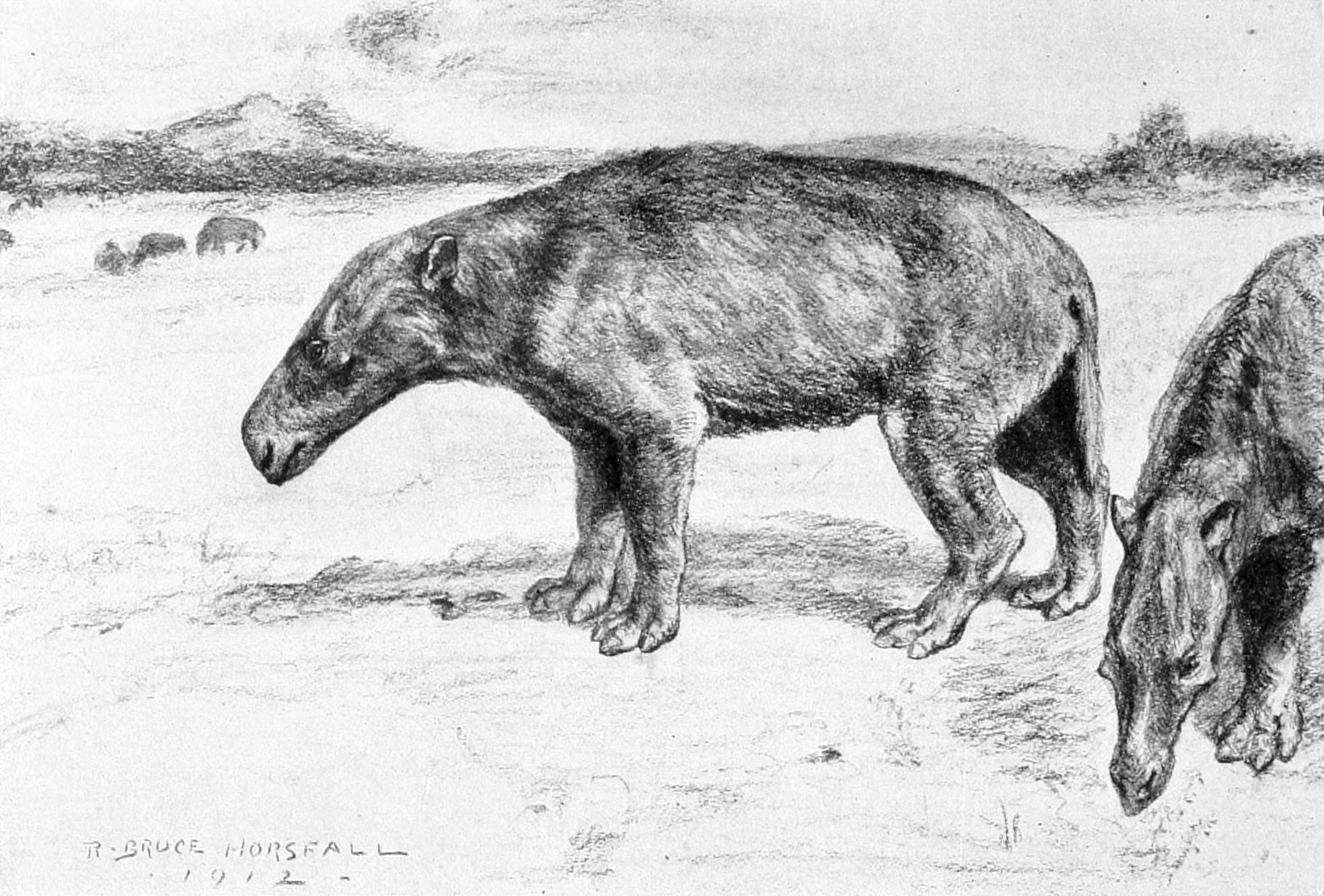
Life reconstruction of Dolichorhinus hyognathus (formerly Sphenocoelus intermedius and Mesatirhinus superior)

Dolichorhinus is placed within the subfamily Brontotheriinae. Historically, many species have been assigned to Dolichorhinus, though many have been assigned to other genera or synonymized with D. hyognathus. Dolichorhinus itself has been considered a synonym of the related Sphenocoelus by some authors, though most recent literature disputes this.
