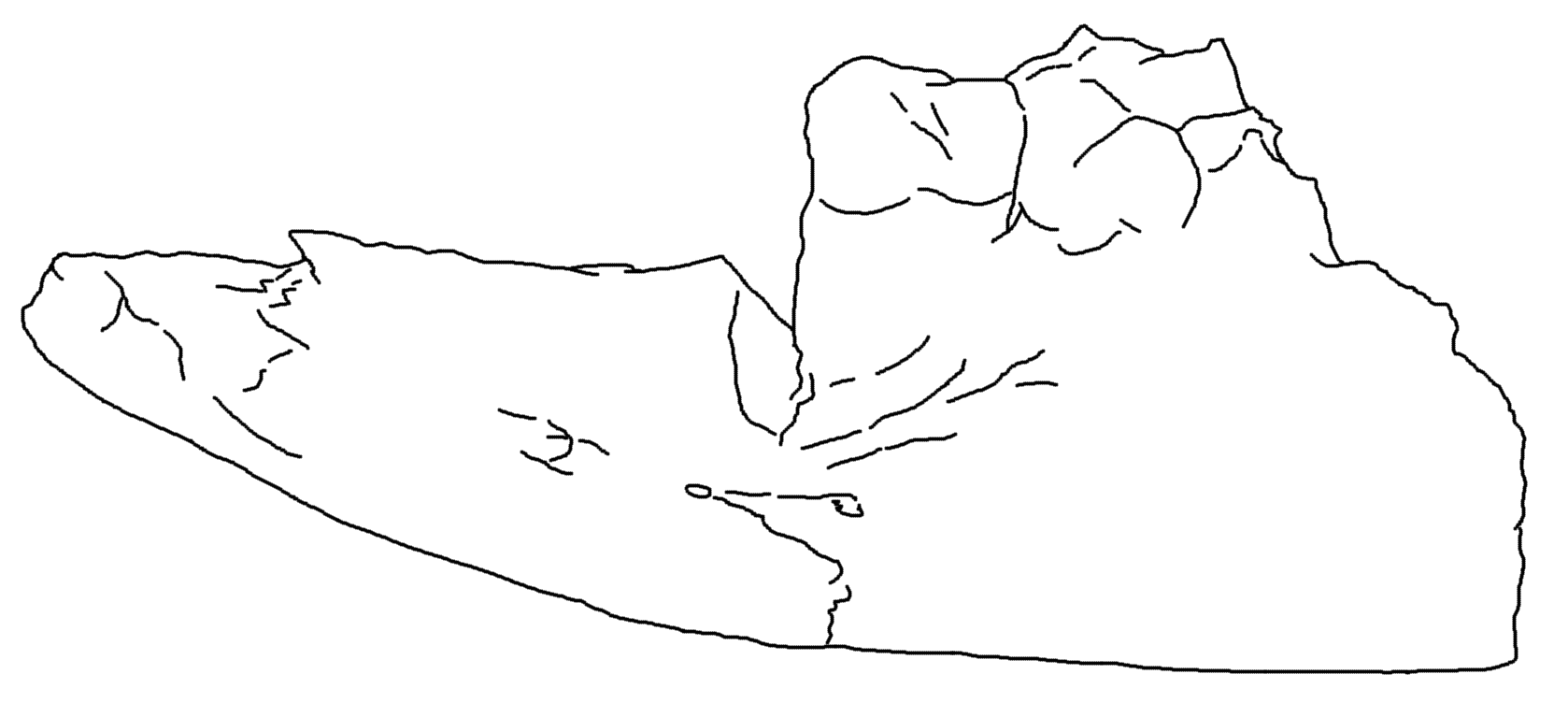
- Drawing of the A. ulanshirehensis type specimen (IVPP V.6686)

Scientific classification
- Kingdom: Animalia
- Phylum: Chordata
- Class: Mammalia
- Order: Perissodactyla
- Family: †Brontotheriidae
- Subfamily: †Brontotheriinae
- Genus: †Acrotitan; Ye, 1983
- Species: †A. ulanshirehensis

Binomial name
- †Acrotitan ulanshirehensis Ye, 1983

= Acrotitan =

Acrotitan Temporal range: Middle Eocene (Irdinmanhan), 47.8–42.7 Ma

Extinct genus of mammals

Acrotitan (lit. 'high titan') is an extinct genus of brontothere that lived in East Asia during the Middle Eocene, in the Irdinmanhan land mammal age. The genus contains a single species, A. ulanshirehensis, known from a single partial mandible found in the Ulan Shireh Formation of Inner Mongolia, China.

Acrotitan was a small brontothere, estimated to have reached a body mass of 544 kilograms (1,199 lb). Acrotitan is distinguished from other brontotheres by several features, most notably its long and narrow mandibular symphysis and its reduced number of lower incisors.

== Research history ==
Acrotitan ulanshirehensis was described by Ye Jie in 1983, based on a partial mandible (IVPP V.6686). The mandible preserves only two of the teeth, the left third and fourth premolars. IVPP V.6686 also preserves the alveoli (tooth sockets) of the preceding teeth (first incisor to second premolar). IVPP V.6686 was found in the Ulan Shireh Formation of Inner Mongolia, China.

Ye compared IVPP V.6686 to Metatelmatherium and Desmatotitan, with which it shares strongly developed cingula on the premolars and diastemas (gaps between teeth) between the canine and the first premolar, and between the first and second premolar. The arrangement of the incisors, in a A-shaped arch, differs from Metatelmatherium, where they were arranged in a semicircular arch. Compared to Desmatotitan, the incisors of Acrotitan were relatively smaller. According to Ye, the most important feature distinguishing Acrotitan from Desmatotitan and Metatelmatherium, and all other brontotheres, is a long and narrow mandibular symphysis.

Ye made several errors in his short description of Acrotitan. He erroneously described the mandibular symphysis as extending to the anterior (forward) edge of the second premolar, while it actually extends even longer, to the anterior edge of the third premolar. Ye described the lower dental formula as 3.1.4.3, whereas the alveoli actually indicate only two pairs of lower incisors, and no molars or molar alveoli are preserved. The correct lower dental formula is thus 2.1.4.?. The reduced number of lower incisors is another important distinguishing feature; the only other brontothere genus with only two pairs of lower incisors is the considerably more derived Megacerops.

== Description ==
Acrotitan was a small brontothere. In 2023, Oscar Sanisidro, Matthew C. Mihlbachler, and Juan L. Cantalapiedra estimated A. ulanshirehensis to have weighed 544 kilograms (1,199 lb).

Acrotitan had the lower jaw dental formula 2.1.4.?. The lower jaw was robust, and the mandibular symphysis extended back to the anterior side of the third pair of premolars. The alveolus of the canine indicates that the canines were large and robust. There was an unusually long diastema between the canines and first pair of premolars, but diastema length is variable in many brontothere species and this might thus not have been a species-wide trait. There was also a diastema between the first and second pairs of premolars, which other similarly sized brontotheres lack. Based on its alveolus, the first lower premolar appears to have been slanted forwards. The third and fourth pair of premolars were short and broad, and had well-developed cingula.

== Classification ==
Paleontologists working on brontotheres in Asia in the latter half of the 20th century generally based their taxonomy on a 1943 revision of Asian brontotheres by Walter W. Granger and William King Gregory. Using Granger and Gregory's taxonomy, Ye classified Acrotitan in the brontothere subfamily Metatelmatheriinae due to its similarities to Desmatotitan and Metatelmatherium. As defined by Granger and Gregory, Metatelmatheriinae included Desmatotitan, Hyotitan, and Metatelmatherium. In addition to the features noted by Ye, a close relationship to Desmatotitan is also suggested by the slanted first lower premolar, a feature which is also seen in the type specimen Desmatotitan tukhumensis (AMNH 21606).

Granger and Gregory's taxonomy is now considered obsolete, and unsupported by phylogenetics. Modern phylogenetic analyses recover Metatelmatherium as considerably more derived than Desmatotitan, but support Acrotitan and Desmatotitan as sister taxa, and as relatively basal members of the subfamily Brontotheriinae. The cladogram below shows the strict reduced consensus from a 2021 study by Mihlbachler and Donald Prothero:

- Brontotheriidae
  - - Eotitanops
    - "cf. Eotitanops" (Eberle, 2006)
    - Eotitanops pakistanensis
    - - Palaeosyops
      - Brontotheriinae
        - Bunobrontops savagei
        - - Balochititanops haqi
          - - Mesatirhinus junius
            - - Dolichorhinus hyognathus
              - - Desmatotitan tukhumensis
                - Acrotitan ulanshirehensis
              - - Sphenocoelus uintensis
                - Brontotheriini
                  ⊞
                  - - Microtitan mongoliensis
                    - Rhadinorhinina
                      - Fossendorhinus diploconus
                      - - Metarhinus pater
                        - Metarhinus fluviatilis
                        - Metarhinus abbotti
                  - - Sthenodectes incisivum
                    - - Telmatherium validus
                      - Qufutitan zhoui
                      - - Wickia brevirhinus
                        - Xylotitan cenosus
                        - Metatelmatherium ultimum
                      - - Epimanteoceras formosus
                        - - Brontotheriina
                            - Epimanteoceras mae
                            - - Protitan grangeri
                              - Protitan minor
                            - - Rhinotitan kaiseni
                              - - Rhinotitan andrewsi
                                - Brontotheriita
                                  - Parabrontops gobiensis
                                  - Eubrontotherium clarnoensis
                                  - Parvicornus occidentalis
                                  - - Protitanops curryi
                                    - - Dianotitan lunanensis
                                      - - Duchesneodus uintensis
                                        - - Megacerops coloradensis
                                          - Megacerops kuwagatarhinus
                                - Protitanotherium emarginatum
                                - Pachytitan ajax
                                - - Diplacodon elatus
                                  - Diplacodon gigan
                                - Embolotheriita
                                  - - Aktautitan hippopotamopus
                                    - - Pollyosbornia altidens
                                      - Gnathotitan berkeyi
                                  - - Pygmaetitan panxianensis
                                    - - Brachydiastematherium transylvanicum
                                      - Metatitan khaitshinus
                                      - - Metatitan primus
                                        - Metatitan relictus
                                    - - Nasamplus progressus
                                      - - Protembolotherium efremovi
                                        - - Embolotherium andrewsi
                                          - Embolotherium grangeri
                  ⊟

== Paleoecology ==
Acrotitan lived during the Irdinmanhan land mammal age. The paleoenvironment of the Ulan Shireh Formation is believed to have consisted of warm, forest-dominated habitats. Nearly half of the known mammal species from the Ulan Shireh Formation are perissodactyls. Acrotitan shared its environment with several other brontotheres, including its close relative Desmatotitan, as well as Epimanteoceras, Microtitan, and Protitan. Other perissodactyls included both tapiroids (Breviodon, Lophialetes, Simplaletes, Teleolophus, and Zhongjianoletes) and rhinocerotoids (Forstercooperia, Triplopus, and Lushiamynodon). Artiodactyls were represented by the choeropotamid Gobihyus, and smaller mammals included rodents, lagomorphs, and didymoconids.
