= Epimanteoceras =

Epimanteoceras Temporal range: Middle Eocene (Irdinmanhan), 47.8–42.7 Ma
- Type skull of E. formosus (AMNH 21613)

Scientific classification
- Kingdom: Animalia
- Phylum: Chordata
- Class: Mammalia
- Order: Perissodactyla
- Family: †Brontotheriidae
- Subfamily: †Brontotheriinae
- Tribe: †Brontotheriini
- Genus: †Epimanteoceras; Granger & Gregory, 1943

Type species
- †Epimanteoceras formosus Granger & Gregory, 1943

Other species
- †E. mae Li, 2018; Species pending reassessment: †E. amplus Yanovskaya, 1976; †E. praecursor Yanovskaya, 1953

Synonyms
- Genus synonymy: Dolichorhinoides Granger & Gregory, 1943; Synonyms of E. formosus: Dolichorhinoides angustidens Granger & Gregory, 1943; Protitan cingulatus? Granger & Gregory, 1943

Extinct genus of mammals

Epimanteoceras (lit. 'after prophetic horn', in reference to Manteoceras (Note: The genus Manteoceras is now considered a synonym of Telmatherium.)) is an extinct genus of brontothere that lived in East Asia during the Middle Eocene, in the Irdinmanhan land mammal age. The type species, E. formosus, is known from the Ulan Shireh Formation of Inner Mongolia, China. A second species, E. mae, is known from the Üqbulak Formation in Xinjiang, China. Additional species have historically been assigned to the Epimanteoceras, but their placement in the genus has since been doubted.

Epimanteoceras was a large brontothere; both E. formosus and E. mae surpassed a tonne in weight. Some specimens of Epimanteoceras preserve weakly developed frontonasal protuberances, a feature known only from this genus. All other brontotheres either lack frontonasal protuberances entirely, or have more strongly developed and conspicuous ones (i.e. horns). Epimanteoceras is generally considered to be the sister taxon of the subtribe Brontotheriina, which contains all horned brontotheres.

== Research history ==
=== E. formosus ===
Top and bottom view of AMNH 21613

Epimanteoceras formosus was described by Walter W. Granger and William King Gregory in 1943, based on a well-preserved skull (AMNH 21613), one of the best-preserved brontothere skulls known at the time, found in the Ulan Shireh Formation of Inner Mongolia, China. Granger and Gregory distinguished Epimanteoceras mainly by the state of its frontonasal "horns", "more advanced than in Manteoceras but less so than in Protitan and Protitanotherium". The name Epimanteoceras alludes to the more advanced state when compared to Manteoceras; the Greek prefix epi- can be translated as "after", "over", "outer", or "upon".

Manteoceras has since been synonymized with the genus Telmatherium. Historical treatments often treated Telmatherium as a primitive ancestor of horned brontotheres, because its frontal bones form short triangular extensions above and behind its orbits (eye sockets). Reconstructions sometimes exaggerated these extensions, sometimes restoring them as horns, though no horn-like structures are actually known to have been present in Telmatherium. In Epimanteoceras, Granger and Gregory were correct that some specimens show weakly developed frontonasal protuberances, though those of Epimanteoceras are no longer considered strongly enough developed to be referred to as "horns". In addition to the protuberances, Granger and Gregory also distinguished Epimanteoceras by its unusually wide and progressive upper premolars.

==== Synonyms ====
AMNH 21607, type skull of "Dolichorhinoides angustidens"

Granger and Gregory also named the new genus and species Dolichorhinoides angustidens in 1943, based on the skull AMNH 21607, also found in the Ulan Shireh Formation. AMNH 21607 appears highly elongated, though this is due to lateral crushing of the fossil. Granger and Gregory distinguished D. angustidens from E. formosus only by its "extraordinarily narrow" and elongated upper molars. The choice of the name Dolichorhinoides is curious, since Granger and Gregory also noted that the type skull of D. angustidens "differs conspicuously from [skulls] of the American Dolichorhinus". In 1998, Bryn J. Mader designated both Dolichorhinus and Dolichorhinoides as junior synonyms of the genus Sphenocoelus. In 2008, Matthew C. Mihlbachler demonstrated that Sphenocoelus and Dolichorhinus were distinct genera, and that the type skull of D. angustidens was different from both. New examinations of the type specimens of E. formosus and D. angustidens allowed Mihlbachler to conclude that they did not vary in any taxonomically significant features, and "almost certainly represent the same species". The only feature used by Granger and Gregory to distinguish Epimanteoceras and Dolichorhinoides, the more elongated molars, was attributed by Mihlbachler to dental wear in AMNH 21613 and, to a lesser extent, taphonomic distortion in AMNH 21607.

Protitan cingulatus, another species named by Granger and Gregory in 1943, was considered another possible synonym of E. formosus by Mihlbachler in 2008. P. cingulatus was based on a lower jaw (AMNH 26412) from Inner Mongolia, with its locality data recorded only as "Houldjin?", and features a distinct set of dental characteristics that makes its referral to Protitan likely to be incorrect. According to Mihlbachler, the jaw instead preserves the characteristics that would be expected in a lower jaw of E. formosus, such as a roughly equivalent degree of molarization in the premolars, similar large subcaninform incisors, a similar postcanine diastema (gap between the incisors and canines), and is similar in size to AMNH 21613. Because of the lack overlapping fossil material, no comparison is possible with the E. formosus type fossils, and Mihlbachler designated P. cingulatus as a nomen dubium.

=== Other species ===
Illustration of PIN 3109-41, the partially preserved type skull of "Epimanteoceras amplus"

In 1953, Nataliia Mikhailovna Yanovskaya named the new species E. praecursor, based on a fragment of a right maxilla (SSR 3367a/ 51G) found north of Agadyr in Kazakhstan, in deposits of the Kusto or Akysir formations. The same specimen has in some later publications been incorrectly labelled as KAN-Z-369/MP-61. In 2008, Mihlbachler identified the type maxilla of E. amplus as non-diagnostic, though certainly from a more derived brontothere than E. formosus and thus not belonging to the genus Epimanteoceras. Mihlbachler proposed that the fossil could belong to any number of derived Asian brontotheres and thus designated E. amplus as a nomen dubium.

Yanovskaya named another species of Epimanteoceras in 1976, E. amplus, based on a crushed skull missing the frontonasal region (PIN 3109-41), and an associated partial mandible, found in the Ergilin Dzo Formation in Mongolia. In 1980, Yanovskaya designated E. amplus as a synonym of Protitan robustus, which she reclassified as a species of Epimanteoceras (E. robustus). In 2008, Mihlbachler concluded that E. amplus differs significantly from the fossils assigned to both Epimanteoceras and Protitan by Granger and Gregory, and thus that it neither belonged to Epimanteoceras nor was a synonym of P. (or E.) robustus. Several features of the skull, such as the posterior position of the external nares, the widely separated parasagittal ridges (ridges running lengthwise along the skull), the narrow basicranium, and the short posterior narial canal, indicate that E. amplus is a significantly more derived brontothere, close to Embolotherium and Protembolotherium. Mihlbachler proposed that E. amplus could be a synonym of Nasamplus progressus, a large brontothere closely related to Embolotherium and Protembolotherium, known from contemporary deposits but only from a skull fragment including the frontal, nasal, and parts of the maxilla. Because the fossils overlap very little, and Nasamplus is diagnosed by features in the frontal and nasal, little comparison was possible, and Mihlbachler designated E. amplus as a nomen dubium.

Protitan robustus was described by Granger and Gregory in 1943, based on a lower jaw (AMNH 20104) found in the Irdin Manha Formation of Inner Mongolia, China. P. robustus was identified as a species of Epimanteoceras by Yanovskaya in 1980. In 2008, Mihlbachler found this to be erroneous and instead designated P. robustus as a junior synonym of Protitan grangeri. In 2022, Takehisa Tsubamoto, Khishigjav Tsogtbaatar, Tsogtbaatar Chinzorig, and Naoko Egi instead proposed that Protitan robustus could be a synonym of Nasamplus progressus.

In 2018, Li Shuo named a new species of Epimanteoceras, E. mae, based on an incomplete skull (IVPP V.20713) found at Sangequan in the upper part of the Üqbulak Formation in the Junggar Basin in Xinjiang, China. The skull could be assigned to Epimanteoceras through various characteristics shared with E. formosus, and was distinguished as a new species by several features, such as more constricting parasagittal ridges, a stronger backwards tilt of the occipital, and more distinct occipital pillars with two prominent processes on their upper parts. The new species was named after the discoverer of the skull, Ms. Ma Mei.

== Description ==
Epimanteoceras was a large brontothere, similar in size to Protitan and Protitanotherium. In 2023, Oscar Sanisidro, Mihlbachler, and Juan L. Cantalapiedra estimated E. formosus to have weighed 1,138.1 kilograms (2,509 lb) and E. mae to have weighed 1,063.2 kilograms (2,344 lb).

=== Skull ===
Top and bottom view of AMNH 21607. The apparent elongation and narrowness of the specimen is due to lateral crushing.

The skull of Epimanteoceras was intermediate in morphology between Telmatherium and Protitan. The dorsal (upper) surface of the skull of Epimanteoceras was convex, but not completely saddle-shaped. The zygomatic arches were distinctly curved and relatively thin. The zygomatic arches of E. mae were more strongly arched than those of E. formosus. The nasal process of Epimanteoceras was nearly straight, based on its configuration in AMNH 21613. In AMNH 21607, the nasal process curves slightly downwards, but this may be due to taphonomic distortion. The nasal process broadened towards the front. The premaxillomaxillary rostrum (the part of the jaw extending below the nasal incision) of Epimanteoceras was about as long as the nasal process and deepened posteriorly.

In AMNH 21613, the frontal processes formed small but distinct protuberances above and directly in front of the orbits. This is similar to some fossils of Telmatherium, in which the frontal processes form triangular extensions (but not distinct protuberances) but the protuberances in AMNH 21613 are less developed than in Protitan. The weakly developed protuberances are unique to Epimanteoceras; all other brontothere genera either preserve no protuberances, or they preserve stronger and conspicuous protuberances (i.e. horns). In AMNH 21607, the frontal processes do not form distinct protuberances, and the triangular extensions are instead smooth and nearly flush with the skull surface, similar to the condition in Telmatherium. AMNH 21607 might represent a younger specimen, and the difference may thus be explainable via ontogeny.

The nasal incision of Epimanteoceras extended back to the second premolar. The orbits were positioned above the posterior (backward) part of the second molar, and the anterior (forward) part of the third molar. The sides of the skull had parasagittal ridges, more widely separated han those of Telmatherium. The occipital region is poorly preserved in E. formosus, but appears to have been strongly backwards tilted. The nuchal crest (the posterior edge of the skull) appears to have been slightly concave. These portions of the skull are also poorly known in E. mae, where the occipital region appears to have been even more strongly tilted.

=== Dentition ===
Epimanteoceras had the upper dental formula 3.1.4.3. The upper incisors had a subcaniniform shape, with short and pointed, lingually (towards the tongue) curved tooth crowns. The incisors were progressively larger from the first to third pair, and formed an arch in front of the canines. The canines are imperfectly preserved in the known fossils, but appear to have been relatively large. The first and second pairs of premolars had distinct metacones, and there were weak premolar preprotocristae. The premolars mostly had small hypocones, connected to the protocones, though they were sometimes absent. The molars of Epimanteoceras had tall and lingually angled ectolophs, with weak labial ribs. The lingual ectoloph enamel was thinned, with wedge-shaped metacones and paracones.

== Classification ==
In 1943, Granger and Gregory classified Epimanteoceras in the new brontothere subfamily "Epimanteoceratinae", alongside a large number of other genera, including Protitan, Dolichorhinoides, Microtitan, Rhinotitan, Gnathotitan, Parabrontops, Pachytitan, and Metatitan. In 1997, Malcolm McKenna and Susan K. Bell did not retain "Epimanteoceratinae", and instead placed Epimanteoceras and most other "epimanteoceratines" in the subfamily "Brontopinae". Mihlbachler established a new internal taxonomy of brontotheres in 2008, and recovered Epimanteoceras as part of the tribe Brontotheriini, as a close relative of the subtribes Telmatheriina and Brontotheriina. Mihlbachler noted that analysis of the unordered data made the phylogenetic position of Epimanteoceras somewhat uncertain, and that the genus may nest within Brontotheriina, or be a sister taxon to the subtribe. Mihlbachler's strict reduced consensus tree recovered Epimanteoceras formosus as the sister taxon of Brontotheriina.

In 2018, Li recovered a polytomy with E. formosus, E. mae, and Brontotheriina; E. mae was thus recovered as a close relative of E. formosus, but the two did not form a monophyletic clade. Li nevertheless retained E. mae as Epimanteoceras, noting that morphological features supported its placement in the genus, that important features could not be coded due to the missing frontal portions of the E. mae skull, and that some features uniting E. mae and E. formosus were not part of the character matrix used (the same matrix used by Mihlbachler in 2008), such as a large superorbital process. In a 2021 phylogenetic analysis, Mihlbachler and Donald Prothero again recovered E. formosus as the sister taxon of Brontotheriina, but E. mae in a slightly more derived position, inside Brontotheriina.

Topology A: Li (2018)

- Brontotheriidae
  - - Eotitanops
    - - cf. Eotitanops
      - - Palaeosyops
        - Brontotheriinae
          - Bunobrontops savagei
          - - Mesatirhinus junius
            - - Dolichorhinus hyognathus
              - - Desmatotitan tukhumensis
                - Acrotitan ulanshirehensis
              - - Sphenocoelus uintensis
                - Brontotheriini
                  - - Microtitan mongoliensis
                    - Rhadinorhinina
                      ⊞
                      - Fossendorhinus diploconus
                      - - Metarhinus fluviatilis
                        - Metarhinus abbotti
                      ⊟
                  - - Sthenodectes incisivum
                    - - Telmatheriina
                        ⊞
                        - Telmatherium validus
                        - - Qufutitan zhoui
                          - - Wickia brevirhinus
                            - Metatelmatherium ultimum
                        ⊟
                      - - Epimanteoceras formosus
                        - Epimanteoceras mae
                        - - Brontotheriina
                            - Protitan grangeri
                            - Protitan minor
                            - - Protitanotherium emarginatum
                              - - - Rhinotitan kaiseni
                                  - Rhinotitan andrewsi
                                - - Pachytitan ajax
                                  - Diplacodon elatus
                                  - Brontotheriita
                                    ⊞
                                    - Parabrontops gobiensis
                                    - Protitanops curryi
                                    - - Eubrontotherium clarnoensis
                                      - - Dianotitan lunanensis
                                        - Duchesneodus uintensis
                                        - - Megacerops coloradensis
                                          - Megacerops kuwagatarhinus
                                    ⊟
                                - Embolotheriita
                                  ⊞
                                  - - Aktautitan hippopotamopus
                                    - - Pollyosbornia altidens
                                      - Gnathotitan berkeyi
                                  - - Pygmaetitan panxianensis
                                    - - Brachydiastematherium transylvanicum
                                      - Metatitan khaitshinus
                                      - - Metatitan primus
                                        - Metatitan relictus
                                    - - Nasamplus progressus
                                      - - Protembolotherium efremovi
                                        - - Embolotherium andrewsi
                                          - Embolotherium grangeri
                                  ⊟

Topology B: Mihlbachler & Prothero (2021)

- Brontotheriidae
  - - Eotitanops
    - "cf. Eotitanops" (Eberle, 2006)
    - Eotitanops pakistanensis
    - - Palaeosyops
      - Brontotheriinae
        - Bunobrontops savagei
        - - Balochititanops haqi
          - - Mesatirhinus junius
            - - Dolichorhinus hyognathus
              - - Desmatotitan tukhumensis
                - Acrotitan ulanshirehensis
              - - Sphenocoelus uintensis
                - Brontotheriini
                  - - Microtitan mongoliensis
                    - Rhadinorhinina
                      ⊞
                      - Fossendorhinus diploconus
                      - - Metarhinus pater
                        - Metarhinus fluviatilis
                        - Metarhinus abbotti
                      ⊟
                  - - Sthenodectes incisivum
                    - - Telmatherium validus
                      - Qufutitan zhoui
                      - - Wickia brevirhinus
                        - Xylotitan cenosus
                        - Metatelmatherium ultimum
                      - - Epimanteoceras formosus
                        - - Brontotheriina
                            - Epimanteoceras mae
                            - - Protitan grangeri
                              - Protitan minor
                            - - Rhinotitan kaiseni
                              - - Rhinotitan andrewsi
                                - Brontotheriita
                                  ⊞
                                  - Parabrontops gobiensis
                                  - Eubrontotherium clarnoensis
                                  - Parvicornus occidentalis
                                  - - Protitanops curryi
                                    - - Dianotitan lunanensis
                                      - - Duchesneodus uintensis
                                        - - Megacerops coloradensis
                                          - Megacerops kuwagatarhinus
                                  ⊟
                                - Protitanotherium emarginatum
                                - Pachytitan ajax
                                - - Diplacodon elatus
                                  - Diplacodon gigan
                                - Embolotheriita
                                  ⊞
                                  - - Aktautitan hippopotamopus
                                    - - Pollyosbornia altidens
                                      - Gnathotitan berkeyi
                                  - - Pygmaetitan panxianensis
                                    - - Brachydiastematherium transylvanicum
                                      - Metatitan khaitshinus
                                      - - Metatitan primus
                                        - Metatitan relictus
                                    - - Nasamplus progressus
                                      - - Protembolotherium efremovi
                                        - - Embolotherium andrewsi
                                          - Embolotherium grangeri
                                  ⊟

== Paleoecology ==
Epimanteoceras lived during the Irdinmanhan land mammal age. The paleoenvironment of the Ulan Shireh Formation is believed to have consisted of warm, forest-dominated habitats. Nearly half of the known mammal species from the Ulan Shireh Formation are perissodactyls. E. formosus shared its environment with several other brontotheres, including Acrotitan, Desmatotitan, Microtitan, and Protitan. Other perissodactyls included both tapiroids (Breviodon, Lophialetes, Simplaletes, Teleolophus, and Zhongjianoletes) and rhinocerotoids (Forstercooperia, Triplopus, and Lushiamynodon). Artiodactyls were represented by the choeropotamid Gobihyus, and smaller mammals included rodents, lagomorphs, and didymoconids.

E. mae is from the upper Üqbulak Formation, or "bone bed C", which is much less fossiliferous than the lower "bone bed B". Other fossils found at this level include scarce remains of Rhodopagus are also known from "bone bed C".
