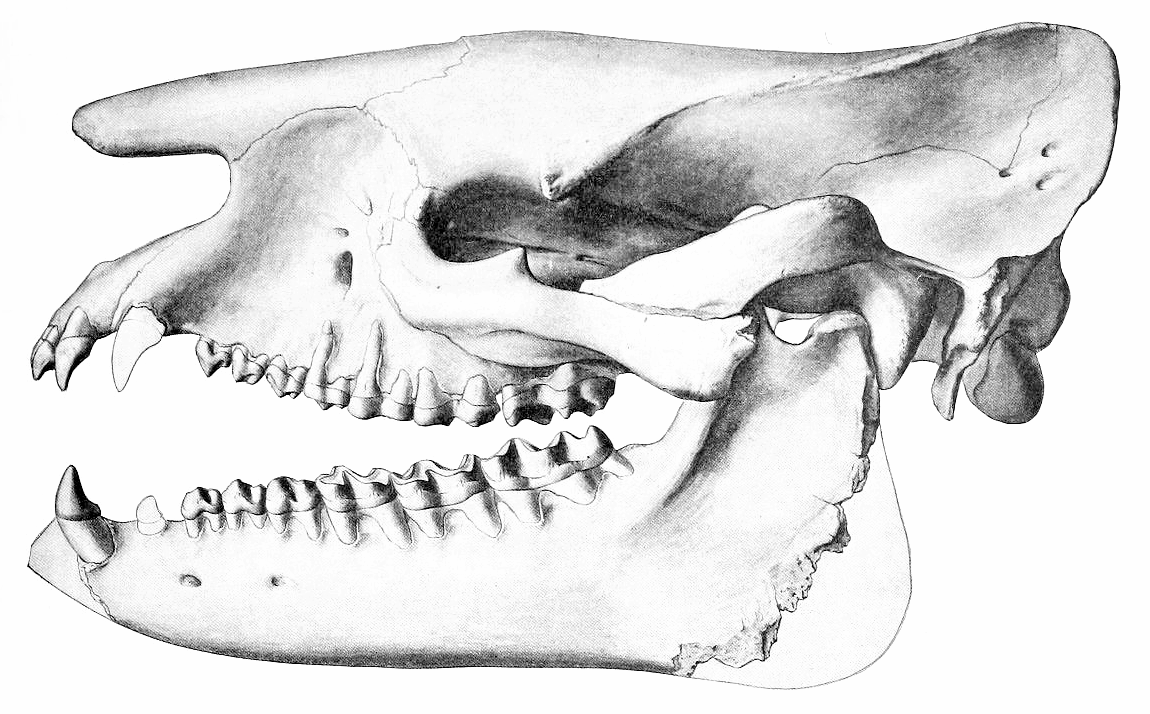
- Skull of Metatelmatherium

Scientific classification
- Kingdom: Animalia
- Phylum: Chordata
- Class: Mammalia
- Order: Perissodactyla
- Family: †Brontotheriidae
- Subfamily: †Brontotheriinae
- Tribe: †Brontotheriini
- Subtribe: †Telmatheriina; Osborn, 1914

Genera
- †Hyotitan?; †Metatelmatherium; †Qufutitan; †Telmatherium; †Wickia; †Xylotitan

= Telmatheriina =

Telmatheres Temporal range: Middle Eocene, 47.8–39.9 Ma (Note: The fossil range follows North American land mammal age correlations (with precise dates) from Hodnett et al. (2022) and Asian land mammal age correlations from Mihlbachler (2008) and Bai et al. (2020).)

Extinct subtribe of mammals

Telmatheres (subtribe Telmatheriina) were a group of derived (advanced) brontotheres. Telmatheres were medium-sized to large brontotheres, found in Middle Eocene deposits in North America and East Asia. Telmatheres were close relatives of the horned brontotheres, and include the largest known brontotheres without horns. It is unclear if the telmatheres form a monophyletic group (i.e. a clade), since the positions of some genera vary between phylogenetic analyses.

== Description ==
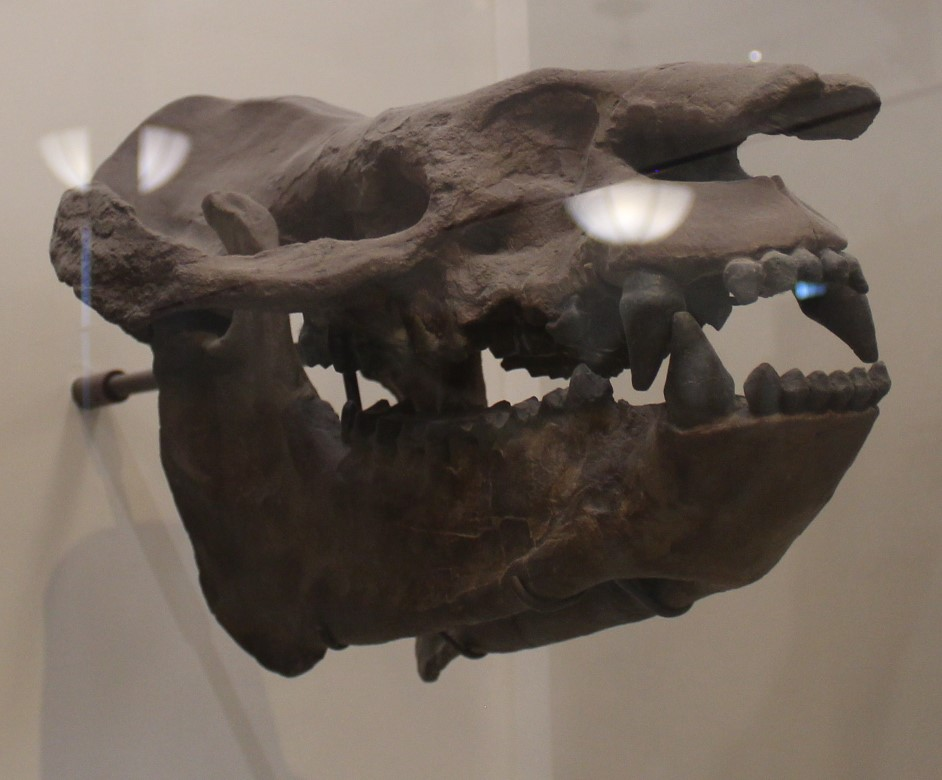
Skull of Telmatherium

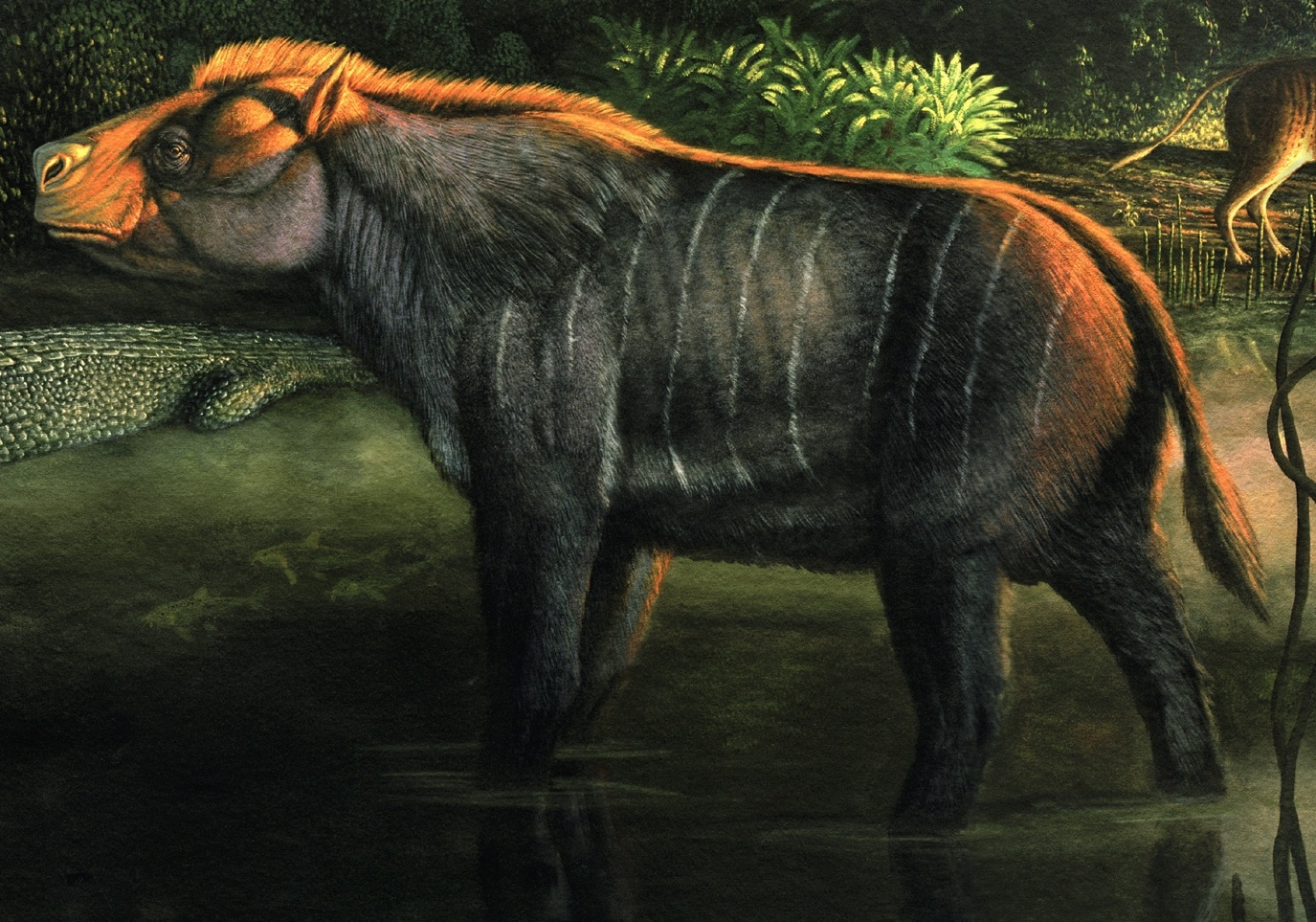
Life restoration of Telmatherium

Telmatheres are known only from cranial fossils (skulls, jaws, and teeth). They were medium-sized to large brontotheres that share a single securely identified apomorphy (shared evolved trait): the loss of central molar fossae (central depressions in the molar teeth). The largest known telmathere, Qufutitan, is the largest known hornless brontothere overall.

== Classification ==
=== History, systematics, and phylogenetics ===
Telmatherium validus was the first telmathere to be described, by Othniel Charles Marsh in 1872. Misinterpretations of Telmatherium fossils have historically complicated telmathere classification. Telmatherium had short triangular "extensions" above and behind its eye sockets; historical reconstructions often erroneously exaggerate these extensions, sometimes incorrectly restoring them as horns. There is no actual evidence of horns in Telmatherium, and similar "extensions" are seen in other genera. Despite this, Telmatherium has historically been interpreted as an ancestor of the horned brontotheres, which is not necessarily supported by modern phylogenetic analyses.

In 1914, Henry Fairfield Osborn named the brontothere subfamilies "Telmatheriinae" (to encompass Telmatherium and the more basal Sthenodectes) and "Manteoceratinae" (the now invalid genus Manteoceras and the horned Protitanotherium). Much of the formerly recognized "Manteoceras" fossil material is now considered to belong to Telmatherium. The "Telmatheriinae" of Osborn encompassed fossils now recognized as Telmatherium and Metatelmatherium. In 1943, Walter W. Granger and William King Gregory named the subfamily "Metatelmatheriinae" to include Metatelmatherium, Hyotitan, and Desmatotitan, and noted that Metatelmatherium is certainly closely related to Telmatherium. Granger's and Gregory's "Metatelmatheriinae" has since been deemed equivalent to Osborn's "Telmatheriinae". In 1989, Bryn J. Mader altered "Telmatheriinae" to encompass Telmatherium and the horned brontotheres of North America, a grouping Mader later referred to as "Brontotheriinae". Phylogenetic analyses by Matthew C. Mihlbachler determined that Mader's brontothere groupings did not form natural groups.

In a phylogenetic analysis performed for a major 2008 brontothere monograph, Mihlbachler recovered a clade similar to Osborn's "Telmatheriinae". Mihlbachler referred to this clade as Telmatheriina, having reranked "Telmatheriinae" to the status of a subtribe to fit with his larger-scale systematic revision of the brontotheres. The Telmatheriina are classified in the tribe Brontotheriini, in the subfamily Brontotheriinae (using a different definition than Mader). Mihlbachler's Telmatheriina encompassed the four genera Metatelmatherium, Qufutitan, Telmatherium, and Wickia, though Qufutitan was sometimes recovered outside the clade. In 2016, Mihlbachler and Donald Prothero described the new genus Xylotitan. In a phylogenetic analysis, Mihlbachler and Prothero recovered Xylotitan in a clade with Wickia and Metatelmatherium. Telmatherium and Qufutitan were recovered as more basal, meaning that Telmatheriina as defined by Mihlbachler in 2008 was found to be polyphyletic. Mihlbachler and Prothero noted that the position of the Xylotitan + Metatelmatherium + Wickia clade was "uncertain with respect to several other North American and Asian brontotheres of middle Eocene age".

The cladograms below show brontothere classification per the primary strict reduced consensus tree from Mihlbachler's 2008 analysis, and the reduced strict consensus tree from the 2021 analysis by Mihlbachler and Prothero:

Topology A: Mihlbachler (2008)

- Brontotheriidae
  - - Eotitanops
    - - cf. Eotitanops
      - - Palaeosyops
        - Brontotheriinae
          - Bunobrontops savagei
          - - Mesatirhinus junius
            - - Dolichorhinus hyognathus
              - - Desmatotitan tukhumensis
                - Acrotitan ulanshirehensis
              - - Sphenocoelus uintensis
                - Brontotheriini
                  - - Microtitan mongoliensis
                    - Rhadinorhinina
                      - Fossendorhinus diploconus
                      - - Metarhinus fluviatilis
                        - Metarhinus abbotti
                  - - Sthenodectes incisivum
                    - - Telmatheriina
                        - Telmatherium validus
                        - - Qufutitan zhoui
                          - - Wickia brevirhinus
                            - Metatelmatherium ultimum
                      - - Epimanteoceras formosus
                        - Brontotheriina

Topology B: Mihlbachler & Prothero (2021)

- Brontotheriidae
  - - Eotitanops
    - "cf. Eotitanops" (Eberle, 2006)
    - Eotitanops pakistanensis
    - - Palaeosyops
      - Brontotheriinae
        - Bunobrontops savagei
        - - Balochititanops haqi
          - - Mesatirhinus junius
            - - Dolichorhinus hyognathus
              - - Desmatotitan tukhumensis
                - Acrotitan ulanshirehensis
              - - Sphenocoelus uintensis
                - Brontotheriini
                  - - Microtitan mongoliensis
                    - Rhadinorhinina
                      - Fossendorhinus diploconus
                      - - Metarhinus pater
                        - Metarhinus fluviatilis
                        - Metarhinus abbotti
                  - - Sthenodectes incisivum
                    - - Telmatherium validus
                      - Qufutitan zhoui
                      - - Wickia brevirhinus
                        - Xylotitan cenosus
                        - Metatelmatherium ultimum
                      - - Epimanteoceras formosus
                        - Brontotheriina

=== Etymology ===
The name Telmatheriina is derived from the genus Telmatherium. Telmatherium means "marsh beast" or "pool beast", from the Greek τέλμα (télma, "marsh" or "pool") and θηρίον (theríon, "beast"). Osborn connected this name to the original fossils of the genus having been found in a supposed "ancient lake basin". Members of the Telmatheriina are informally referred to as "telmatheres".

== Evolutionary history and paleobiogeography ==
Telmatheres are known from both North America and Asia, and it is unclear which of the two continents they originated on. Because mammal faunas changed over time, scientists often divide the Cenozoic biochronologically into a series of "land mammal ages" based on faunal composition. Asia and North America have separate but closely correlated land mammal ages, the Asian land mammal ages (ALMA) and the North American land mammal ages (NALMA). The telmatheres may have dispersed from Asia to North America or North America to Asia during the Irdinmanhan ALMA/Uintan NALMA, from when the early representatives of the group are known from both continents.

The earliest known telmatheres are Telmatherium validus from the Wyoming in the United States and Metatelmatherium ultimum from Inner Mongolia in China. Telmatherium is known from the late Bridgerian NALMA (Br3) to the early Uintan NALMA (Ui1), whereas Metatelmatherium is known from the Irdinmanhan ALMA. Metatelmatherium itself migrated to North America in a second dispersal event, since M. ultimum is also known from the late Uintan (Ui3) of Wyoming. Wickia is known from the early to middle Uintan (Ui1–Ui2) of Colorado and Wyoming in the United States. Xylotitan is known from the middle Uintan of Oregon in the United States. The youngest known telmathere is Qufutitan zhoui, which is known from the Sharamurunian ALMA of Shandong, China.
