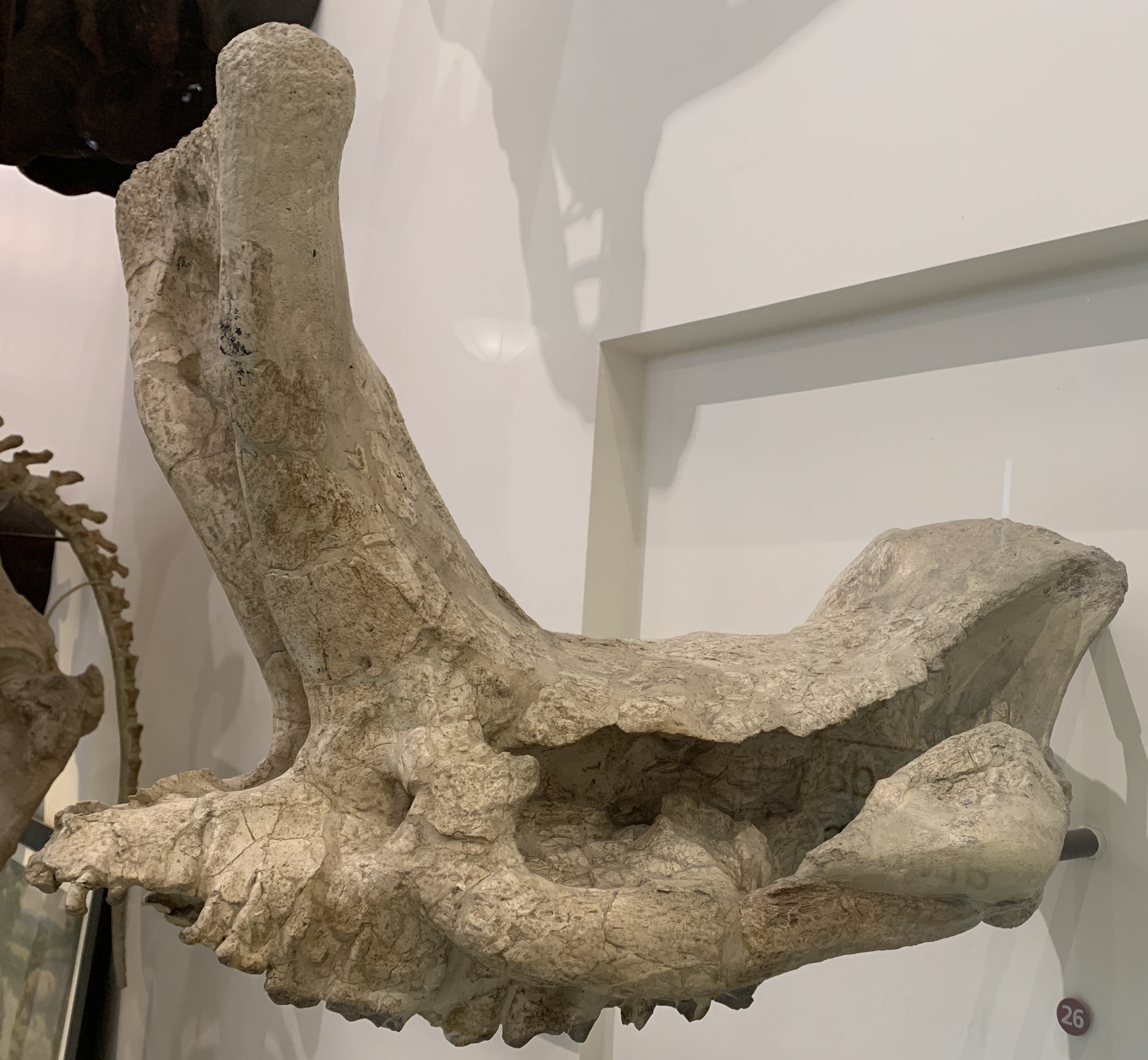
- Skull of E. andrewsi at the American Museum of Natural History

Scientific classification
- Kingdom: Animalia
- Phylum: Chordata
- Class: Mammalia
- Order: Perissodactyla
- Family: †Brontotheriidae
- Subfamily: †Brontotheriinae
- Tribe: †Brontotheriini
- Subtribe: †Brontotheriina
- Infratribe: †Embolotheriita
- Genus: †Embolotherium; Osborn, 1929

Type species
- †Embolotherium andrewsi Osborn, 1929

Other species
- †E. grangeri Osborn, 1929

Synonyms
- Genus synonymy: Titanodectes? Granger & Gregory, 1943; Synonyms of E. andrewsi: E. ultimum Granger & Gregory, 1943; E. ergilense Dashzeveg, 1975; Synonyms of E. grangeri: Titanodectes ingens? Granger & Gregory, 1943; Titanodectes minor? Granger & Gregory, 1943; E. loucksii Osborn, 1929; E. insigne Yanovskaya, 1980

= Embolotherium =

Embolotherium Temporal range: Late Eocene (Ulangochuian–Ergilian), 39.9–33.9 Ma Possible Sharamurunian record (Note: Mihlbachler (2008) also placed Embolotherium in the Sharamurunian land mammal age, which precedes the Ulangochuian, but this is based on fossils assigned to the genus Titanodectes (which Mihlbachler considered a synonym).)

Extinct genus of mammals

Embolotherium (lit. 'battering ram beast') is an extinct genus of horned brontothere that lived in East Asia during the Late Eocene, in the Ulangochuian and Ergilian land mammal ages. Fossils of Embolotherium have mainly been found in Inner Mongolia in China, and in Mongolia, particularly in the Ulan Gochu and Ergilin Dzo formations.

Embolotherium is distinguished from other brontotheres by its "ram", a highly unique and elongated structure at the front of the skull. The ram developed from the horns, frontal bones, and nasal bones of Embolotherium's ancestors. In the past, the ram was interpreted as functioning like a horn and to have been used for combat. The skeletal features of the ram, such as the nasal septum running along the entire length of the structure, instead indicate that the ram was incorporated into a large soft-tissue snout, and served to support a large nasal cavity. The orientation and position of the ram is among the features that serve to distinguish the two currently recognized species of Embolotherium. In E. andrewsi, the ram is relatively vertical and rises above the orbits (eye sockets), whereas in E. grangeri the ram is curved forwards and rises behind the orbits.

Embolotherium was a massive and robust animal. Although known mainly from skulls and jaws, the limited postcranial fossils and comparisons to other brontotheres indicate that Embolotherium was one of the largest representatives of the group, and similar in size to the better known North American Megacerops. Embolotherium is estimated to have stood about 2.5 meters (8 ft 2 in) tall at the shoulder, and to have reached a body mass in excess of three tonnes. Embolotherium lived in a subtropical and humid environment that was undergoing aridification and gradually changing from dense forest to open steppe, though it had in Embolotherium's time not yet transitioned into forest steppe.

== Research history ==
=== Discovery and initial descriptions ===
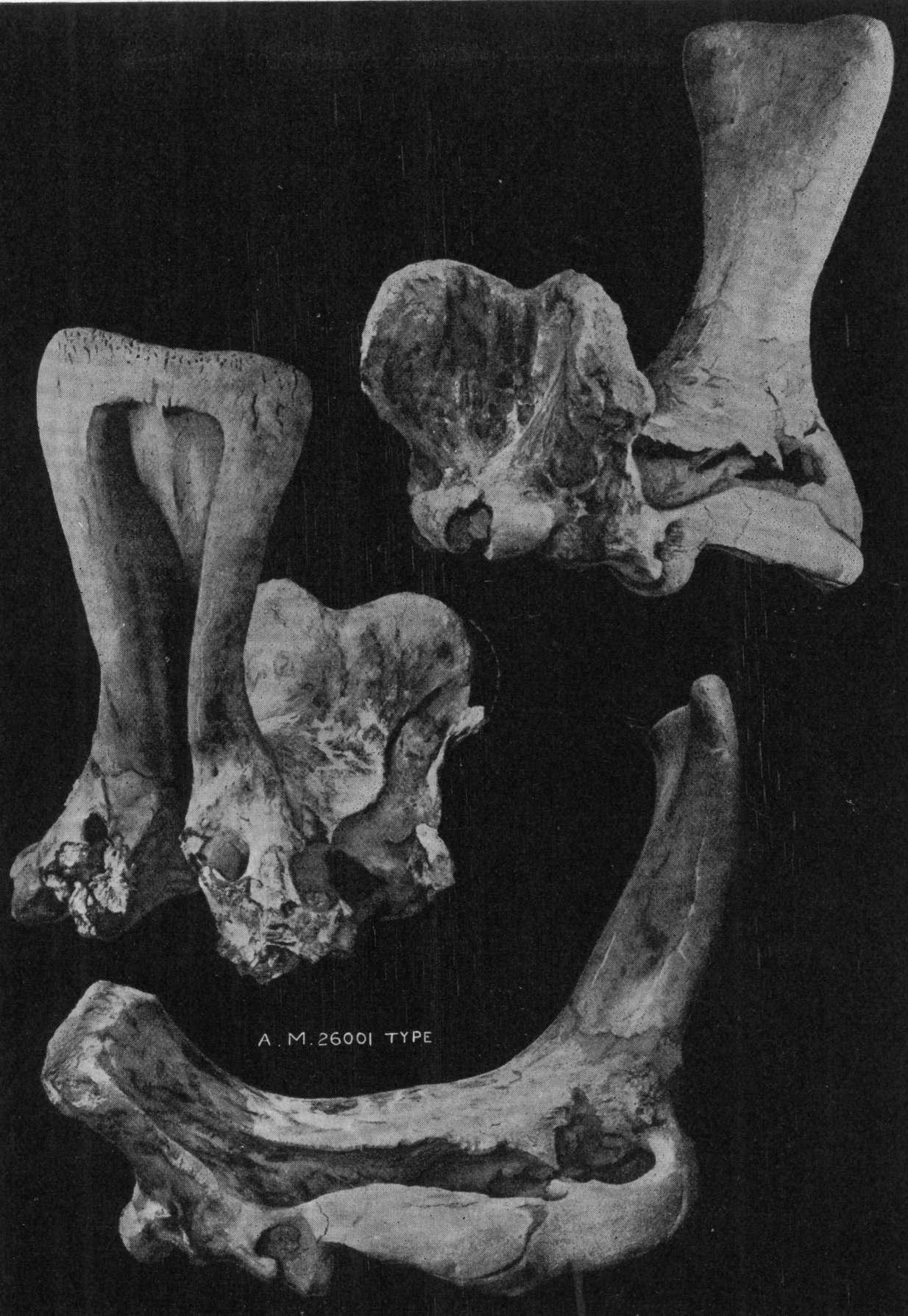
Type skull of E. andrewsi (AMNH 26001)

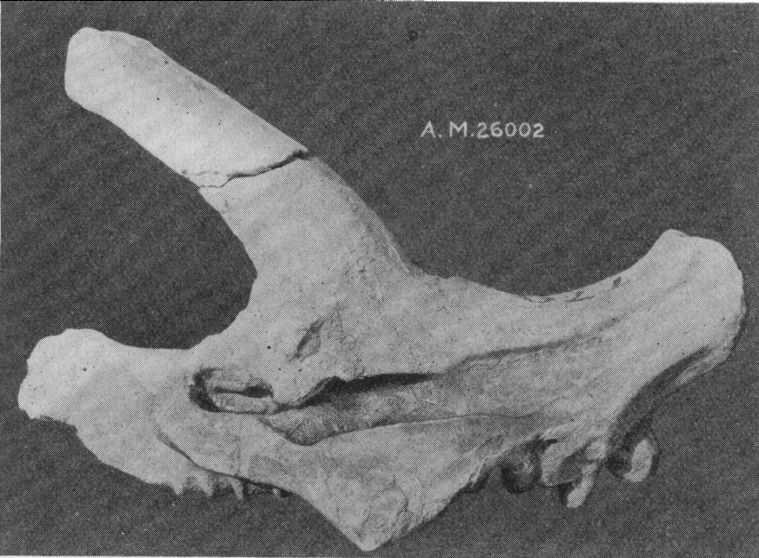
Type skull of E. grangeri (AMNH 26002)

Embolotherium fossils were first discovered in 1925 in the Ulan Gochu Formation of Inner Mongolia, China by an expedition from the American Museum of Natural History, led by Walter W. Granger. Additional and better-preserved fossils were found in 1928 on the museum's Fifth Central Asiatic Expedition, led by Granger and Roy Chapman Andrews. Cranial elements from at least fourteen Embolotherium individuals were recovered by the expeditions, including several nearly complete skulls. In 1929, Henry Fairfield Osborn described the new genus Embolotherium based on these skulls. The generic name Embolotherium references the unique bony protuberance on the front of the animal's skull, and was derived from the Greek word 'έμβολή (sic)' (embolḗ), glossed by Osborn as "battering ram", and the common prehistoric mammal suffix -therium (from the Greek θηρίον, theríon, meaning "beast"). Osborn easily distinguished Embolotherium from the other brontotheres known at the time by its unique protuberance, which Osborn referred to as the "ram" and described as a "completely novel form".

Osborn named three species of Embolotherium based on the skulls. The type species E. andrewsi was based on the skull AMNH 26001 and named after Andrews, E. grangeri on the skull AMNH 26002 and named after Granger, and E. loucksii on the skull AMNH 26010 and named after Harold Loucks, who had discovered this skull. The main feature distinguishing the three species was the shape and position of the ram. In E. andrewsi, the ram rises up directly above the orbits (eye sockets) and curves slightly backwards, and in E. grangeri the ram rises from the middle portion of the skull, slightly behind the orbits, and curves forwards and downwards. E. loucksii was distinguished by the ram rising forward and upwards, without curving. Both E. grangeri and E. loucksii were noted to have an elongated premaxillary rostrum (the part of the jaw extending below the nasal incision), which Osborn did not observe in E. andrewsi.

In 1943, Granger and William King Gregory revised the brontotheres known from Mongolia and Inner Mongolia. Granger and Gregory amended the diagnoses of the genus Embolotherium and the diagnoses of the species described by Osborn, changed the species designation of some of the fossils, and referred several new fossils to E. andrewsi, including skulls and lower jaws, all from the Ulan Gochu Formation. Granger and Gregory also described the new species E. ultimum, based on the partial skull AMNH 21604, found in the slightly later Baron Sog Formation. Granger and Gregory distinguished their new species from the others mainly by its larger size, the relatively great size of the third molar, and the greatly expanded zygomatic arches. They also described a new genus of large brontothere from Inner Mongolia, Titanodectes, with two species, based on lower jaws. Granger and Gregory noted that the species T. ingens could represent lower jaws of E. grangeri but that actual comparison was impossible since T. ingens and E. grangeri had no known overlapping fossil material.

Osborn had believed that the ram of Embolotherium was a completely unique anatomical structure. Granger and Gregory instead demonstrated that the ram was a highly derived form of the horns seen in other horned brontotheres.

=== Further discoveries ===
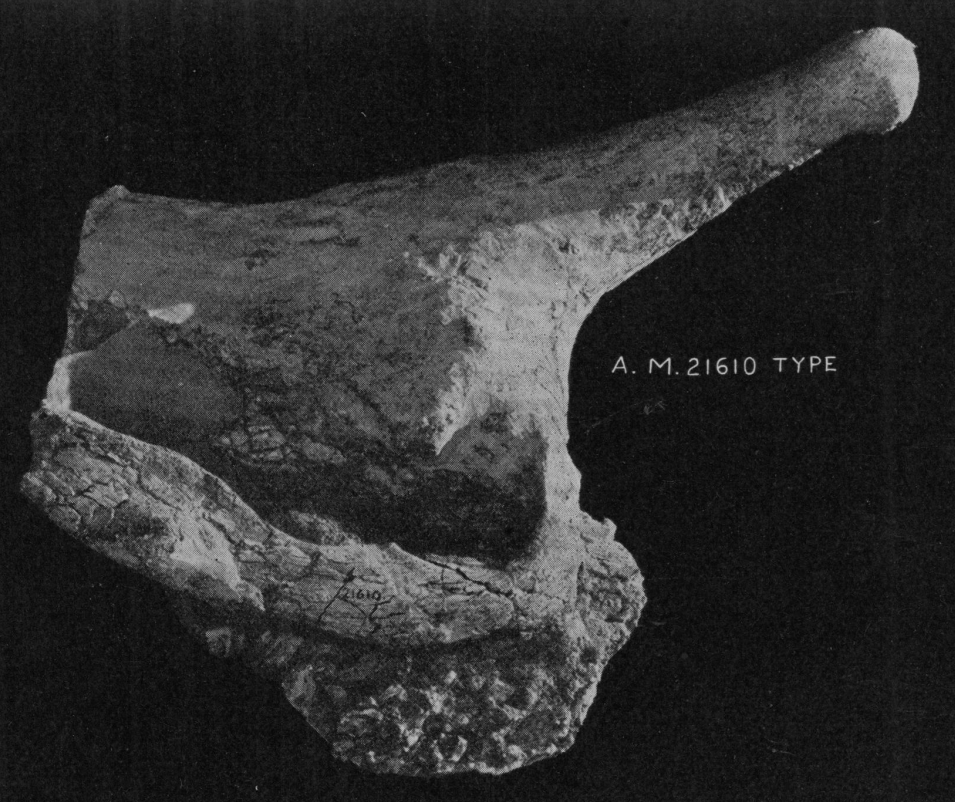
Type skull of E. loucksii (AMNH 26010), now considered a synonym of E. grangeri

Granger and Gregory's 1943 revision remained the standard work on Asian brontotheres for much of the 20th century. Additional paleontological work was carried out on the brontotheres of Mongolia and Inner Mongolia by Soviet and Chinese paleontologists, but these studies were done without new comparisons to the large collection of Asian fossils in American museums. This was problematic, since the American Museum of Natural History still holds the majority of brontothere holotypes from the region. Instead, Soviet and Chinese studies largely followed on from Granger and Gregory's assessments, sometimes faulty, which hindered the understanding of the true diversity and evolution of Asian brontotheres.

Adding to E. andrewsi, E. grangeri, E. loucksii, and E. ultimum, two further species of Embolotherium were described in the latter half of the 20th century. In 1975, Demberelyin Dashzeveg briefly described the new species E. ergilense, based on a skull from the Ergilin Dzo Formation (National Museum of Mongolia, item 10). The E. ergilense skull does not preserve the premaxillae, or most of the maxillary dentition, but appears to be larger and more robust than other Embolotherium fossils. Also in 1975, Qi Tao described a new skull of E. grangeri (IVPP V.3015) from Ningxia, extending the known range of Embolotherium further south.

In 1980, Nataliia Mikhailovna Yanovskaya described the new species E. insigne in the monograph Brontoterii Mongolii ("The Brontotheres of Mongolia"). This species was based on the partial skull PIN 3110-52, from Khoer Dzan in the Ergilin Dzo Formation, and was distinguished by the ram being shorter and appearing more straight than those of the other species, similar to E. loucksii. Yanovskaya was also the first to refer limited postcranial fossils to Embolotherium. In addition to these fossils, the Paleontological Institute, Russian Academy of Sciences (PIN) also holds a large and largely undescribed collection of E. grangeri fossils, including skulls from several individuals of different ontogenetic stages.

=== Revisions ===
Jaw of E. andrewsi (AMNH 26009)

In a major 2008 monograph on brontotheres. Matthew C. Mihlbachler only recognized two valid species of Embolotherium: E. andrewsi and E. grangeri. E. ultimum and E. ergilense were designated as junior synonyms of E. andrewsi. Mihlbachler noted that E. ultimum had been distinguished mainly by its large size, that the supposedly relatively larger third molar had its apparent size exaggerated by several cracks in the tooth, and that the skull otherwise shared several features with E. andrewsi. E. ergilense was likewise determined to be consistent with skulls of E. andrewsi, though larger and more robust than most other fossils. E. loucksii and E. insigne were designated as junior synonyms of E. grangeri, with Mihlbachler noting that both of their type skulls appeared to be from subadult individuals and that the ram curving downwards may have been a ontogenetic feature. Additionally, Mihlbachler pointed out that the ram of AMNH 26010 (type of E. loucksii) was in large part reconstructed with plaster, and that its present appearance was therefore not reliable.

Mihlbachler also designated Titanodectes as a junior synonym of Embolotherium, with both Titanodectes species (T. ingens and T. minor) designated as junior synonyms of E. grangeri. Mihlbachler pointed out several errors in Granger and Gregory's interpretations of the dentition of Embolotherium and Titanodectes, which removed the main distinguishing features between the two genera. Comparing the Titanodectes jaws to those of Embolotherium, including a juvenile jaw of E. grangeri, Mihlbachler proposed that they were merely the lower jaws of adult E. grangeri.

In 2018, Bin Bai and colleagues agreed with Mihlbachler's assessment that only E. andrewsi and E. grangeri were valid species of Embolotherium, but rejected synonymization with Titanodectes, which they treated as a valid genus. Bai and colleagues noted that no reliable lower dentition was known from adult E. grangeri, which makes actual comparison to the Titanodectes fossils impossible, and that Titanodectes and Embolotherium are known from different localities, and different horizons. Later papers by Bai and colleagues in 2020 and 2025 have maintained Titanodectes as a valid genus. In a 2022 review of the fauna of the Ergilin Dzo Formation, Takehisa Tsubamoto, Khisigjav Tsogtbaatar, Tsogtbaatar Chinzorig, and Naoko Egi agreed with Mihlbachler's assessment, and treated only E. andrewsi and E. grangeri as valid, with both species of Titanodectes considered synonyms of E. grangeri.

== Description ==
Life restoration of E. andrewsi. The position of the nostrils at the top of the ram is speculative but plausible (see below).

Embolotherium was a very large brontothere, chiefly distinguished by its unique skull. Based on comparisons with more completely known brontotheres, Embolotherium was likely one of the largest brontotheres, alongside the North American genus Megacerops. Embolotherium is estimated to have reached a size similar to Megacerops, likely standing about 2.5 meters (8 ft 2 in) tall at the shoulder. In 2023, Oscar Sanisidro, Mihlbachler, and Juan L. Cantalapiedra estimated the body mass of E. andrewsi at 2,704 kilograms (5,961 lb) and that of E. grangeri at 3,448 kilograms (7,602 lb).

=== Skull ===
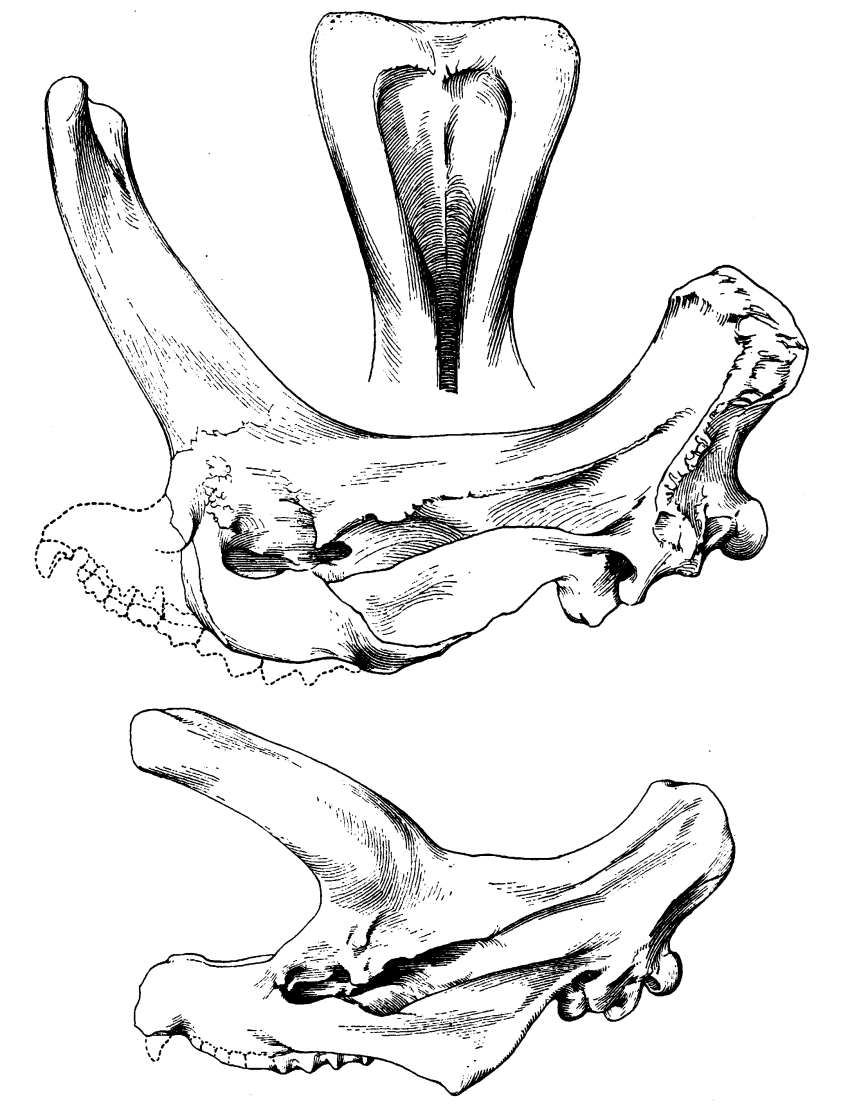
Drawings of the type skulls of E. andrewsi (top) and E. grangeri (bottom)

Embolotherium had a saddle-shaped skull. Due to the different positions of their rams, the skull of E. andrewsi was more deeply saddle-shaped than that of E. grangeri. Both species had robust zygomatic arches, with massive swellings. The zygomatic arches of E. andrewsi were weakly curved, whereas those of E. grangeri were strongly bowed laterally (sideways). Unlike most horned brontotheres (and most perissodactyls overall), Embolotherium completely lacked a horizontal nasal process. Instead, the horns, nasal bones, and frontal bones of Embolotherium's ancestors had developed into the large ram. The ram of E. andrewsi was more vertical than that of E. grangeri, and positioned above the orbits (eye sockets). The ram of E. grangeri was positioned behind the orbits and curved forwards, at about a 45° angle. The premaxillomaxillary rostrum of E. andrewsi was small and short, thickening slightly posteriorly (towards the back). The premaxillomaxillary rostrum of E. grangeri was much larger than that of E. grangeri, and deepened slightly proximally (towards its center and the rest of the skull).

The nasal incision of E. andrewsi extended back to the anterior (forward) margin of the fourth upper premolar, and that of E. grangeri extended much further, back to the anterior margin of the third molar. The orbits of both species were positioned above the second upper molars. Both species also had prominent parasagittal ridges (ridges running lengthwise along the skull), though those of E. andrewsi were more prominent. In neither species did these ridges constrict the skull's upper surface towards the back. The occiput of E. andrewsi was massive, far more massive than in E. grangeri and the closely related Protembolotherium, and rivaling the massiveness of the occiputs of the largest specimens of Megacerops. The nuchal crest (the posterior edge of the skull) of E. andrewsi was thick and rugose, whereas that of E. grangeri was comparatively thin. In both species, the nuchal crest was concave, though that of E. andrewsi was more deeply notched.

=== Dentition ===
Embolotherium had the dental formula 3.1.4.33.1.4.3. Both species had three pairs of upper incisors, positioned in a semicircular row. The incisors of E. grangeri were globular and relatively large, much larger than the very small incisors of E. andrewsi. The canines of E. grangeri were very small, and those of E. andrewsi were irregular and not fully erupted in all adult specimens. This suggests that the canines of Embolotherium, at least E. andrewsi, were vestigial. Some specimens of E. andrewsi had a very short diastema (gap between teeth) between the third pair of incisors and the canines, and between the canines and first premolars. In E. grangeri, the diastema between the canines and first premolars was about the same length as the second premolars. The premolars were roughly rectangular in outline, and the first pair of premolars were much smaller than the later pairs. The molars had tall, lingually (towards the tongue) angled ectolophs (shearing edges) with weak labial ribs. The hypocone (one of the cusps) of the third molar was larger in E. grangeri than in E. andrewsi. The cingulum of the third molar in E. andrewsi was continuous along the distolingual (back, towards the tongue) corner of the tooth crown, whereas it was discontinuous in E. grangeri.

There were three pairs of lower incisors, lined up in an arch in front of the lower canines. Like with the upper incisors, the incisors of E. grangeri were larger than those of E. andrewsi. The lower incisors of E. grangeri had a semispatulate (somewhat spatula-like) shape. The lower canines were not much larger than the lower incisors in size. The tooth crown of the lower canines was blunt. In E. andrewsi, the lower canines were always fully erupted, unlike the irregularity in the upper canines. Very short diastemas separated the last pair of lower incisors, the lower canines, and the lower premolars. In the lower premolars, metaconids were present on the third and fourth pair of premolars, and sometimes on the second pair. The trigonid (shearing part) of the second lower premolar was marginally longer than the tooth's talonid (crushing part). The lower molars all had deep, valley-like basins. The third pair of lower molars were elongated.

=== Postcranial skeleton ===
The poorly known postcranial skeleton of Embolotherium is believed to have resembled that of the North American Megacerops (pictured)

Embolotherium is known almost entirely from skulls and jaws. Historically, Embolotherium has generally been assumed to have had a postcranial skeleton similar to that of the better known Megacerops. Even Osborn, who did not believe the two genera to be closely related, restored Embolotherium based on Brontotherium (a junior synonym of Megacerops) in its original 1929 description.

Limited postcranial fossils of Embolotherium were first described in 1980, by Yanovskaya. A more substantial collection of postcranial fossils was later tentatively referred to the genus in 2010, by Benjamin McLaughlin, Mihlbachler, and Mick Ellison in 2010. McLaughlin, Mihlbachler, and Ellison's fossils were part of a previously unstudied 1920s collection of fossils from Mongolia at the American Museum of Natural History, originally collected in the Shara Murun and Baron Sog formations. The assemblage clearly comes from a very large brontothere, though cannot be securely identified since the fossils are not associated with any skull material. The only brontothere known from the Baron Sog Formation is E. andrewsi, supporting that the fossils may be from this species; the postcranial fossils reported from there include an atlas bone, several ulnae, patellae, a partial femur, and several elements of the manus and pes. These fossils suggest a powerful and graviportal animal, with a postcranial anatomy similar to that of Megacerops.

McLaughlin, Mihlbachler, and Ellison's fossils from the Shara Murun Formation include elements from the forelimb, manus, and pes, and were noted to be from a "morphologically similar brontothere, probably also representing Embolotherium". Embolotherium is however not known from the Shara Murun Formation, unless Titanodectes is considered a synonym.

== Classification ==
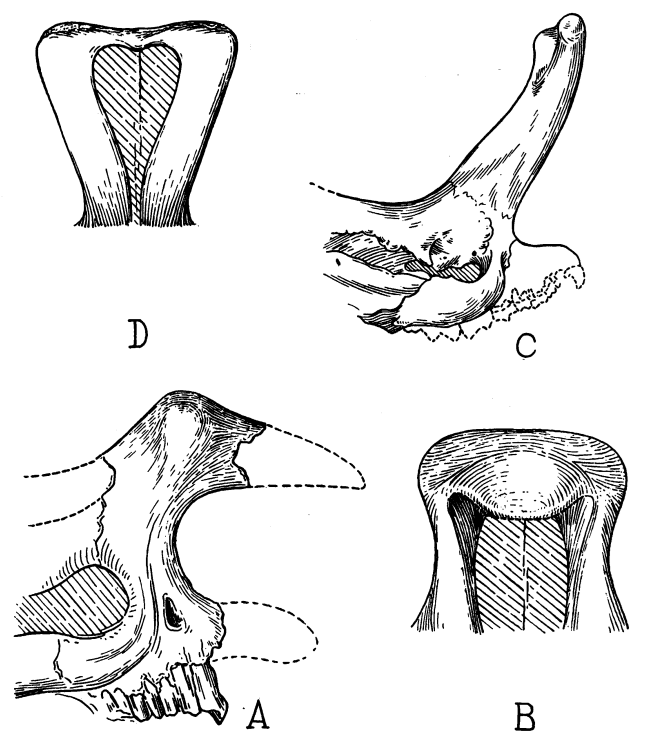
Ram of E. andrewsi (C, D) compared to the related Nasamplus (A, B), which had a primitive precursor structure

Skull of E. grangeri, Moscow Paleontological Museum

Osborn (1929) classified Embolotherium in a new brontothere subfamily, Embolotheriinae. Granger and Gregory continued to use Embolotheriinae, which in their 1943 revision included Embolotherium and Titanodectes. Osborn, Granger, and Gregory all believed that the Embolotheriinae represented a separate lineage of horned brontotheres from North American forms such as Diplacodon and Megacerops, that had evolved their unique skull morphology and large body size separately. Granger and Gregory speculated that Embolotherium had evolved from Titanodectes, which in turn had evolved from Protitan. In their provisional phylogeny of brontotheres, Embolotherium and North American horned brontotheres were distantly related, sharing a common ancestor as far back as the primitive Palaeosyops. Embolotheriinae continued to be used for Embolotherium and Titanodectes by George Gaylord Simpson in 1945, and by Malcolm McKenna and Susan K. Bell in 1997 (also adding Protembolotherium). In 2004, Matthew C. Mihlbachler, Spencer G. Lucas, Robert J. Emry, and Bolat Bayshashov conducted the first phylogenetic analysis of Asian horned brontotheres, and recovered several genera as close relatives of Embolotherium, which they added to Embolotheriinae. These genera included Aktautitan, Brachydiastematherium, and Metatitan.

In 2008, Mihlbachler performed a phylogenetic analysis of all brontotheres, and extensively revised brontothere taxonomy and systematics. Embolotheriinae as used in 2004 was recovered as a monophyletic group, but reranked to the level of infatribe, as Embolotheriita. Embolotheriita (or the "embolotheres") were found to all be characterized by an elevated nasal process with thin and deep lateral (side) walls, as well as narrowly spaced or fused horns. Asian horned brontotheres were further recovered as close relatives of North American horned brontotheres, all placed together in the subtribe Brontotheriina, of which primitive genera occur on both continents. Horns or large body sizes did thus not evolve independently in Asia and North America. Mihlbachler recovered Nasamplus and Protembolotherium as the closest relatives of Embolotherium. The cladogram below shows the primary strict reduced consensus tree from Mihlbachler's 2008 analysis, collapsed to show only Brontotheriina:

- Brontotheriina
  - Protitan grangeri
  - Protitan minor
  - - Protitanotherium emarginatum
    - - - Rhinotitan kaiseni
        - Rhinotitan andrewsi
      - - Pachytitan ajax
        - Diplacodon elatus
        - Brontotheriita
          ⊞
          - Parabrontops gobiensis
          - Protitanops curryi
          - - Eubrontotherium clarnoensis
            - - Dianotitan lunanensis
              - Duchesneodus uintensis
              - - Megacerops coloradensis
                - Megacerops kuwagatarhinus
          ⊟
      - Embolotheriita
        - - Aktautitan hippopotamopus
          - - Pollyosbornia altidens
            - Gnathotitan berkeyi
        - - Pygmaetitan panxianensis
          - - Brachydiastematherium transylvanicum
            - Metatitan khaitshinus
            - - Metatitan primus
              - Metatitan relictus
          - - Nasamplus progressus
            - - Protembolotherium efremovi
              - - Embolotherium andrewsi
                - Embolotherium grangeri

== Paleobiology ==
=== Ram ===
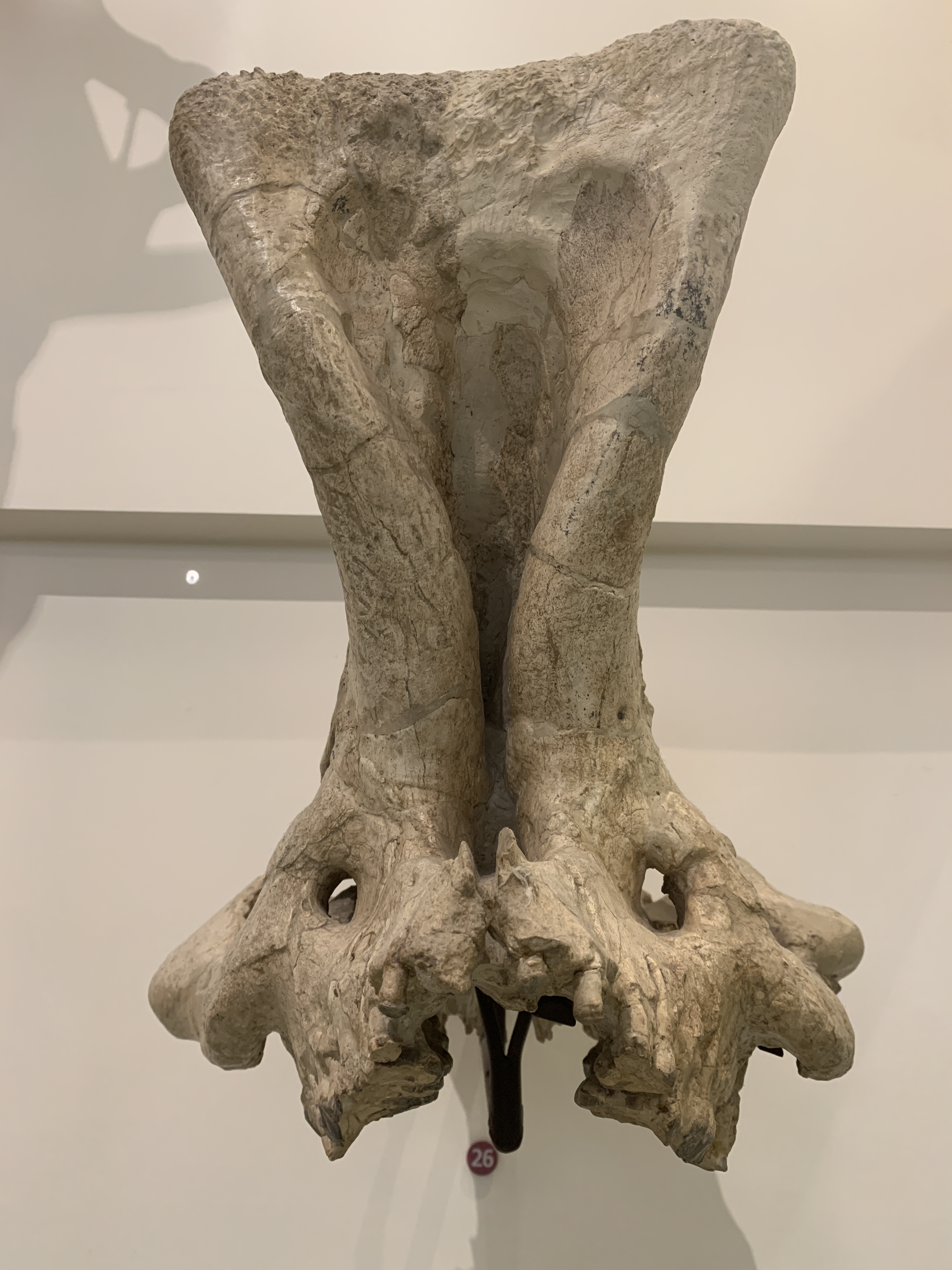
E. andrewsi skull, front view

Outdated restoration of E. andrewsi by Joy Buba, 1928

All horned brontotheres are characterized by the presence of frontonasal bony protuberances (horns). The protuberances of Embolotherium were fused into a single structure, the most ornate and highly derived protuberance of all brontotheres. The protuberance in Embolotherium is commonly referred to as the "ram", in-line with Osborn's original description. A similar structure is found only in the closely related Protembolotherium, though the ram of Protembolotherium was not as elaborate. The ram of Embolotherium evolved from the dual horns seen in other horned brontotheres. Over the course of the evolution of Embolotherium, the horns migrated upwards on the skull, and a connecting crest developed between the horns and grew forward and upwards together with them. The frontal and nasal bones were also incorporated into the structure. Protembolotherium preserves a more primitive state of ram development, and an even more primitive precursor structure is seen in Nasamplus.

Various interpretations of the unique structure have been published over the decades. In 1929, Osborn interpreted the ram as functioning as an actual horn, used for "battering, assaulting, charging, and tossing". 21st-century reinterpretations of the structure instead suggest that the ram of Embolotherium was incorporated into a large soft-tissue snout, and served to support a large nasal cavity. Deep channels on the lower surface of the ram, as well as the marker for the cartilaginous nasal septum, a thin ridge running along the ram, indicate that the nasal cavity of Embolotherium extended all the way to the top of the ram. E. grangeri must have had an enormous nasal cavity, far larger than that of E. andrewsi, indicated by the ram beginning further back on the skull and curving more forwards, creating a large space between itself and the jawbone.

The position of the nostrils in Embolotherium is uncertain. Life restorations traditionally depict the nostrils in a very low position, right above the premaxilla and in a normal, rhinoceros-like position. Due to the extension of the nasal cavity, it is also plausible that the nostrils were positioned on the peak of the ram. This hypothesis was first proposed in 2000 by Wang Ban-Yue, who described a well-preserved skull and associated lower jaw (IVPP V.11959) of E. andrewsi from the Ulan Gochu Formation.

=== Sexual dimorphism ===
In 2011, Mihlbachler reported that an unpublished quarry sample of E. grangeri from Mongolia shows evidence for sexual dimorphism. This sample reportedly contains fossils of some individuals with paired horns at the top of their rams, as well as individuals without these horns. Embolotherium did not exhibit sexual dimorphism in certain traits that were sexually dimorphic in several other brontotheres, such as canine size.

== Paleoecology ==
Skull of E. andrewsi (AMNH 26000) from multiple angles

The Erlian Basin, in which the Ulan Gochu and Ergilin Dzo formations are situated, experienced a subtropical and humid climate during the Eocene. The vegetation was highly diverse and dominated by deciduous trees and shrubs. The region was drier in the Ulangochuian and Ergilian than it had been during the Early Eocene, and was undergoing a gradual transition from dense forests to more steppe-like environments that would appear in the Oligocene. In the Ergilian, the environment was witnessing an increased aridification but had not yet fully transitioned into forest steppe. Because of the presence of brontotheres, and many low-crowned mammals, the Ergilin Dzo Formation must have remained relatively warm and humid. Primates are absent, and crocodyliforms are rare, which however suggests a somewhat open and more arid environment than similarly aged faunal assemblages in other parts of Eurasia.

The faunas of the Ulan Gochu, Ergilin Dzo, and contemporary formations, resembled the earlier faunas of the Irdinmanhan and Sharamurunian land mammal ages in their overall composition. Perissodactyls were a dominant group, particularly brontotheres and amynodonts. Tapiroids were not very diverse, and the first true rhinoceroses appeared during this time. Rodents were very diverse, with several groups, such as hedgehogs and shrews, making their first appearance in Asia. Mesonychids were present but rare. Artiodactyls were diverse, and represented by anthracotheres, entelodonts, and various ruminants. In many ways, the Ergilian fauna was a transitional fauna, retaining many groups from earlier parts of the Eocene but also including the first representatives of groups that would come to be prominent in the quite different faunas of the Oligocene. The Ergilin Dzo Formation, and thus the Ergilian land mammal age, was long considered to have been Oligocene in age but has been reassessed as Late Eocene, due to reassessments of the North American Chadronian, with which the Ergilian is correlated.

Embolotherium was a relatively common and widespread animal in its time. The genus coexisted with several other brontotheres, including Nasamplus, Titanodectes, and Metatitan in the Ulangochuian, and Protembolotherium and Eubrontotherium in the Ergilian. Contemporary predators included a variety of groups, such as nimravids (Nimravus), hyaenodonts (Hyaenodon), and mesonychids (Mongolestes and Metahapalodectes).
