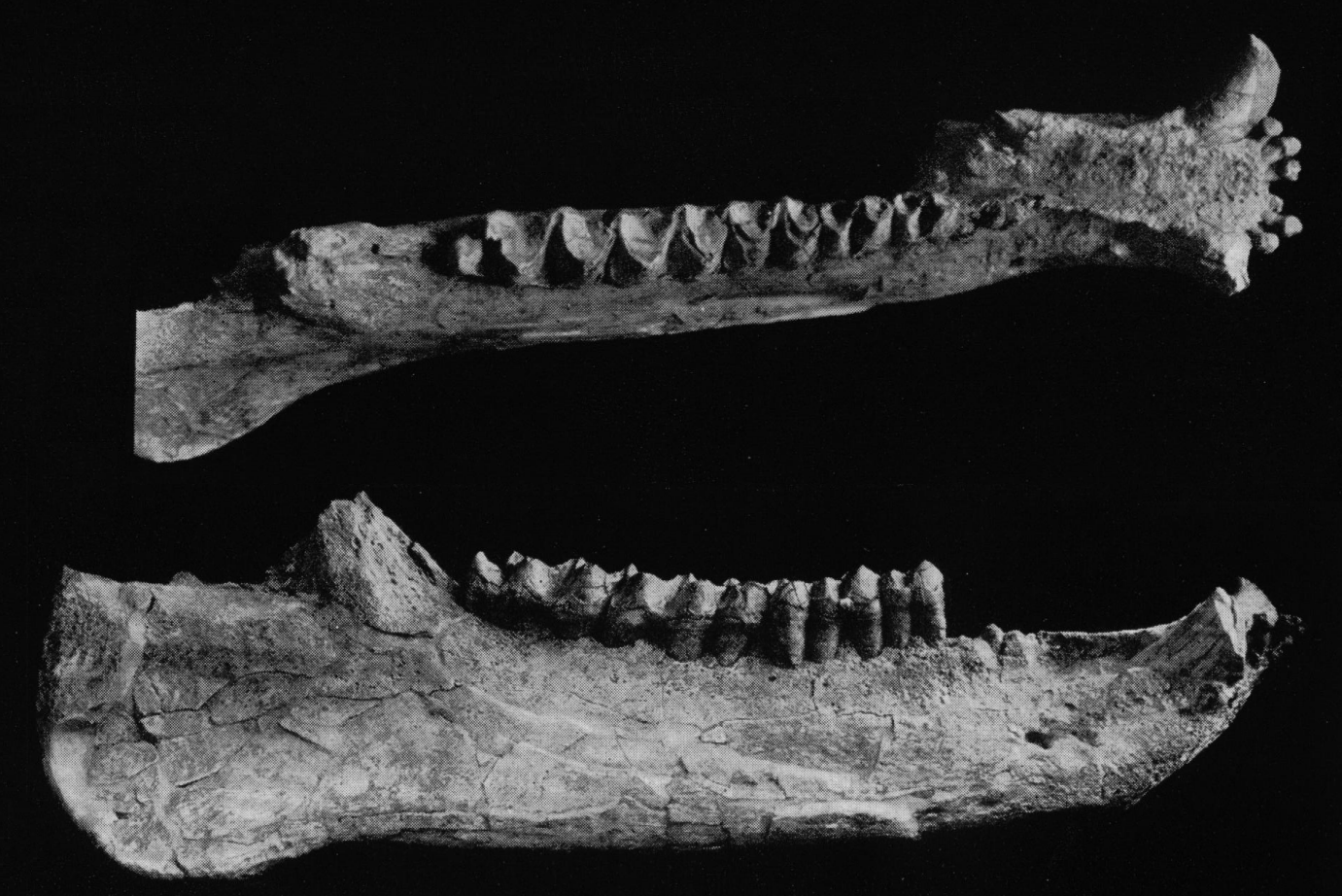
- Type specimen (AMNH 26401) of H. thomsoni, viewed from the top and the side

Scientific classification
- Kingdom: Animalia
- Phylum: Chordata
- Class: Mammalia
- Order: Perissodactyla
- Family: †Brontotheriidae
- Subfamily: †Brontotheriinae
- Tribe: †Brontotheriini
- Subtribe: †Telmatheriina (?)
- Genus: †Hyotitan; Granger & Gregory, 1943
- Species: †H. thomsoni

Binomial name
- †Hyotitan thomsoni Granger & Gregory, 1943

Synonyms
- Qufutitan zhoui? Wang & Wang, 1997

= Hyotitan =

Hyotitan Temporal range: Middle Eocene (Irdinmanhan), 47.8–42.7 Ma

Extinct genus of mammals

Hyotitan (lit. 'pig titan') is a dubious extinct genus of brontothere, known from the Middle Eocene of East Asia. A single species has been described, H. thomsoni, based on a nearly complete mandible from the Irdin Manha Formation in Inner Mongolia, China. Hyotitan was a large brontothere, distinguished mainly by its unusually large canines.

== Research history ==
Hyotitan thomsoni was described by Walter W. Granger and William King Gregory in 1943, based on AMNH 26401, a nearly complete mandible found at Camp Margetts (a 1920s camp for their expedition) in Inner Mongolia, China. Granger and Gregory assessed the mandible as being from the Houldjin Formation, but modern reassessments of the "Houldjin" sediments near Camp Margetts have reassessed them as being from the Irdin Manha Formation. Granger and Gregory distinguished the new genus and species by its very large and upcurved canines, relatively small incisors, and short and wide cheek teeth (premolars and molars).

The species name thomsoni honors Albert Thomson, who once served as the chief preparator at the Department of Paleontology at the American Museum of Natural History (AMNH). Thomson was also one of the expedition members on some of the Central Asiatic Expeditions of the AMNH, which had recovered fossils in Inner Mongolia.

== Description ==
Hyotitan was a large brontothere. The cheek teeth series of AMNH 26401 measures 30.9 centimeters (12.2 in).

Hyotitan had the lower dental formula 3.1.4.3. The incisors were arranged in a slightly arched row, and were all similar in size. The incisors of AMNH 26401 are nearly featureless, but this appears to be partially due to tooth wear. The incisor tooth crowns may originally have been subcaniniform (almost canine-like) or globular in shape. The canines were very large and tusk-like, and were followed by a very long diastema (gap between teeth) before the premolars. The premolars were broad and tall. Metaconids (one of the cusps) were present on the third and fourth premolars. The trigonid (shearing part) and talonid (crushing part) varied between the different premolars; in the second pair of premolars, the trigonid and talonid were about equally long; in the third and fourth pair of premolars, the trigonid was narrower than the talonid. The molars were also broad, and had shallow trigonid and talonid basins, and weak molar ribs. The third lower molar of Hyotitan is among the shortest known third lower molars in all brontotheres.

== Classification ==
In 1943, Granger and Gregory classified Hyotitan in the brontothere subfamily "Metatelmatheriinae". George Gaylord Simpson treated "Metatelmatheriinae" as a synonym of "Telmatheriinae" in 1945, as did Malcolm McKenna and Susan K. Bell in 1997. In modern brontothere taxonomy, "Telmatheriinae" corresponds to the infratribe Telmatheriina.

=== Possible synonymy with Qufutitan ===
In 2008, Matthew C. Mihlbachler designated Hyotitan thomsoni as a nomen dubium. Mihlbachler noted that AMNH 26401 preserves a unique combination of diagnostic features, including the unusually large canines, small but not entirely vestigial, incisors, an elongated mandibular symphysis (extending back to about the midpoint of the third premolar) and a very long diastema between the canines and the premolars. The canines of AMNH 26401 are particularly distinctive, since they are larger than those of all other brontothere mandibles of similar size, except AMNH 20014 (a mandible from Myanmar that may belong to Sivatitanops). AMNH 20014 is not conspecific with AMNH 26401, since the mandibular symphysis of AMNH 20014 is much shorter and its third lower molar is longer. Mihlbachler argued that Hyotitan thomsoni could be a synonym of Qufutitan zhoui (also classified in Telmatheriina), known from Shandong, further south. No mandibles of Q. zhoui are known, which makes comparison impossible, but AMNH 26401 matches what would be expected of Q. zhoui. Like Hyotitan, Qufutitan had (in its upper jaw) large canines, a long symphysis, an arched row of incisors, and a long diastema between the canines and premolars.

Should Qufutitan and Hyotitan be demonstrated to be synonyms, Hyotitan would have taxonomic priority since it is the older name, and Qufutitan would be designated a junior synonym. Mihlbachler (2008) designated Qufutitan as valid and Hyotitan as dubious, and not the other way around, because the holotype of Qufutitan (a partial skull) preserves more character state data.

== Paleoecology ==
The Erlian Basin, in which the Irdin Manha Formation is situated, experienced a subtropical and humid climate during the Eocene. The vegetation was highly diverse and dominated by deciduous trees and shrubs. The habitat during the Irdinmanhan land mammal age was more forest-dominated than the drier and probably more open habitats of the subsequent Sharamurunian.

Perissodactyls were a dominant component of the Irdinmanhan mammal fauna. Other brontotheres known from the Irdin Manha Formation include Gnathotitan, Metatelmatherium, and Protitan. Other perissodactyl groups represented included lophialetids, rhodopagids, deperetellids, helaletids, as well as various rhinocerotoids, including amynodonts. Several artiodactyls are also known, including the giant Andrewsarchus. Other groups of large mammals known from the Irdin Manha Formation include dinoceratans, cimolestans, and mesonychians such as Hapalodectes and Mongolonyx.
