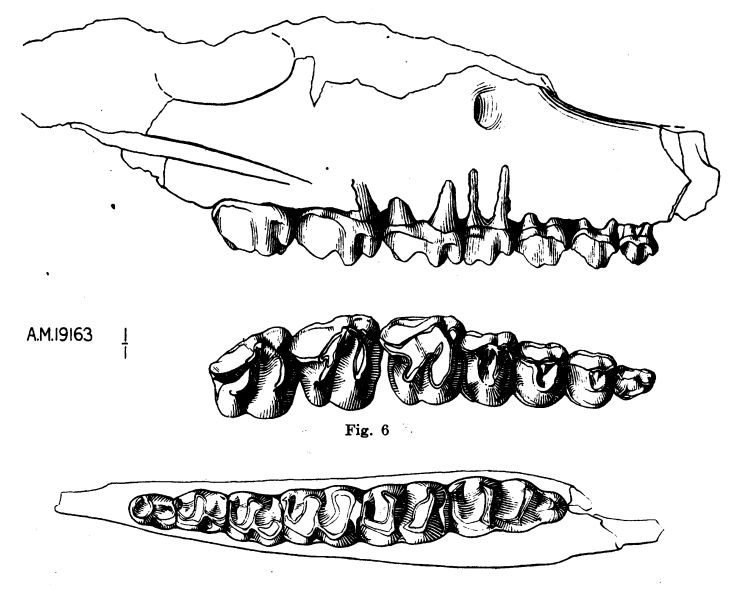
- Fossil jaw of Lophialetes

Scientific classification
- Kingdom: Animalia
- Phylum: Chordata
- Class: Mammalia
- Order: Perissodactyla
- Superfamily: Tapiroidea
- Family: †Lophialetidae; Matthew & Granger, 1925

Genera
- †Breviodon?; †Eoletes; †Kalakotia; †Lophialetes; †Minchenoletes; †Schlosseria; †Simplaletes; †Zhongjianoletes

= Lophialetidae =

Lophialetidae Temporal range: Early - Middle Eocene

Family of odd-toed ungulates

Lophialetidae is an extinct family of tapiroids known from the Early to Middle Eocene of Asia.
