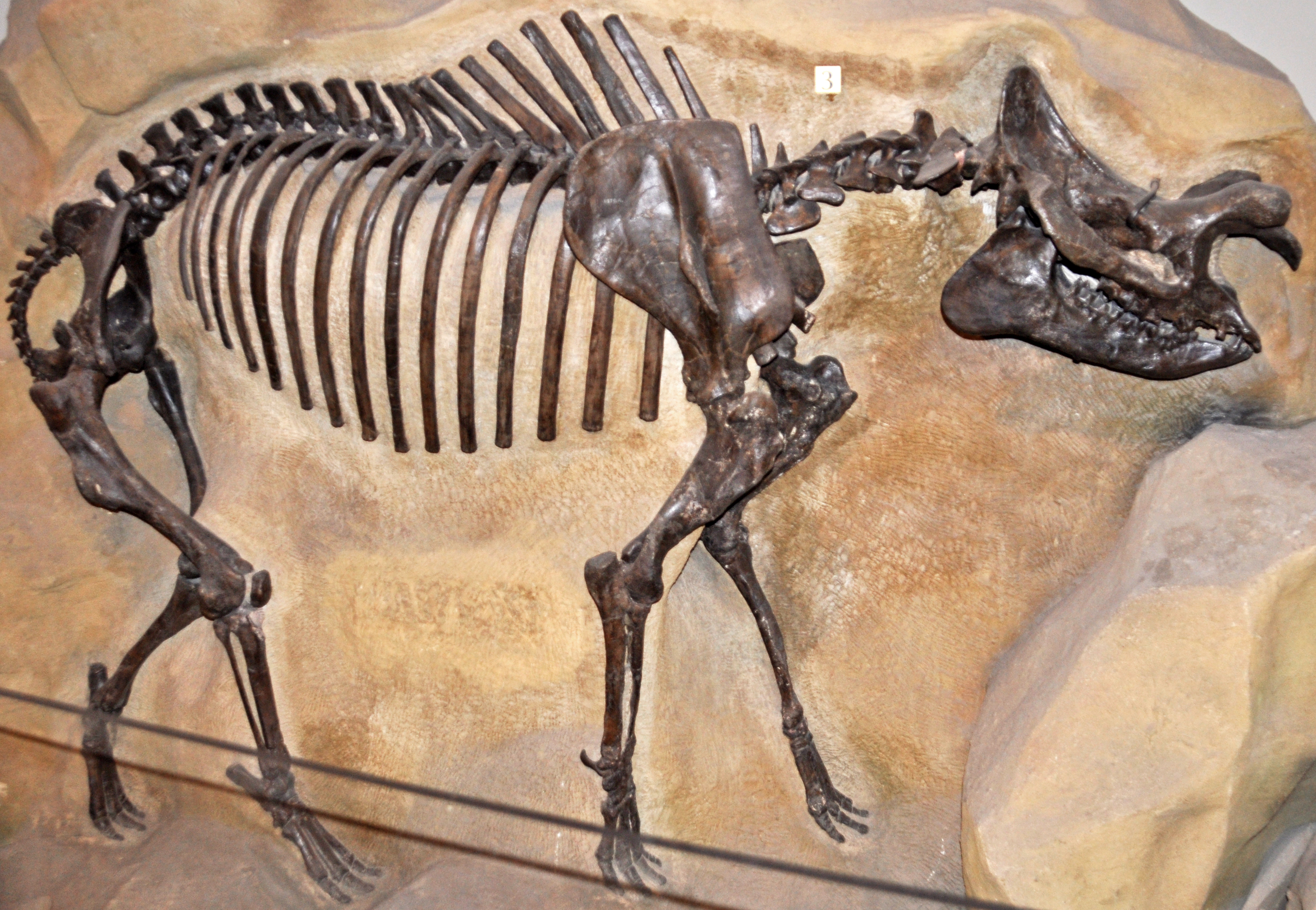
- Mounted skeleton (CM 11879) of D. elatus, Carnegie Museum of Natural History

Scientific classification
- Kingdom: Animalia
- Phylum: Chordata
- Class: Mammalia
- Order: Perissodactyla
- Family: †Brontotheriidae
- Subfamily: †Brontotheriinae
- Tribe: †Brontotheriini
- Subtribe: †Brontotheriina
- Genus: †Diplacodon; Marsh, 1875

Type species
- †Diplacodon elatus Marsh, 1875

Other species
- †D. gigan Mihlbachler, 2011

Synonyms
- Genus synonymy: Eotitanotherium Peterson, 1914; Pseudodiplacodon Mader, 2000; Synonyms of D. elatus: Diploceras osborni Peterson, 1914; Diplacodon progressum Peterson, 1934; Eotitanotherium osborni (Peterson, 1914); Pseudodiplacodon progressum (Peterson, 1934)

= Diplacodon =

Diplacodon Temporal range: Middle Eocene (late Uintan), 42.8–40.1 Ma

Extinct genus of mammals

Diplacodon (lit. 'double-pointed tooth') is an extinct genus of horned brontothere that lived in North America during the Middle Eocene, in the late Uintan land mammal age. Two Diplacodon species are recognized, the type species D. elatus from the Uinta Formation and the larger D. gigan from the Wiggins Formation.

Diplacodon was comparable in size to a modern rhinoceros. Similar to some other brontotheres, fossils assigned to D. elatus vary in the size and morphology of the teeth and horns. These variations have been argued to differentiate the fossils at the species level or even genus level. Recent revisions instead favor the variation as the result of sexual dimorphism and other individual variation, also documented in other brontotheres. D. gigan is known from a single skull, complicating studies on intraspecific variation.

Diplacodon and other contemporary North American brontotheres, such as Protitanotherium, were part of an early evolutionary radiation of horned brontotheres (the subtribe Brontotheriina) in North America during the Middle Eocene and were descended from Central Asian ancestors. Diplacodon and its close relatives ultimately gave rise to the larger brontotheres of the Brontotheriita infratribe, such as Megacerops.

== Research history ==
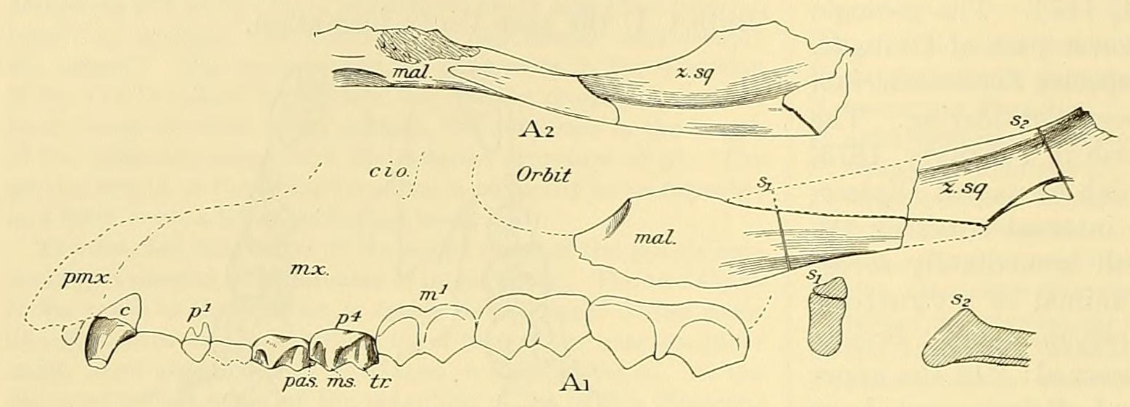
YPM 11180, the type specimen of D. elatus

Diplacodon elatus was described by Othniel Charles Marsh in 1875, based on the partial skull YPM 11180 from the Myton Member of the Uinta Formation in Utah. YPM 11180 is dorsoventrally (from the front to the back) crushed but preserves several largely undistorted teeth. Parts of the skeleton associated with YPM 11180 were also recovered and described. Marsh considered YPM 11180 to exhibit traits intermediate between Limnohyus (now considered a synonym of Palaeosyops) and Brontotherium (now considered a synonym of Megacerops). According to Marsh, D. elatus resembled Brontotherium more in the form of the incisors and canines while it was closer to Limnohyus in the premolars and molars, and in parts of the skeleton, particularly the limbs and vertebrae. Marsh questionably asserted that D. elatus was hornless; the fossil is too damaged to tell whether horns were originally present. The description of Diplacodon marked an important step in the study of brontotheres since the fossil provided a link between more primitive brontotheres found in the Green River Basin and more derived forms from the White River Group (e.g. Megacerops).

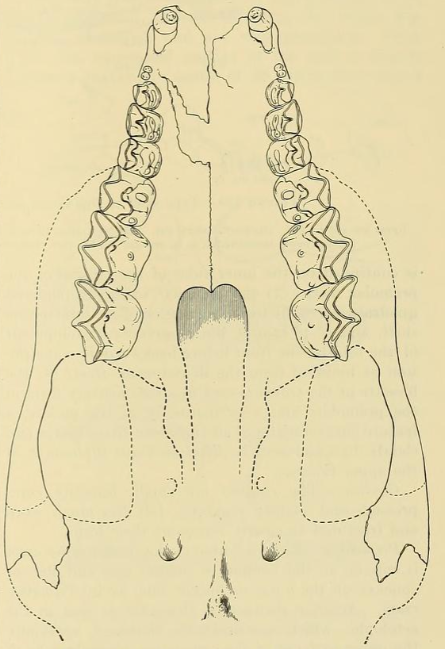
Underside of YPM 11180, showing the preserved dentition

The name Diplacodon means "double-pointed tooth", deriving from Ancient Greek διπλόoς (double), ἀκή (a point), and ὀδούς (tooth), and refers to upper premolars having two inner cones. The species name, elatus, means "lofty" in Latin. Marsh did not explain the meaning behind the species name. In a major 1929 brontothere monograph, Henry Fairfield Osborn speculated that Marsh used elatus either due to the large size of YPM 11180 or due to its apparently "advanced stage of evolution".

In 1895, John Bell Hatcher described the new species Diplacodon emarginatus, based on another partial skull from the Uinta Formation (YPM PU 11242), which preserves small horns. According to Hatcher, this did not preclude its classification in Diplacodon since Marsh's description of D. elatus as hornless "is entirely conjectural". Hatcher considered D. emarginatus to otherwise agree with all the characters established by Marsh for Diplacodon. Should D. elatus prove to actually be hornless, Hatcher noted that D. emarginatus may be reclassified in a new genus "which may be called Protitanotherium". Osborn (1929) considered D. emarginatus to belong to a distinct genus due to additional characteristics, for which he used Hatcher's Protitanotherium as a valid name. Protitanotherium has been maintained as a distinct genus by later researchers.

In 1914, Olof August Peterson named the new species Diploceras osborni based on fossils from the Uinta Formation, including a partial skull and jaw (CMNH 2859, the type specimen) and another partial skull (CMNH 2858, designated as a paratype). CMNH 2858 had noticeably more rugose horns, which Peterson attributed to sexual dimorphism. In the same year, Peterson discovered that the name Diploceras was preoccupied and moved D. osborni to the new genus Eotitanotherium. Peterson did not clearly distinguish his new species from D. elatus but noted that Eotitanotherium had certain differences in the dentition, such as more distinct lingual cusps on P3 (premolar 3), a less ridge-like deuterocone (cusp) on P2, and blunter and shorter canines.

In a posthumous publication in 1934, Peterson named another species of brontothere from the Uinta Formation, Diplacodon progressum. This species was based on a nearly complete skeleton (CMNH 11879), with the skull (CMNH 11879A) designated as the type specimen. Peterson did not clearly explain why D. progressum was referred to Diplacodon. D. progressum was distinguished from D. elatus by two features: a more molarized (development of molar-like features) premolar series in D. progressum than in D. elatus, the more "perfectly quadrate" shape of individual teeth of D. progressum (especially P2), and D. elatus having a longer "facial region" than D. progressum. D. progressum was distinguished from E. osborni by shorter and heavier nasal bones, and a "noticeably shorter" alveolar border of the premaxilla.

Additional brontothere specimens from the Uinta Formation continued to be assigned to Eotitanotherium osborni and Diplacodon progressum over the course of the 20th century. These fossils vary mosty in the robustness of the skull, particularly the thickness of nasal bones and size of the horns, and by whether the lingual (tongue-side) cusps of the premolar teeth are separated or connected by a small lingual crest.

=== Taxonomy of D. elatus ===
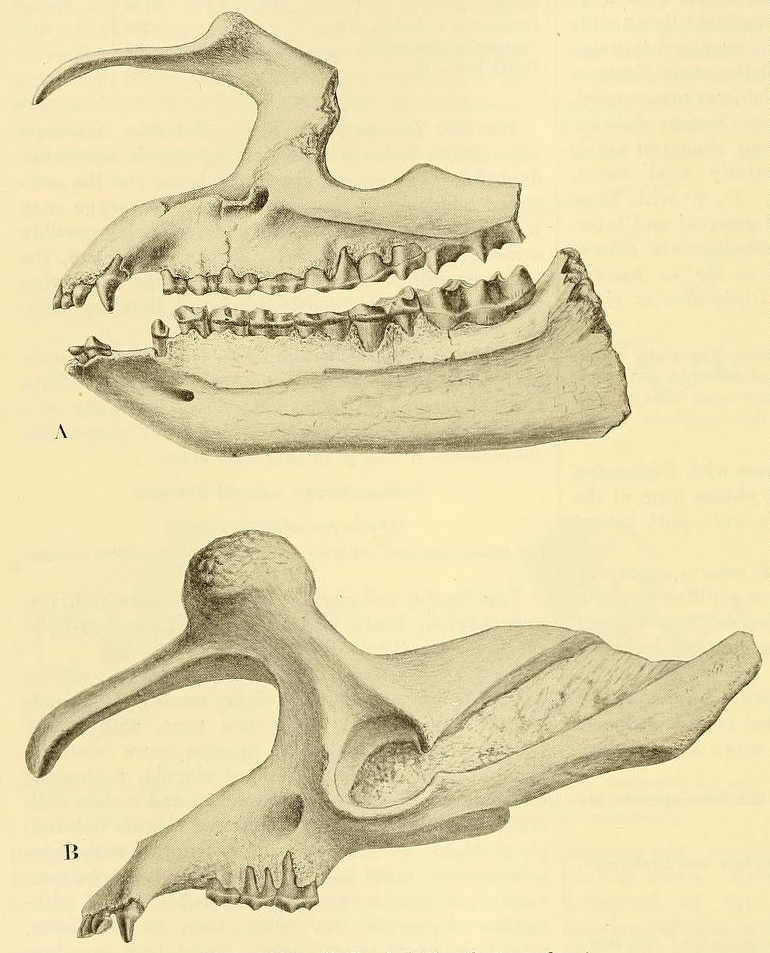
CMNH 2859 (A) and CMNH 2858 (B), the type and paratype specimens of Eotitanotherium osborni

Osborn (1929) considered Diplacodon, and D. elatus, to be a valid taxon and based on an "excellent type". Although Osborn noticed substantial similarities between D. elatus and E. osborni, he considered Eotitanotherium to be provisionally distinct due to the characteristics of its premolars.

In a series of studies between 1989 and 1998, Bryn J. Mader deemed YPM 11180 to be too crushed to be compared to the more complete fossils that had been discovered since 1875. Diplacodon elatus was thus designated as a nomen dubium. Mader noted that YPM 11180 was "extremely similar" to CMNH 2858, the paratype skull of E. osborni, and thus suggested the possibility that Diplacodon elatus was a senior synonym of Eotitanotherium osborni. In 2000, Mader moved D. progressum to a new genus, Pseudodiplacodon. Mader differentiated Pseudodiplacodon from Eotitanotherium based on features of the teeth and horns, especially that the lingual cusps on P4 were poorly separated in Pseudodiplacodon and well-separated in Eotitanotherium. Mader also considered the cross-sectional shape of the horns to differentiate the two genera; Pseudodiplacodon was distinguished by a more circular cross-sectional shape and Eotitanotherium by a more elliptical cross-sectional shape.

In both 2005 and 2008, Matthew C. Mihlbachler disagreed with Mader's assessment and referred all fossils previously assigned to Eotitanotherium and Pseudodiplacodon to a single taxon. If all fossils were to belong to the same taxon, the oldest available name takes priority, i.e. Diplacodon elatus. Mihlbachler questioned all of the features used by Peterson to distinguish D. elatus, D (P.) progressum, and E. osborni. Some of Peterson's differences could be attributed to the different sizes and degrees of completion of the specimens, several features were deemed to not be taxonomically relevant, and some of Peterson's observations could not be confirmed.

Mihlbachler considered the features used by Mader to separate Eotitanotherium and Pseudodiplacodon to most likely be the result of individual variation. Mihlbachler also questioned Mader's analysis, noting that several specimens assigned to Pseudodiplacodon by Mader had horns intermediate in size between those of the E. osborni and D. progressum holotypes, that Pseudodiplacodon specimens seemed to vary in the separation of the lingual cusps, and that the nasal bones of a specimen referred to Eotitanotherium by Mader were as thick as the same bones in Pseudodiplacodon specimens. Eotitanotherium and Pseudodiplacodon were found to not be separable into distinct units that could be validly diagnosed and were thus designated as junior synonyms of D. elatus. The apparent differences in horn sizes between Pseuodiplacodon and Eotitanotherium are consistent with intraspecific variation observed in other horned brontothere genera, such as Megacerops and Duchesneodus.

In 2008 and 2009, Mader rejected Mihlbachler's revision and maintained Pseuodiplacodon and Eotitanotherium as distinct. Mader added an additional differentiating feature, that tooth rows tended to be shorter in Pseudodiplacodon, despite Pseusodiplacodon being larger than Eotitanotherium. Mader considered the variation exhibited in Duchesneodus minor in comparison to that he observed between Pseudodiplacodon and Eotitanotherium. In the 2011 description of D. gigan, Mihlbachler maintained that the logical interpretation of the fossils was that differences between Pseudodiplacodon and Eotitanotherium were due to individual variation and sexual dimorphism. Mihlbachler noted that the canine sizes of the fossils could be used to group the fossil assemblage into two clusters, most likely representing male and female specimens. If grouped in this way, it was apparent that the cross-sectional shape of the horns did not appear to vary consistently with either the size of the canines or the size of the horns, further indicating that Mader's Pseudodiplacodon and Eotitanotherium were not separable taxa. Other scholars have followed Mihlbachler's revision and treated specimens formerly assigned to Pseudodiplacodon and Eotitanotherium as specimens of D. elatus.

=== Taxonomy of D. gigan ===
In 1982, a well-preserved brontothere skull (AMNH 117163) was discovered in the Wiggins Formation in Hot Springs County, Wyoming, most likely Uintan in age. Both Mihlbachler (2008) and Mader (2009) preliminarily proposed that the skull was from a new brontothere species. Mader described the specimen in 2009 and referred it to cf. Protitanotherium sp., based on similarities in size to the Protitanotherium type specimen (YPM PU 11242), similarities in the cross-sectional shape of the horn, and similar canine size.

Mihlbachler disagreed with Mader's assessment in 2011, contending that many of the features used to refer the fossil to Protitanotherium (features of the canines and horns) were probably sexually dimorphic traits in brontotheres, and that Mader had not performed a phylogenetic analysis to show that the fossil fell within Protitanotherium. Mihlbachler instead referred AMNH 117163 to Diplacodon, noting that the skull shared a unique morphology of the nasal bone only with D. elatus. AMNH 117163 is distinct from other Diplacodon specimens in several respects. These differences include the skull's larger size, and that its dorsal (upper side) surface is more constricted by the parasagittal ridges (front-to-back bony ridges) than in D. elatus skulls. A phylogenetic analysis performed by Mihlbachler recovered AMNH 117163 as outside Protitanotherium and as the sister taxon of D. elatus. Mihlbachler designated the skull as the type specimen of the new species Diplacodon gigan. The name gigan derives from the kaiju Gigan and references D. gigan's greater size compared to D. elatus.

== Description ==
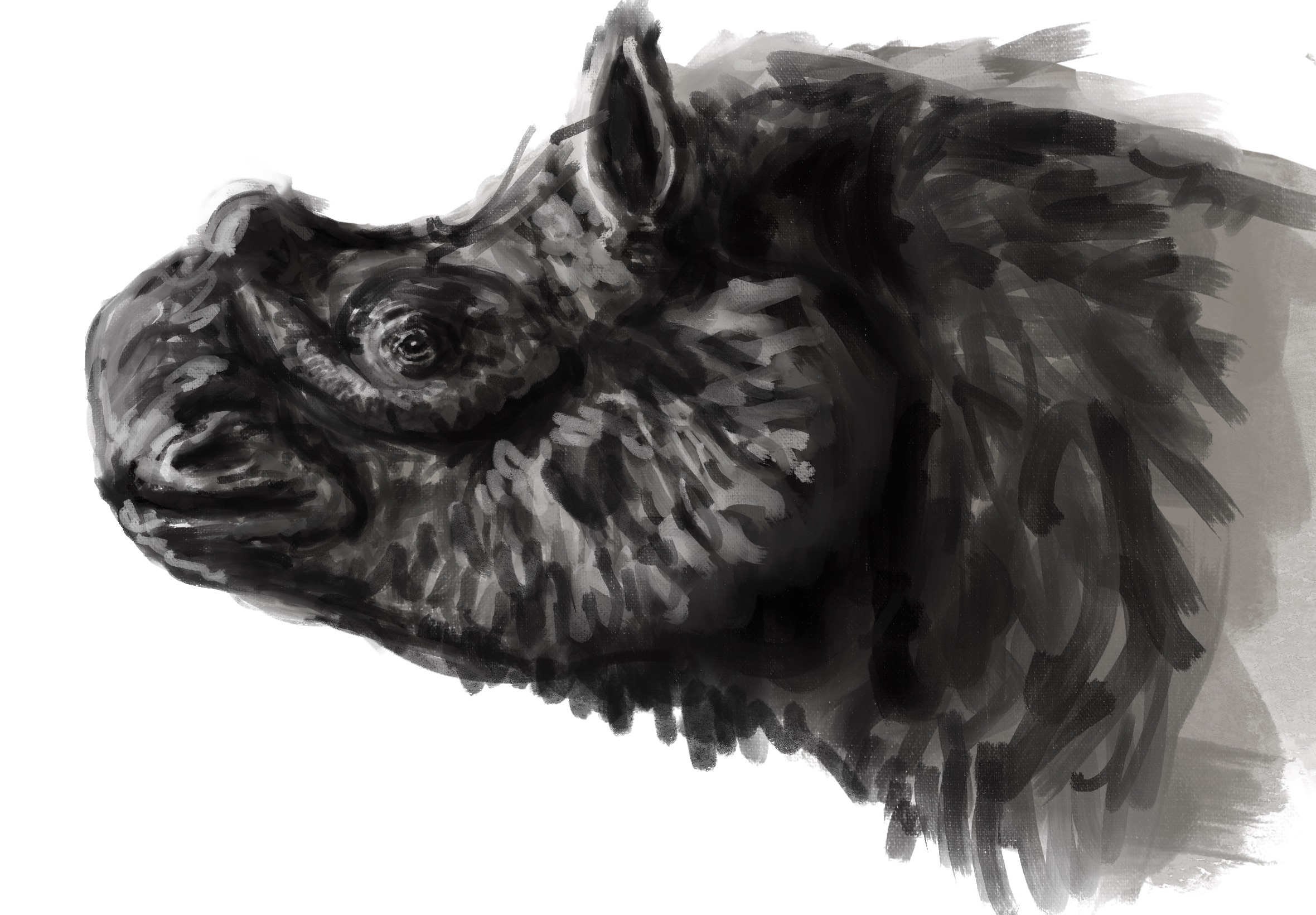
Restoration of the head of D. elatus

Diplacodon elatus was about the size of a modern rhinoceros, small when compared to most other horned brontotheres. D. elatus was for instance smaller than the closely related Protitanotherium and Protitan grangeri, but bigger than Protitan minor. D. gigan was larger than D. elatus based on the size of its skull (the only part known of D. gigan). D. elatus skulls vary in size in the range 50–60.7 centimetres (19.7–23.9 in), whereas the type skull of D. gigan measures 72 centimetres (28 in). D. elatus have been estimated to have reached a body mass of 1,114 kilograms (2,456 lb), and D. gigan to have reached a body mass of 1,488 kilograms (3,280 lb).

Like other brontotheres, Diplacodon had a saddle-shaped skull. Diplacodon had more elevated horns than many of its close relatives, such as Protitanotherium, Rhinotitan, and Protitan. The horns varied considerably in size from being very small rugose ridges to quite massive, though never as large as in some later brontoetheres (e.g. Megacerops). The orientation and position of the horns varied very little between individuals, projecting above the eye orbits at a 45° angle. The position and orientation of the horns in Diplacodon is more similar to derived brontotheres such as Aktautitan and Metatitan, than to the horns of Protitan and Protitanotherium. The nasal process of Diplacodon was also elevated higher than in Protitan and Protitanotherium, but not as highly as in Aktautitan and Metatitan.

The most distinguishing anatomical feature of Diplacodon, present in both D. elatus and D. gigan to the exclusion of all other brontotheres, is the nasal bone, which is thickened and upturned at the lateral (towards the sides) margins. It is possible that D. gigan varied from D. elatus in a more elliptical cross-sectional shape of the horns and larger canines. These traits have an unclear usefulness in brontothere taxonomy and may also be sexually dimorphic. More fossils are required to assess individual variation within D. gigan.

Diplacodon elatus had the dental formula 3.1.4.33.1.4.3 . The incisors of Diplacodon were small, but not as reduced as they were in more derived brontotheres (e.g. Megacerops).

== Classification ==
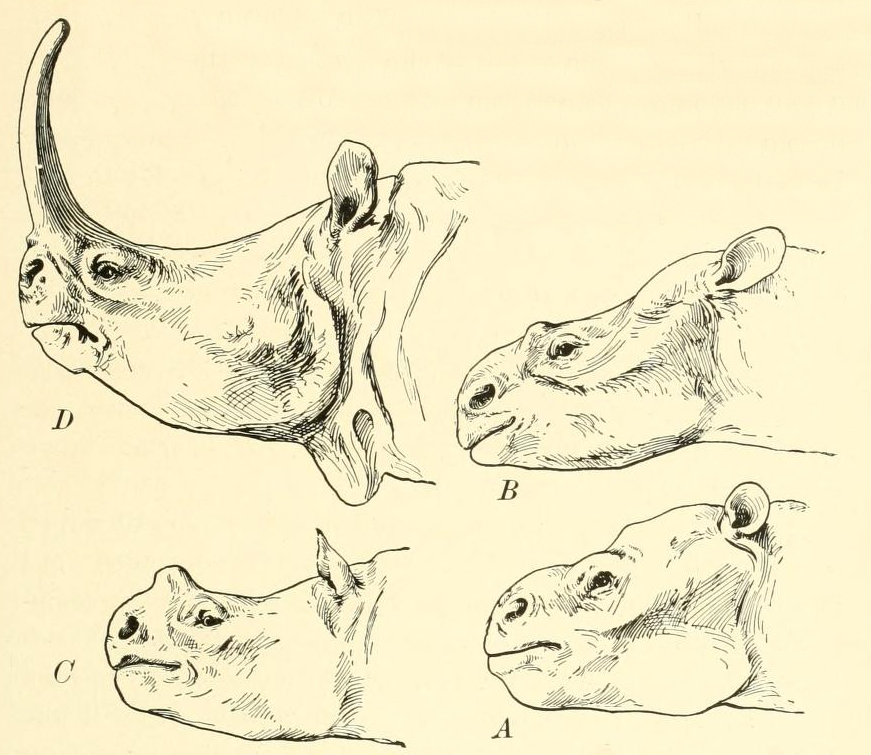
Restorations of the heads of various brontotheres by William Berryman Scott (1913), A: Palaeosyops, B: "Manteoceras" (=Telmatherium), C: Diplacodon, and D: "Titanotherium" (=Megacerops).

Per Mihlbachler's 2008 revision, Diplacodon is classified as part of the brontothere subtribe Brontotheriina, alongside the genera Pachytitan, Protitan, Protitanotherium, and Rhinotitan. Brontotheriina also includes two infratribes of more derived brontotheres, Embolotheriita and Brontotheriita. Diplacodon and similar more basal members of the group have sometimes been informally referred to as "diplacodonts", though this is not a formal taxon. Diplacodon and other contemporary North American brontotheres (e.g. Protitanotherium) were part of an evolutionary radiation of brontotheres in North America and were descended from ancestral forms in Central Asia. Brontotheres that appeared during the Uintan raditation of the group in North America are believed to have later given rise to the larger forms in the Brontotheriita infratribe.

In the 2011 description of D. gigan, Mihlbachler published three strict consensus trees of the Brontotheriina (and the sister taxon Epimanteoceras) as the results of his phylogenetic analysis. The analyses treated Protitanotherium differently to account for divering opinions on the diversity of that genus. Topology A below treats Protitanotherium as envisioned by Mihlbachler, whereas Topology C treats the specimen TMM 41723-3 as a separate taxon, which has been suggested by Mader. In Topology B, further specimens likely conspecific with TMM 41723-3 have also been included in an experimental additional taxon.

Topology A: Protitanotherium emarginatum sensu lato (per Mihlbachler)

- - Epimanteoceras
  - Brontotheriina
    - Protitan
    - - Embolotheriita
      - Rhinotitan
      - - Protitanotherium emarginatum (sensu lato)
        - Pachytitan ajax
        - - Diplacodon elatus
          - Diplacodon gigan
        - Brontotheriita

Topology B: P. emarginatum specimens TMM 41723-3, 41723-6, and 41747-106 coded separately as "Sthenodectes australis".

- - Epimanteoceras
  - Brontotheriina
    - Protitan
    - - Embolotheriita
      - Rhinotitan
      - - "Sthenodectes australis"
        - Protitanotherium emarginatum (sensu stricto)
        - Pachytitan ajax
        - - Diplacodon elatus
          - Diplacodon gigan
        - Brontotheriita

Topology C: P. emarginatum specimen TMM 41723-3 coded separately.

- - Epimanteoceras
  - Brontotheriina
    - Protitan
    - - Rhinotitan
      - Embolotheriita
      - - Protitanotherium emarginatum (sensu stricto)
        - TMM 41723-3
        - Pachytitan ajax
        - Diplacodon elatus
        - Diplacodon gigan
        - Brontotheriita
