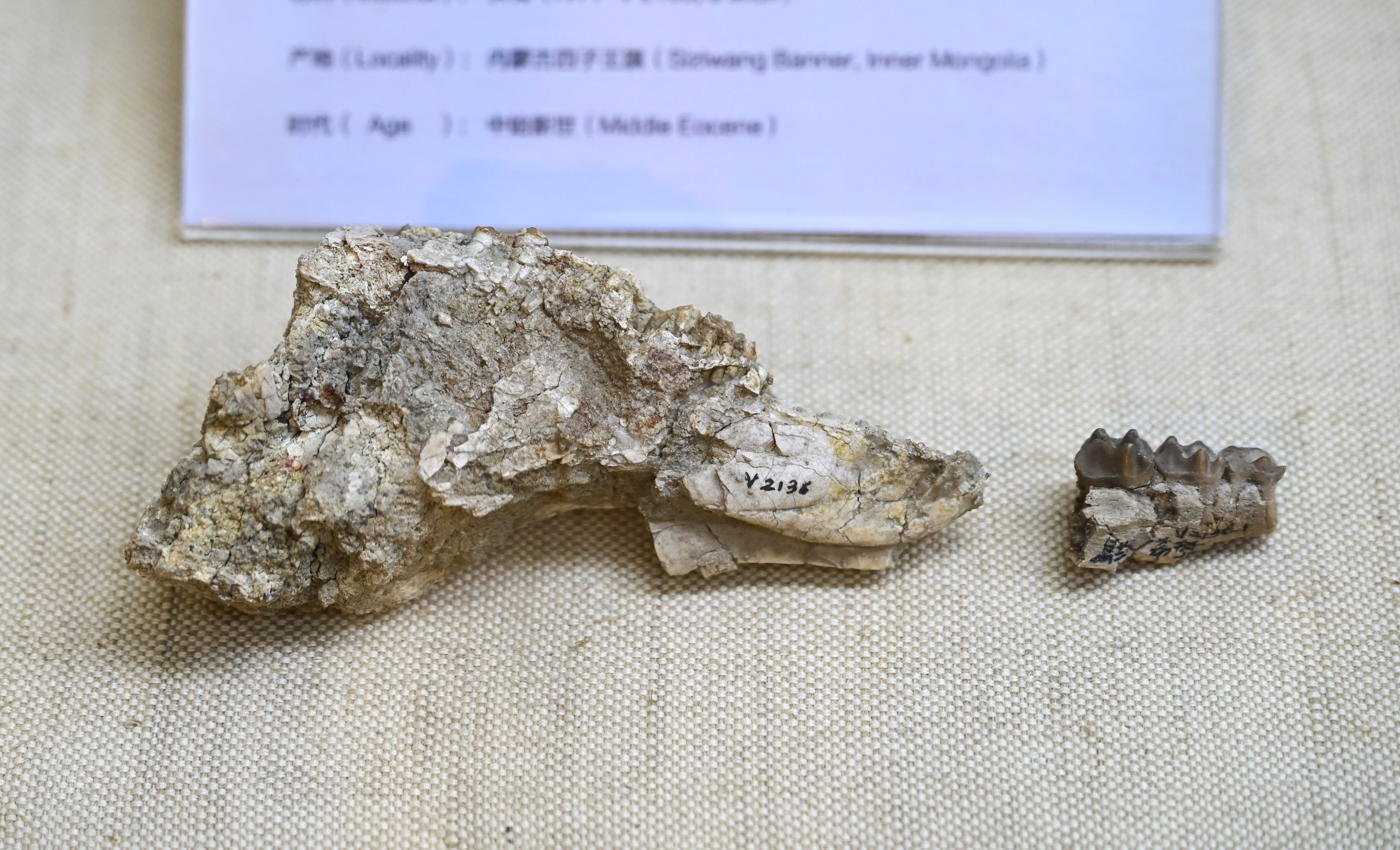
- Fossil specimen, Paleozoological Museum of China

Scientific classification
- Kingdom: Animalia
- Phylum: Chordata
- Class: Mammalia
- Order: Perissodactyla
- Family: †Lophialetidae
- Genus: †Lophialetes; Matthew and Granger, 1925

= Lophialetes =

Lophialetes Temporal range: Eocene

Extinct genus of mammals

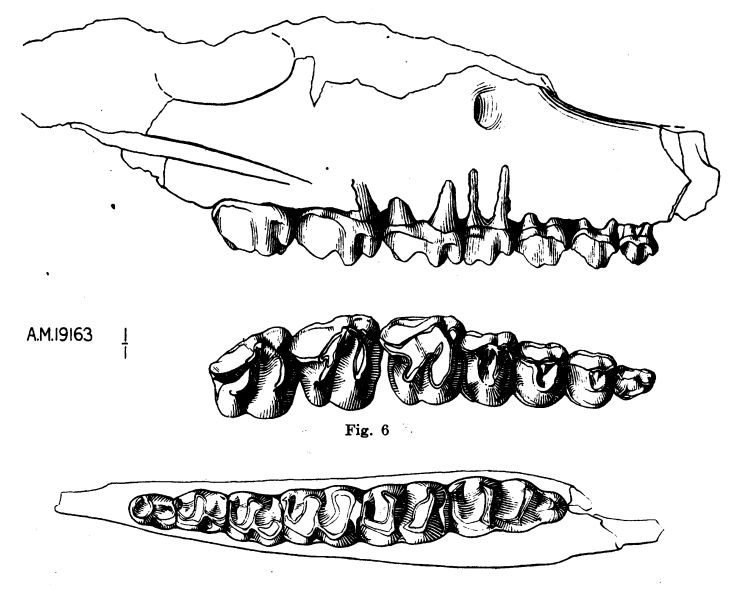
Type specimen of L. expeditus

Lophialetes is an extinct genus of lophialetid from the Eocene epoch found in China.

== Palaeoecology ==
Dental microwear reveals that L. expeditus was a mixed feeder that incorporated a small amount of fruit and large quantities of grit in its diet.
