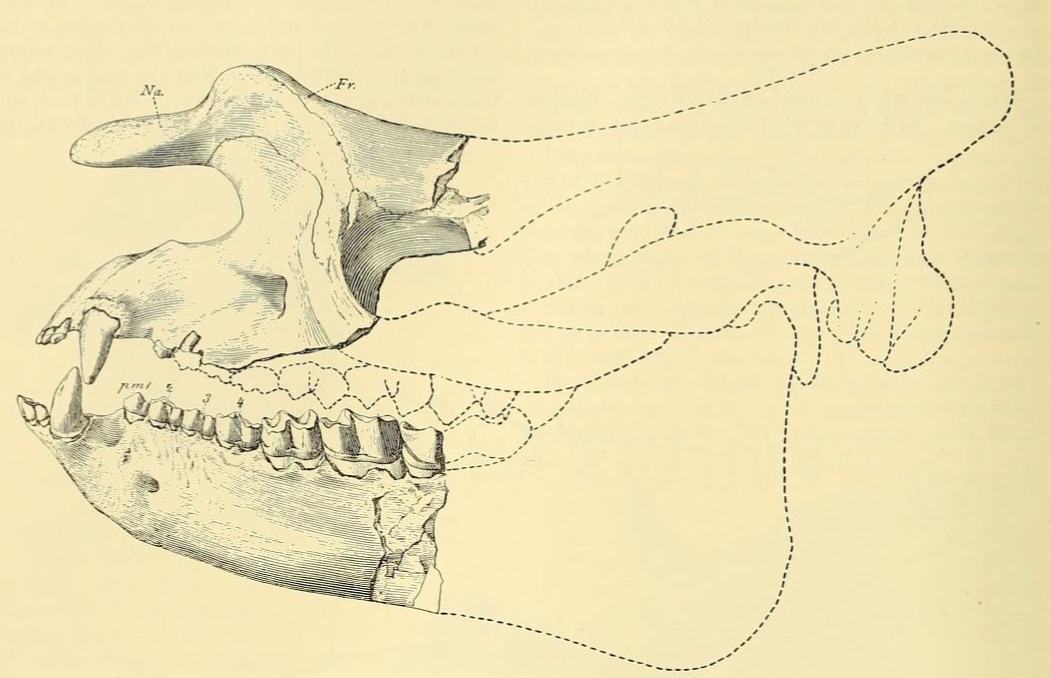
- Type skull of P. emarginatum

Scientific classification
- Kingdom: Animalia
- Phylum: Chordata
- Class: Mammalia
- Order: Perissodactyla
- Family: †Brontotheriidae
- Subfamily: †Brontotheriinae
- Tribe: †Brontotheriini
- Subtribe: †Brontotheriina
- Genus: †Protitanotherium; Hatcher, 1895
- Species: †P. emarginatum

Binomial name
- †Protitanotherium emarginatum Hatcher, 1895

Synonyms
- Diplacodon emarginatum Hatcher, 1895; Protitanotherium superbum Osborn, 1908; Sthenodectes australis Wilson, 1977

= Protitanotherium =

Protitanotherium Temporal range: Middle Eocene (late Uintan), 42.8–40.1 Ma

Extinct genus of ungulates

Protitanotherium is an extinct genus of horned brontothere that lived in North America during the Middle Eocene, in the late Uintan land mammal age.

== Research history ==
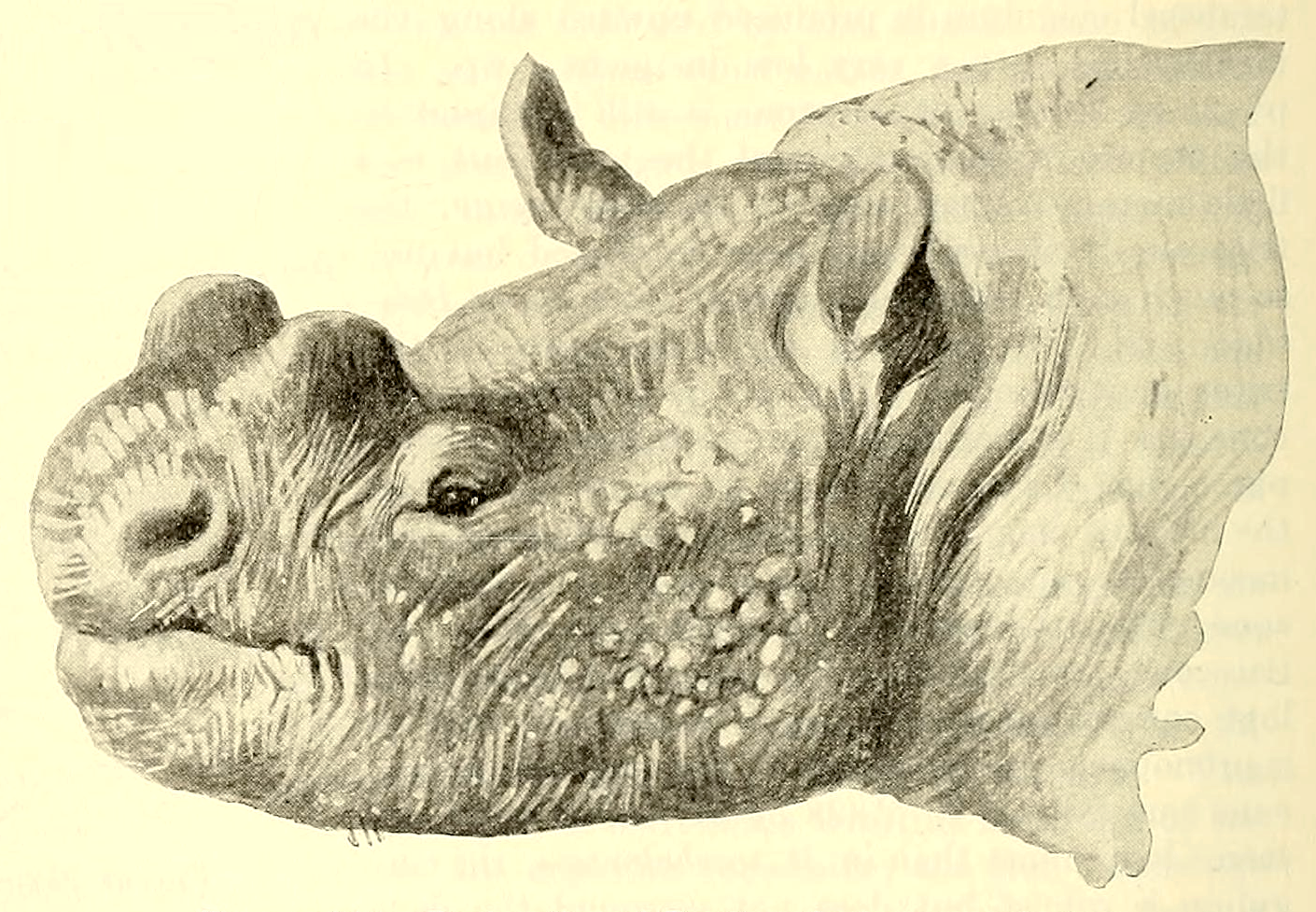
Life restoration of P. emarginatum by Charles R. Knight

In 1895, John Bell Hatcher described a partial cranial material from the Uinta Formation of Utah, YPM-PU 11242, as the holotype of a new species of brontothere. He tentatively included the taxon as a species of Diplacodon (D. emarginatum), but he noted that "should future discoveries show that there are hornless forms with same dental characters as Diplacodon", it would require a new genus name Protitanotherium.

The genus name is a portmanteau of the Latin word meaning "before" (pro) and Ancient Greek words meaning "giant" (titan) and "beast" (therion). It was later accepted for use by other authors including Osborn (1908) who named a putative second species P. superbum (AMNH 2501) from the same locality, but this species was later synonymized with P. emarginatum.

It was once claimed that Sthenodectes australis (TMM 41723-3) described by Wilson (1977) from the Pruett Formation of Texas and some skull specimens from other formations (Uinta Formation, Wiggins Formation and Devil's Graveyard Formation) might represent a single taxon similar to P. emarginatum, but Mihlbachler suggested that Sthenodectes australis is synonymous with P. emarginatum and redescribed the Wiggins Formation specimen (AMNH 117163), previously referred to as cf. Protitanotherium, as the holotype of Diplacodon gigan. Fragmentary brontothere specimens from the middle to late Eocene strata of North Korea were named as P. koreanicum by Takai (1939), but this species is now considered as a nomen dubium.
