= William King Gregory =

American zoologist (1876–1970)

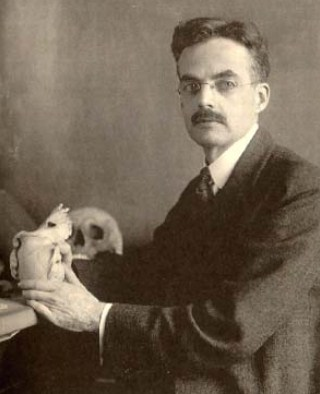
- Born: May 19, 1876; Greenwich Village, New York
- Died: December 29, 1970 (aged 94); Woodstock, New York
- Education: Columbia University
- Known for: Expert on mammalian dentition
- Spouses: Laura Grace Foote; Angela DuBois
- Awards: National Academy of Sciences
- Scientific career
- Fields: Zoology
- Institutions: American Museum of Natural History, Columbia University
- Thesis: The Orders of Mammals (1910)
- Doctoral advisor: Henry Fairfield Osborn
- Doctoral students: Alfred Romer; Ernest Edward Williams
- Author abbrev. (zoology): Gregory

William King Gregory (May 19, 1876 – December 29, 1970) was an American zoologist, primatologist, paleontologist, and functional and comparative anatomist. He was an expert on mammalian dentition, and a contributor to theories of evolution. He presented his ideas to students and the general public through books and museum exhibits.

== Early life ==
He was born in Greenwich Village, New York, on May 19, 1876 to George Gregory and Jane King Gregory. He attended Trinity School and then moved onto Columbia University in 1895, initially at the School of Mines but then transferring to Columbia College. He majored in zoology and vertebrate paleontology under Henry Fairfield Osborn. While still an undergraduate he became Osborn's research assistant and soon after married Laura Grace Foote. He received his undergraduate degree from Columbia in 1900, followed by a masters in 1905, and a doctorate in 1910.

== Academic career ==
He developed an early interest in both fishes and the land vertebrates, publishing papers on both groups, including two in Science in 1903. By 1911 he had expanded his interests to encompass amphibians with a paper on the limb structure of the Permian Eryops. Despite his heavy workload he served as editor of the American Museum Journal (which would later become Natural History). He was formally appointed to the scientific staff at the American Museum of Natural History in 1911 and became part of the teaching faculty at Columbia in 1916, eventually rising to the post of Da Costa Professor in the Department of Zoology. His notable students included Alfred Romer, James Chapin, C. L. Camp, and G. K. Noble. He was similarly successful at the museum, becoming full curator of three departments and serving as Chairman of two.

Although his work was wide-ranging the overriding focus was on comparative anatomy. His studies often had particular significance in the field of evolution; he believed the anatomical structures of fossil and extant species should exhibit relationships. His work charted the evolution from the early fishes through the various branches to birds and mammals, with numerous papers and two major works: Our Face from Fish to Man in 1929 and Evolution Emerging in 1951.

He developed the principle of habitus and heritage – theorizing that animals evolved with two sets of characteristics: the heritage features which derived from a long evolutionary history and the habitus characteristics which were adaptations to the environment in which the species existed. He later expanded this to his palimpsest theory which proposed that the habitus features often overlaid and obscured the heritage features. A similar theory, mosaic evolution, has appeared since King Gregory's death.

He studied lemurs and the insectivorous primates, as always concerning himself with evolutionary origins. From the 1920s he became involved in the study of marsupials, in 1947 developing his palimpsest theory by showing a connection between the monotremes and early reptiles. Around the early 1920s he also became interested in recent human evolution particularly after the discovery of the early African hominids. His specialist knowledge of mammalian dentition led him to pursue the same path with regard to human evolution and he came to be regarded as the world's leading expert on the evolution of human dentition, a reputation secured by the 1922 publication of The Evolution of the Human Dentition. However, he did initially think the hoax, Piltdown Man, likely to be genuine.

Gregory was elected to the America Philosophical Society in 1925 and the American Academy of Arts and Sciences in 1931.

== Later life ==
He retired from the American Museum of Natural History in 1944 and from Columbia in 1945, and moved permanently to his house in Woodstock, New York, with his second wife Angela, whom he had married soon after Laura's death in 1937. In 1949 he was awarded the Viking Fund Medal in 1949 for his contributions to physical anthropology. He died in the Woodstock house on December 29, 1970. He had been elected to the National Academy of Sciences in 1927 and on his death was one of the oldest members.
