= Taxonomy of Palaeosyops =

Taxonomy of a fossil mammal genus

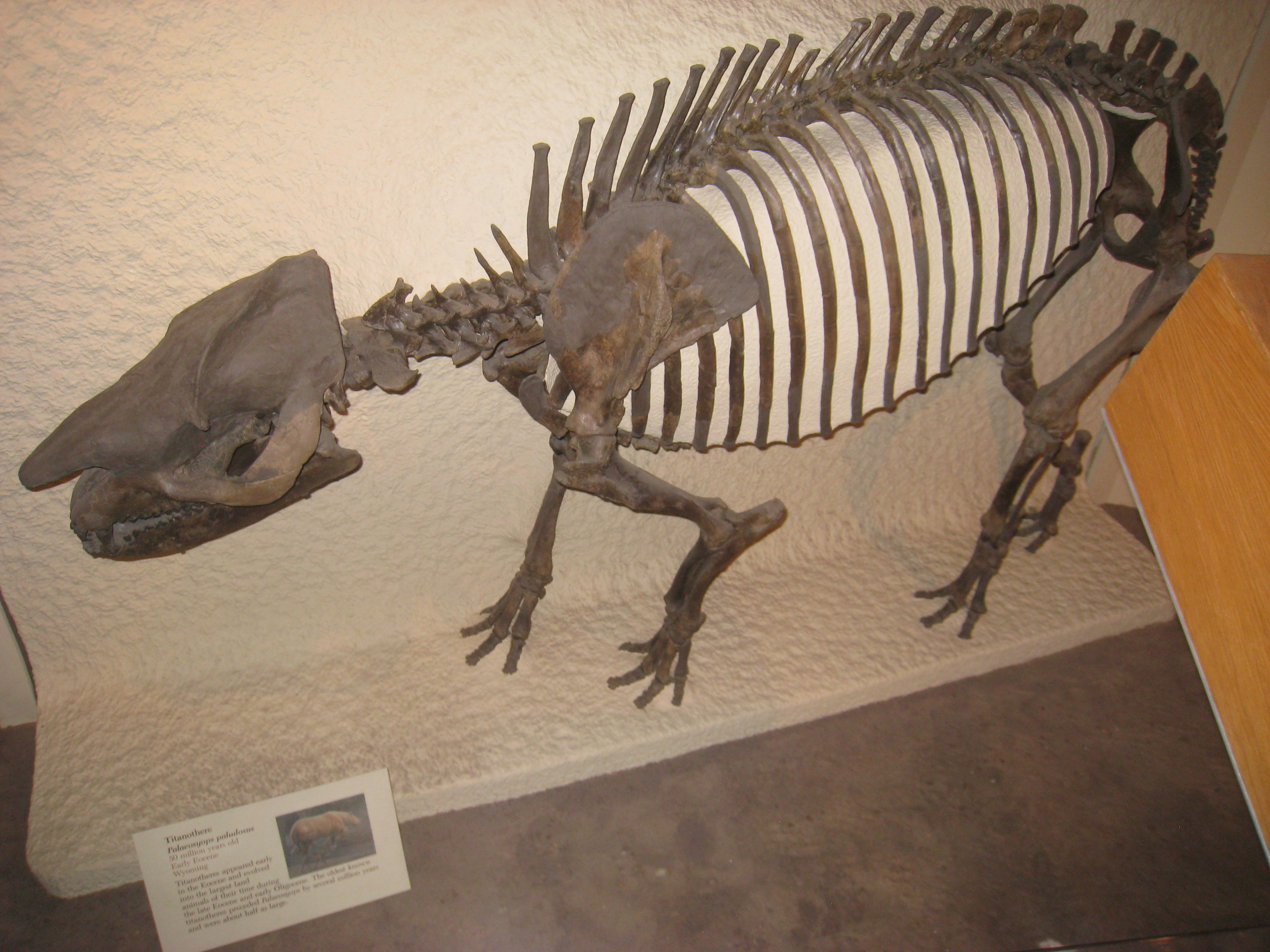
Mounted skeleton of P. paludosus at the National Museum of Natural History

The brontothere genus Palaeosyops, known from the Early Eocene of both North America and Asia, has a complex and extensive taxonomic history. Palaeosyops was one of the first brontothere genera to be named, by Joseph Leidy in 1870. Since Leidy's description of the type species P. paludosus, North American fossils now considered to belong to Palaeosyops have been referred to over twenty species, in several genera. In Asia, Palaeosyops is represented by the species P. dayi, originally named as a species of the related genus Eotitanops.

Modern revisions of the fossil material have recognized relatively few species as valid, but reassessments have not reached a consensus. The most recent revisions recognize three or five North American species of Palaeosyops as valid. The distinctions used to separate the species have also been questioned, and some have suggested that the North American fossils may represent only a single species.

Taxonomic issues are compounded by the lectotype specimen of P. paludosus, which is a probably non-diagnostic isolated tooth. P. paludosus and the genus Palaeosyops are generally maintained as valid, but may thus be nomina dubia, in which case the genus as currently understood would have to be treated under the next oldest available name, Limnohyus (currently considered a junior synonym).

== P. paludosus, and type specimens ==
Palaeosyops paludosus was described in 1870 by Joseph Leidy, based on four isolated teeth found at Church Buttes in the Bridger Formation of Wyoming. The teeth include three molars and one premolar (the four teeth are now catalogued as the three specimens USNM 758, 759, and 762), and were found by Ferdinand Vandeveer Hayden during his geological explorations of the Great Plains and the Rocky Mountains. Palaeosyops was the first hornless brontothere to be described, and one of the first brontothere genera to be described overall, just 24 years after the first brontothere fossils ("Menodus") were scientifically described. Leidy compared the teeth to Chalicotherium, Palaeotherium, and "Titanotherium", but failed to identify Palaeosyops as close to the (then fragmentarily known) brontotheres, partly because he erroneously believed brontotheres to be artiodactyls. Only in 1873 did Leidy realize that Palaeosyops was a perissodactyl, when he described a skull, teeth, and limb bones and noticed their resemblance to those of Palaeotherium and Tapirus.

The name Palaeosyops means "ancient boar face", derived from Ancient Greek παλαíο (ancient), σύς (boar), and ὤψ (face). Leidy gave no reason for the name. In 1929, Henry Fairfield Osborn interpreted the name as a reference to similarities Leidy noted between the molars of Palaeosyops and those of the anthracothere Hyopotamus (=Bothriodon). The species name paludosus means "marshy", or "dwelling in the marshes". Leidy gave no reason for the species name either; Osborn interpreted it as a possible reference to the Bridger Formation containing ancient lake basins.

In 1929, Osborn pointed out that the isolated teeth representing Leidy's syntypes may not necessarily all belong to the same individual. Osborn thus designated USNM 759, a second lower molar from the sample, as the lectotype of P. paludosus. USNM 759 is described first of the four teeth in Leidy's original description of the material. USNM 759 has generally been accepted as the valid lectotype since. Leidy's original teeth are of questionable diagnostic value. The lectotype being a lower molar is especially problematic, since lower molars in primitive brontotheres differ very little between species. As early as 1872, Othniel Charles Marsh remarked that the P. paludosus type material made it almost impossible to determine what fossils belonged to that species. The problematic type material has led to questions concerning the validity of P. paludosus, and thus also Palaeosyops as a genus, and has led some researchers to propose neotype specimens.

Osborn was the first to propose a neotype for P. paludosus, suggesting the well-preserved lower jaw AMNH 11680, from Millersville in the Bridger Formation. Osborn justified the jaw as a neotype by the "absolute similarity in form and size of the second inferior molar" to USNM 759. In 2000, Gregg F. Gunnell and Vicki L. Yarborough noted that they believe the lectotype tooth to be indeterminate, which would in turn make Palaeosyops a nomen dubium. To preserve the name, Gunnell and Yarborough proposed the UM 98890 as the neotype; this specimen includes a relatively well-preserved skull, jaw, and some postcranial elements. Gunnell and Yarborough noted that UM 98890 was found near Church Buttes, at the same stratigraphic interval as Leidy's original teeth, and that its second lower molar was the same size as USNM 759. Because the original lectotype is still available, neither proposed neotype holds any formal status or nomenclatural significance.

USNM 758, 759, 762
(Leidy's syntypes)

AMNH 11680
(Osborn's proposed neotype)

UM 98890 (skull; palatal view)
(Gunnell and Yarborough's proposed neotype)

Despite the probably nondiagnostic lectotype, Palaeosyops has been maintained as a valid genus in modern revisions. The validity of Palaeosyops has been supported by the lectotype being from the Blacks Fork Member of the Bridger Formation, which has only reliably yielded fossils of what appears to be a single valid brontothere taxon, for which Palaeosyops paludosus would be the oldest available name. Should Palaeosyops be deemed to be invalid, the next oldest available genus name corresponding to the genus as currently understood would by Limnohyus, named by Marsh in 1872.

== Descriptions of other species ==
=== Leidy's species ===
Leidy went on to describe three more species of Palaeosyops from the Bridger Formation, all based on fragmentary fossils. In 1871, Leidy named the new species Palaeosyops major, based on a jaw fragment from Grizzly Buttes, near Fort Bridger. Leidy noted that the jaw appeared more robust than jaws he had assigned to P. paludosus, which he used to justify the new taxon. Leidy also noted that the new jaw appeared to have been swollen and altered due to some disease the animal had in life. In 1929, Osborn proposed neotype specimens for P. major, consisting of a skull (AMNH 12182) and a jaw (AMNH 12181). Like Osborn's proposed neotype for P. paludosus, these fossils have no formal status or nomenclatural significance.

In 1872, Leidy named the species Palaeosyops humilis, based on a single upper molar from "Valley of Dry Creek 40 miles from Fort Bridger". The P. humilis tooth is small, and Leidy assumed that it may be a deciduous tooth. Later in 1872, Leidy named the species Palaeosyops junius, based on an isolated molar and an isolated premolar, from the vicinity of Fort Bridger. P. junius was transferred to the genus Mesatirhinus by Osborn in 1929.

ANSP 10421
Palaeosyops major type

Palaeosyops humilis type

ANSP 10349 and ANSP 10348
Palaeosyops junius (=Mesatirhinus) syntypes

=== Marsh's species ===
Othniel Charles Marsh named the new species Palaeosyops minor in 1871, based on a single isolated molar from Grizzly Buttes. Marsh noted that the tooth was similar to Leidy's Palaeosyops paludosus, which had been found in the same deposits, but that it was less than half the size of the corresponding teeth assigned to that species. Marsh did not figure the P. minor tooth. In 1929, Osborn did not believe Marsh's P. minor to belong to Palaeosyops, or a brontothere at all. Instead, Osborn referred it to Tillodontia, as "Anchippodus minor". In 2010, Mader contended that Marsh may have been correct in his original assessment that the tooth belonged to Palaeosyops, though Mader did not personally examine the tooth.

In 1872, Marsh described a first lower premolar, later identified as another Palaeosyops fossil, from Grizzly Buttes. The tooth was associated with fragmentary skull and postcranial material, but Marsh did not recognize the tooth as belonging to Palaeosyops, or to a perissodactyl at all. Due to the tooth's deceptive resemblance to the premolar of a dog, Marsh described the tooth as belonging to a new species in the genus Canis, Canis montanus. The name Canis montanus is preoccupied by Canis montanus (Pearson, 1836), a synonym of the extant hill fox. In 1899, Oliver Perry Hay erected the replacement name Canis marshii for Marsh's "Canis montanus".

Marsh named two more species in 1872, Palaeosyops laticeps and Limnohyus robustus. P. laticeps was based on a nearly complete skeleton found "near Marsh's Fork, about 15 miles from Fort Bridger". Marsh compared P. laticeps to Leidy's P. paludosus teeth, and noted that the P. laticeps skeleton, which belonged to an adult individual, appeared to be smaller, and that its teeth were much smoother than those of P. paludosus. Limnohyus robustus was based on several fossils, with a fragmentary skull selected as the type specimen. Marsh believed that two genera of primitive brontotheres were represented in the Bridger Formation, one with a hypocone (one of the cusps) on the third molar and one without it, and applied the name Palaeosyops to animals with a hypocone, and his new genus Limnohyus to those that lacked the hypocone. The name Limnohyus means "marshy boar" or "shore boar", derived from Ancient Greek Λíμνη (a marshy lake, or shore) and σύς (boar).

In 1872, Leidy pointed out that the original molars he had referred to P. paludosus included a third molar without a hypocone, and that Marsh could thus not use that trait to define Limnohyus. Limnohyus was thus recognized as a junior synonym of Palaeosyops. In 1890, Marsh used to same logic to instead move P. laticeps to a new genus, Limnohyops, which was distinguished from Palaeosyops by the presence of the hypocone. Limnohyops means "marshy boar face" or "shore boar face", adding the suffix ὤψ (face) to Limnohyus.

YPM 11000
Palaeosyops laticeps type (skull)

YPM 11000
Palaeosyops laticeps type (maxilla and tooth series)

YPM 11122
Limnohyus robustus type (tooth series)

YPM 11122
Limnohyus robustus type (frontals)

=== Cope's species ===
In 1872 and 1873, Edward Drinker Cope described four new species of Palaeosyops and Limnohyus: P. vallidens, L. laevidens, L. fontinalis, and P. diaconus. P. vallidens was based on several fossils from the Washakie Basin, including a partial lower jaw and isolated teeth. Cope distinguished P. vallidens by its large size, larger than Leidy's P. major, and the presence of strong transverse ridges on molars and premolars. L. laevidens was based on several fossils from the Bridger Basin, including a relatively well-preserved skull. Cope identified L. laevidens as a larger form. Cope considered the molars of L. laevidens to be similar to those of L. robustus, but differing in that the second superior molar had only one outer tubercle, and that the cingula of L. laevidens were much less developed than in L. robustus. L. fontinalis was based on the fragmentary skull of a young individual, found "on a bluff on Green River, near the mouth of the Big Sandy, Wyoming"; Cope found the characteristics of its last superior molar to be similar to P. paludosus. P. diaconus was based on a partial maxilla from "Henrys Fork of Green River, Wyoming". Cope described P. diaconus as of the same size as P. major, but differing in the proportions of the teeth.

Cope described a fifth species in 1880, Palaeosyops borealis, based on a maxilla fragment from the Wind River Basin in Wyoming. P. borealis was transferred to the new genus Eotitanops by Osborn in 1907. Osborn distinguished this genus from Palaeosyops mainly by its more elongated skull.

AMNH 5098
Palaeosyops vallidens type (lower jaw)

AMNH 5104
Limnohyus laevidens type (skull)

AMNH 5107
Limnohyus fontinalis type (partial skull)

AMNH 5106
Palaeosyops diaconus type (maxilla)

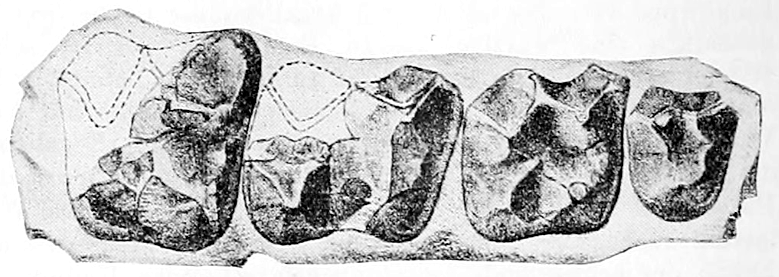
AMNH 4892
Palaeosyops borealis (=Eotitanops) type (maxilla)

=== Osborn's species ===
In 1889, Osborn named the new species Palaeosyops hyognathus, based on a mandible from the Washakie Basin. In 1929, Osborn transferred this species to the genus Dolichorhinus.

In a 1908 study on brontotheres, Osborn named three new species of Limnohyops, from the Lower Bridger Formation, and three new species of Palaeosyops, from the Upper Bridger and Lower Washakie formations. Osborn named L. priscus, L. matthewi, and L. monoconus based on three skulls from Grizzly Buttes, all found by an expedition in 1903. L. priscus, based on a crushed skull with well-preserved dentition, was distinguished from the contemporary L. laevidens by its larger size and the "more progressive character" of the second and third premolars. L. matthewi, based on a skull lacking much of its anterior portion, was noted as being intermediate in size between L. laevidens and L. monoconus. L. monoconus, based on another crushed skull, was distinguished by the "exceptional condition" of having only a single cone on the inner side of its third superior molar. Palaeosyops leidyi was based on a well-preserved skull found at Henry's Fork, in the Bridger Basin, in 1893. Osborn noted that this was a relatively large species, which had "long been confused with Palaeosyops major and Palaeosyops paludosus". Palaeosyops grangeri was based on a palate, with some preserved portions of the skull and jaws, and was distinguished from P. robustus by certain dental proportions. Palaeosyops copei was based on a series of superior grinding teeth from Lone Tree, Henry's Fork, and was noted to showcase the "most progressive" species of Palaeosyops in terms of its dental characteristics.

In 1919, Osborn named the new genus and species Eometarhinus huerfanensis based on a partial skull from the Huerfano Formation in Colorado. Osborn considered Eometarhinus to be "widely distinct" from the contemporary P. fontinalis in all of its characteristics, and interpreted the animal as ancestral to the later Metarhinus, hence the name Eometarhinus ("dawn Metarhinus").

YPM PU10273
Palaeosyops hyognathus (=Dolichorhinus) type (mandible)

AMNH 11687
Dentition of Limnohyops priscus type

AMNH 11684
Limnohyops matthewi type (partial skull)

AMNH 11679
Limnohyops monoconus type (skull)

AMNH 1544
Palaeosyops leidyi type (skull)

AMNH 12189
Dentition of Palaeosyops grangeri type

AMNH 11708
Palaeosyops copei type (tooth series)

AMNH 17412
Eometarhinus huerfanensis type (skull)

=== Species named by others ===
In 1891–1892, Charles Earle named three new species of Palaeosyops. Palaeosyops megarhinus was based on a well-preserved skull from the Washakie Basin, which Earle recognized as similar to Palaeosyops paludosus, yet quite distinct. In 1908, P. megarhinus was reclassified to the genus Mesatirhinus by Osborn. Earle based the new species Palaeosyops minor on fossils Leidy had referred to Palaeosyops paludosus, apparently selecting a tooth series as the type specimen. Earle's P. minor is a junior homonym of Marsh's 1871 P. minor, and is thus an invalid name; in any case, later authors have agreed with Leidy's original assessment that the fossils are P. paludosus. Earle's third species, Palaeosyops longirostris, was based on a mandible previously described by Leidy. Earle distinguished P. longirostris from other species by the great extension of the jaw behind the last molar, which Earle interpreted as a unique feature, alongside other minor features of the mandible and teeth.

Citing unpublished manuscripts by Osborn, William Diller Matthew used the technically new names Palaeosyops ultimus and Palaeosyops manteoceras, in 1897 and 1899, respectively. Because Matthew did not specify type specimens or provide diagnoses for either name, both of these names remained nomina nuda until properly diagnosed later; P. ultimus was described as Telmatherium ultimus by Osborn in 1908, and P. manteoceras was described as Manteoceras manteoceras by Oliver Perry Hay in 1902.

In 1958, Richard Dehm and Therese zu Oettingen-Spielberg described fragmentary brontothere fossils from the Kuldana Formation of Pakistan. Dehm and Oettingen-Spielberg noted that the material was similar to Palaeosyops, but referred it to a new species of Eotitanops, E. dayi, based mostly on slight differences in the length-width ratio of the third molar.

YPM PU10008
Palaeosyops megarhinus (=Mesatirhinus) type (skull)

Earle's "Palaeosyops minor" type (tooth series)

YPM PU10275
Palaeosyops longirostris type (mandible)

== Revisions ==
=== 20th century ===
Henry Fairfield Osborn's illustration of skulls characteristic of Palaeosyops and "Limnohyops"

The taxonomy of North American Palaeosyops has been subject to several revisions since the early 20th century. In 1929, Osborn recognized 14 species as valid, classified in the three genera Eometarhinus, Limnohyops, and Palaeosyops. These species included eight species of Palaeosyops (P. copei, P. grangeri, P. fontinalis, P. leidyi, P. longirostris, P. major, P. paludosus, P. robustus), five species of Limnohyops (L. laticeps, L. laevidens, L. matthewi, L. monoconus, L. priscus), and one species of Eometarhinus (E. huerfanensis). Osborn listed a number of characters that he believed distinguished Palaeosyops and Limnohyops on the generic level, though most of these differences are relatively trivial. Osborn noted that the total differences between the two genera appeared less than between different modern species of Cervus, but believed that they likely differed in life in their external appearance, color, and habits.

Osborn generally retained the chief generic distinction originally used by Marsh; the name Limnohyops was used for species with a hypocone on the third molar, and Palaeosyops was used for those without one. Nevertheless, Osborn recognized one species of Limnohyops that lacked a hypocone (L. laticeps). The most obvious feature used by Osborn to separate the two genera was the overall robusticity of the skulls. Some skulls are more robust, and have wide sagittal crests, whereas others are more gracile, with thinner sagittal crests. Osborn referred the more gracile skulls to Limnohyops. Some of the characters that Osborn used to distinguish the two genera are entirely erroneous. As an example, Osborn asserted that Limnohyops did not have a frontoparietal convexity or dome, otherwise observed in Palaeosyops skulls, but none of the skulls referred to Limnohyops by Osborn preserve the relevant part of the skull in good enough condition to tell.

In 1966, Peter Robinson designated Eometarhinus huerfanensis as a junior synonym of Palaeosyops fontinalis. Robinson found Osborn's reconstruction of the skull to be misleading, for instance showing a speculative orientation of the nasals that would be distinct from skulls of species such as Limnohyops laevidens and Palaeosyops fontinalis. Osborn had mentioned the presence of "horn bosses" in Eometarhinus, but Robinson found that this was a misinterpretation of the nasofrontal suture of the type specimen. Robinson further speculated that future studies may reduce the number of palaeosyopine species, and perhaps the number of genera.

In 1989, Mader published a genus-level revision of North American brontotheres. Mader designated both Eometarhinus and Limnohyops as synonyms of Palaeosyops. Mader deemed the differences between skulls with and without hypocones to be too small to justify separating them at the genus level, and that most of Osborn's genus-level differences between Palaeosyops and Limnohyops were most likely due to individual variation or due to the preservation of the fossils. The robusticity of the skulls was interpreted by Mader as most likely due to sexual dimorphism. Mader noted that the fossils of Eometarhinus were very fragmentary and thus difficult to properly compare to other fossils, but that Robinson was most likely correct in his synonymization with P. fontinalis. Mader supported Osborn's assessment that Eotitanops was generically distinct from Palaeosyops, noting that while known Eotitanops fossils were fragmentary, they appeared to indicate an animal with a less robust and more dolichocephalic (elongated) skull.

In Malcolm McKenna and Susan K. Bell's 1997 Classification of Mammals: Above the Species Level, only Palaeosyops was recognized as a valid genus, with Eotitanops, Eometarhinus, and Limnohyops listed as junior synonyms. In 1998, Mader maintained the distinction of Palaeosyops and Eotitanops, and that Limnohyops and Eometarhinus were synonyms of Palaeosyops. Mader recognized only three valid species of Palaeosyops: P. paludosus, P. fontinalis, and P. robustus, with the others designated as synonyms.

=== 21st century ===
In 2000, Gregg F. Gunnell and Vicki L. Yarborough published a new species-level revision of the Bridgerian brontotheres of North America. Gunnell and Yarborough recognized the generic distinction between Eotitanops and Palaeosyops, and the synonymy of Eometarhinus and Limnohyops with Palaeosyops. Gunnell and Yarborough recognized five species of Palaeosyops as valid: P. laticeps, P. laevidens, P. fontinalis, P. paludosus, and P. robustus. Their five-species model was based mainly on variations in dentition and size, as well as the stratigraphic level of the fossils. According to this interpretation, the earliest Bridgerian species P. fontinalis was succeeded in the middle Bridgerian by the larger P. laevidens and P. paludosus, which in turn were succeeded in the late Bridgerian by P. laticeps and P. robustus. Gunnell and Yarborough designated Palaeosyops junius as a synonym of P. paludosus; Osborn had moved this species to Mesatirhinus, and Mader had designated it as a nomen dubium that may be synonymous with Mesatirhinus megarhinus.

In 2008, Matthew C. Mihlbachler revised most brontothere taxa as part of a major monograph. Mihlbachler excluded the basal genera Eotitanops and Palaeosyops, since they had been recently revised by Gunnell and Yarborough, and had been included in previous general analyses of the phylogeny of perissodactyls. Despite this, Mihlbachler opinioned that the species-level taxonomy of Palaeosyops remained in need of revision, noting that Mader had not provided diagnoses for his three-species model in 1998, and that the characters used by Gunnell and Yarborough in 2000 to split species (dental variation, size differences) were not reliable distinguishing features in brontotheres. Mihlbachler disagreed with Gunnell and Yarborough on the synonymy of P. junius and P. paludosus, and instead classified P. junius as Mesatirhinus. In Mihlbachler's opinion, the North American fossils referred to Palaeosyops may not be subdividable into distinct species under a phylogenetic species concept due to overlap in features between specimens, but he noted that there appears to have been an evolutionary trend of increasing robusticity and size.

In 2010, Mader published his own species-level revision of Palaeosyops and Eotitanops. Mader did not find the dental variations observed by Gunnell and Yarborough to be compelling as species-level distinctions, and instead recognized just a single species from each stratigraphic level: P. fontinalis (Bridger A, i.e. earliest), P. paludosus (Bridger B), and P. robustus (Bridger C). In terms of anatomy, the three species as proposed by Mader are diagnosed only by their relative size, with P. fontinalis as the smallest species and P. robustus as the largest. Mader noted that P. fontinalis might also be distinguishable by "the more plesiomorphic structure of P2 and relatively small fronto-parietal dome." On the fossils from the Huerfano Formation (the former Eometarhinus huerfanensis), similar in age to Bridger A, Mader again noted that the fossils are so fragmentary that synonymization with P. fontinalis is provisional, and that more complete specimens might establish the Huerfano species as a distinct species (P. huerfanensis). Mader did not find convincing morphological differences to distinguish P. paludosus and P. laevidens from Bridger B, and thus designated P. laevidens as a synonym of P. paludosus. He further noted that should the evidence point to more than one species from this level, it might be difficult to determine which fossils are P. paludosus due to the poor type specimen. Gunnell and Yarborough distinguished the Bridger C species P. robustus and P. laticeps by the smaller size of P. laticeps, and distinct hypocones on its third molar. Mader regarded them as synonymous, arguing that "the distal part of the brontothere tooth row is highly variable and the size and morphology of the M3 hypocone generally makes a poor diagnostic character."

In 2011, Pieter Missiaen, Gunnell, and Philip D. Gingerich reclassified the Pakistani species Eotitanops dayi as Palaeosyops dayi. Missiaen, Gunnell, and Gingerich noted that new fossil discoveries since the description of E. dayi in 1958 had provided more information for distinguishing Palaeosyops and Eotitanops. The authors concluded that many of the features used by Dehm and Oettingen-Spielberg to classify E. dayi as Eotitanops had since been determined to be of little use in distinguishing Eotitanops and Palaeosyops, citing both Gunnell and Yarborough's 2000 study and Mader's 2010 study (though continued to use the 2000 taxonomy for Palaeosyops). Based on the generic characteristics found in both studies, the dental features of E. dayi instead appeared to most closely match Palaeosyops. These features included E. dayi's fourth premolars with distinct protocones and talon shelfs, and distinct cingula, tall and well-separated upper molar hypocones and protocones, and the large and basined hypoconulid lobe of the third molar.

In a study on brontothere size in 2023, Oscar Sanisidro, Mihlbachler, and Juan L. Cantalapiedra treated all North American Palaeosyops species as a single species, though they did not formally revise the genus. Sanisidro, Mihlbachler, and Cantalapiedra noted that Gunnell and Yarborough's five-species model was mainly based on size differences, and that each of their proposed species was restricted to one subunit of the Bridgerian land mammal age. Much of the proposed intraspecific variation according to Gunnell and Yarborough could according to Sanisidro, Mihlbachler, and Cantalapiedra be explained as individual variation within a single species.

== Table of taxonomic names ==
Valid taxon
Synonym
Nondiagnostic/indeterminate
Not treated

Taxon	Authority	Osborn (1929)	Gunnell & Yarborough (2000)	Mader (2010)	Notes
Palaeosyops paludosus	Leidy, 1870	Palaeosyops paludosus	Palaeosyops paludosus	Palaeosyops paludosus	
Palaeosyops major	Leidy, 1871	Palaeosyops major	=Palaeosyops paludosus	=Palaeosyops paludosus	
Palaeosyops minor	Marsh, 1871	Not a brontothere	Not mentioned	=Palaeosyops paludosus	Belongs to Tillodontia (as Anchippodus minor) according to Osborn, 1929.
Canis montanus	Marsh, 1872	Preoccupied and indeterminate Possibly =P. paludosus or =P. major	=Palaeosyops paludosus	=Palaeosyops paludosus	Preoccupied by Canis montanus (Pearson, 1836). Moved to C. marshii by Hay, 1899.
Palaeosyops laticeps (Limnohyops laticeps)	Marsh, 1872	Limnohyops laticeps	Palaeosyops laticeps	=Palaeosyops robustus	Moved to genus Limnohyops by Marsh, 1890
Limnohyus robustus	Marsh, 1872	Palaeosyops robustus	Palaeosyops robustus	Palaeosyops robustus	
Palaeosyops humilis	Leidy, 1872	=Palaeosyops major	=Palaeosyops robustus	=Palaeosyops paludosus	
Palaeosyops junius	Leidy, 1872	Mesatirhinus junius	=Palaeosyops paludosus	Not mentioned	Moved to the (valid) genus Mesatirhinus by Osborn, 1929
Palaeosyops vallidens	Cope, 1872	Dolichorhinus vallidens	Not mentioned	Not mentioned	Moved to the (valid) genus Dolichorhinus by Osborn, 1929. Considered dubious, possibly Dolichorhinus or Telmatherium.
Limnohyus laevidens	Cope, 1873	Limnohyops laevidens	Palaeosyops laevidens	=Palaeosyops paludosus	
Limnohyus fontinalis	Cope, 1873	Palaeosyops fontinalis	Palaeosyops fontinalis	Palaeosyops fontinalis	
Palaeosyops diaconus	Cope, 1873	=Palaeosyops robustus	=Palaeosyops robustus	=Palaeosyops robustus	
Palaeosyops borealis	Cope, 1880	Eotitanops borealis	Eotitanops borealis	Eotitanops borealis	Moved to the (valid) genus Eotitanops by Osborn, 1907
Palaeosyops hyognathus	Osborn, 1889	Dolichorhinus hyognathus	Not mentioned	Not mentioned	Moved to the (valid) genus Dolichorhinus by Osborn, 1929
Palaeosyops megarhinus	Earle, 1891	Mesatirhinus megarhinus	Not mentioned	Not mentioned	Moved to the (valid) genus Mesatirhinus by Osborn, 1908. Considered a synonym of M. junius.
Palaeosyops minor	Earle, 1891	=Palaeosyops paludosus	=Palaeosyops paludosus	Invalid name	Junior homonym of P. minor Marsh, 1891
Palaeosyops longirostris	Earle, 1892	Palaeosyops longirostris	=Palaeosyops paludosus	=Palaeosyops paludosus	
Palaeosyops ultimus	Matthew, 1897	Nomen nudum	Not mentioned	Not mentioned	Validly named as a species of Telmatherium by Osborn, 1908. Moved to the (valid) genus Metatelmatherium by Granger & Gregory, 1943.
Palaeosyops manteoceras	Matthew, 1899	Nomen nudum	Not mentioned	Not mentioned	Validly named as a species of Manteoceras by Hay, 1902. Considered a synonym of Telmatherium validus.
Canis marshii	Hay, 1899	Indeterminate; Possibly =P. paludosus or =P. major	=Palaeosyops paludosus	Not mentioned	Replacement name for Canis montanus
Limnohyops priscus	Osborn, 1908	Limnohyops priscus	=Palaeosyops laevidens	=Palaeosyops paludosus	
Limnohyops matthewi	Osborn, 1908	Limnohyops matthewi	=Palaeosyops paludosus	=Palaeosyops paludosus	
Limnohyops monoconus	Osborn, 1908	Limnohyops monoconus	=Palaeosyops laevidens	=Palaeosyops paludosus	
Palaeosyops leidyi	Osborn, 1908	Palaeosyops leidyi	=Palaeosyops robustus	=Palaeosyops robustus	
Palaeosyops grangeri	Osborn, 1908	Palaeosyops grangeri	=Palaeosyops robustus	=Palaeosyops robustus	
Palaeosyops copei	Osborn, 1908	Palaeosyops copei	=Palaeosyops robustus	=Palaeosyops robustus	
Eometarhinus huerfanensis	Osborn, 1919	Eometarhinus huerfanensis	=Palaeosyops fontinalis	=Palaeosyops fontinalis	
Eotitanops dayi	Dehm & Oettingen-Spielberg, 1958	Not mentioned	Not mentioned	Not mentioned	
