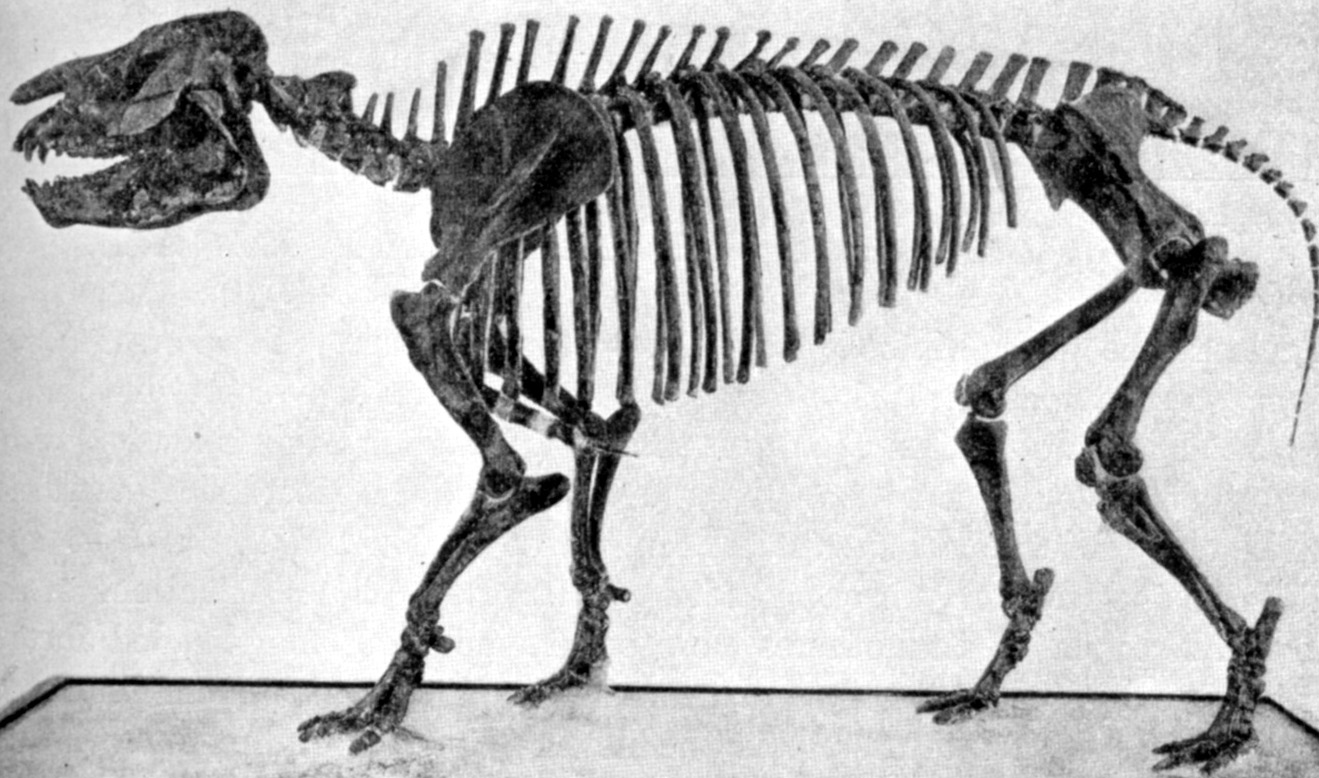
- 1920s photograph of a mounted P. robustus skeleton on display at the American Museum of Natural History

Scientific classification
- Kingdom: Animalia
- Phylum: Chordata
- Class: Mammalia
- Order: Perissodactyla
- Family: †Brontotheriidae
- Subfamily: †Palaeosyopinae; Steinmann & Döderlein, 1890
- Genus: †Palaeosyops; Leidy, 1870

Type species
- †Palaeosyops paludosus Leidy, 1870

Other species
- †P. dayi (Dehm & Oettingen-Spielberg, 1958); Species pending reassessment: †P. fontinalis (Cope, 1873); †P. laevidens (Cope, 1873); †P. laticeps (Marsh, 1872); †P. robustus (Marsh, 1872)

Synonyms
- Genus synonymy: Eometarhinus Osborn, 1919; Limnohyops Marsh, 1890; Limnohyus Marsh, 1872; Species-level synonymy: See taxonomy of Palaeosyops

= Palaeosyops =

Palaeosyops Temporal range: Early–Middle Eocene, 50.1–46.3 Ma Possible late Middle Eocene record

Extinct genus of mammals

Palaeosyops (lit. 'ancient boar face') is an extinct genus of primitive brontothere that lived in Asia and North America during the Early to Middle Eocene. Palaeosyops was among the first brontotheres to be described scientifically, and is known from a large number of fossils, particularly from the Bridger Formation in the Green River Basin in the western United States.

The largest Palaeosyops were about the size of small cattle, exceeding 400 kilograms (880 lb) in weight. Palaeosyops was the largest mammal in its environment, and markedly larger in size than its ancestors and the more basal brontothere Eotitanops. Palaeosyops had a relatively robust skull, and is unique among the brontotheres for its quite extreme brachycephaly (a short and broad head). Gracile Palaeosyops skulls were once classified as the separate genus Limnohyops, but are now interpreted as showing sexually dimorphic differences. The dentition, overall anatomy, and inferred paleoenvironment (semitropical forests) of Palaeosyops all indicate that it had a diet and lifestyle similar to modern-day tapirs, though unlike tapirs Palaeosyops did not have a prehensile upper lip.

The species-level taxonomy of Palaeosyops is disputed. North American fossils show a general trend of increasing size and robusticity over the course of the Bridgerian. This has been interpreted as a succession of species, from P. fontinalis to P. paludosus to P. robustus. Different revisions have recognized additional or fewer species, and some scholars contend that the North American fossils may not be divisible into distinct species at all. In Asia, fragmentary fossils from Pakistan have been referred to the species P. dayi. Additional fragmentary fossils referred to Palaeosyops are also known from Kazakhstan and Myanmar, and from the Arctic Ellesmere Island in Canada.

== Research history ==
=== North America ===
Joseph Leidy's original type fossils of P. paludosus

Skeletal reconstruction of P. paludosus

Palaeosyops paludosus was one of the first brontotheres to be scientifically described, and one of the first mammals described from the fossil-rich Eocene deposits of the Green River Basin in Wyoming. Palaeosyops was the first hornless brontothere to be discovered, and its relation to the brontotheres previously discovered, such as the considerably more massive Megacerops, was not realized for some time. The first Palaeosyops fossils to be described consisted of four isolated teeth found at Church Buttes in the Bridger Formation of Wyoming, found by Ferdinand Vandeveer Hayden during his geological explorations of the Great Plains and the Rocky Mountains. The teeth were described by Joseph Leidy in 1870; the name Palaeosyops, for which Leidy provided no explanation, means "ancient boar face", derived from Ancient Greek παλαíο (ancient), σύς (boar), and ὤψ (face). Leidy did not recognize Palaeosyops as a perissodactyl until 1873, when he described a skull, teeth, and limb bones and noticed their resemblance to those of Palaeotherium and Tapirus.

Over the course of the late 19th and early 20th century, a large number of fossils of primitive brontotheres from the Bridgerian of North America were discovered, and used to name a multitude of species and several genera. Much of the fossil material was found in the Bridger Formation in the Green River Basin. In 1929, Henry Fairfield Osborn recognized fourteen distinct species, divided into the three genera Palaeosyops, Limnohyops, and Eometarhinus. In addition to relatively minor dental and cranial features, the best represented genera Palaeosyops and Limnohyops were distinguished mainly by their robusticity, with the name Limnohyops used for more gracile specimens. Given that the type material of the Palaeosyops type species, P. paludosus, consists of isolated teeth, concerns have been raised that the species may be non-diagnostic, and that the genus might thus be dubious. Some neotype specimens have been suggested by different authors, but these specimens have no nomenclatural significance since the original teeth are still available. Despite the problematic type fossils, recent revisions of brontotheres have continued to use the name Palaeosyops.

In 1966, Peter Robinson synonymized Eometarhinus, used for fossils known from the Huerfano Formation, with Palaeosyops. Later revisions have maintained that Eometarhinus is a junior synonym of Palaeosyops, though it has been noted that the Eometarhinus fossils are so fragmentary that it may not be entirely possible to confidently rule it out as distinct. Limnohyops was designated a junior synonym of Palaeosyops by Bryn J. Mader in 1989, who attributed supposed generic distinctions to individual variation and sexual dimorphism. This synonymy has likewise been maintained in later revisions. In a 2000 species-level revision, Gregg F. Gunnell and Vicki L. Yarborough recognized five species of Palaeosyops: P. fontinalis from the early Bridgerian, P. laevidens and P. paludosus from the middle Bridgerian, and P. laticeps and P. robustus from the late Bridgerian. Under this model, the species are differentiated mainly by size and various dental features. In 2010, Mader published his own species-level revision, which recognized only three species: P. fontinalis from the early Bridgerian, P. paludosus from the middle Bridgerian, and P. robustus from the late Bridgerian. Mader did not consider the dental features used by Gunnell and Yarborough to be diagnostically useful, and distinguished the species mainly by their size and stratigraphic level.

Underside of a P. robustus skull

In 2008, Matthew C. Mihlbachler doubted multi-species classification schemes for Palaeosyops, since size differences and dental features are not reliable diagnostic traits in brontotheres. Although Mihlbachler noted that there appeared to be a general trend of increasing size and robusticity over the course of the Bridgerian, he opinioned that Palaeosyops may not be divisible into several distinct species under a phylogenetic species concept due to overlap in features between specimens. In 2023, Oscar Sanisidro, Mihlbachler, and Juan L. Cantalapiedra suggested that any observed anatomical differences between Palaeosyops species could be explainable as individual variation within a single species.

In 2015, fragmentary brontothere fossils from the Bridgerian of the Margaret Formation of the Eureka Sound Group, on Ellesmere Island in northern Canada, were referred to Palaeosyops sp. by Jaelyn Eberle and David Eberth. These fossils included jaw fragments, isolated teeth, and an incomplete astragalus.

=== Asia ===
In addition to the large number of Palaeosyops fossils known from North America, a number of fragmentary fossils from Asia have also been referred to the genus. In 1958, Richard Dehm and Therese zu Oettingen-Spielberg described fragmentary brontothere fossils, including maxillae and tooth fragments, from the Kuldana Formation of Pakistan. Dehm and Oettingen-Spielberg identified the fossils as those of a primitive brontothere, and noted similarities to Palaeosyops, but referred the fossils to a new species of the related Eotitanops, E. dayi, based mostly on slight differences in the length-width ratio of the third molar. In 2011, Pieter Missiaen, Gunnell, and Philip D. Gingerich reclassified E. dayi as Palaeosyops dayi. Missiaen, Gunnell, and Gingerich noted that P. dayi appeared intermediate in size between Eotitanops and other species of Palaeosyops, that dental features previously used to place it in Eotitanops were no longer considered diagnostically useful, and that the teeth resembled those of Palaeosyops more than those of Eotitanops.

In 1977, Leo Gabunia described a right first or second molar from the Aksyr River in the Zaysan Basin, Kazakhstan, and referred the tooth to Palaeosyops sp. In 2008, Mihlbachler agreed that the tooth came from a primitive brontothere, similar to Palaeosyops or Eotitanops, but that it did not have enough character data to properly identify. Gabunia's tooth is from an animal smaller than any North American species of Palaeosyops, but Mihlbachler noted that it could plausibly represent an Asian species of the genus or a similar brontothere. In 2000, Patricia A. Holroyd and Russell Ciochon described the new primitive brontothere genus and species Bunobrontops savagei from the Pondaung Formation of Myanmar. In addition to the fossils referred to B. savagei, Holroyd and Ciochon also referred two right molar fragments (AMNH 32523a and AMNH 32523b) to Bunobrontops sp. In 2008, Mihlbachler instead referred the two molar fragments to cf. Palaeosyops sp., noting that they were more similar to Palaeosyops molars in their proportions and wear patterns than to those of B. savagei.

== Description ==
Life restoration of P. robustus

Palaeosyops was a medium-sized brontothere, and was a considerably larger animal than the more primitive brontotheres that preceded it (Eotitanops). The largest Palaeosyops grew to be 1.5 to 2 metres (4.9–6.6 ft) long. Osborn estimated P. leidyi (a synonym of P. robustus) to have stood 101 centimetres (3.31 ft) tall at the shoulder. In 2023, Oscar Sanisidro, Mihlbachler, and Juan L. Cantalapiedra estimated the body mass of Palaeosyops at 408.5 kilograms (901 lb).

As a more massive and robust animal than its predecessors, the skeleton of Palaeosyops was more graviportal (adapted to be more weight-bearing), foreshadowing the more massive brontotheres that would evolve after its time. Palaeosyops is thought to have had a lumbering gait, indicated by its spreading feet.

=== Skull and dentition ===
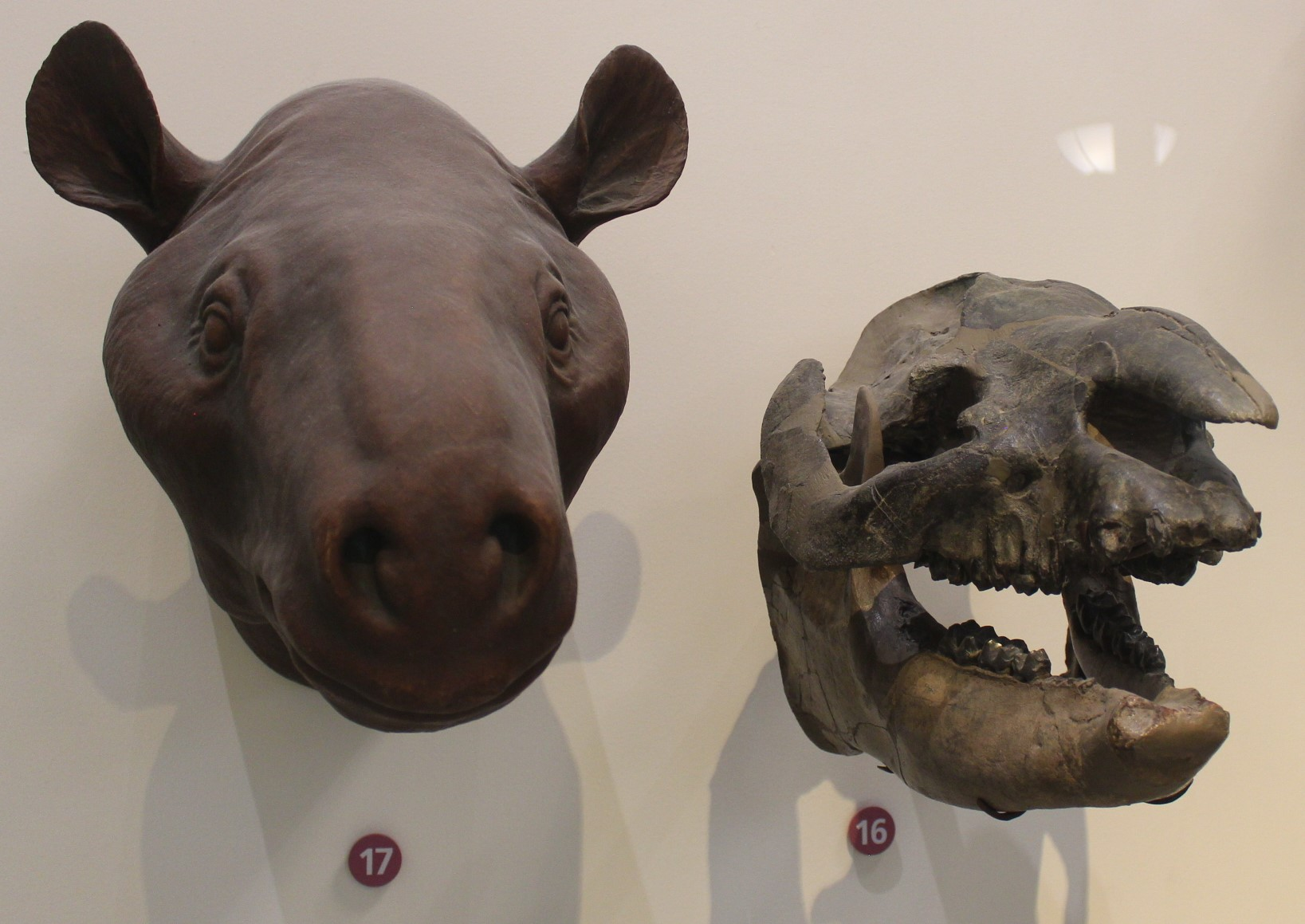
Skull and reconstructed head of P. robustus at the American Museum of Natural History

Palaeosyops had a robust skull, and is noted for its relative extreme brachycephaly (short and broad head) compared to other brontotheres. The strongly brachycephalic skull, and robust and sharply curved zygomatic arches, are synapomorphies that distinguish Palaeosyops from all other brontotheres. The brachycephaly of Palaeosyops also distinguishes it from more primitive perissodactyls, whereas the more primitive Eotitanops is noted for greater cranial and dental similarities to primitive equids and palaeotheres. Additional synapomorphies that distinguish Palaeosyops from other brontotheres include its sharply curved and distally tapering nasals, and the presence of a dome or low convexity in the region of the frontoparietal border.

Palaeosyops had the dental formula 3.1.4.33.1.4.3. The canines of Palaeosyops were large, and more prominent than in other brontotheres. The other incisors were also large and caniniform (canine-like). There was either a very small upper diastema (gap between teeth; in this case between the canine and premolars), or no upper diastema at all, and a moderately sized lower diastema. The premolars were not molarized (not molar-like), the molars had large paraconules, and the third molar sometimes had a hypocone or pseudohypocone.

The skull of Palaeosyops had a thin sagittal crest, and large areas of attachment for the masseter and temporal muscles. In combination with the robust zygomatic arches, and a deep and heavy lower jaw, these features sugggest great vertical movements of the jaw, and that Palaeosyops used great power when crushing food. The large canines may have been used for rooting around on the forest floor. Palaeosyops is believed to have had a diet similar to modern-day tapirs; it was likely well adapted to feed on tubers, roots, and bulbs from the ground, as well as for browsing on vegetation such as leaves or twigs. Unlike tapirs, the nasals of Palaeosyops were not retracted, and there is no evidence that it had a trunk or prehensile upper lip.

== Classification ==
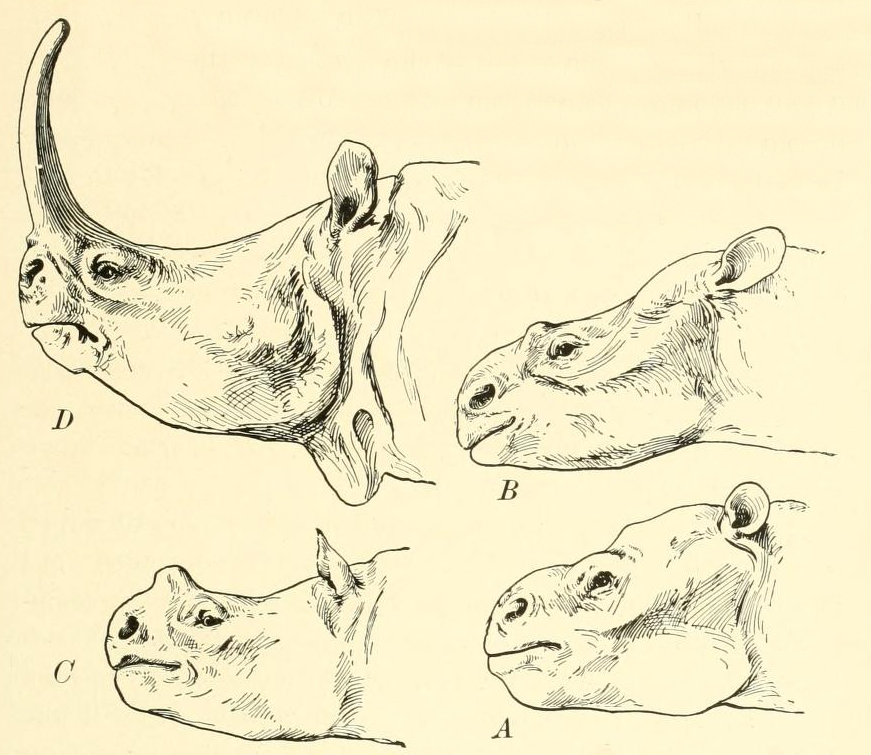
Restorations of the heads of various brontotheres by William Berryman Scott (1913), A: Palaeosyops, B: "Manteoceras" (=Telmatherium), C: Diplacodon, and D: "Titanotherium" (=Megacerops).

Lower jaw of P. paludosus, showing the prominent canine

Upon its description, Palaeosyops was not immediately recognized as a brontothere. In the early 1870s, Othniel Charles Marsh considered Palaeosyops to belong to a distinct family, the "Limnohyidae" (named after the junior synonym Limnohyus). It was only with the discovery of Diplacodon in 1875 that Marsh was able to connect the primitive Palaeosyops to derived brontotheres like Megacerops, and recognize their close relations. In 1879, Edward Drinker Cope classified Palaeosyops as a chalicothere. Ten years later in 1889, Cope instead classified the genus as a lambdothere. The first to place Palaeosyops and more derived brontotheres in the same family was Osborn in 1889, who noted that the discovery of the footbones of Chalicotherium showed that Palaeosyops was quite far apart from that genus, and thus not a chalicothere, and that the discovery of Diplacodon instead suggested close relations to the brontotheres, with which Palaeosyops was best classified in a single family.

In 1890, Gustav Steinmann and Ludwig Döderlein named the subfamily Palaeosyopinae to include the primitive brontotheres known at that time; Palaeosyops, Limnohyus (=Palaeosyops), and Diplacodon. The same subfamily name was used by Charles Earle in 1892, for a wider selection of brontotheres and relatives; Lambdotherium, Limnohyops (=Palaeosyops), Telmatherium, and Haplacodon (=Megacerops). In 1929, Osborn classified only Palaeosyops and Limnohyops in Palaeosyopinae, though noted that the subfamily may also include Eotitanops (placed in the separate subfamily Eotitanopinae). In 1945, George Gaylord Simpson combined Eotitanopinae with Palaeosyopinae, and grouped Eotitanops with Palaeosyops in Palaeosyopinae. Phylogenetic analyses of brontotheres do not find Eotitanops and Palaeosyops to be part of a monophyletic clade to the exclusion of more derived brontotheres.

Marsh first used Limnohyidae in 1875, fifteen years prior to Steinmann and Döderlein's Palaeosyopinae, and "Limnohyinae" could thus be argued to hold priority as the subfamily name. In 2010, Mader used Palaeosyopinae, restricted to just Palaeosyops, and argued that "Limnohyinae" (and "Limnohyidae") were invalid, since it is not clear from Marsh's original usage what genera he intended to include in the family. In 2008, Mihlbachler noted that Palaeosyopinae is "phylogenetically uninformative", since the subfamily in current usage contains only Palaeosyops.

Modern phylogenetic analyses consistently recover Palaeosyops as a very primitive brontothere, generally as the secondmost basal genus in the group, only more derived than Eotitanops. Palaeosyops was traditionally interpreted as a direct descendant of Eotitanops, but several fossils of the two genera are known from contemporary deposits and they are thus more likely to share an earlier common ancestor.

Mihlbachler, 2008

- - Danjiangia
  - - Lambdotherium
    - Brontotheriidae
      - Eotitanops
      - - cf. Eotitanops (Ellesmere Island)
        - - Palaeosyops
          - Brontotheriinae
            - Bunobrontops savagei
            - - Mesatirhinus junius
              - More derived brontotheres

Missiaen, Gunnell & Gingerich, 2011

- - Lambdotherium
  - Brontotheriidae
    - Eotitanops minimus
    - Eotitanops borealis
    - Eotitanops pakistanensis
    - - Palaeosyops fontinalis
      - - Palaeosyops paludosus
        - Balochititanops haqi
        - Brontotheriinae
          - Bunobrontops
          - - Mesatirhinus
            - More derived brontotheres

Mihlbachler & Prothero, 2021

- - Danjiangia
  - - Lambdotherium
    - Brontotheriidae
      - Eotitanops
      - cf. Eotitanops (Ellesmere Island)
      - Eotitanops pakistanensis
      - - Palaeosyops
        - Brontotheriinae
          - Bunobrontops savagei
          - - Balochititanops haqi
            - - Mesatirhinus junius
              - More derived brontotheres

== Paleobiology ==
Skulls of Palaeosyops and the junior synonym "Limnohyops". The differing robusticity is now interpreted as sexual dimorphism in Palaeosyops.

Skulls now referred to Palaeosyops differ in their robusticity. In the past, more robust skulls were referred to Palaeosyops and more gracile skulls were referred to the genus "Limnohyops". Recent revisions consider Limnohyops to be a junior synonym, and the differences to instead be evidence of sexual dimorphism. In addition to the overall robusticity of the skull, further traits that may have been sexually dimorphic in Palaeosyops, based on the differences between fossils, include the size and massiveness of the molars, the shape and massiveness of the lower jaw, and the shape of the sagittal crest. Canine size also varies between skulls, and may have been a sexually dimorphic characteristic.

== Paleoecology ==
=== Temporal range ===
In mainland North America, fossils of Palaeosyops occur throughout the entire Bridgerian land mammal age, corresponding to 50.1–46.3 million years ago. The Palaeosyops fossils from Ellesmere Island date to same timeframe as the Bridgerian, and the fossils of P. dayi from Pakistan are dated to the middle Early Eocene. The fragmentary fossils from Kazakhstan and Myanmar referred to Palaeosyops, should they truly belong to the genus, would extend its temporal range to the Middle Eocene. The Pondaung Formation has been dated to the late Middle Eocene, c. 40 million years ago.

=== Habitat and contemporary taxa ===
Although of relatively modest size compared to later brontotheres, Palaeosyops was the largest mammal in its environment. Fossils of Palaeosyops have generally been found in deposits that were once shallow lakes and mudflats. Associated faunas suggest that Palaeosyops preferred similar environments to modern tapirs, i.e. semitropical forests, and particularly areas near streams. A 2024 analysis of Palaeosyops tooth enamel revealed relatively low δ^{18}O values, lower than in other studied brontothere genera. This may suggest semiaquatic habits, or may alternatively be the result of living in a humid upland environment. It is possible that Palaeosyops preferred upland environments; the genus is rare in the Uinta and Washakie formations, and is (in North America) largely localized to the Bridger Formation, closer to the Bridger Mountains.

The Bridger Formation preserves fossils from a humid forest habitat. The fossil vertebrate fauna preserved in the Bridger Formation is one of the most diverse vertebrate faunas of its age. Mammals known from the formation include over a hundred species, including apatotheres, artiodactyls, chiropterans, carnivorans, condylarths, dermopterans, dinoceratans, edentates, hyaenodonts, insectivores, leptictids, marsupials, pantolestids, other perissodactyls, primates, rodents, taeniodonts, and tillodonts. Non-mammal vertebrates include various reptiles, including crocodilians, snakes, lizards, and turtles, as well as birds, amphibians, and fish. Non-vertebrate fossils from the Bridger include a variety of plant fossils, and fossils of various invertebrates, such as bees, earthworms, and caddisfly larvae.

In the Eocene, Ellesmere Island was warm and densely forested. The fossils referred to Palaeosyops from the island are from the highest levels of the Margaret Formation. The latest parts of the formation are not as fossiliferous as older levels, but the preserved fauna include an unidentified stylinodont, several groups of turtles (carettochelyids, trionychids, and emydids), birds, and the alligatorid Allognathosuchus. The Kuldana Formation preserves evidence of several different types of environments, including both relatively humid and relatively arid habitats. Fossils of P. dayi have been found at the highly fossiliferous Chorlakki locality, among other sites, where they co-occur with fossils of various other groups, including insectivores, rodents, adapid and omomyid primates, hyaenodonts, dichobunids, raoellids, archaeocetes (primitive whales, including Pakicetus), tillodonts, antrhacobunids, and isectolophids.
