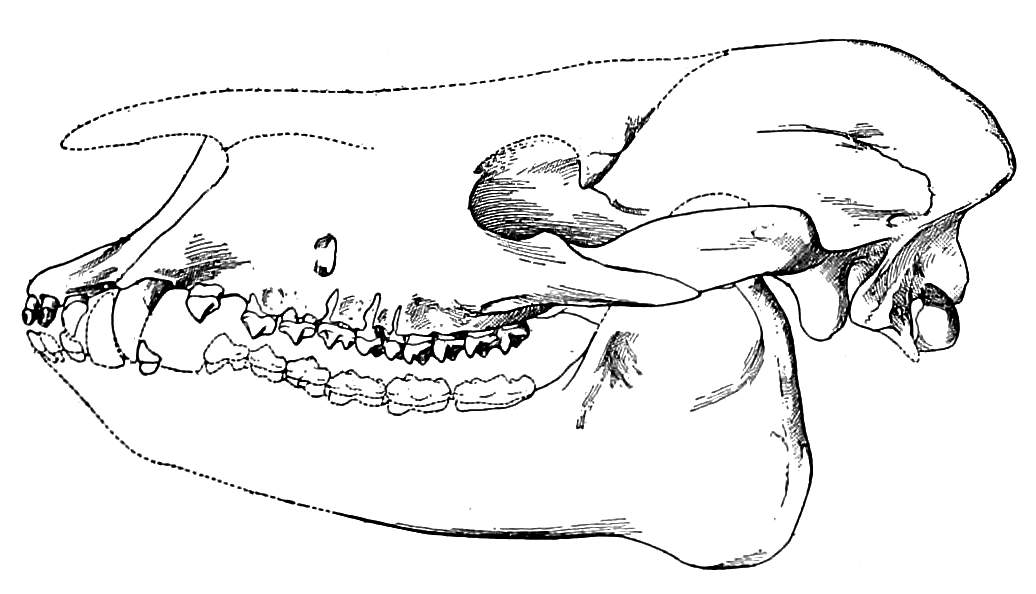
- Reconstruction of the skull of E. borealis, based on AMNH 14887

Scientific classification
- Kingdom: Animalia
- Phylum: Chordata
- Class: Mammalia
- Order: Perissodactyla
- Family: †Brontotheriidae
- Subfamily: †Eotitanopinae; Osborn, 1914
- Genus: †Eotitanops; Osborn, 1907

Type species
- †Palaeosyops borealis (original combination) Cope, 1880

Species
- †E. borealis (Cope, 1880); †E. gregoryi Osborn, 1913; †E. pakistanensis Missiaen, Gunnell & Gingerich, 2011

Synonyms
- Synonyms of E. borealis: Palaeosyops borealis Cope, 1880; Telmatotherium boreale (Cope, 1880); Lambdotherium brownianum Cope, 1881; E. brownianus (Cope, 1881); E. major Osborn, 1913; E. princeps Osborn, 1913; Synonyms of E. gregoryi: E. minimus Osborn, 1919

= Eotitanops =

Eotitanops Temporal range: Early Eocene, 53–50 Ma

Extinct genus of mammals

Eotitanops (lit. 'dawn titanic face') is an extinct genus of primitive brontothere that lived in Asia and North America during the Early Eocene. Eotitanops is generally considered to be the most basal (primitive) brontothere and may represent the earliest member of the group.

Two species of Eotitanops are currently recognized from North America, the type and larger species E. borealis, known from the Colorado, Wyoming, and Baja California, and the smaller species E. gregoryi (also known under the junior synonym E. minimus) from Colorado and Wyoming. Eotitanops fossils from Pakistan, contemporary with the North American species, have been assigned to a third species, E. pakistanensis. Fragmentary fossils of primitive brontotheres found on the Arctic Ellesmere Island in Canada may also belong to Eotitanops.

Eotitanops lived during the warm Early Eocene Climatic Optimum, and appears to have inhabited humid and densely forested habitats. Eotitanops was a small animal, weighing less than 100 kilograms (220 lb) and standing up to 75 centimetres (2.46 ft) tall at the shoulder. Other than features of its dentition, which place Eotitanops with the brontotheres, it would probably have been difficult to tell Eotitanops apart from primitive representatives of other perissodactyl lineages.

== Research history ==
=== Discovery and taxonomy ===
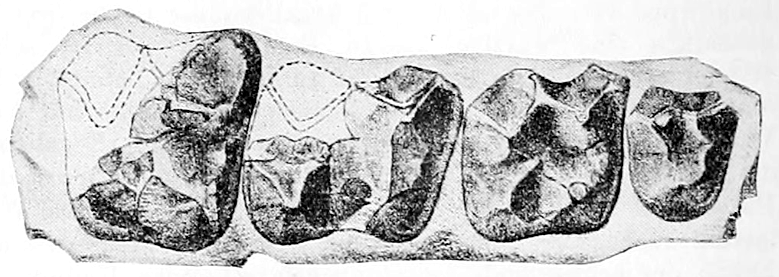
AMNH 4892, the type specimen of E. borealis

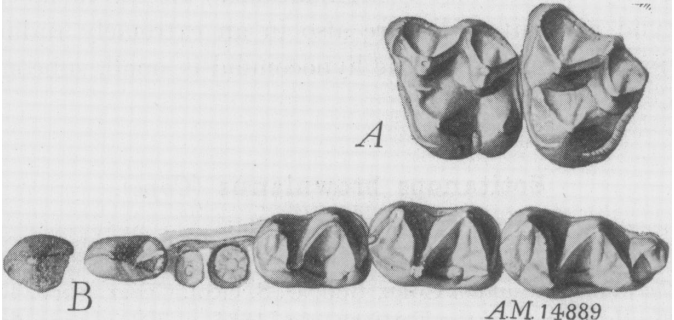
Teeth of the type specimen of E. gregoryi (AMNH 14889)

The type species of Eotitanops, E. borealis, was originally described by Edward Drinker Cope in 1880 as a species of the related Palaeosyops, P. borealis. Cope based the new species on a maxilla fragment (AMNH 4892), found in the Lost Cabin Formation of the Wind River Basin in Wyoming. The species name borealis was chosen in reference to Boreas, the Ancient Greek god of the north wind, which in turn alluded to the Wind River. In 1881, Cope named another species of primitive brontothere from the Lost Cabin Formation, Lambdotherium brownianum, based on the lower jaw AMNH 4885.

In 1897, Henry Fairfield Osborn determined P. borealis to be generically distinct from Palaeosyops, and transferred the species to the genus Telmatotherium, as T. boreale. In 1907, Osborn moved P. borealis to the new genus Eotitanops but did not provide a diagnosis for the genus. Osborn treated Eotitanops in slightly more detail in 1908, provided a formal diagnosis, and noted that he distinguished the genus from Palaeosyops mainly by its elongated skull; Palaeosyops is otherwise known for its brachycephalic (short and broad) skull. Osborn also referred Cope's Lambdotherium brownianum to Eotitanops, as E. brownianus. The name Eotitanops was derived from Ancient Greek ἠώς (dawn), Τιτάν (titan), and ὤψ (face), and was intended to evoke its presumed status as the first of the brontotheres.

In a 1913 revision based on fossils in the collections of the American Museum of Natural History, Osborn recognized two "phyla" (lineages) within Eotitanops, one composed smaller and more light-limbed forms, and one composed of larger forms. Osborn named three new species of Eotitanops, all from the Lost Cabin Formation: E. gregoryi, based on a lower jaw and maxillary fragment (AMNH 14889), E. princeps, based on a jaw, partial limb fossils, and vertebrae (AMNH 296), and E. major, based a metatarsal and a tibia fragment (AMNH 14894). E. gregoryi was noted for its small size, whereas E. borealis, E. princeps, and E. major were larger, and E. brownianus was intermediate in size. Osborn named E. gregoryi in honor of his colleague William King Gregory, who assisted Osborn in his research on brontotheres. Osborn named a sixth species of Eotitanops in 1919, E. minimus, based on isolated teeth from the Huerfano Formation in Colorado. Osborn distinguished E. minimus as even smaller than E. gregoryi but noted that the teeth of the two species were otherwise highly similar.

The best preserved skull of Eotitanops is the relatively poorly preserved AMNH 14887, found by Walter W. Granger in 1909 on Dry Muddy Creek in Wyoming. In 1929, Osborn designated AMNH 14887 as the neotype (replacement type specimen) of E. borealis. Since the original type specimen of E. borealis is still available, Osborn's designation of a neotype has no significance, and AMNH 4892 remains the type specimen.

In 1958, Richard Dehm and Therese zu Oettingen-Spielberg described fragmentary brontothere fossils from the Kuldana Formation of Pakistan. Dehm and Oettingen-Spielberg noted that the material was similar to Palaeosyops, but referred it to a new species of Eotitanops, E. dayi, based mostly on slight differences in the length-width ratio of the third molar. In 1991, Michael J. Novacek, Ismael Ferrusquía-Villafranca, John J. Flynn, André R. Wyss, and Mark A. Norell referred an isolated right second molar from the Las Tetas de Cabra Formation of Baja California, Mexico to Eotitanops cf. princeps.

=== Revisions and further discoveries ===
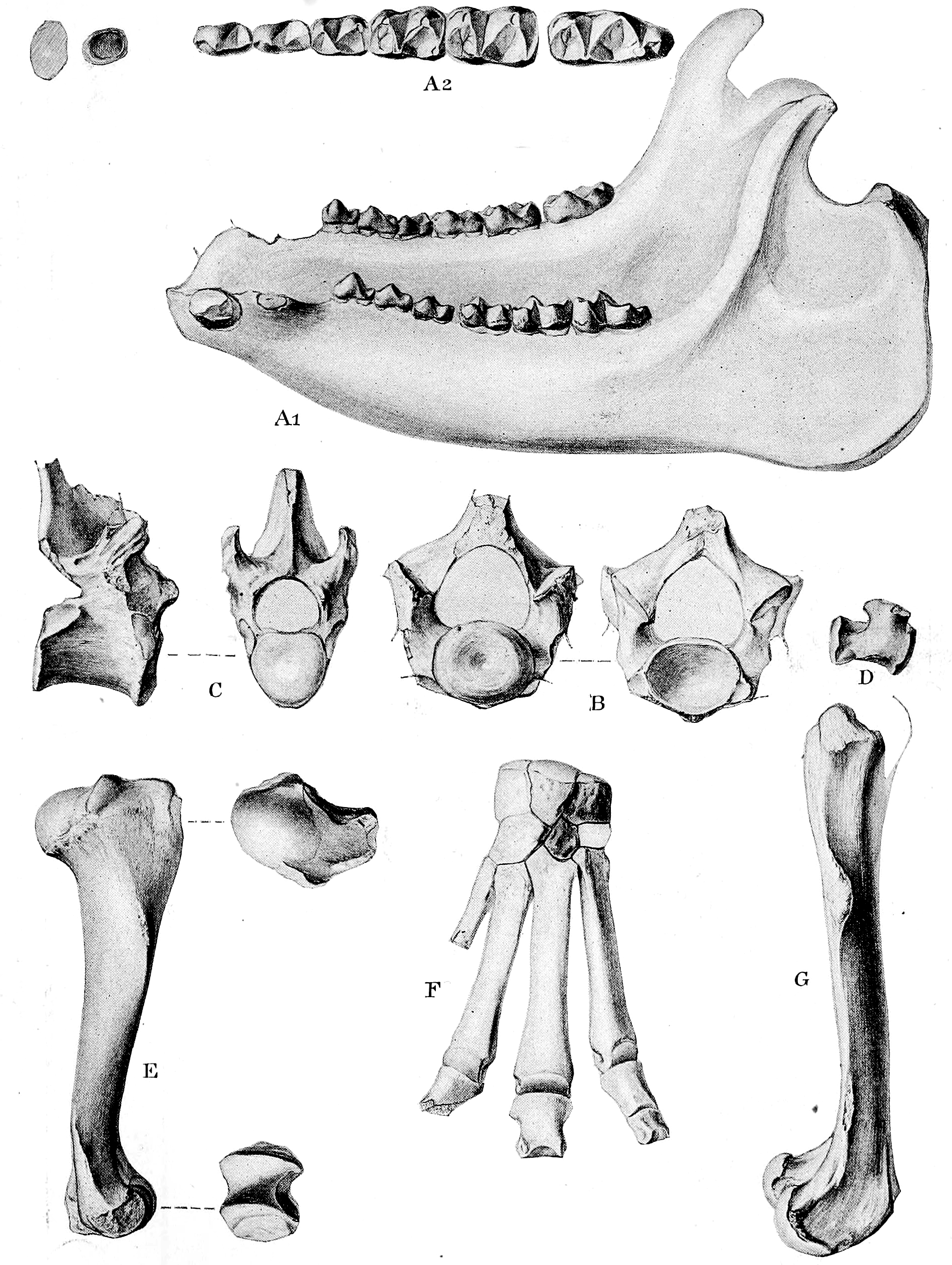
Type fossils of E. princeps (AMNH 296), now considered a synonym of E. borealis

In 2000, Gregg F. Gunnell and Vicki L. Yarborough published a new revision of the North American Eotitanops material, and the fossils of some other primitive brontothere genera. Gunnell and Yarborough distinguished Eotitanops as a genus from Palaeosyops by its smaller size, and several dental features, and recognized only two valid species of Eotitanops in North America: the larger E. borealis and the smaller E. minimus. E. brownianus, E. gregoryi, E. princeps, and E. major were all designated as synonyms of E. borealis, though some E. gregoryi material was also referred to E. minimus. According to Gunnell and Yarborough, E. borealis is distinguished from E. minimus by its larger size, and by the more elongated and better developed hypoconulid (a minor cusp) on the third molar.

In 2006, fragmentary brontothere fossils from the Margaret Formation of the Eureka Sound Group, on Ellesmere Island in northern Canada, were identified as cf. Eotitanops by Jaelyn Eberle. Eberle noted that the fossils were most similar to Eotitanops, and fell within the size range of E. borealis, but that they had some derived features in the upper premolars that appeared closer to Palaeosyops. The Ellesmere Island brontothere was thus suggested to possibly represent a transitional form between the two genera. In 2008, Matthew C. Mihlbachler doubted that the Ellesmere Island fossils belonged to Eotitanops, since they have a metacone (another cusp) on the second premolar; all more derived brontotheres have a metacone on the second premolar, whereas Eotitanops otherwise lacks it. Mihlbachler also designated E. dayi as a nomen dubium, doubting its classification in Eotitanops. In 2015, Eberle and David A. Eberth maintained that the original Ellesmere Island fossils were cf. Eotitanops, and also described additional brontothere fossils from the island, which they referred to Palaeosyops.

In 2010, Bryn J. Mader published a new species-level revision of Eotitanops and Palaeosyops from the United States. Mader's assessment of Eotitanops was broadly consistent with the previous revision by Gunnell and Yarborough; Mader recognized two species, distinguished mainly by size, and used the name E. borealis for the larger species. Mader used E. gregoryi for the smaller species, disagreeing with Gunnell and Yarborough's designation of E. gregoryi as a junior synonym of E. borealis. Per Mader, E. gregoryi is distinguished from E. borealis by its smaller size and the presence of an entoconid (another cusp) on the fourth premolar. The presence entoconid instead unites E. gregoryi with E. minimus, which Mader thus designated as a junior synonym of E. gregoryi.

In 2011, Peter Missiaen, Gunnell, and Philip D. Gingerich described a new species of Eotitanops from the Ghazij Formation of Balochistan, Pakistan, E. pakistanensis, and reassessed E. dayi as a species of Palaeosyops. E. pakistanensis was based on a left maxilla (GSP-UM 6558) and some isolated teeth, and was easily identified as a very primitive brontothere. Missiaen, Gunnell, and Gingerich identified E. pakistanensis as a species of Eotitanops based on the dental features of the genus as defined by Gunnell and Yarborough in 2000. E. pakistanensis was distinguished from the other two species by its third molar being subequal in size to the second molar; in E. borealis, the third molar is slightly larger than the second molar, and in "E. minimus" the third molar is smaller than the second molar. Missiaen, Gunnell, and Gingerich cited Mader's revision in the paper but continued to use the name E. minimus for the smaller species, without comment, as have some other researchers.

== Description ==
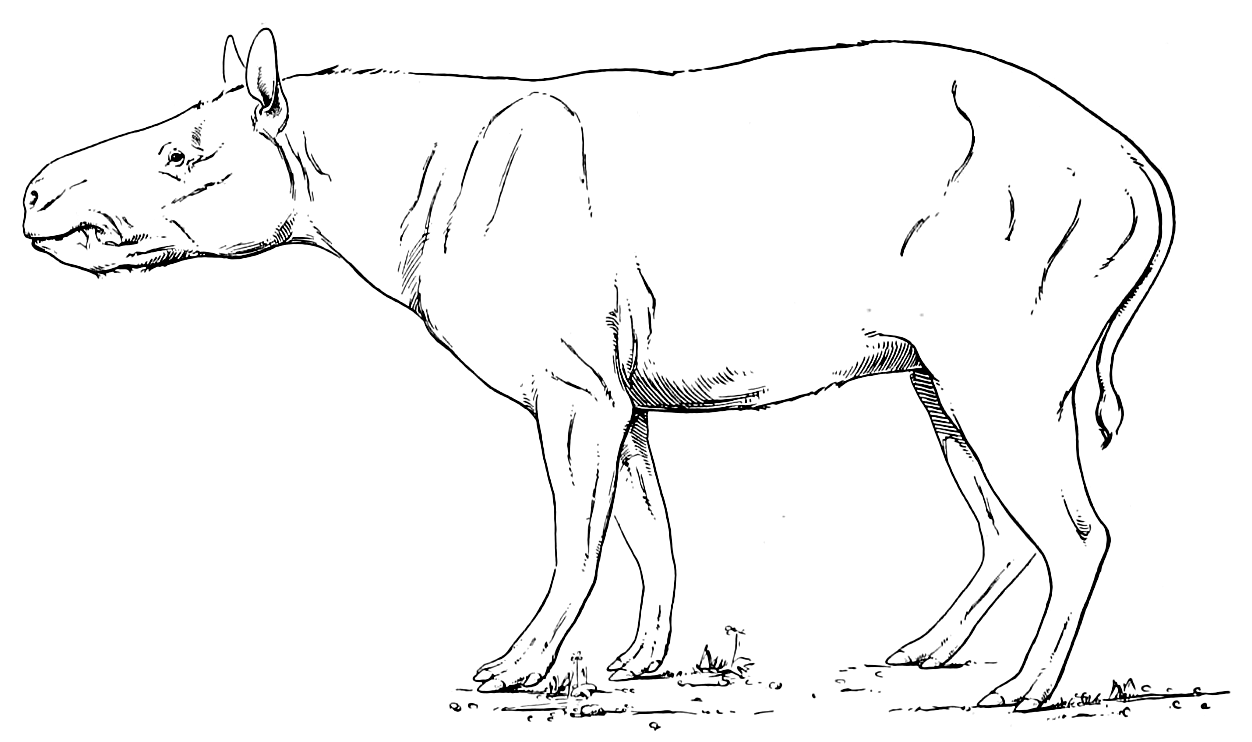
Life restoration of E. borealis

Eotitanops was a small and primitive brontothere. The earliest perissodactyls of different lineages were probably almost indistinguishable from each other. It would thus probably have been difficult to tell the difference between Eotitanops and other primitive (non-brontothere) perissodactyls, such as Hyracotherium. Eotitanops is classified as a brontothere because it had the characteristic dental features that set the group apart from other perissodactyl lineages.

Eotitanops fossils are generally fragmentary, complicating size estimates. Eotitanops has variously been described as rabbit-sized and sheep-sized. Osborn estimated E. gregoryi to have stood 45.6 centimetres (1.50 ft) tall at the shoulder, and E. princeps (=E. borealis) to have stood 66 centimetres (2.17 ft) tall at the shoulder. Osborn provided no size estimate for the largest fossils, which he assigned to E. major, but noted that they indicated an animal nearly the size of the modern South American tapir. Modern estimates vary in placing Eotitanops between 45 centimetres (1.48 ft) and 75 centimetres (2.46 ft) tall at the shoulder. As noted by Osborn, E. gregoryi was smaller than E. borealis. E. pakistanensis was similar in size to E. gregoryi. In 2023, Oscar Sanisidro, Mihlbachler, and Juan L. Cantalapiedra estimated the body mass of E. borealis at 91.5 kilograms (202 lb), that of E. pakistanensis at 49.8 kilograms (110 lb), and that of the cf. Eotitanops of Ellesmere Island at 76.6 kilograms (169 lb).

=== Skull ===
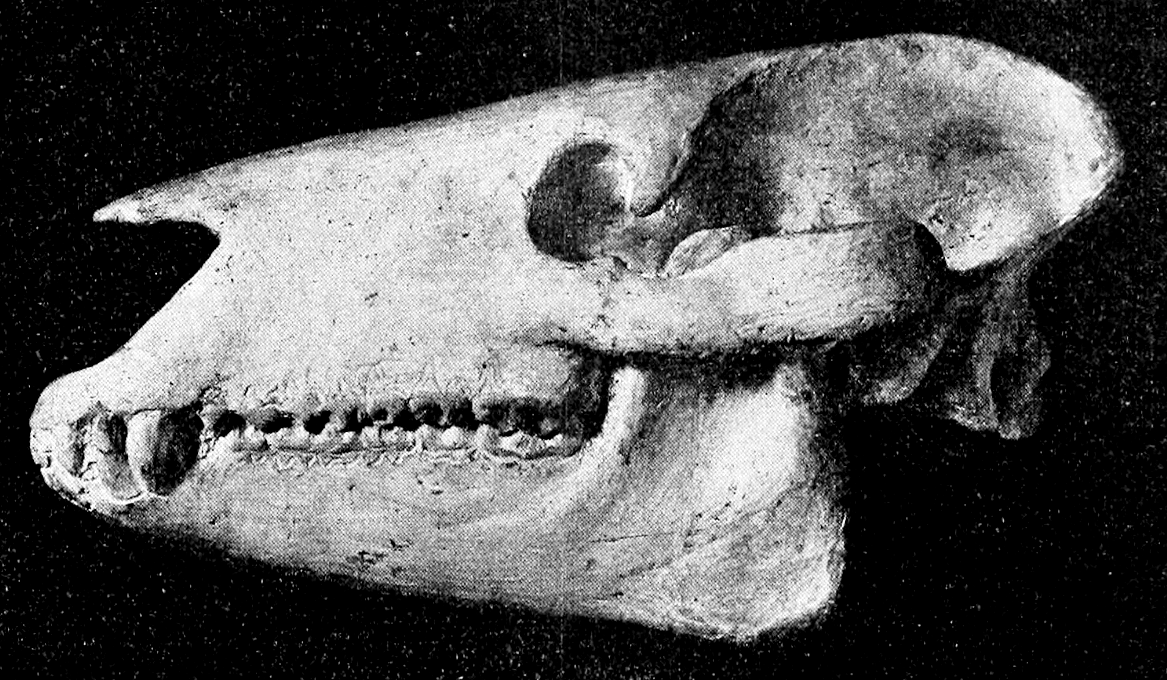
Model of a reconstructed E. gregoryi skull

Unlike later and more derived (advanced) brontotheres, Eotitanops is believed to have had a relatively long face, similar to other primitive perissodactyls. In more derived brontotheres, the eyes were positioned further forward on the skull. The relatively long face probably distinguishes Eotitanops from all other brontotheres. Reconstructions of Eotitanops with a long face are based on AMNH 14887, which has been heavily restored with plaster. In 2008, Mihlbachler stated that a complete skull of Eotitanops had since been identified, UCMP 132049, which showed that the preorbital (before the eyes) portion of the skull of Eotitanops was shorter than the postorbital (behind the eyes) portion, as in other brontotheres. Mihlbachler did not figure UCMP 132049, and Mader concluded in 2010 that the facial region of AMNH 14887 was probably much longer than in other brontothere genera, even accounting for possible distortion due to its restoration.

Other than the potential long face, there are no identified synapomorphic traits that distinguish Eotitanops from all other brontothere genera, but all other brontothere genera have synapomorphic traits that distinguish them from Eotitanops. Other features of the skull of Eotitanops include that it was relatively long and narrow, and that the molar series was relatively short when compared to the skull's total length.

=== Dentition ===
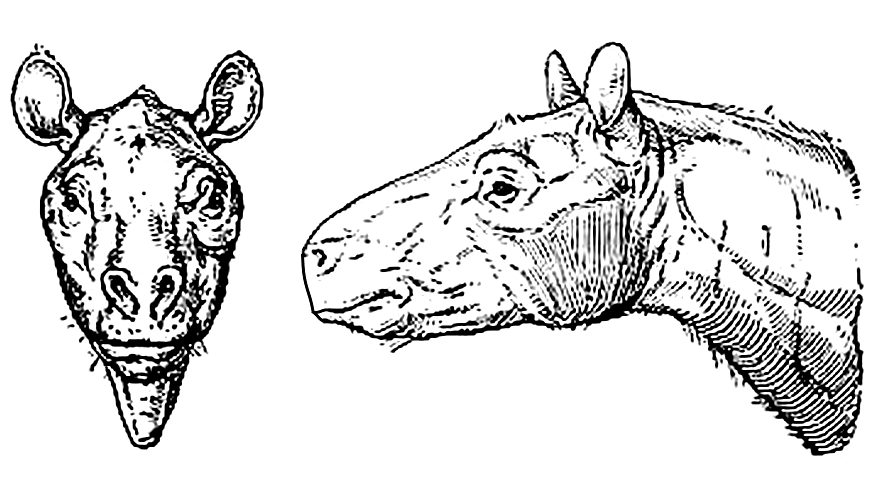
Life restoration of the head of E. borealis

Eotitanops had the dental formula 3.1.4.33.1.4.3. The upper canine was relatively well developed. There was a long diastema (gap between teeth) between the canines and first pair of premolars, and between the first and second pair of premolars, in both the upper and lower jaw.

The premolars were unmolarized (not molarized, i.e. not molar-like). The first premolar lacked bucally inflated paracones (the paracone, one of the cusps, did not have an enlarged cheek-side surface), and either had a short posterior shelf, or lacked it entirely. The second premolar lacked a metacone and had a paracone that was weakly mesiobucally inflated. The third and fourth premolars had poorly developed protocones and weak buccal ridges (cheek-side ridges). The protocones and hypocones of the upper molars were separated by shallow depressions; both the protocone and hypocone were rounded and low. On the third molar, the hypocone or pseudohypocone were variably present. The trigon basins (depression sfitting with the trigonids of the lower molars) of the upper molars was flattened. The mesostyles and parastyles were relatively small.

== Classification ==
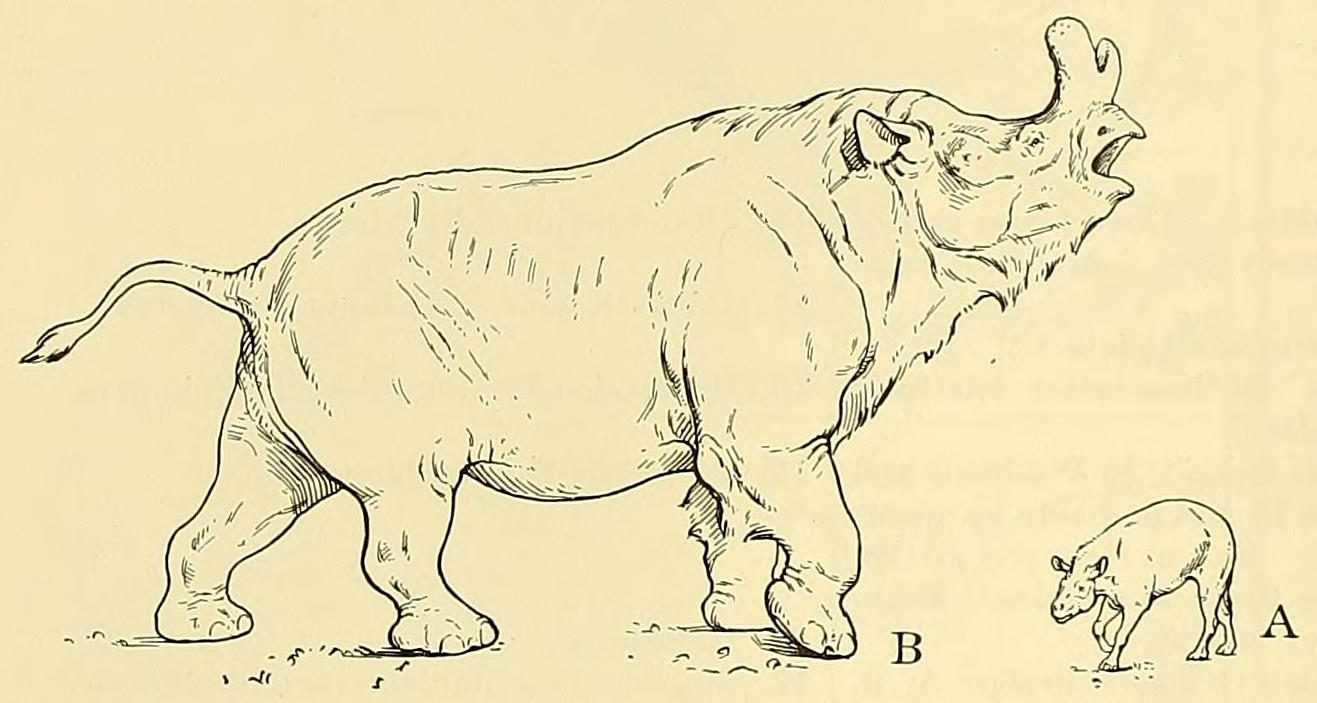
E. borealis (A) and the derived brontothere Megacerops (B), drawn to scale

Osborn named the brontothere subfamily Eotitanopinae in 1914 to contain just Eotitanops. In 1945, George Gaylord Simpson combined Eotitanopinae with Palaeosyopinae, and grouped Eotitanops with Palaeosyops in Palaeosyopinae. Phylogenetic analyses of brontotheres do not find Eotitanops and Palaeosyops to be part of a monophyletic clade to the exclusion of more derived brontotheres. Mader used Eotitanopinae in 2010, but restricted the subfamily to just Eotitanops. In 2008, Mihlbachler noted that Eotitanopinae is "phylogenetically uninformative", since it contains only Eotitanops.

Modern phylogenetic analyses consistently recover Eotitanops as the basalmost (most primitive) brontothere genus. Eotitanops is traditionally interpreted as the direct ancestor of the more derived Palaeosyops. Since several fossils of the two genera are known from contemporary deposits, it is more likely that they share an earlier common ancestor. The relations between the different species of Eotitanops are difficult to resolve due to the largely fragmentary remains. For clarity, brontotheres more derived than Mesatirhinus are omitted from the cladograms below.

Mihlbachler, 2008

- - Danjiangia
  - - Lambdotherium
    - Brontotheriidae
      - Eotitanops
      - - cf. Eotitanops (Ellesmere Island)
        - - Palaeosyops
          - Brontotheriinae
            - Bunobrontops savagei
            - - Mesatirhinus junius
              - More derived brontotheres

Missiaen, Gunnell & Gingerich, 2011

- - Lambdotherium
  - Brontotheriidae
    - Eotitanops minimus
    - Eotitanops borealis
    - Eotitanops pakistanensis
    - - Palaeosyops fontinalis
      - - Palaeosyops paludosus
        - Balochititanops haqi
        - Brontotheriinae
          - Bunobrontops
          - - Mesatirhinus
            - More derived brontotheres

Mihlbachler & Prothero, 2021

- - Danjiangia
  - - Lambdotherium
    - Brontotheriidae
      - Eotitanops
      - cf. Eotitanops (Ellesmere Island)
      - Eotitanops pakistanensis
      - - Palaeosyops
        - Brontotheriinae
          - Bunobrontops savagei
          - - Balochititanops haqi
            - - Mesatirhinus junius
              - More derived brontotheres

== Paleoecology ==
=== Temporal range ===
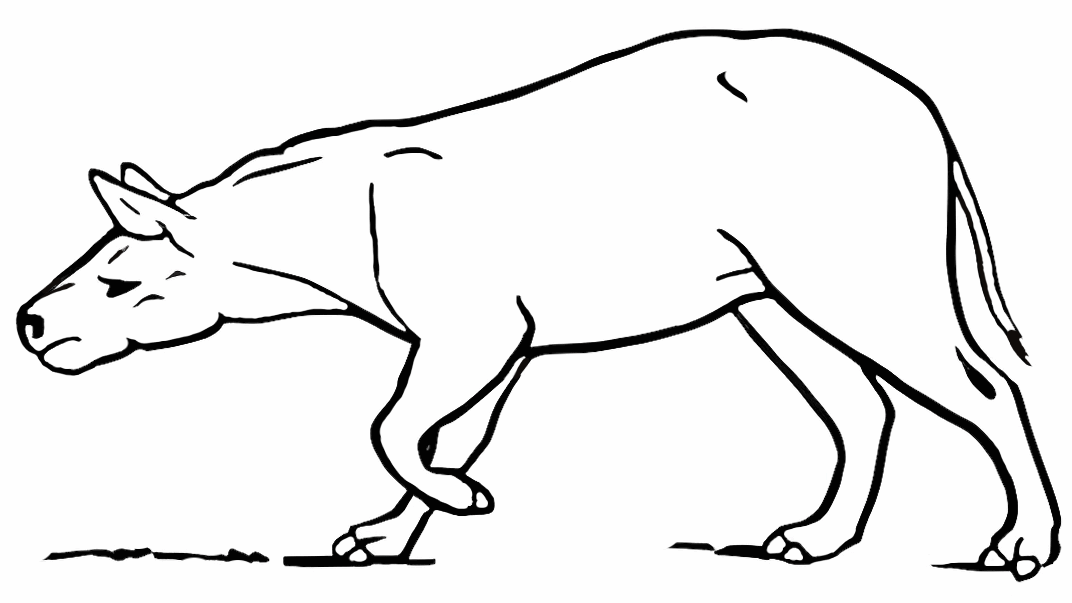
Life restoration of E. gregoryi

The earliest known fossils of Eotitanops are contemporaneous in Asia and North America. The Ghazij Formation deposits that yielded E. pakistanensis in Asia have been correlated to the magnetochron C23R. The earliest certain fossils in North America are E. borealis fossils from the earliest Bridgerian land mammal age (Br1a) of Wyoming, also correlated to C23R. C23R corresponds to about 52.5–51.5 million years ago. The Ellesmere Island fossils, which may belong to Eotitanops, have been dated as late Wasatchian (the land mammal age preceding the Bridgerian), and could thus represent a slightly older occurrence of the genus. The late Wasatchian strata that yielded the fossils have been dated to c. 53–52 million years ago. Eotitanops is not known from deposits later than the early Bridgerian in North America, going extinct about 50 million years ago.

=== Habitat and contemporary taxa ===
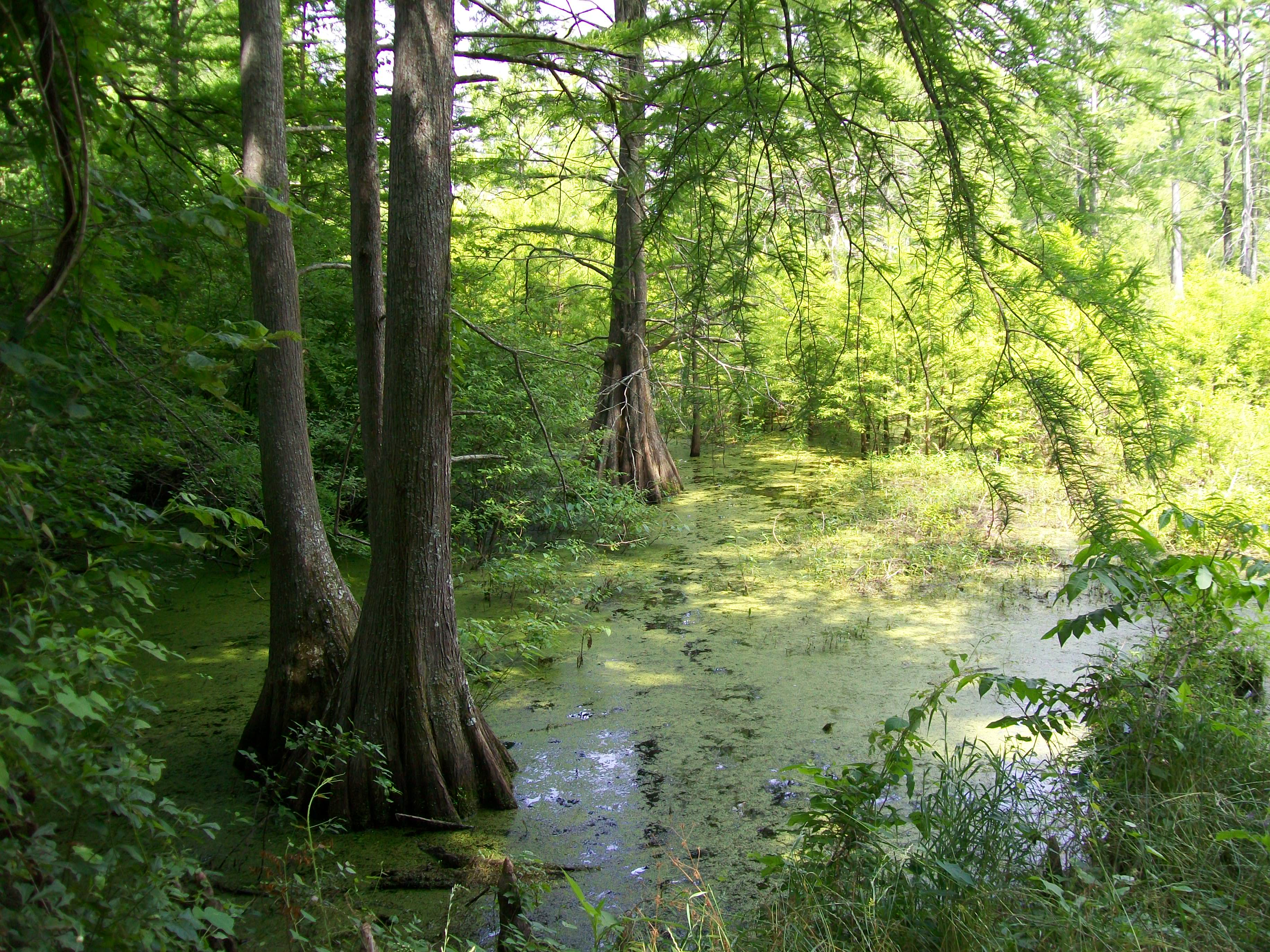
Wasatchian Ellesmere Island has been compared to the modern-day swampy forests of the southern United States

Eotitanops was a small browser. Fossils of Eotitanops do not make up more than a small percentage of the total number of mammals known from their fossil assemblages, suggesting that it may have been a relatively uncommon animal. In North America, both E. borealis and E. gregoryi are known from Colorado and Wyoming, and E. borealis is also known from Baja California.

The late Wasatchian of the Margaret Formation on Ellesmere Island is likely correlated with the extremely warm Early Eocene Climatic Optimum, and the local fauna is reflective of the Arctic in the time of a Greenhouse Earth. The local environment consisted of a lush and densely forested polar rainforest, relatively similar to the swamp-cypress and broadleaf floodplain forests found in the southeastern United States today. Summer temperatures reached at least 20 °C (68 °F) and there was high precipitation. Winter temperatures were probably just above freezing. The Wasatchian biota of Ellesmere Island was quite diverse, and in some respects different from faunas further south. Tapiroids and plagiomenids appear to have been abundant, whereas they were rare components in faunas further south. Some otherwise common Wasatchian animals, such as artiodactyls, equoids, and hyopsodonts, are not known from Ellesmere Island. Fellow perissodactyls included isectolophids (Homogalax) and helaletids (Heptodon and Thuliadanta). Local predators included mesonychids (Pachyaena), oxyaenodonts (Palaeonictis), and hyaenodonts (Prolimnocyon). Other large mammals included bear-like arctocyonians (Anacodon) and pantondonts (Coryphodon), and there was a variety of smaller mammals, such as multituberculates, primitive relatives of primates, leptictidans, rodents, cimolestans, and palaenodonts. In addition to mammals, the Ellesmere Island fauna included alligatorine crododilians (Allognathosuchus), birds (Gastornis and Presbyornis), as well as several turtles, lizards, snakes, salamanders, and fish.

The Wind River Basin experienced a subtropical climate and closed forested conditions during the Bridgerian. The climate in the basin was probably more humid and wetter in the Bridgerian than in the Wasatchian. The composition of the fauna was similar to modern rainforest faunas, though characterized by a higher diversity of both insectivores and carnivores than modern faunas. The high number of insectivores was probably due to the generally small body size of mammals at the time, and the frequency of carnivores probably relates to the then ongoing rapid diversification and evolutionary radiation of hyaenodonts. Other perissodactyls in the fauna included early equoids (Hyracotherium and Orohippus), rhinocerotoids (Hyrachyus), and tapiroids (Helaletes), as well as the fellow brontothere Palaeosyops. Dinoceratans (Bathyopsis) were among the largest mammals. Predators included mesonychids (possibly Mesonyx), oxyaenodonts (Patriofelis), several hyaenodonts (Prolimnocyon, Sinopa, Thinocyon, and Tritemnodon), and primitive relatives of carnivorans (Didymictis, Oodectes, Miacis, Vulpavus, Uintacyon, Viverravus). Other mammals included small and primitive artiodactyls (Antiacodon, Bunophorus, Hexacodus, and Microsus), plesiadapiforms, both notharctid and omomyid primates, leptictidans, rodents, cimolestans, peradectids, herpetotheriids, stylinodonts, tillodonts, hyopsodonts, and eulipotyphlans. The fauna also included several crocodilians, birds, turtles, lizards, snakes, and amphibians. Evidence of the paleoenvironment of the Huerfano Formation is limited, but it was evidently warm, with high precipitation, and the presence of several arboreal primates indicates the presence of forested areas. The Huerfano fauna closely corresponded to that of the contemporary Wind River Basin.

E. pakistanensis was found in the upper upper Ghazij Formation. Like the other sites, the upper Ghazij Formation is correlated to the Early Eocene Climatic Optimum. The Ghazij Formation was deposited at an ancient tropical shoreline, and the fossil plantlife suggests a rainforest environment. Contemporary fauna from the same level of the formation include the fellow primitive brontothere Balochititanops, the cambaythere Perissobune, and the primates Panobius, Indusius, and Sulaimania.
