= Church Buttes =

Butte formation in Wyoming, US

Coordinates: 41°30′20″N 110°08′06″W

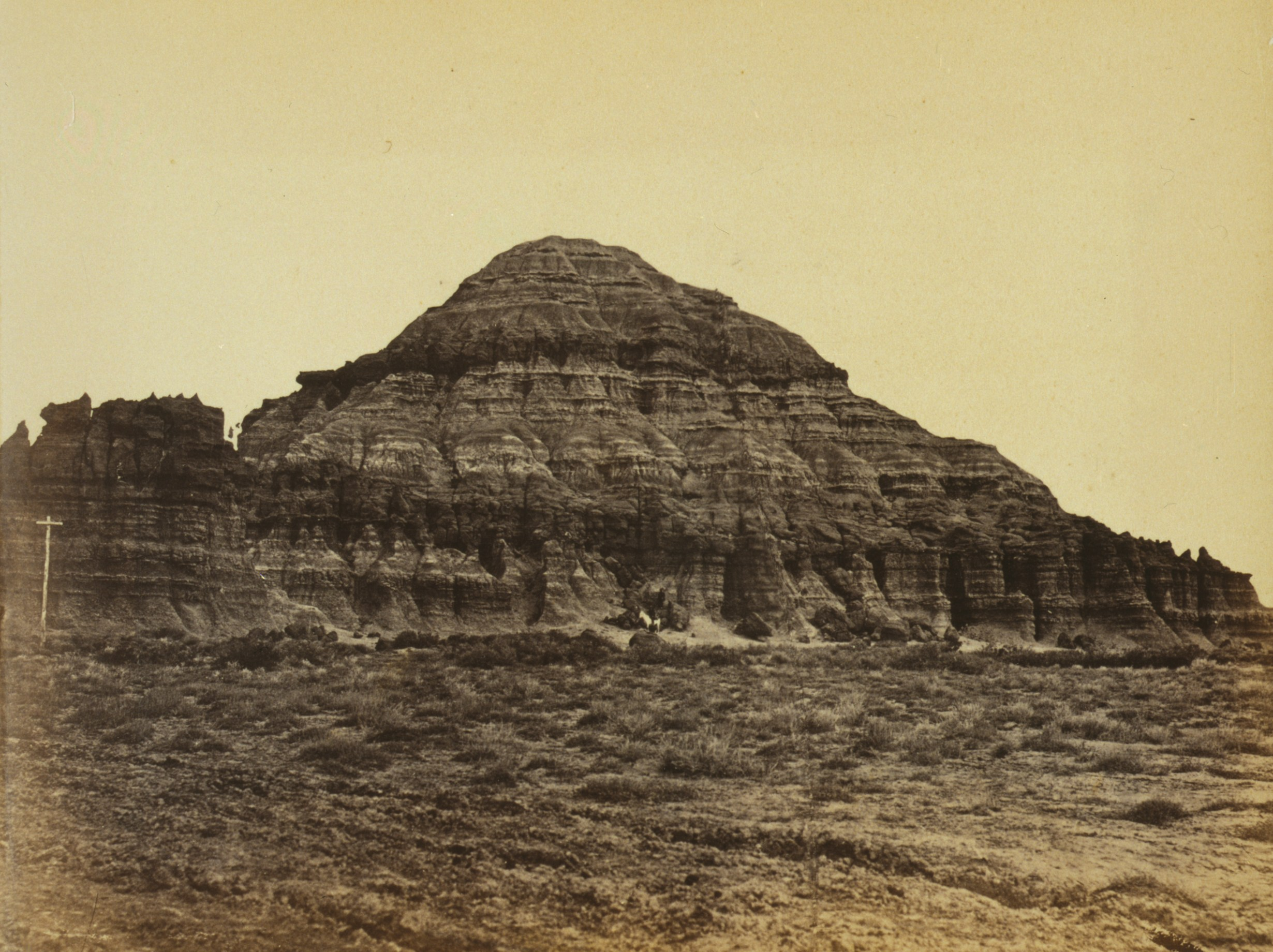
Photograph of the Church Buttes by Andrew J. Russell, 1868

The Church Buttes is an eroded sandstone butte formation in Uinta County, Wyoming. It is notable for its prehistorical archaeological remains as well as being the location a camp site for the first party of Mormon leader Brigham Young, July 7, 1847. It was the site of one of the relays for the pony express.

The site was also used as a route for the Overland Stage and Mail from 1862 to 1869, which ran from Denver to Salt Lake. The Overland route ran between Green River and Fort Bridger, with Church Buttes about 10 ten miles southwest of the present City of Granger, Wyoming. Church Buttes was a resting spot for early American pioneers in wagon trains heading west on the Overland Trail. Pioneers over the route had given the rock formation different names over the years, before Church Buttes became the common name. Church Buttes Station was used by the Pony Express from April 3, 1860 to October 26, 1861 to change horses.

The U.S. Geographic Names Information System identifies another Church Butte in Sweetwater County, Wyoming.

== Climate ==
According to the Köppen Climate Classification system, the area has a cold semi-arid climate, abbreviated "BSk" on climate maps. The hottest temperature recorded at the Church Buttes Gas Plant was 100 °F (37.8 °C) on June 24, 1985, while the coldest temperature recorded was −40 °F (−40.0 °C) on December 21, 1990.

Climate data for Church Battles Gas Plant, Wyoming, 1991–2020 normals, extremes 1955–present
Month	Jan	Feb	Mar	Apr	May	Jun	Jul	Aug	Sep	Oct	Nov	Dec	Year
Record high °F (°C)	54 (12)	59 (15)	80 (27)	80 (27)	89 (32)	100 (38)	98 (37)	98 (37)	94 (34)	82 (28)	67 (19)	60 (16)	100 (38)
Mean maximum °F (°C)	44.9 (7.2)	47.2 (8.4)	58.7 (14.8)	69.7 (20.9)	78.5 (25.8)	87.2 (30.7)	91.5 (33.1)	89.4 (31.9)	83.4 (28.6)	73.0 (22.8)	58.4 (14.7)	46.3 (7.9)	92.1 (33.4)
Mean daily maximum °F (°C)	31.2 (−0.4)	32.7 (0.4)	43.3 (6.3)	52.2 (11.2)	63.3 (17.4)	75.2 (24.0)	83.4 (28.6)	81.3 (27.4)	71.3 (21.8)	56.9 (13.8)	41.2 (5.1)	31.4 (−0.3)	55.3 (12.9)
Daily mean °F (°C)	21.9 (−5.6)	22.9 (−5.1)	33.0 (0.6)	39.9 (4.4)	50.2 (10.1)	60.7 (15.9)	69.0 (20.6)	67.1 (19.5)	57.4 (14.1)	44.1 (6.7)	31.0 (−0.6)	21.8 (−5.7)	43.2 (6.2)
Mean daily minimum °F (°C)	12.5 (−10.8)	13.1 (−10.5)	22.6 (−5.2)	27.6 (−2.4)	37.1 (2.8)	46.3 (7.9)	54.5 (12.5)	52.8 (11.6)	43.5 (6.4)	31.2 (−0.4)	20.8 (−6.2)	12.2 (−11.0)	31.2 (−0.4)
Mean minimum °F (°C)	−5.5 (−20.8)	−3.3 (−19.6)	7.1 (−13.8)	15.9 (−8.9)	24.8 (−4.0)	34.3 (1.3)	45.0 (7.2)	42.8 (6.0)	30.0 (−1.1)	14.9 (−9.5)	2.4 (−16.4)	−4.3 (−20.2)	−11.2 (−24.0)
Record low °F (°C)	−35 (−37)	−35 (−37)	−15 (−26)	−2 (−19)	11 (−12)	25 (−4)	30 (−1)	29 (−2)	5 (−15)	−19 (−28)	−16 (−27)	−40 (−40)	−40 (−40)
Average precipitation inches (mm)	0.53 (13)	0.35 (8.9)	0.48 (12)	0.79 (20)	1.21 (31)	0.86 (22)	0.42 (11)	0.70 (18)	1.09 (28)	0.73 (19)	0.47 (12)	0.24 (6.1)	7.87 (201)
Average snowfall inches (cm)	6.9 (18)	4.7 (12)	4.1 (10)	2.3 (5.8)	1.1 (2.8)	0.0 (0.0)	0.0 (0.0)	0.0 (0.0)	0.3 (0.76)	1.1 (2.8)	5.6 (14)	4.7 (12)	30.8 (78.16)
Average precipitation days (≥ 0.01 in)	3.5	3.1	3.5	4.4	5.6	4.0	2.9	4.1	3.9	3.7	3.5	3.6	45.8
Average snowy days (≥ 0.1 in)	3.0	2.5	2.6	1.2	0.5	0.0	0.0	0.0	0.1	0.7	2.4	2.4	15.4
Source 1: NOAA
Source 2: National Weather Service

== See also ==
- Granger, Wyoming stop before Church Buttes
- Millersville Station Site stop after Church Buttes
