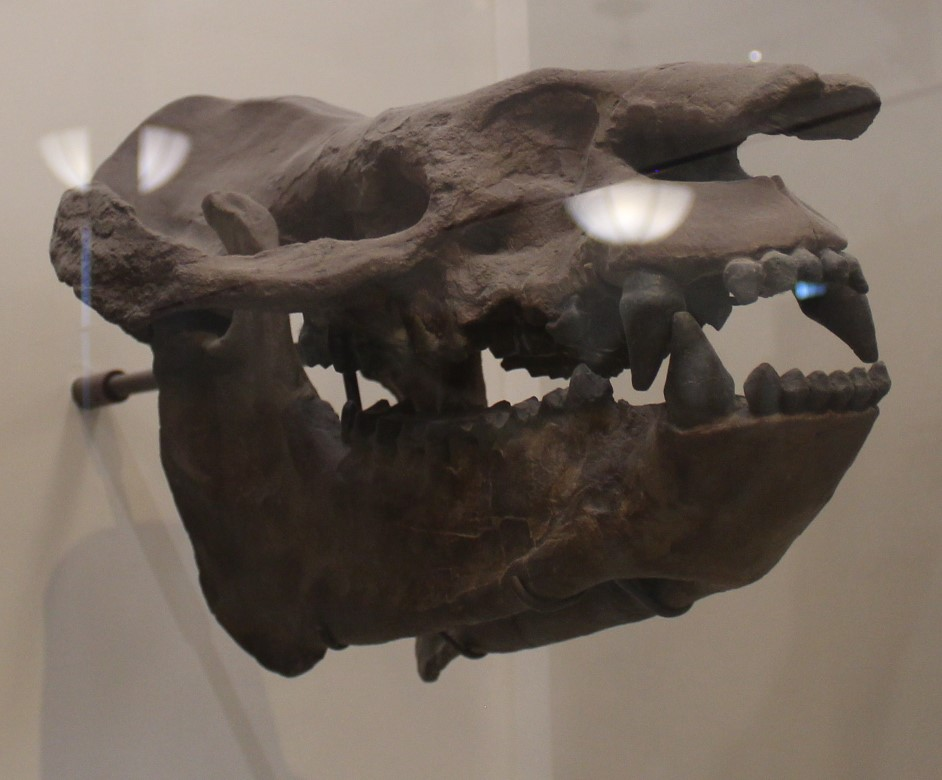
- T. validus skull, American Museum of Natural History

Scientific classification
- Kingdom: Animalia
- Phylum: Chordata
- Class: Mammalia
- Order: Perissodactyla
- Family: †Brontotheriidae
- Genus: †Telmatherium; Marsh, 1872

Species
- T. validus (O.C Marsh, 1872)

Synonyms
- Genus synonymy: Manteoceras; Telmatotherium; Leurocephalus; Species synonymy: Telmatherium validum; Telmatotherium validum; Telmatherium foris; Telmatherium cultridens

= Telmatherium =

Telmatherium Temporal range: Middle Eocene (late Bridgerian–early Uintan), 47–45.7 Ma

Extinct genus of mammals

Telmatherium is a genus of a North American brontothere. It lived during the Eocene epoch.

== Description ==
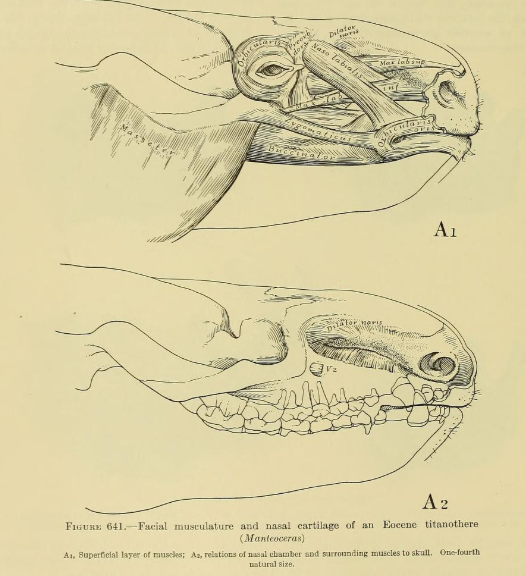
Musculature of Telmatherium (then known as Manteoceras)

Known from mostly cranial material, Telmatherium is a medium-sized hornless brontothere, with a notable post-canine diastema and sub-caniniform upper incisors. The first premolar is relatively simple, and there is a small diastema between the second and third lower premolars. Molar size of Telmatherium has been compared to Palaeosyops. A great amount of variance has been found in specimens of Telmatherium via isotopic analysis, especially so compared to other brontotheres such as Palaeosyops. The zyogmatic arch is less developed than other brontothere genera, and the nasals are described as compressed and laterally decurved. The unique nasal morphology of Telmatherium has been suggested to indicate the genus is ancestral to the later horned brontotheres, though others believe there is no direct ancestral relationship between the two.

== Classification ==
Described as T. validus in 1872 by paleontologist Othniel Charles Marsh, Telmatherium has had a convoluted classification history. The genera Manteoceras, Telmatotherium and Leurocephalus have all been synonymized with Telmatherium, and one species of Telmatherium, T. validus, is considered valid. While T. validum occasionally appears in literature, it is likely a typographical error originating from Henry Fairfield Osborn.

== Paleoecology ==
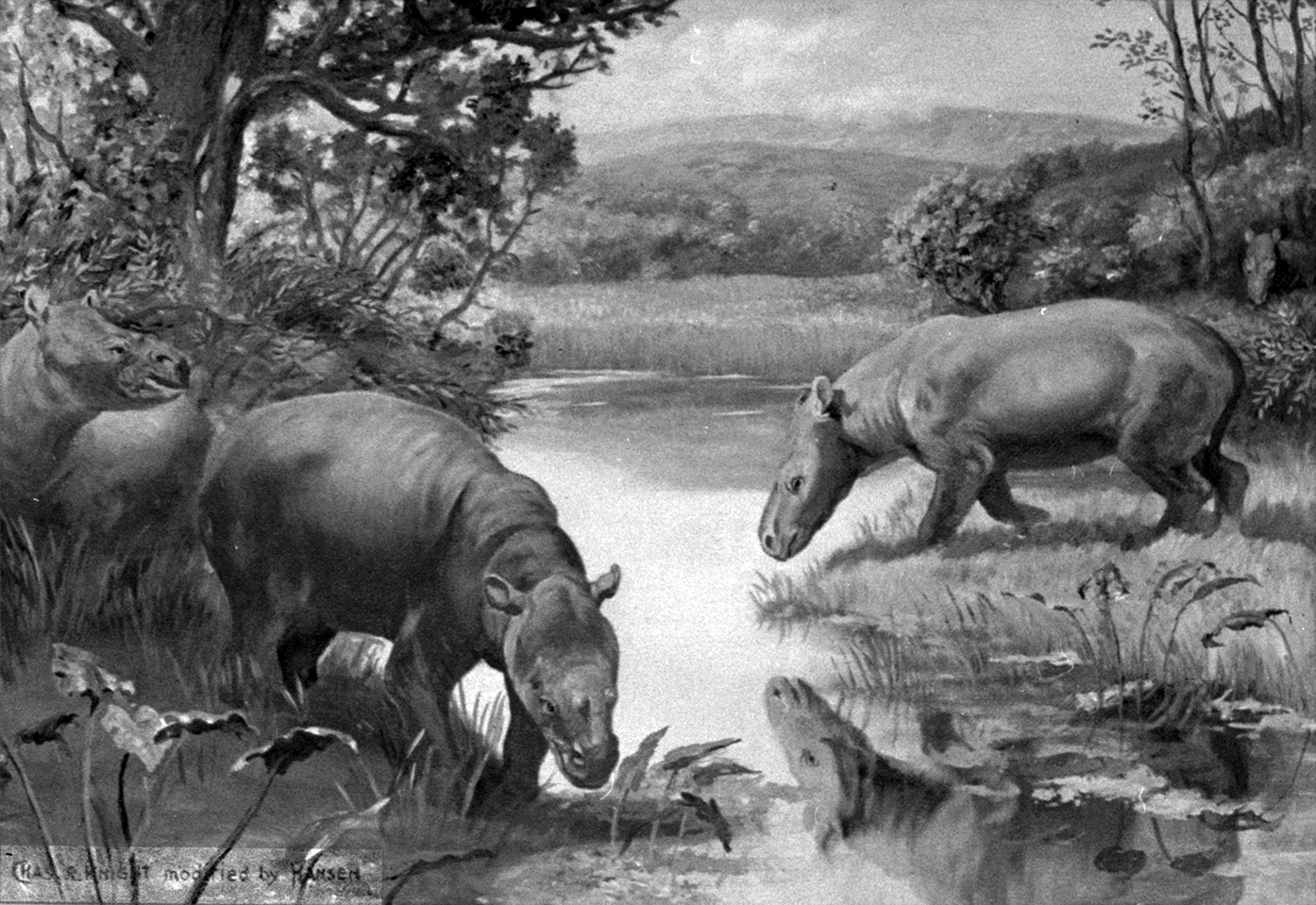
Telmatherium and Dolichorhinus by Charles R. Knight

Telmatherium is known from the Green River Formation, a lacustrine depositional site. Telmatherium lived alongside various rodents, gruiform birds and testudines.
