= Huerfano Formation =

Geologic formation in Colorado, United States

- Stratigraphic range: Paleogene
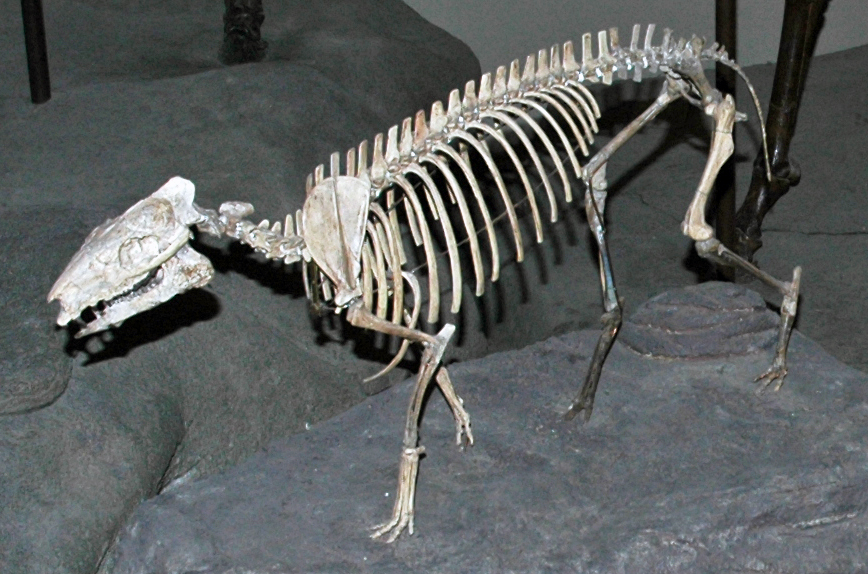
- Hyracotherium vasacciense (fossil horse) from the Huerfano Formation, Lower Eocene
- Type: Formation

Location
- Region: Colorado
- Country: United States

The Huerfano Formation is a geologic formation in Colorado. It preserves fossils dating back to the Paleogene period.

== See also ==
- List of fossiliferous stratigraphic units in Colorado
- Paleontology in Colorado
