= Irdin Manha Formation =

Geological formation in China

- Stratigraphic range: Eocene (Irdinmanhan); 47.8–42.7 Ma
- Type: Geological formation

Location
- Coordinates: 43.7°N 112.0°E
- Region: Inner Mongolia
- Country: China
- Approximate paleocoordinates: 45.2°N 105.7°E
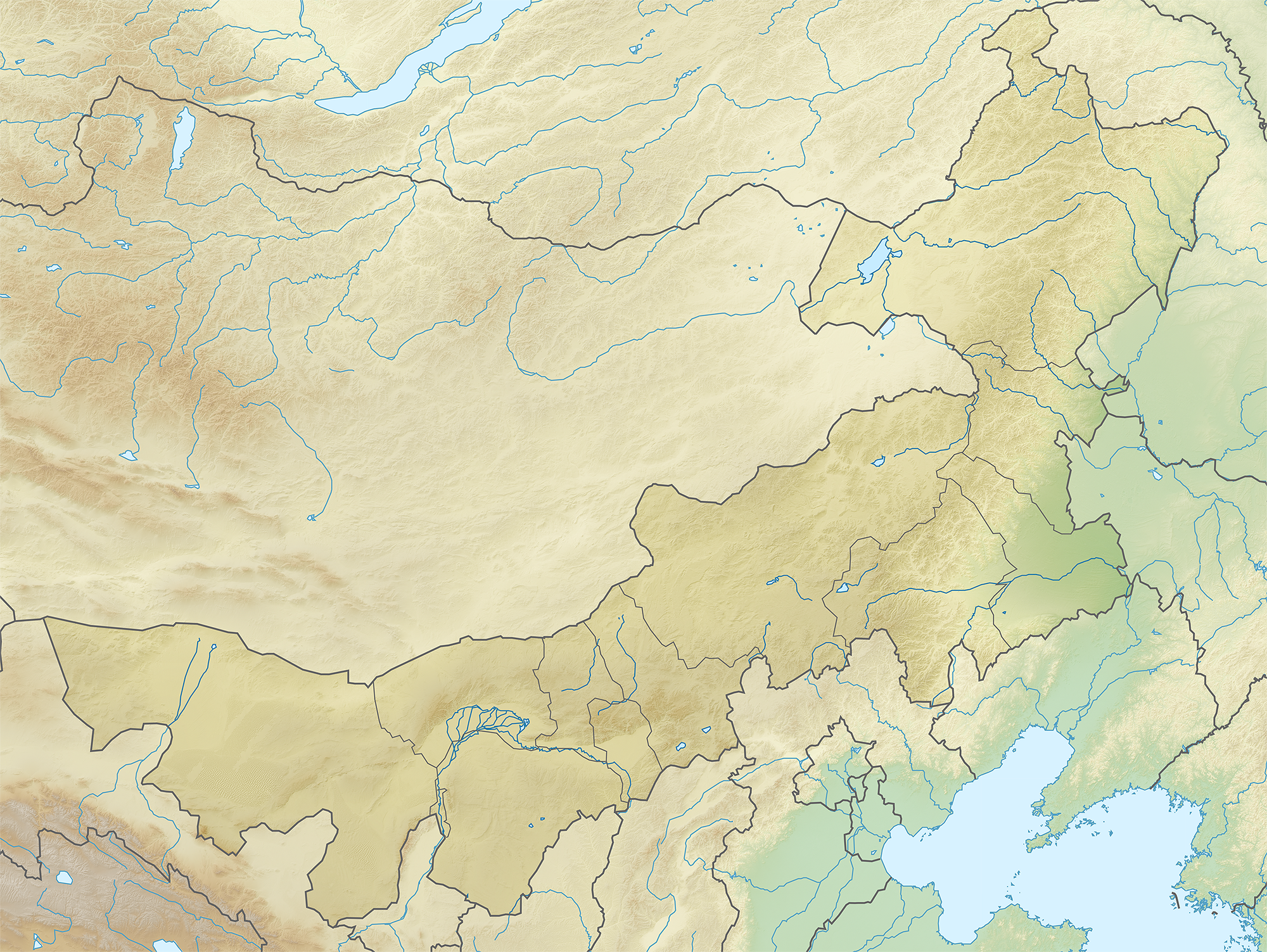
- Irdin Manha Formation (China) Irdin Manha Formation (Inner Mongolia)

The Irdin Manha Formation is a geological formation from the Eocene located in Inner Mongolia, China, a few kilometres south of the Mongolian border.

== Fossil content ==
Color key: Taxon / Reclassified taxon / Taxon falsely reported as present / Dubious taxon or junior synonym / Ichnotaxon / Ootaxon / Morphotaxon

Notes
Uncertain or tentative taxa are in small text
~~crossed out~~ taxa are discredited.

=== Mammals ===
U.S. paleontologists Henry Fairfield Osborn and Roy C. Andrews discovered two premolars on the site in 1923, and assigned the specimen to the new genus Eudinoceras because he believed it to be related to "Dinoceras" (now known as Uintatherium). Within a decade, however, as more complete specimens were recovered, the animal was identified as a Mongolian relative to the North American pantodont Coryphodon. The expedition also lead to the discovery of the only known skull of Andrewsarchus.

==== Artiodactyls ====
Artiodactyls reported from the Irdin Manha Formation
Genus	Species	Presence	Material	Notes	Images
Achaenodontidae?			An incomplete upper tooth (AMNH 20136).	Doubtfully assigned to the family.	
Cf. Archaeomeryx, gen indet.			Fragment of lower jaw (AMNH 20173).	A traguliform.	
Andrewsarchus	A. mongoliensis	Around Telegraph Line Camp.	A large skull.	A relative of entelodonts formerly thought to be a mesonychid.	
Erlianhyus	E. primitivus	Irdin Manha, Erlian Basin, Nei Mongol.	A right upper maxilla with P3–M3 (IVPP V 28275).	A basal artiodactyl.	
Gobiohyus	G. orientalis	Telegraph Line Camp.	Jaw elements.	A helohyid also found in the Ulan Shireh Formation.	
Gobiohyus	G. pressidens	Telegraph Line Camp.	Partial right rami.	A helohyid.	
Gobiohyus	G. robustus	Telegraph Line Camp.	Left ramus (AMNH 20246).	A helohyid.	
Obotherium	O. parvum	Irdin Manha, Erlian Basin, Nei Mongol.	Teeth and lower jaws	A tapirulid.	

==== Cimolestans ====
Cimolestans reported from the Irdin Manha Formation
Genus	Species	Presence	Material	Notes	Images
Eudinoceras	E. mongoliensis		2 premolars & jaw elements.	A coryphodontid.	

==== Dinoceratans ====
Dinoceratans reported from the Irdin Manha Formation
Genus	Species	Presence	Material	Notes	Images
Gobiatherium	G. mirificum	25 miles southwest from Iren Dabasu.	Skull, jaws & limb elements.	An uintatheriid.	

==== Ferae ====
Ferae reported from the Irdin Manha Formation
Genus	Species	Presence	Material	Notes	Images
Miacis	M. invictus		Isolated upper molar (AMNH 20137).	A miacid.	
Propterodon	P. irdinensis		Jaw fragments.	A hyaenodontid.	
Sarkastodon	S. mongoliensis	About 25 miles southwest of Iren Dabasu.	Skull & jaws.	An oxyaenid.	

==== Glires ====
Glires reported from the Irdin Manha Formation
Genus	Species	Presence	Material	Notes	Images
Advenimus	A. burkei	Near Camp Margetts.	Jaw elements.	A ctenodactyloid rodent.	
Asiomys	A. dawsoni	Huheboerhe.	Fragment of right calcaneus (IVPP V24417).	An ischyromyid rodent.	
Erenlagus	E. anielae	Huheboerhe.	Teeth.	A stem-lagomorph.	
Gomphos	G. shevyrevae	Huheboerhe escarpment.	Teeth & foot elements.	A mimotonid.	
Ischyromyidae genus indet.	Species A	Irdin Manha escarpment.	Right calcaneus (IVPP V24416).	Relatively large ischyromyid rodent, calcaneus comparable in size to that of a coypu or Asiatic brush-tailed porcupine.	
Ischyromyidae genus indet.	Species B	Daoteyin Obo.	Right calcaneus (IVPP V24418).	Large ischyromyid rodent with calcaneus matching in length that of a coypu & similar in structure to that of Paramys.	
Mimolagus	M. aurorae	Irdin Manha escarpment.	Teeth & foot elements.	A large mimotonid.	
Pappocricetodon	P. neimongolensis	Huheboerhe.	Teeth.	A cricetid rodent.	
Pappocricetodon	P. cf. P. zhongtiaensis	Huheboerhe.	A left molar.	A cricetid rodent.	
Pappocricetodon	P. sp.	Huheboerhe.	A right molar.	A cricetid rodent.	
Paramyidae	Paramyid spp.		Teeth & jaws.	3 sizes of paramyid rodents, possibly different species.	
Paramyidae	?Paramyid sp.		Left jaw (AMNH 80801).	Possible small paramyid rodent.	
Simplicimys	S. bellus	Huheboerhe.	Teeth.	A ctenodactyloid rodent also known from the Arshanto Formation.	
Strenulagus	S. solaris	Irdin Manha and Huheboerhe localities.	Isolated cheek teeth, fragmentary upper incisors (dI2) and postcranial elements.	A stem-lagomorph also known from the Khaychin Formation.	
Tamquammys	T. fractus	Huheboerhe.	Right maxilla (V17798).	A ctenodactyloid rodent.	
Tamquammys	T. wilsoni		Teeth.	A ctenodactyloid rodent also known from the Arshanto & Nomogen formations.	
Yongshengomys	Y. extensus	Huheboerhe.	Teeth.	A ctenodactyloid rodent.	
Yuomys	Y. huheboerhensis	Huheboerhe.	Teeth.	A ctenodactyloid rodent.	
Yuomys	Y. sp. A	Huheboerhe.	A right molar (V17805).	A ctenodactyloid rodent.	
Yuomys	Y. sp. B	Huheboerhe.	A right molar (V17806).	A ctenodactyloid rodent.	
Yuomys	Y. sp. C	Huheboerhe.	A right molar (V17807).	A ctenodactyloid rodent.	

==== Mesonychians ====
Mesonychians reported from the Irdin Manha Formation
Genus	Species	Presence	Material	Notes	Images
Hapalodectes	?H. auctus		An upper molar or possibly premolar (AMNH 20130).	A hapalodectid.	
Hapalodectes	H. serus	Around Telegraph Line Camp.	Lower cheek tooth (AMNH 20172).	A hapalodectid.	
Harpagolestes	H. leei	Huheboerhe & Daoteyin Obo.	Tooth elements.	A mesonychid.	
Mesonychidae	Gen. indet.		AMNH 20132.	About the size of Harpagolestes uintensis.	
Mesonychidae	Gen. indet.		Isolated tooth (AMNH 20133).	About the size of Synoplotherium lanius.	
Mongolonyx	M. dolichognathus	7 miles west of Camp Margetts.	Jaw elements.	A large mesonychid.	

==== Panperissodactyla ====
Panperissodactylas reported from the Irdin Manha Formation
Genus	Species	Presence	Material	Notes	Images
Cooperia	C. totadentata	Telegraph Line Camp, 23 miles southeast of Iren Dabasu.	Front of skull (AMNH 20116).	Generic name preoccupied, renamed Forstercooperia.	
Desmatotherium	D. fissum		Upper jaw fragment.	A helaletid.	
Desmatotherium	D. mongoliense	Irdin Manha escarpment, Duheminboerhe, Huheboerhe & Chaganboerhe.	Parts of 10 individuals.	A helaletid also found in the Mergen Formation.	
Forstercooperia	F. totadentata	Telegraph Line Camp, 23 miles southeast of Iren Dabasu.	Front of skull (AMNH 20116).	A paraceratheriid, originally named Cooperia.	
Forstercooperia	F. ulanshirehensis	Irdin Manha site.	Jaw elements.	A paraceratheriid also known from the Ulan Shireh Formation.	
Gnathotitan	G. berkeyi	Irdin Manha.	Jaw elements.	A brontothere.	
Hyotitan	H. thomsoni	Camp Margetts		A brontothere.	
Lophialetes	L. expeditus		Jaw elements.	A lophialetid.	
Lophialetes	L. minutus		Upper molar.	A lophialetid.	
Metatelmatherium	M. ultimum	Camp Margetts.	Skull & lower jaw (AMNH 26411).	A brontothere. Previously treated under the synonym Metatelmatherium cristatum.	
Metatelmatherium	M. parvum	Irdin Manha.	Fragment of left lower jaw (AMNH 20168).	A brontothere. Considered a nondiagnostic nomen dubium.	
Pappaceras	P. confluens	Upper gray clays & Camp Margetts area.	Skull & jaw elements.	A paraceratheriid.	
Paracolodon	P. fissus	Duheminboerhe & Daoteyin Obo.	Skull elements & teeth.	A helaletid.	
Protitan	P. grangeri	Spring Camp, East Mesa, Shara Murun region. Irdin Manha.	Skulls and skull elements.	A brontothere. Several additional Protitan species have been reported from the formation, now regarded as synonyms of P. grangeri (P. bellus, P. robustus, P. obliquidens).	
Protitan	P. minor	Camp Margetts.	Skull elements.	A brontothere.	
Rostriamynodon	R. grangeri	East of Camp Margetts.	Complete skull & mandible (AMNH 107635).	An amynodontid.	
Teleolophus	T. medius		Teeth & jaws.		
Triplopus	T. proficiens		Lower jaw & isolated teeth.	A rhinocerotoid.	

==== Primates ====
Primates reported from the Irdin Manha Formation
Genus	Species	Presence	Material	Notes	Images
Tarkops	T. mckennai	Huheboerhe.	Incomplete left lower jaw (IVPP V16424).	An omomyid.	

=== Reptiles ===
==== Birds ====
Birds reported from the Irdin Manha Formation
Genus	Species	Presence	Material	Notes	Images
Buteoninae		Chimney Butte.	Left coracoid (AMNH FR 2941).	Specimen reassigned to Eogrus? sp.	
Eogrus	E. aeola	Chimney Butte.	Right metatarsus (AMNH 2936).	An eogruid.	
Eogrus	E.? sp.	Chimney Butte.	Left coracoid (AMNH FR 2941).	Formerly thought to represent a buteonine, now thought to be an eogruid.	
Telecrex	T. grangeri	Chimney Butte, Shara Murun region.	An incomplete right femur (AMNH 2942).	A guineafowl, formerly thought to be a rail.	

==== Crocodilians ====
Crocodilians reported from the Irdin Manha Formation
Genus	Species	Presence	Material	Notes	Images
Asiatosuchus	A. grangeri	25 miles southwest of Iren Dabasu.	Portions of at least 2 individuals.	A crocodyloid.	

==== Testudines ====
Testudines reported from the Irdin Manha Formation
Genus	Species	Presence	Material	Notes	Images
"Adocus"	"A". orientalis	Telegraph Line Camp.	Anterior half of plastron (AMNH 6356).	An adocid.	
Amyda?	A.? johnsoni	Telegraph Line Camp.	Two-thirds of a carapace (AMNH 6357) & many carapace fragments (AMNH 6359).	A softshell turtle.	
Trionychidae	Indeterminate	Telegraph Line Camp.	Several kinds of sculptured fragments (AMNH 6360).	Remains of softshell turtles.	

=== Fish ===
Fish reported from the Irdin Manha Formation
Genus	Species	Presence	Material	Notes	Images
Pappichthys	P. mongoliensis	Telegraph Line Camp.	Vertebrae.	Specimens now believed to represent Siluriformes.	
Siluriformes	Indeterminate	Telegraph Line Camp, Chahar Province.	5 vertebrae (AMNH 8535).	A catfish likely related to ictalurids. Formerly assigned to Pappichthys mongoliensis.	

== See also ==
- List of fossil sites
