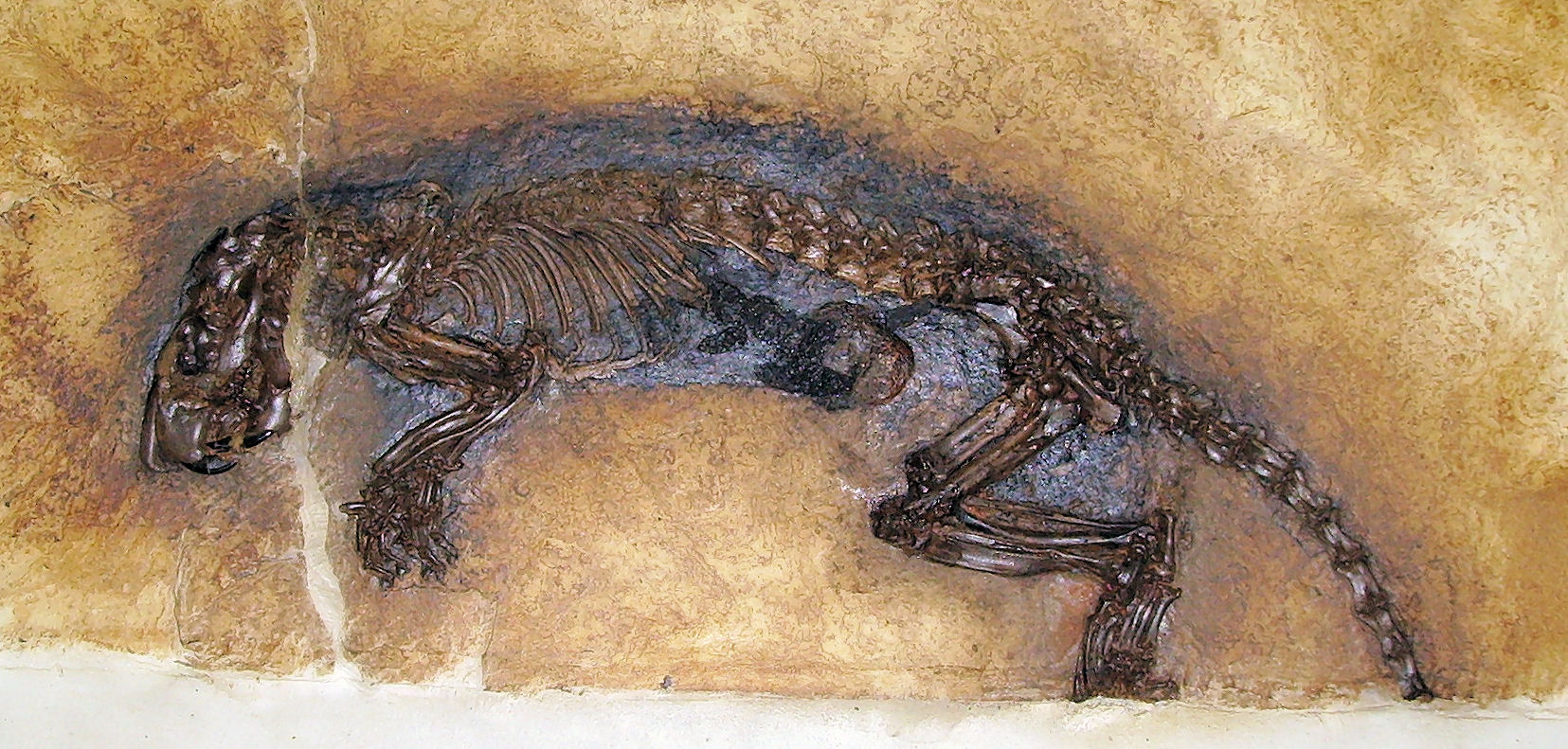
- Masillamys at the Senckenberg collection

Scientific classification
- Kingdom: Animalia
- Phylum: Chordata
- Class: Mammalia
- Infraclass: Placentalia
- Order: Rodentia
- Family: †Ischyromyidae
- Subfamily: †Microparamyinae
- Genus: †Masillamys; Tobien, 1954

Species
- Masillamys beegeri; Masillamys cosensis; Masillamys mattaueri

= Masillamys =

Masillamys Temporal range: Priabonian

Extinct genus of rodents

Masillamys is an extinct genus of rodent. It was named in 1954 by Tobien based on fossils found in the Messel Pit, Germany. It is considered to be a sister genus to the Hartenbergeromys, Lophiparamys, Mattimys, Microparamys, Pantrogna, Sparnacomys, and Strathcona genera.
