= Gobiomyidae =

Gobiomyidae Temporal range: middle to late Eocene

Scientific classification
- Domain: Eukaryota
- Kingdom: Animalia
- Phylum: Chordata
- Class: Mammalia
- Order: Rodentia
- Superfamily: Ctenodactyloidea
- Family: †Gobiomyidae; Wang, 2001

Genera
- †Gobiomys †Mergenomys †Youngomys

Extinct family of rodents

Gobiomyidae is a small extinct family of rodents from the Eocene of Asia. The family contains four genera (one remains unnamed) and belongs to the superfamily Ctenodactyloidea (Wang, 2001), which also contains the living Laotian rock rat and gundis and their fossil relatives (families Diatomyidae and Ctenodactylidae, respectively). When Wang named the family, gobiomyids were considered the closest known relatives of Ctenodactylidae, but newer research indicates that Diatomyidae is more closely related to living ctenodactylids (Dawson et al., 2006).
