= Yongshengomys =

Yongshengomys Temporal range: Middle Eocene

Scientific classification
- Kingdom: Animalia
- Phylum: Chordata
- Class: Mammalia
- Infraclass: Placentalia
- Order: Rodentia
- Superfamily: Ctenodactyloidea
- Genus: †Yongshengomys; Li & Meng, 2015
- Species: †Y. extensus

Binomial name
- †Yongshengomys extensus Li & Meng, 2015

Extinct genus of rodents

Yongshengomys is an extinct genus of ctenodactyloid that lived during the Middle Eocene.

== Distribution ==
Youngshengomys extensus is known from the Irdin Manha Formation of Inner Mongolia, China.
