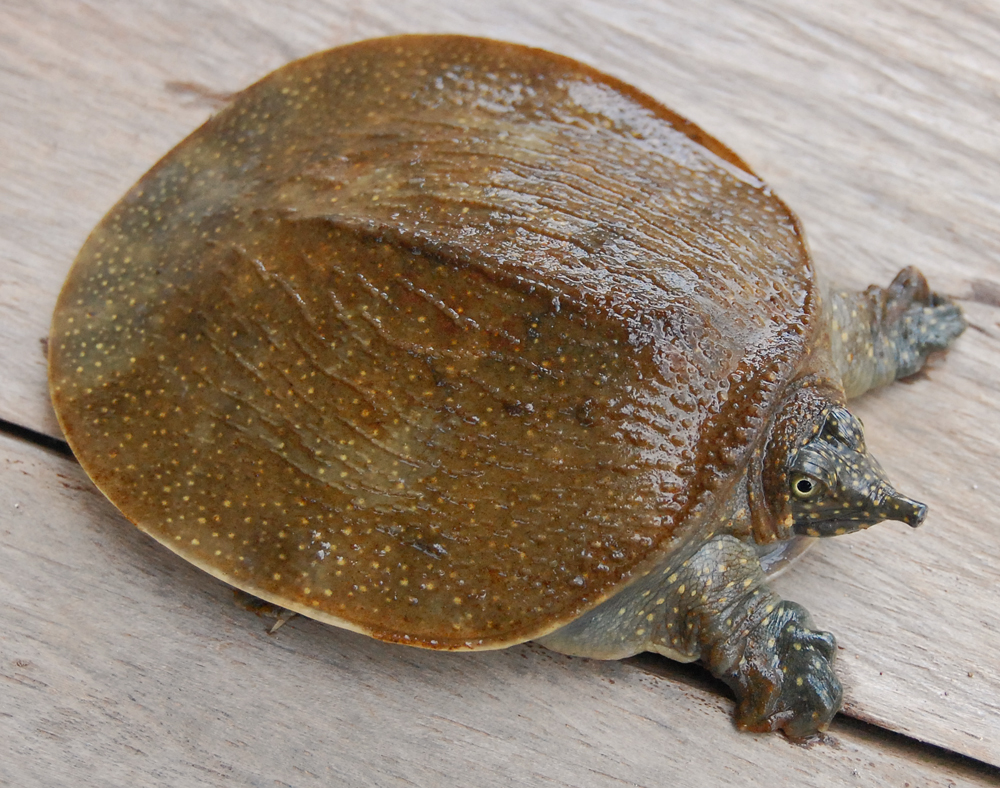
- Juvenile

Conservation status
- Vulnerable (IUCN 3.1)
- CITES Appendix II

Scientific classification
- Kingdom: Animalia
- Phylum: Chordata
- Class: Reptilia
- Order: Testudines
- Suborder: Cryptodira
- Family: Trionychidae
- Genus: Amyda
- Species: A. cartilaginea

Binomial name
- Amyda cartilaginea (Boddaert, 1770)

Synonyms
- List: Testudo cartilaginea Boddaert, 1770; Testudo membranacea Blumenbach, 1779; Testudo boddaerti Schneider, 1787; Testudo bodderti Schneider, 1787 (ex errore); Amyda javanica Schweigger, 1809 (nomen nudum); Trionyx javanicus Geoffroy Saint-Hilaire, 1809; Trionyx stellatus Geoffroy Saint-Hilaire, 1810(nomen novum); Aspidonectes javanicus Wagler, 1830; Gymnopus javanicus A.M.C. Duméril & Bibron, 1835; Gymnopus cartilaginea Cantor, 1847; Trionyx cariniferus Gray, 1856; Trionyx ornatus Gray, 1861; Aspilus cariniferus Gray, 1864; Aspilus ornatus Gray, 1864; Aspilus punctulatus Gray, 1864; Potamochelys stellatus Gray, 1864; Trionyx phayrei Theobald, 1868; Trionyx jeudi Gray, 1869; Aspilus javanicus Gray, 1873; Ida ornata Gray, 1873; Trionyx ephippium Theobald, 1875; Trionyx cartilagineus Boulenger, 1889; Trionyx phayrii Boulenger, 1889 (ex errore); Aspidonectes cartilagineus Baur, 1893; Aspidonectes phayrei Baur, 1893; Potamochelys cartilagineus O.P. Hay, 1904; Potamochelys javanicus O.P. Hay, 1904; Amyda cartilaginea Barbour, 1912; Amyda phayrii Barbour, 1912; Trionyx boddaertii Bourret, 1941 (ex errore); Trionyx carinifera Bourret, 1941; Trionyx cartilagneus Thelwall, 1971 (ex errore); Testudo boddaerta Auffenberg, 1974 (ex errore); Trionyx cartilaginosis Auffenberg, 1974 (ex errore); Trionyx cartilaginosus Auffenberg, 1974 (ex errore); Tryonyx cartilageneus Nutaphand, 1979 (ex errore); Trionyx cartilageneus Nutaphand, 1979; Trionyx cartlageneus Nutaphand, 1979 (ex errore); Trionyx nakornsrithammarajensis Nutaphand, 1979; Trionyx cartilaginous Chkhikvadze, 1987 (ex errore); Amyda nakornsrithammarajensis Ernst & Barbour, 1989; Amyda nakornsrithammarajensis Stubbs, 1989; Trionyx cartilageneus nakorn Nutaphand, 1990; Trionyx cartilageneus cartilageneus Nutaphand, 1990; Amyda cartilaginae Nöllert, 1992 (ex errore); Trionyx cartilagineus nakorn Obst, 1996; Trionix cartilagineus Richard, 1999

= Asiatic softshell turtle =

Species of turtle

The Asiatic softshell turtle or black-rayed softshell turtle (Amyda cartilaginea) is a species of softshell turtle in the Trionychidae family. Despite its name, it is not the only softshell turtle in Asia (most trionychines are Asian).

== Taxonomy ==
Formerly considered the only extant species within Amyda, a 2014 study found deep genetic divergence within this species and supported splitting it into three distinct species: A. cartilaginea sensu stricto, A. ornata or the Mainland Southeast Asian softshell turtle, and an undescribed species from Borneo. Both Amyda cartilaginea and Amyda ornata branch into further subspecies, while Amyda (unnamed) is a terminal clade in itself. Amyda cartilaginea's subspecies are: Amyda cartilaginea cartilaginea (located in E. Sunde, E. Borneo, Java, and Sulawesi) and Amyda cartilaginea maculosa (found in Sumatra and West Borneo).

Amyda cartilaginea cartilaginea exhibits the typical markings and overall look of Amyda cartilaginea (as it is the nominate), possessing "an abundance of yellow spots over the body, yellow-rimmed black ocelli on the carapace, black reticulation on a yellow-olive-brown ground color at the crown of the head". The unconfirmed candidate species, Amyda (unnamed), exhibits a "Saddle-blotched colouration"; the turtles in this clade all exhibit "a very similar dark carapacial mark".

== Geographic range ==
Amyda cartilaginea is found in Brunei, Indonesia (Bali, Java, Sumatra, and Kalimantan), Malaysia (Sabah, Sarawak), Singapore, and southern Thailand. It ranges from the Thai portion of the Malay Peninsula south throughout Island Southeast Asia. Populations in the Lesser Sundas, Moluccas, and Sulawesi are thought to be introduced or traded individuals.

== Physical description ==
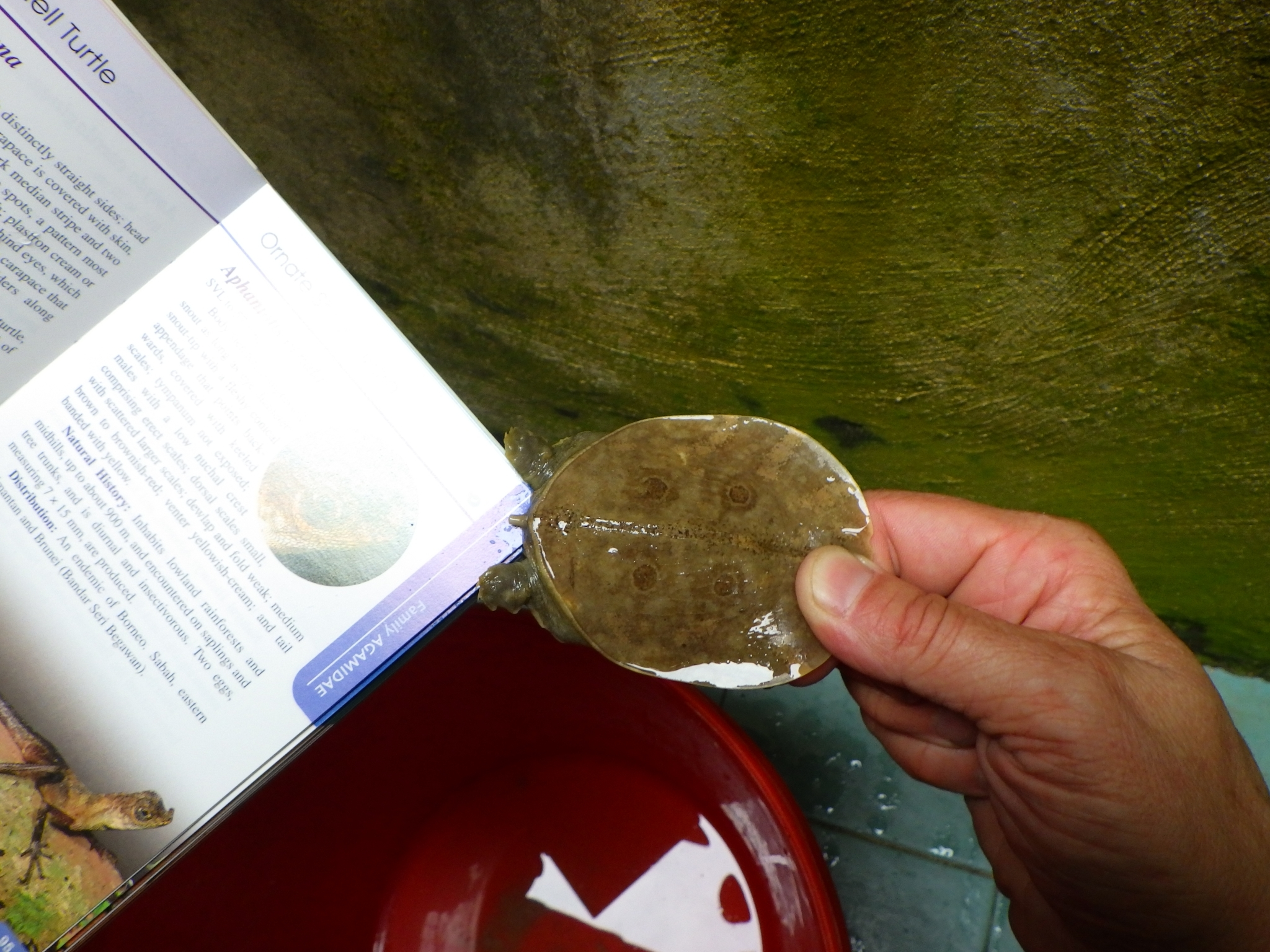
Small juvenile

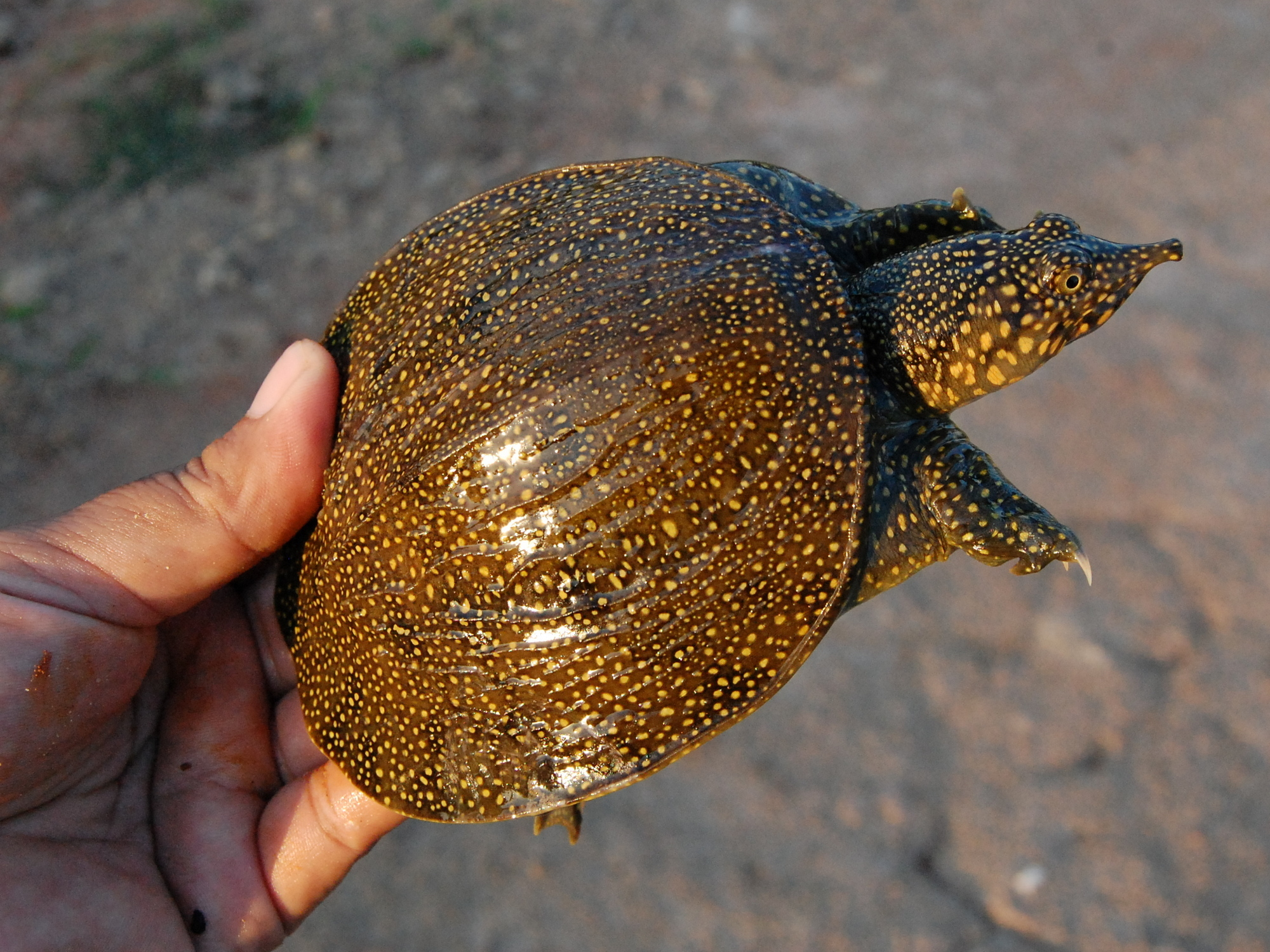
Larger juvenile

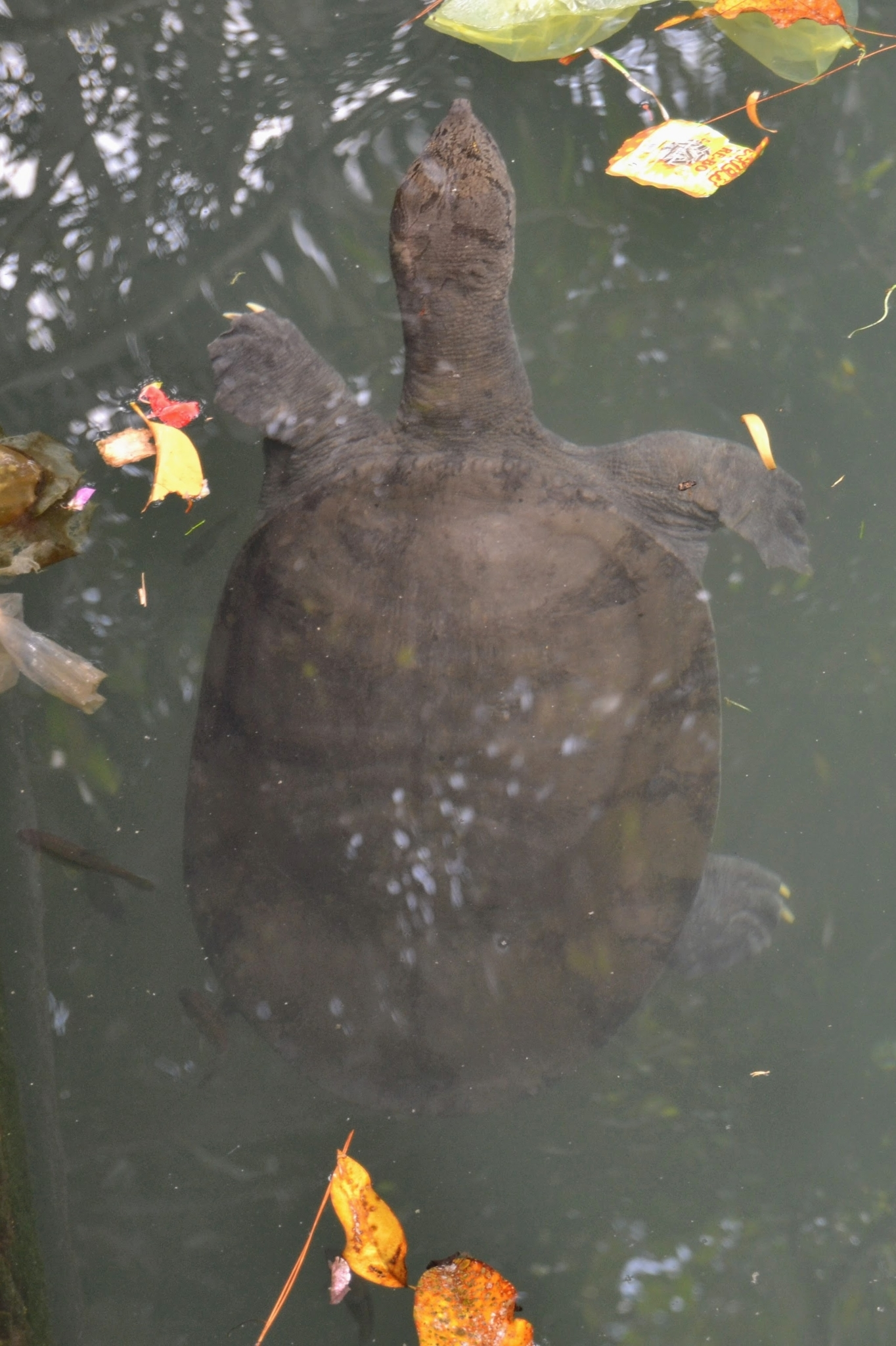
Adult

Amyda cartilaginea has a shell that grows from 70 to 80 cm (28 to 31 in) in length. The juvenile turtle's shell has a rough appearance; adults have a shell that is soft and leathery in texture. This turtle is average sized, growing to weigh between 15 and 25 kg (33 and 55 lb), with unconfirmed reports claiming that Amyda cartilaginea can grow to be as heavy as 105 kg (231 lb). Its carapace is oval in shape; on adult turtles its color ranges from a soft olive to green-brown. On juveniles, the carapace is dark brown or black, however this color fades with age. Yellow dots, and the occasional black spot, can be found on the shell, but these too fade as the turtle gets older. Its plastron is sexually dimorphic, appearing white in males and gray in females.

The head of Amyda cartilaginea can be black or brown. Its head typically displays yellow dots that sometimes appear to fuse together, creating elongated streaks. As the turtle ages, its nape region becomes white or gray. A trait that helps differentiate the Asiatic soft-shell turtle from other similar species is its noticeably elongated snout. This is an adaptation that, coupled with its great flexibility, aids the turtle in breathing when it has buried itself. Increased gas exchange, a result of an adaptation known as "pharyngeal breathing", allows the Asiatic soft-shell turtle to remain submerged in water for extended periods of time. Amyda cartilaginea has several permanent tubercles on its neck; these tubercles can appear yellow or black. The Asiatic soft-shell turtle's limbs also have yellow spots, but these are usually less in quantity and difficult to distinguish. Its feet are wide and flat, resembling paddles. As a final descriptive note, the males have longer and thicker tails than females.

== Habitat ==
Amyda cartilaginea can be found in tropical regions, freshwater habitats, rainforest terrestrial biomes, in the aquatic biomes of lakes, ponds, canals and lowland streams. It can be found in many locations throughout Asia, specifically in the following countries: Brunei, Bangladesh, Borneo, Cambodia, India, Indonesia, Laos, Malaysia, Myanmar, Sabah, Sarawak, Singapore, Thailand, and Vietnam. Amyda cartilaginea tends to favor wetlands; the Asiatic soft-shell can be found in marshes, swamps, and sizeable muddy rivers at lower elevations.

== Diet ==
The Asiatic softshell is an omnivore, meaning it will feed off of plants and animals when given the chance. It has the ability to stay under water for long periods of time because of the gill like structure it possesses. This gives Amyda cartilaginea the ability to sneak up on prey. The Asiatic softshell feeds on a variety of foods, including fish, insects, worms, eggs, amphibians, crustaceans and even at times bird carcasses. When animal prey is scarce, it eats berries, nuts, and plant seeds. Amyda cartilaginea specifically prefers the seeds of marsh plants. It also occasionally feeds on rubber tree seeds. As with most animals, as the specific habitat of each turtle changes, its specific diet also slightly changes. The Asiatic softshell turtle does most of its hunting and foraging nocturnally.

== Breeding behavior ==
Amyda cartilaginea is polygynangrous, meaning each female mates with several different males and males mate with several different females. The mating season is during the hot-dry season, which lasts from April to September. However, this may vary based on the specific geographic location of each turtle. Copulation happens underwater with the male using its claws to hold the upper shell of the female. Breeding typically occurs three to four times per year.

Females reach sexual maturity at eight to ten years, while males reach sexual maturity at four to five years. Amyda cartilaginea is oviparous and builds protective nests at night. The incubation period ranges from 18 to 20 weeks, with the size of each clutch ranging from one to 30 eggs. Clutch size is highly dependent on the geographical location and the size of the turtles. Hatchling sizes range from 32 to 49, which is also dependent on the size and location of the Amyda cartilaginea. The nests of the Asiatic soft-shell are built in damp, sandy areas built close to mud banks; the mother leaves her eggs after building a safe environment for them.

== Predators and parasites ==
Natural predators are predators from the prey's natural range. Natural predators of Amyda cartilaginea are the smooth-coated otter and the tiger. Natural predators of the turtle's eggs are monitor lizards, crows, snakes, eagles, and wild pigs. Non-natural predators of adult Asiatic soft-shells and their eggs are humans. Although the most obvious threats to Amyda cartilaginea are large animals, they can be infected by many small and microscopic freshwater organisms/parasites. Known species parasitic to Amyda cartilaginea are, bacteria: Edwardsiella tarda and Aeromonas veronii; fungus: Saprolegnia and ectoparasitic worm: Pseudocalceostoma. Larger parasites to this turtle are leeches and nematodes species: Monhysterides jambiensis and Spiroxys sumatraensis.

== Life cycle ==
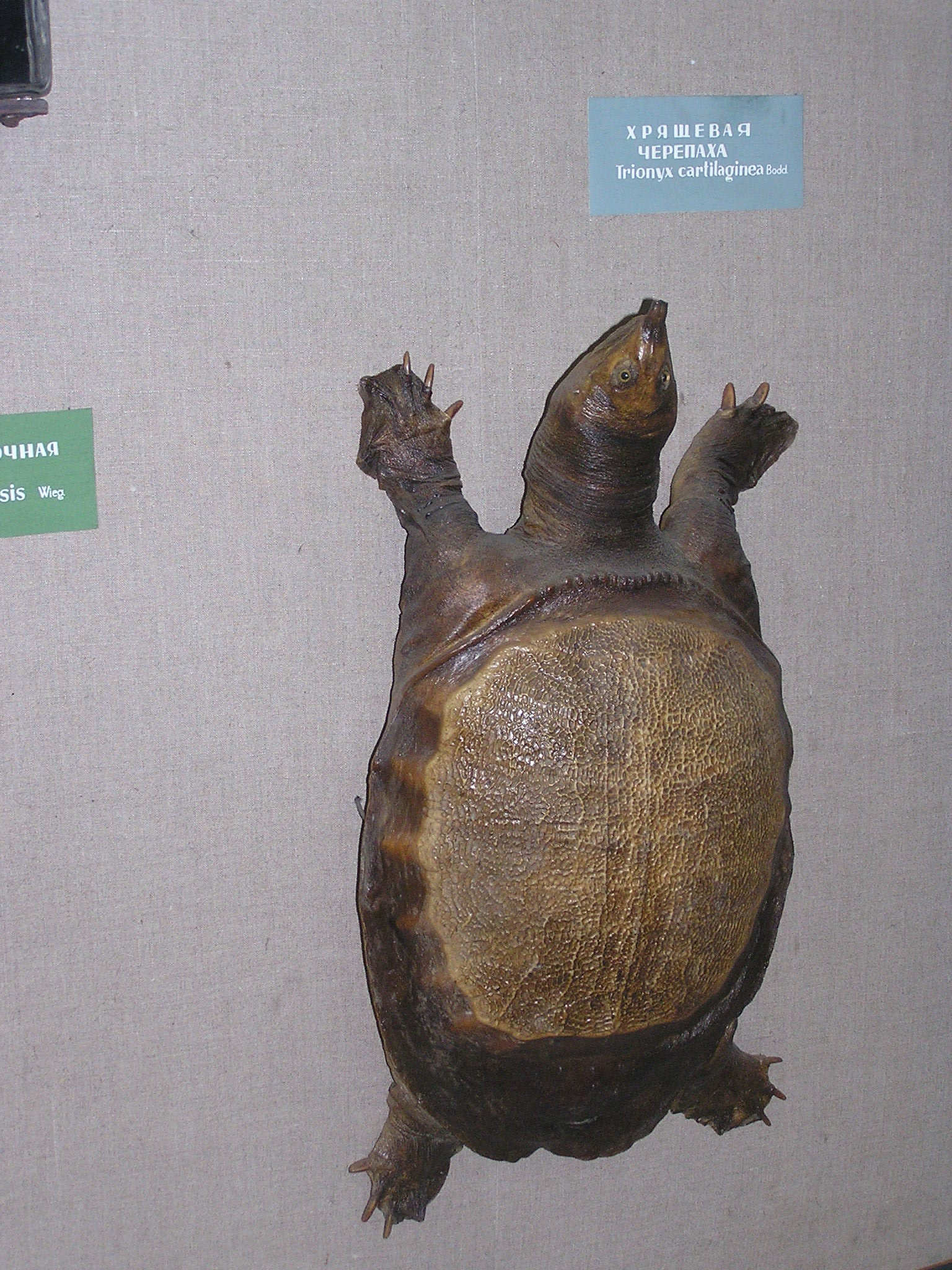
Amyda cartilaginea (Trionyx cartilagineus) in a Saint Petersburg museum

The Asiatic soft shelled turtle goes through a life cycle similar to many other turtles around the world. It begins its life by hatching from a clutch of eggs laid in sand along a body of water. This clutch can range in size from four to eight eggs depending on the size and age of the female that laid the clutch. On average, the incubation period for Amyda cartilaginea ranges between 130 and 140 days. However, the incubation period is greatly dependent on climate; not only for the rate of incubation, but also the sex of the majority of these turtles. Temperature has a great influence on what sex the turtle will become, females are typically born at around 30 degrees Celsius and males at 25 degrees Celsius. Once hatched, these young turtles must race to the water in order to prevent being eaten. Monitor lizards along with crows and serpent eagles are known to eat these young turtles.

The juvenile turtles that escape these early threats will most likely continue to grow and develop into sexually reproducing adults. For females this takes around 20 months. Once sexually mature, the Asiatic soft-shell can produce up to four clutches of eggs a year, however this depends on how temperate the year had been (as the mating cycles of these turtles relies on the dry season since this is the only times the river banks are exposed enough for them to lay their eggs). Although it is understood that Asiatic soft-shell turtles can live very long lives, it is not yet understood exactly how long their life cycle lasts. This is partially due to the fact that many Asiatic soft-shells are caught as a food source, the larger (and thus older) turtles being more desirable since they produce more meat.

== Conservation ==
The Asiatic softshell turtle is found in wetlands and rivers, mostly in different parts of Asia. In this region, they are exploited for trade and harvested for food. With business developing that rely on the exploitation of Amyda cartilaginea, the population of this species has declined. There is more worry now than ever about the danger of the Asiatic soft-shell's exploitation. In fact, it is hard to say exactly how much longer this species will be around.

== Exploitation ==
Amyda cartilaginea is key to trading business in the areas it resides in, such as Asia and India. It are one of the few species harvested where they naturally reside, providing food for the people in the surrounding areas. They are an important food in the Sarawak culture. These areas have a sparse variety of food. However, the exploitation and trade of Amyda cartilaginea may be hurting the turtle's population. Millions of Asiatic soft-shells are shipped around these regions every day, causing more to be shipped than what is produced in their habitat. The United States has some regions where these turtles reside, and used to participate in trade of the Asiatic soft-shell as well. However, once this trade was proven to have some danger on the turtle's population, laws were put in place to stop trading Amyda cartilaginea in the United States. Later on, other countries began to do this as well.

== Endangerment ==
As the trade for this species grows, the number of turtles remaining drops. The Asiatic softshell turtle is now on the IUCN Red List as "Vulnerable", meaning it is not yet extinct, but is at the risk of becoming so. Laws have been put in place to help slow down the trading of these turtles or even stop it completely to protect this species from extinction. However, there aren't any against harvesting Amyda cartilaginea for food. Since selling for human consumption is one of biggest markets these turtles are sold in, the laws put in place have made only a slight difference in the Asiatic soft-shell's population drop. Harvesting is done mostly locally, since it allows the turtle's meat to be made freshly, and is quickly available to residents. Trading to other countries is done to provide food, however Amyda cartilaginea is also used for medicinal purposes.

== Social behavior ==
Amyda cartelgenea has different ways of communicating. Its snout is used for hunting, smelling predators, and breathing. The Asiatic soft-shell also uses tactile and chemical communication. Its snout is used for hunting, smelling predators, and breathing. This species has different ways of communicating, which include tactile and chemical communication. Amyda cartilaginea has different kinds of perception channels such as visual, tactile, and vibration. It is largely solitary except during breeding. Asiatic soft-shells bury themselves for both protection and hunting; when a threat is perceived, the Asiatic soft-shell has the tendency to become aggressive. It can give off a painful bite, although it usually does not cause significant damage. Amyda cartilaginea buries itself under mud to protect itself. It has minimal interaction with humans, and does not bond with them. Therefore, the Asiatic soft-shelled turtle would not make a suitable pet and subsequently has not been domesticated. Amyda cartilaginea does not have very good eyesight. Given its habitat (canals, streams, ponds), it has fuzzy vision.
