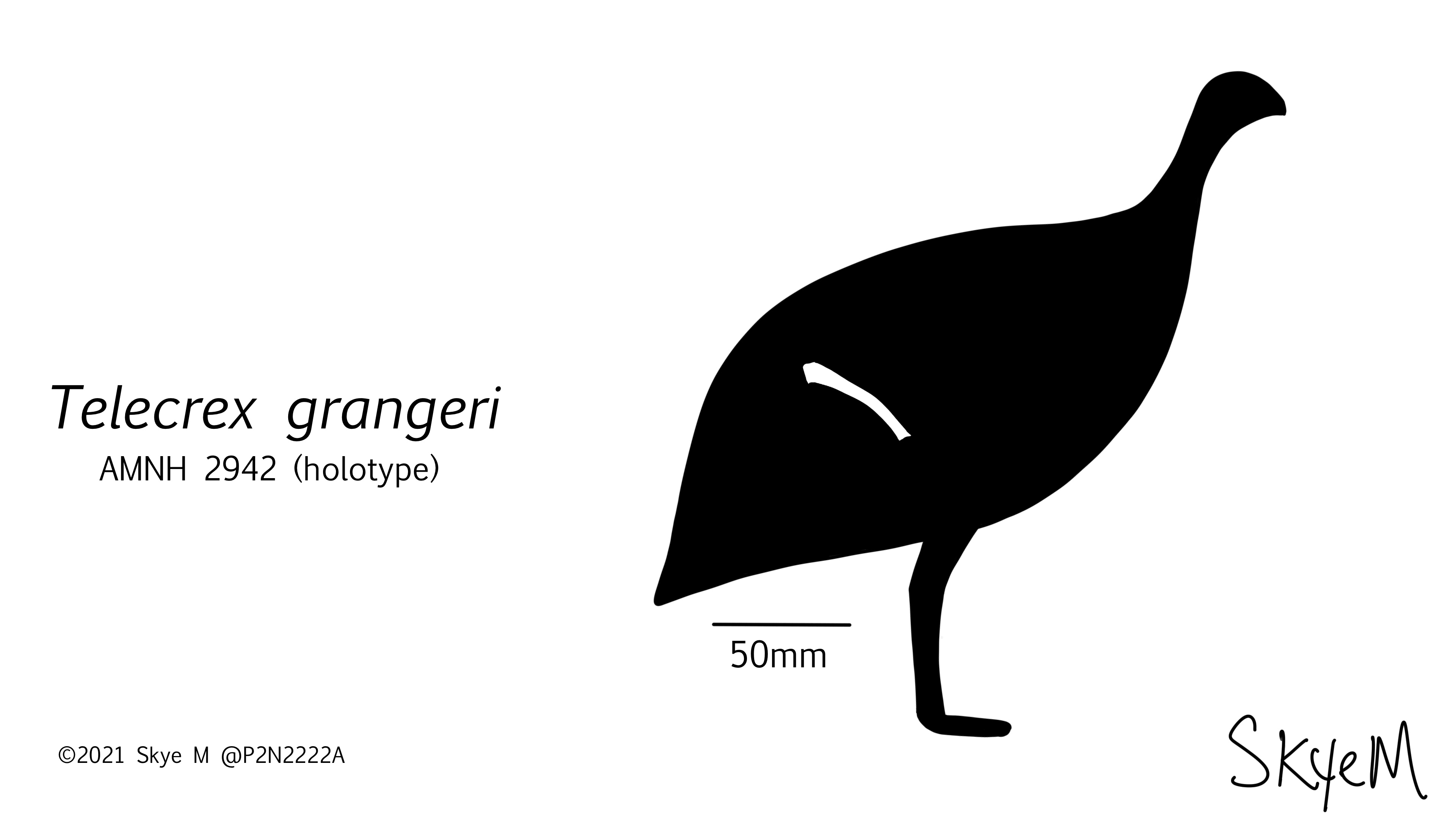
- Artist's rendition of the silhouette of T. grangeri

Scientific classification
- Kingdom: Animalia
- Phylum: Chordata
- Class: Aves
- Order: Galliformes
- Superfamily: Phasianoidea
- Family: Numididae
- Genus: †Telecrex; Wetmore, 1934

Species
- †Telecrex grangeri; †Telecrex peregrinus

= Telecrex =

Telecrex Temporal range: Eocene

Extinct genus of birds

Telecrex is an extinct genus of birds related to guineafowl, containing two species, Telecrex grangeri (the type species) and Telecrex peregrinus. T. grangeri is known from a single partial femur from Eocene deposits in Inner Mongolia, while T. peregrinus was found in France.

== Taxonomy ==
The holotype and only known specimen of Telecrex grangeri, AMNH 2942, is a partial right femur collected from the Eocene Irdin Manha Formation. The distal end and part of the trochanter are missing. The new genus Telecrex was described by Wetmore in 1934 and assigned to the Rallidae. In 1974, the holotype was reexamined by Storrs Olson, who concluded that it was in fact an early relative of guineafowl, a family previously only known from Africa and Europe.

The holotype of Telecrex peregrinus, NHMW 1988/28/1 was collected near Lalbenque in Lot, France at some point in the nineteenth century and described as a new species by Mlíkovský in 1986. A second specimen from the same deposit, NHMW 1988/28/2 was also referred to this species.

Telecrex peregrinus was larger in size than Telecrex grangeri.
