= Notoparamys =

Notoparamys Temporal range: Ypresian

Scientific classification
- Kingdom: Animalia
- Phylum: Chordata
- Class: Mammalia
- Order: Rodentia
- Family: †Paramyidae
- Subfamily: †Paramyinae
- Genus: †Notoparamys; Korth, 1984

Type species
- Notoparamys arctios Korth, 1984

Other species
- Notoparamys blochi Gunnell et al., 2016; Notoparamys costilloi Wood, 1962

Notoparamys is an extinct genus of paramyine rodent that lived in North America during the Wasatchian.

== Description ==
Notoparamys possessed a midbrain partially exposed between the cerebellum and cerebrum but lacked visible rostral colliculi. The incisor enamel of Notoparamys costilloi was pauciserial. The mandibular fourth premolar of N. costilloi had a pattern of Hunter-Schreger bands known as an S-type schmelzmuster. Occlusion in N. costilloi was characterised by mesiolingual movement of the mandibular molars across the maxillary ones in a similar fashion to the closely related Paramys.
