= Erenlagus =

Erenlagus Temporal range: Middle Eocene

Scientific classification
- Kingdom: Animalia
- Phylum: Chordata
- Class: Mammalia
- Order: Lagomorpha
- Genus: †Erenlagus
- Species: †E. anielae

Binomial name
- †Erenlagus anielae Fostowicz-Frelik & Li, 2014

Extinct genus of basal lagomorph

Erenlagus is an extinct genus of basal lagomorph that lived during the Middle Eocene.

== Distribution ==
Erenlagus anielae is known from the Irdin Manha Formation of China.
