= Corbarimys cezannei =

Scientific classification
- Kingdom: Animalia
- Phylum: Chordata
- Class: Mammalia
- Order: Rodentia
- Family: †Paramyidae
- Genus: †Corbarimys
- Species: †C. cezannei

Binomial name
- †Corbarimys cezannei (Hartenberger, 1987)

Synonyms
- †Pseudoparamys cezannei Hartenberger, 1987

Extinct species of rodent

Corbarimys cezannei, formerly Pseudoparamys cezannei, is a species of extinct rodent in family Ischyromyidae. It is named after French Post-Impressionist painter Paul Cézanne.

== See also ==
- List of organisms named after famous people (born 1800–1899)
