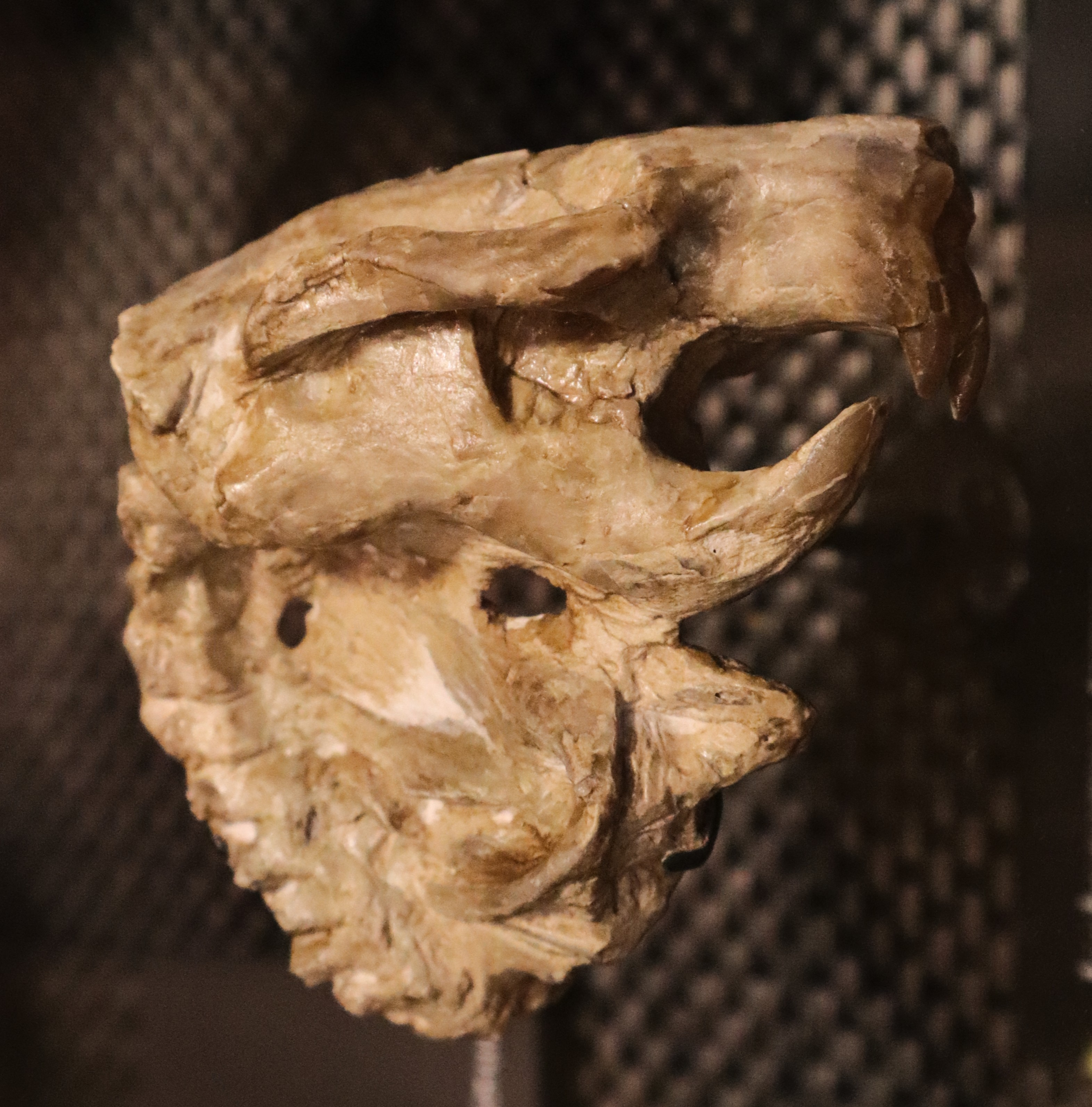
- Skull and partial skeleton of I. typus, Beneski Museum of Natural History

Scientific classification
- Kingdom: Animalia
- Phylum: Chordata
- Class: Mammalia
- Order: Rodentia
- Suborder: Sciuromorpha
- Infraorder: Protrogomorpha
- Family: †Ischyromyidae
- Genus: †Ischyromys; Leidy, 1856

Species
- I. typus (type); I. blacki; I. brevidens; I. douglassi; I. junctus; I. veterior

= Ischyromys =

Ischyromys Temporal range: Early Eocene–Early Oligocene

Extinct genus of rodents

Ischyromys is an extinct genus of rodent from North America.

== Description ==
The 60 cm (2 ft) long creature is one of the oldest rodents known. It resembled a mouse and already had characteristic rodent incisors. Ischyromys's hind legs were longer than the forelegs, which could be used for other means than walking. Unlike most other mammals of its time, Ischyromys was probably arboreal (along with its relative Paramys). It was a well-adapted climber that gradually beat out competition from rodent-like arboreal plesiadapiform primates.

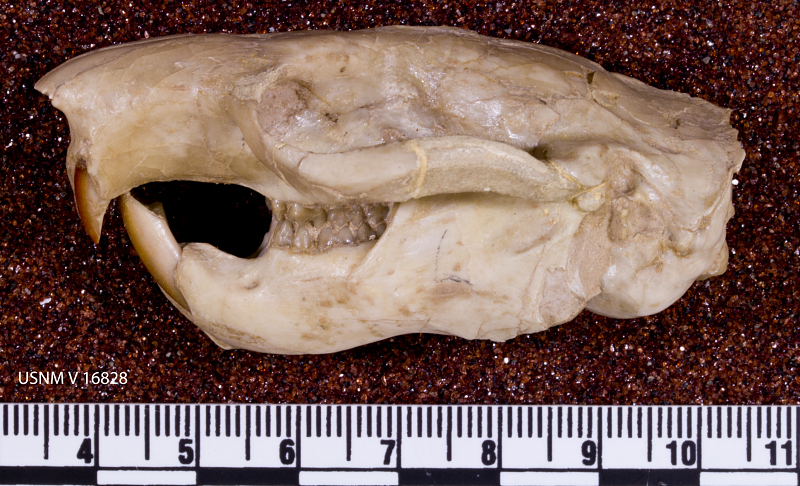
Skull of I. typus

The brain of I. typus was characterised by an exposed midbrain. Additionally, it had less developed olfactory bulbs as compared to plesiadapiforms, suggesting that early rodents relied less on their sense of smell as compared to primatomorphs and their relatives.
