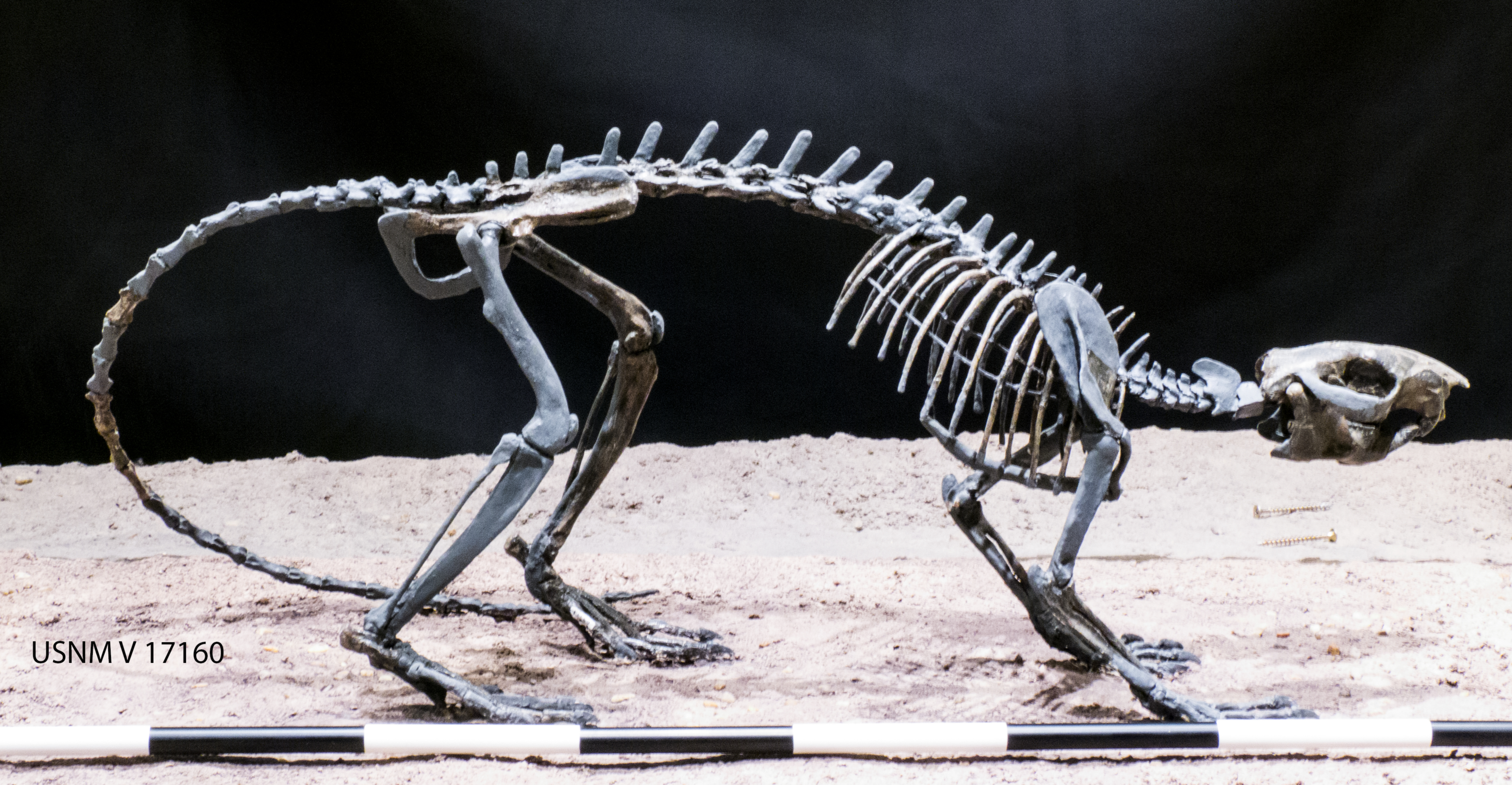
- USNM V 17160, a skeleton of P. robustus (formerly Ischyrotomus oweni)

Scientific classification
- Kingdom: Animalia
- Phylum: Chordata
- Class: Mammalia
- Order: Rodentia
- Suborder: Sciuromorpha
- Infraorder: Protrogomorpha
- Family: †Ischyromyidae
- Genus: †Pseudotomus; Cope, 1872

Type species
- Pseudotomus hians Cope, 1872

Species
- P. hians (type) Cope, 1872; P. californicus (Wilson, 1940); P. eugenei (Burke, 1935); P. horribilis (Wood, 1962); P. johanniculi (Wood, 1974); P. littoralis (Wilson, 1949); P. petersoni (Matthew, 1910); P. robustus (Marsh, 1872); P. timmys Storer, 1988

Synonyms
- Ischyrotomus Matthew, 1910

= Pseudotomus =

Pseudotomus Temporal range: Eocene

Extinct genus of rodents

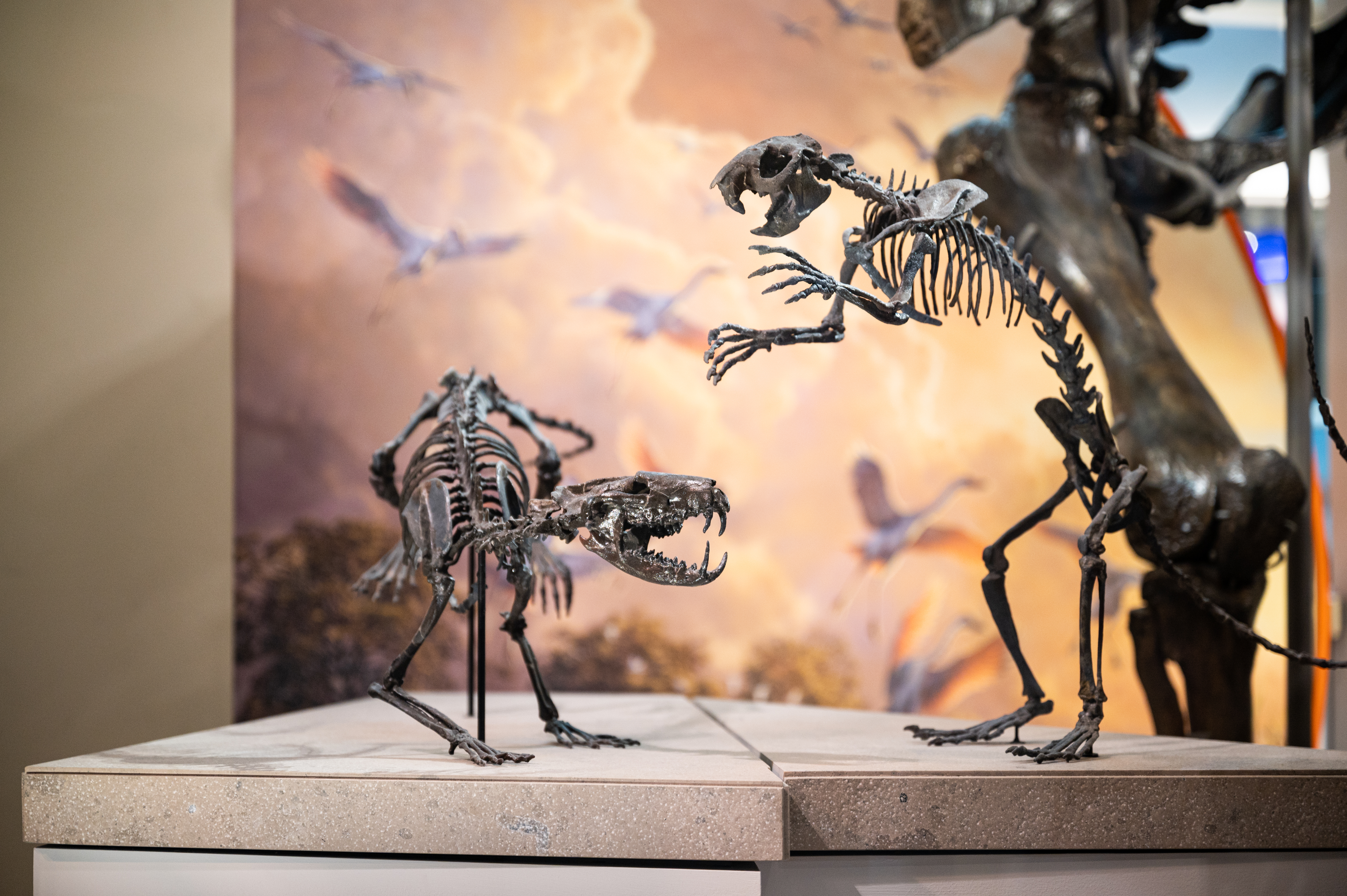
Skeletons of Sinopa (left) and "Ischyrotomus oweni" (Pseudotomus robustus, right) mounted in fighting postures at the National Museum of Natural History

Pseudotomus is an extinct genus of ischyromyid rodent from Eocene North America. Pseudotomus was a large early rodent with habits similar to ground squirrels. It belongs to the tribe Manitshini and the subfamily Paramyinae.

"Ischyrotomus" is a junior synonym of Pseudotomus, with Ischyrotomus oweni as a synonym of Pseudotomus robustus in particular.
