= Yakamys =

Yakamys Temporal range: 35–34 Ma

Scientific classification
- Kingdom: Animalia
- Phylum: Chordata
- Class: Mammalia
- Order: Rodentia
- Family: †Ischyromyidae
- Genus: †Yakamys; Chaimanee et al.,2026

Species
- †Yakamys sirindhornae

Extinct species of giant rodent

Yakamys sirindhornae is an extinct giant rodent originally found in what is now the Krabi Province of Thailand, identified from fossils found in a lignite bed in the Bang Mark Pit of the Krabi lignite mine. The fossils are estimated to be 34 million years old.

== Etymology ==
The genus name, Yakamys, is a combination of "yak", the Thai word for giant, and "mys", the Greek word for mouse or rat. The species name honors Maha Chakri Sirindhorn, Princess Royal, to recognize her support for science and palaeontological research in Thailand.

== Size ==
Using several methods that use tooth measurements to calculate body mass, the researchers' results suggest that this species weighed approximately 30 kg (or 66 lbs). This makes it roughly twice as heavy as other rodents known from the same time period, including Hulgana.

== Discovery ==
Yakamys sirindhornae was originally identified from two large, fossilized teeth, one lower second molar and one lower incisor. This discovery was made through an international collaboration of scientists from McGill University, Thailand's Department of Mineral Resources, and some French research organizations, including the French National Centre for Scientific Research and Université de Poitiers, who are investigating ancient mammals in the Krabi Basin of Thailand.
