= List of largest rodents =

This is a list of the largest rodents.

Rank	Common name	Scientific name	Status	Maximum body mass [kg (lb)]	Image	Notes
1		Josephoartigasia monesi	Fossil	1,250 kg (2,760 lb)		
2		Phoberomys pattersoni	Fossil	550–700 kg (1,210–1,540 lb)		
3	Greater capybara	Hydrochoerus hydrochaeris	Extant	91.2 kg (201 lb)		
4	North American beaver	Castor canadensis	Extant	50 kg (110 lb)		
5	Eurasian beaver	Castor fiber	Extant	30 kg (66 lb)		
6	Cape porcupine	Hystrix africaeaustralis	Extant	30 kg (66 lb)		
7		Yakamys sirindhornae	Fossil	30 kg (66 lb)		
8	Lesser capybara	Hydrochoerus isthmius	Extant	28 kg (62 lb)		
9	Crested porcupine	Hystrix cristata	Extant	27 kg (60 lb)		
10	North American porcupine	Erethizon dorsatum	Extant	18 kg (40 lb)		
11	Indian crested porcupine	Hystrix indica	Extant	18 kg (40 lb)		
12	Coypu	Myocastor coypus	Extant	17 kg (37 lb)		
13	Patagonian mara	Dolichotis patagonum	Extant	16 kg (35 lb)		
14	Pacarana	Dinomys branickii	Extant	15 kg (33 lb)		
15	Paca	Cuniculus paca	Extant	6–14 kg (13–31 lb)		

== See also ==
- List of largest mammals
