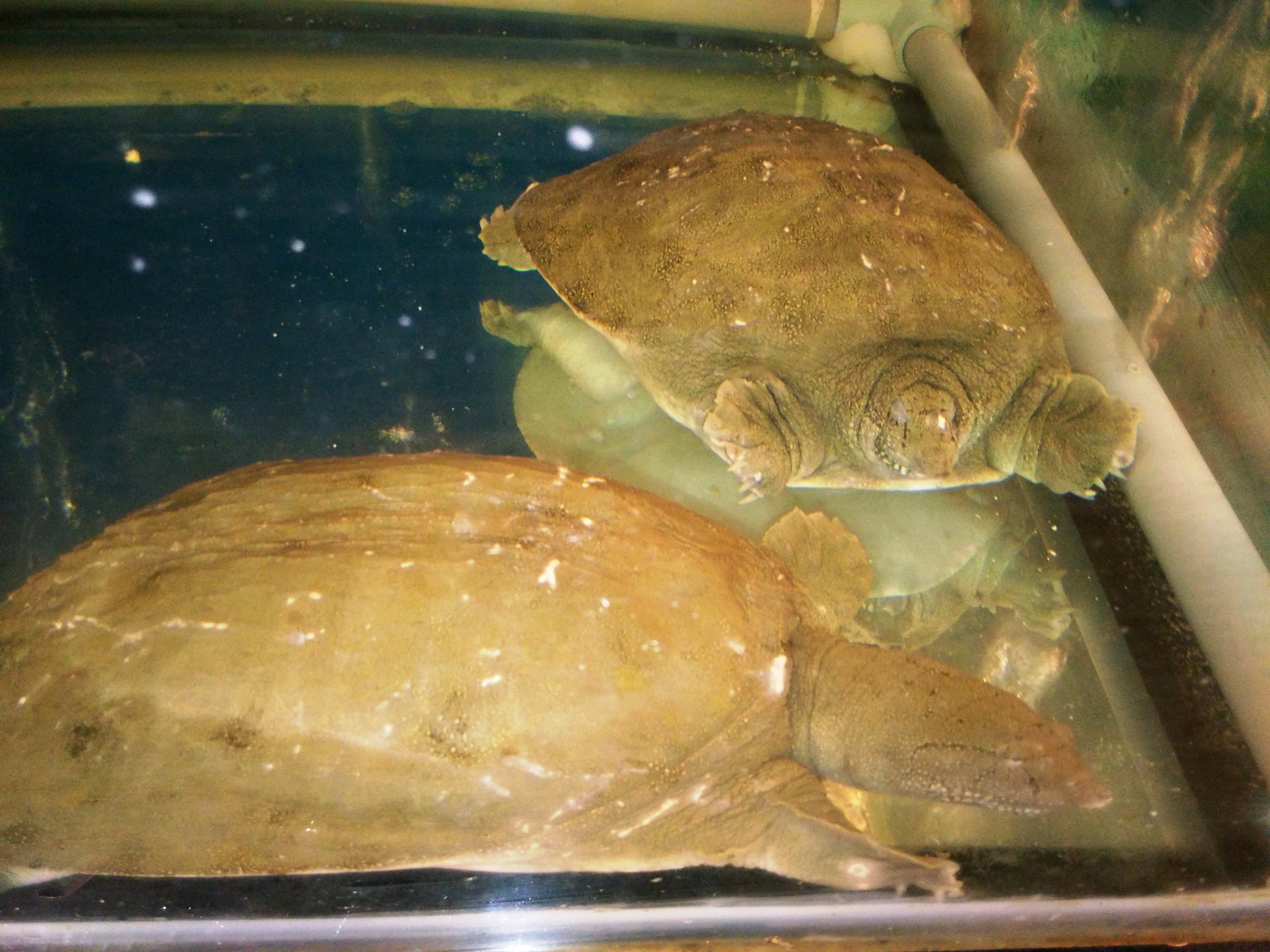

Conservation status
- CITES Appendix II (CITES)

Scientific classification
- Domain: Eukaryota
- Kingdom: Animalia
- Phylum: Chordata
- Class: Reptilia
- Order: Testudines
- Suborder: Cryptodira
- Family: Trionychidae
- Genus: Amyda
- Species: A. ornata

Binomial name
- Amyda ornata (Gray, 1861)

Synonyms
- Aspilus ornatus Amyda cartilaginea ornata

= Southeast Asian softshell turtle =

Species of softshell turtle

The Southeast Asian softshell turtle (Amyda ornata) is a species of softshell turtle in the family Trionychidae.

== Taxonomy ==
It was formerly considered a subspecies of the Asiatic softshell turtle (A. cartilaginea), which is now thought to be restricted to the Malay Peninsula and the Malay Archipelago. A 2014 phylogenetic study found both to be distinct species from one another. The Reptile Database and Turtle Taxonomy Working Group also consider both to be distinct species.

There are two subspecies:

- A. o. ornata (Gray, 1861) – Thailand, Laos, Vietnam, Cambodia
- A. o. phayrei (Theobald, 1868) – India, Bangladesh, Myanmar, Thailand

An undescribed subspecies is also known from Bangladesh, though the TTWG classifies it within A. o. phayrei.

== Distribution ==
The species is found throughout much of Mainland Southeast Asia, and ranges from northwestern India south to southern Myanmar and east to Vietnam.

== Description ==
Compared to A. cartilaginea, A. ornata is of an "arrow headed form" and has a "lighter base color and a more diffuse yellow spotting, which is 'usually restricted to the cheeks, there are no ocelli but black dots may be present on the carapace, the nuchal tubercles are always weakly developed and the animals always show three (or rarely two) converging black lines on the head'". Along with Amyda ornata subspecies (unnamed) from Bangladesh and Amyda ornata phayrei, Amyda ornata ornata's "morphology matches the turtles studied by Kuchling et al. 2004". In addition, Amyda ornata subspecies (unnamed) has "a rather uniform pale color and very large tubercles in the nuchal and back region of the carapace".

== Status ==
The IUCN Red List presently groups A. ornata with A. cartilaginea, and has found them to be Vulnerable due to overexploitation for consumption. A provisional assessment of A. ornata as a distinct species has also found it to qualify for a Vulnerable status.
