= Asiomys =

Asiomys Temporal range: Middle Eocene

Scientific classification
- Kingdom: Animalia
- Phylum: Chordata
- Class: Mammalia
- Infraclass: Placentalia
- Order: Rodentia
- Family: †Ischyromyidae
- Genus: †Asiomys; Qi, 1987
- Species: †A. dawsoni

Binomial name
- †Asiomys dawsoni Qi, 1987

Extinct genus of rodents

Asiomys is an extinct genus of ischyromyid rodent that lived during the Eocene epoch.

== Distribution ==
Asiomys dawsoni is known from fossils discovered in the Irdin Manha Formation of Inner Mongolia, China.
