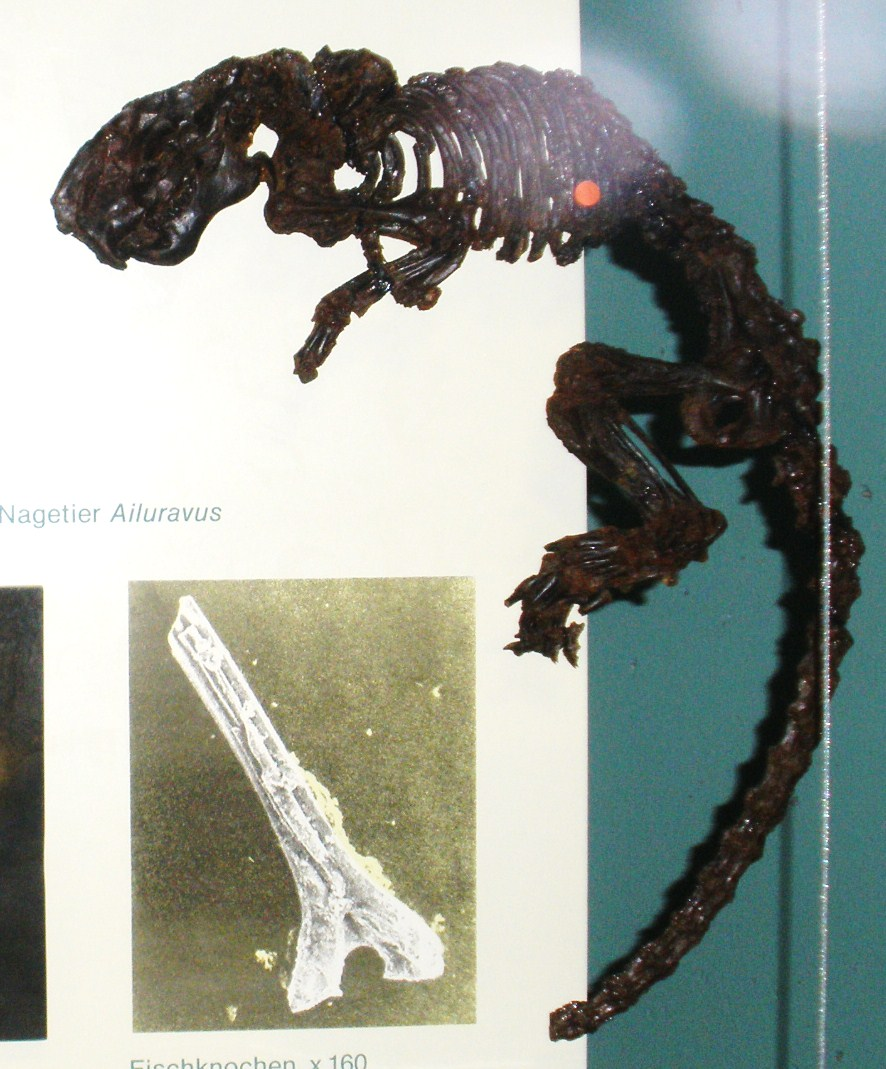
- Ailuravus macrurus skeleton

Scientific classification
- Kingdom: Animalia
- Phylum: Chordata
- Class: Mammalia
- Infraclass: Placentalia
- Order: Rodentia
- Suborder: Sciuromorpha
- Infraorder: Protrogomorpha
- Family: †Ischyromyidae
- Subfamily: †Ailuravinae
- Genus: †Ailuravus; Rütimeyer, 1891

Species
- Ailuravus macrurus Weitzel, 1949; Ailuravus michauxi; Ailuravus mitchelli; Ailuravus picteti; Ailuravus stehlinschaubi

= Ailuravus =

Ailuravus Temporal range: 48.6–37.2 Ma

Extinct genus of rodents

Ailuravus is a genus of prehistoric rodents in the family Ischyromyidae.

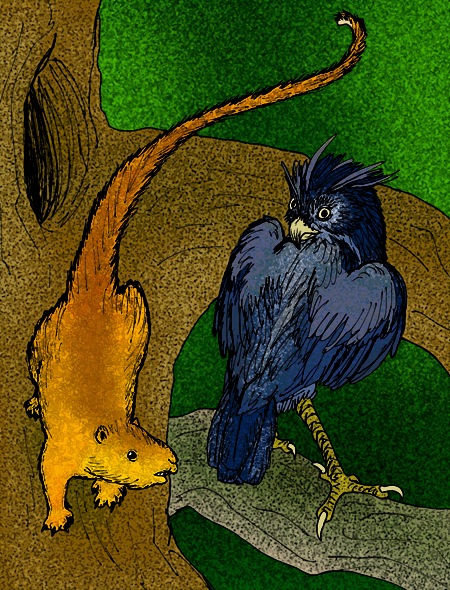
Ailuravus macrurus and Strigogyps sapea

Ailuravus macrurus ("big-tailed cat-ancestor") was a primitive, squirrel-like rodent, one of the earliest known rodents, from the Messel pit Lagerstätte, in Germany. It lived during the Eocene of Europe, in forests, and may have been arboreal.
