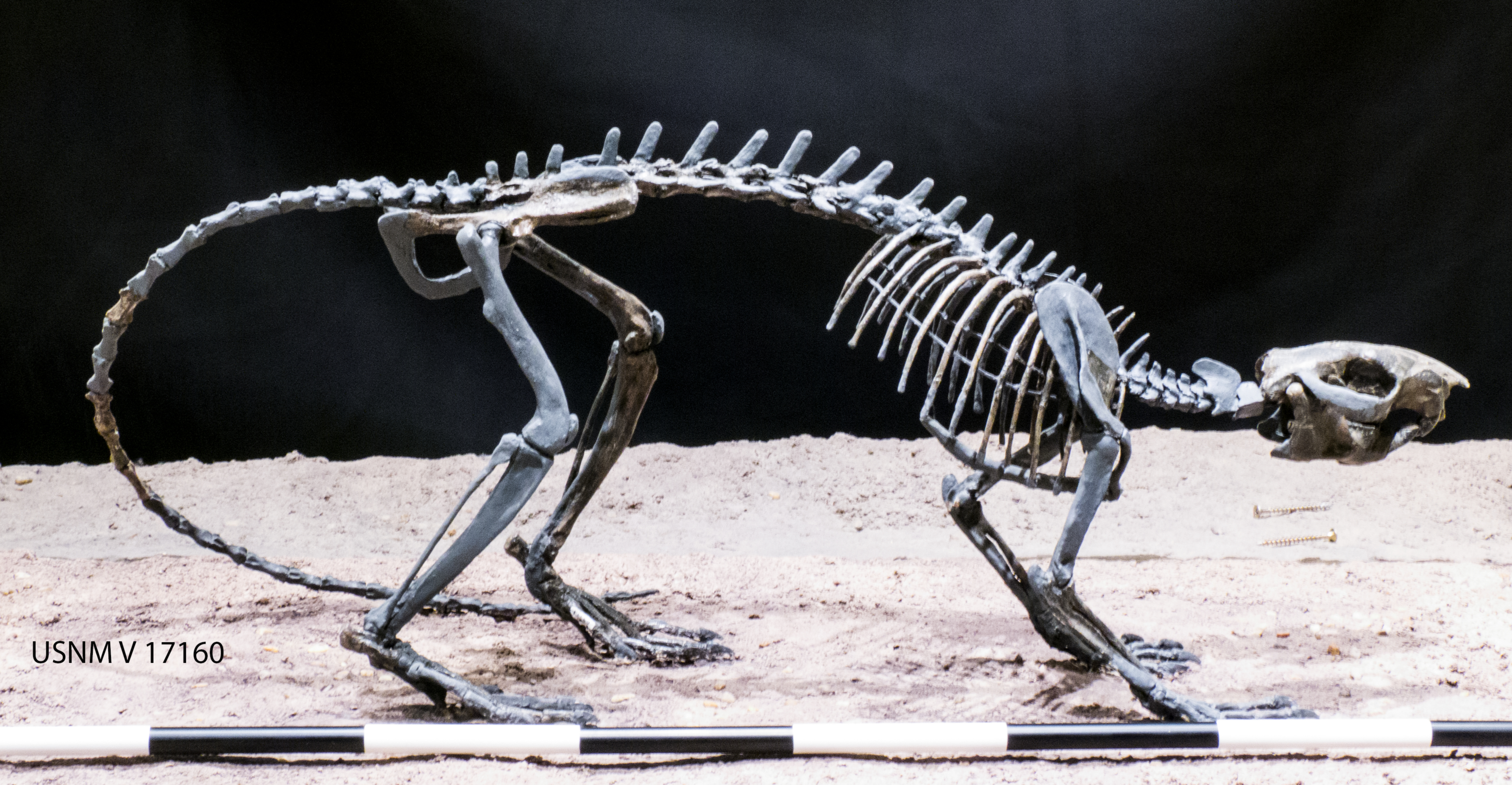
- Skeleton of Pseudotomus robustus at the National Museum of Natural History

Scientific classification
- Kingdom: Animalia
- Phylum: Chordata
- Class: Mammalia
- Order: Rodentia
- Suborder: Sciuromorpha
- Infraorder: Protrogomorpha
- Family: †Ischyromyidae; Alston, 1876

Subfamilies
- Ailuravinae; Ischyromyinae; Microparamyinae?; Paramyinae; Reithroparamyinae

= Ischyromyidae =

Ischyromyidae Temporal range: late Paleocene to mid-Oligocene

Extinct family of rodents

Ischyromyidae is an extinct family of rodents from the late Paleocene to mid-Oligocene of North America, Asia, Europe, and possibly Africa. Ischyromyids include some of the oldest rodents in the fossil record, and they may be ancestral to one or more modern rodent families. They were diverse and widespread, occupying many terrestrial niches held today by rodents such as mice, rats, and ground squirrels. The earliest ischyromyids are from the Clarkforkian NALMA and the last are from the Whitneyan. Some ischyromyid subfamilies, such as Paramyinae and Reithroparamyinae, are sometimes raised to the level of their own families (Paramyidae and Reithroparamyidae).

== Description ==
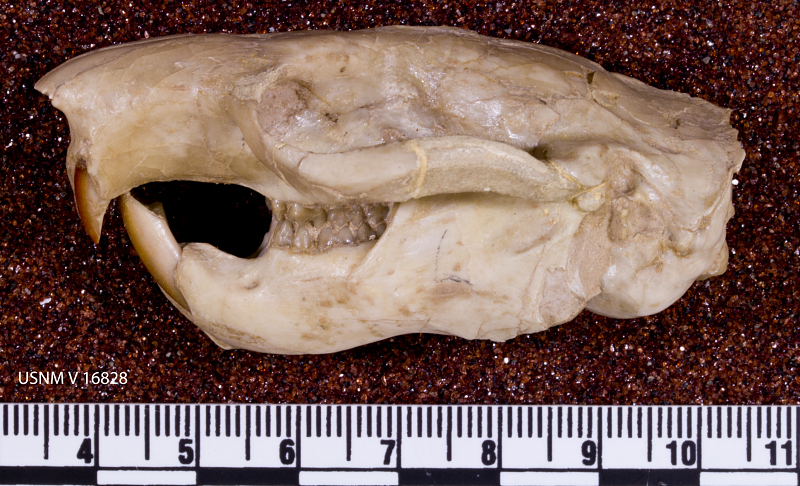
Skull of Ischyromys typus

Ischyromyids have low, strongly-built skulls, with both the snout and braincase relatively long compared to more recent rodents. Many additional traits are distinct from recent rodents: the nasal bones (on the top of the snout) form a tapering extension onto the forehead, the infraorbital foramen is small, and the cranium's masseter attachment only occupies the underside of the zygomatic arch.

The lower jaw is squirrel-like, with a tall coronoid process and a masseteric fossa (excavation for the masseter muscle) which extends as far forward as the first or second molar. The angular process of the mandible is usually in the same plane as the incisors, a sciurognathous condition.

Ischyromyids have a dental formula of 1.0.2.31.0.1.3. Lower cheek teeth are longer (from front-to-back) than wide, and upper cheek teeth are wider than long. Ischyromyid cheek teeth are often described as "rhomboid" in profile. Rodents in this family retain distinct bulbous cusps on their low, brachydont cheek teeth. There are only a few instances of lophs (blade-like crests for shredding plant material). Some species have crenulated (wrinkled) or pitted enamel, but most have smooth enamel.

== Paleoecology ==
=== Lifestyle ===
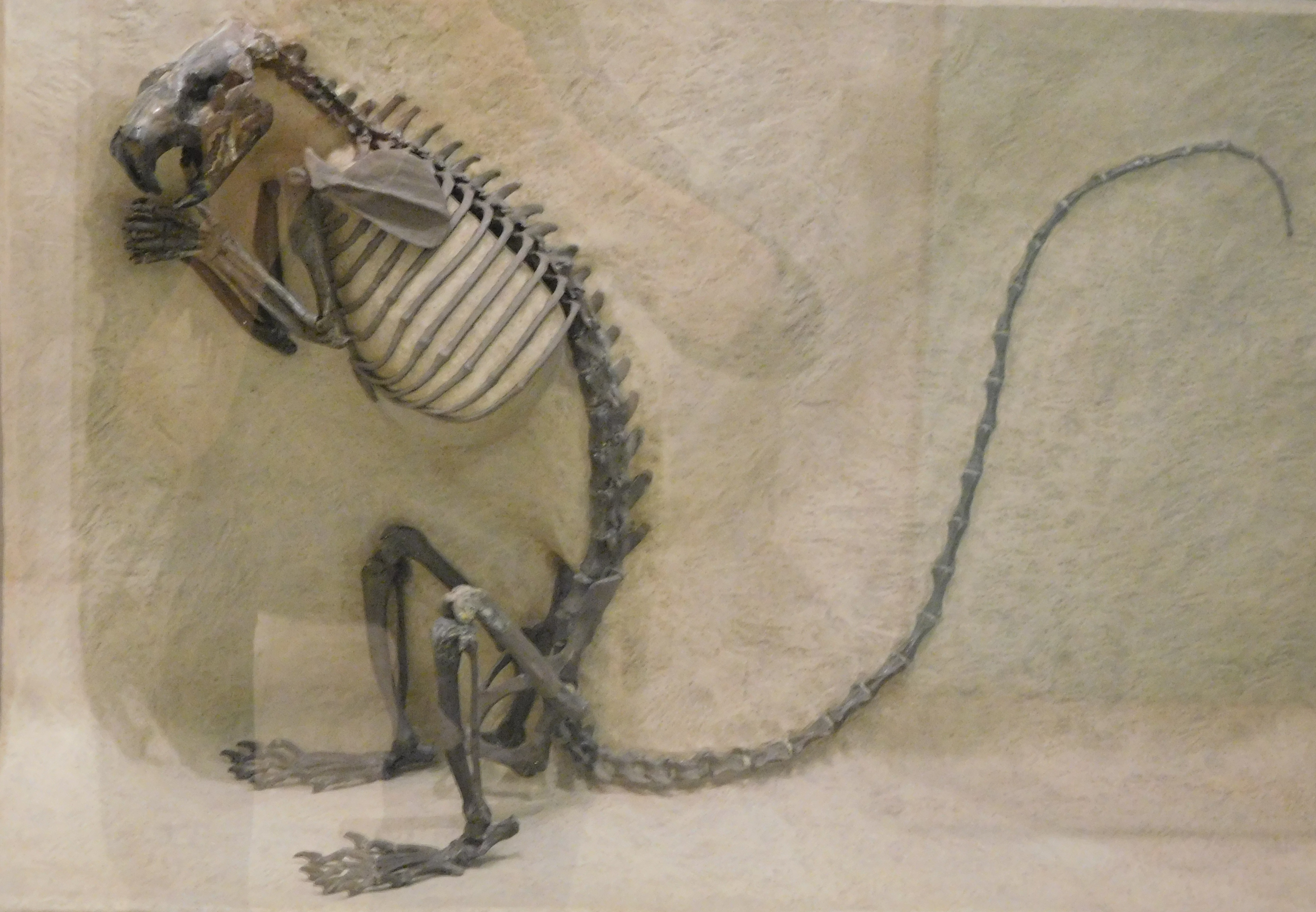
Skeleton of Paramys delicatus at the American Museum of Natural History

Ischyromyids seem to have a fairly generalized lifestyle as a whole, though there is variation within the group. Paramys, for example, has an unspecialized skeleton similar to "scampering" rodents like mice and rats. Paramys and its closest relatives may have been intermediate in lifestyle between ground squirrels and tree squirrels, with the forelimbs more consistent with arboreal habits and the hindlimbs more consistent with terrestrial habits. In other regards, the skeleton of Paramys is large and robust enough to be useful for scratch digging. Pseudotomus has an even more strongly-built skeleton with large muscle attachments, a broad snout, and large claws which are well-suited for scratch digging.

Conversely, Ailuravus may have had a similar lifestyle to tree porcupines or the largest arboreal squirrels. Lophiparamys also has ankle bones consistent with climbing habits.

Ischyromyids are unusual for the length of their hindlimbs, with the femur (thigh bone) longer than the skull, in contrast to modern rodents. In terms of skull dimensions, ischyromyids are more similar to ground-living sciuromorphs than tree-living species. Ischyromyid ankle fossils from China are similar to nutria and Old World porcupines, which are slow and generally terrestrial, albeit with some foot flexibility for occasionally climbing and burrowing.

The largest known ischyromyid species are Yakamys sirindhornae, from Late Eocene Thailand, and Manitsha tanka, an Oligocene paramyine in the tribe Manitshini. Both could grow larger than an average beaver, with Yakamys having an estimated weight of 30 kg (66 lb). These giant ischyromyids may have been semiaquatic, similar to modern capybaras.

=== Diet ===
In North America, ischyromyids had a broad distribution with few clear correlations to any particular plant species. There is some overlap with plants in the oak and chestnut family (Fagaceae), elms (Ulmaceae), legumes (Fabaceae), and spruce (Picea), alongside many other trees common to modern North America. Well-preserved skeletons of Ailuravus from the Messel Pit of Germany includes gut content of laurel and tea leaves.

== Classification ==
Ischyromyids are often divided into multiple subfamilies, particularly Ischyromyinae, Ailuravinae, Paramyinae, and Reithroparamyinae. Some authors prefer to raise these subfamilies to the family level (as Ailuravidae, Paramyidae, and Reithroparamyidae), while others encompass all under the single family Ischyromyidae.

- Ischyromyinae are medium to large-sized, with ossified auditory bullae and more specialized loph-bearing dentition.
- Ailuravinae (= Ailuravidae) are large, with short incisors, slender mandibles, and extensive development of cusps on their cheek teeth. They are most diverse in Europe, while other subfamilies tend to be more diverse in North America.
- Microparamyinae are small and enigmatic rodents, sometimes considered a tribe (Microparamyini) within Reithroparamyinae or Paramyinae. They share many similarities with Gliridae (modern dormice) and the extinct European rodent group Theridomorpha, and species are frequently scrambled between these groups.
- Paramyinae (= Paramyidae) are medium to large-sized, with strongly-built skulls and unossified auditory bullae. Over the course of their evolution, paramyines trend towards larger sizes and simpler tooth structures. The paramyine tribe Pseudoparamyini is sometimes raised to subfamily level (Pseudoparamyinae).
- Reithroparamyinae (= Reithroparamyidae) are small to medium-sized and have ossified auditory bullae. Their skeletons are lightly-built and the snout is rather narrow. Upper molars M1 and M2 are equal in size, with large hypocones.

=== List of genera ===
- incertae sedis
  - Decticadapis
  - Hulgana?
  - Yakamys
- Subfamily Ailuravinae (= Family Ailuravidae)
  - Ailuravus
  - Eohaplomys
  - Euromys
  - Meldimys
  - Mytonomys
- Subfamily Ischyromyinae
  - Ischyromys
  - Eoischyromys
  - Proischyromys
  - Spurimus?
- Subfamily Microparamyinae (= Tribe Microparamyini)
  - Churcheria
  - Hartenbergeromys?
  - Lophiparamys
  - Masillamys?
  - Mattimys
  - Microparamys
  - Pantrogna?
  - Sparnacomys?
  - Strathcona
- Subfamily Paramyinae (= Family Paramyidae)
  - Abrosomys
  - Anatoparamys
  - Asiaparamys
  - Asiomys
  - Corbarimys
  - Metaparamys
  - Taishanomys
  - Tribe Manitshini
    - Manitsha
    - Pseudotomus
  - Tribe Paramyini
    - Notoparamys
    - Paramys
    - Quadratomus
    - Tapomys
    - Thisbemys
    - Uintaparamys
  - Tribe Pseudoparamyini (= Subfamily Pseudoparamyinae)
    - Franimys
    - Patriarchamys
    - Plesiarctomys
    - Pseudoparamys
- Subfamily Reithroparamyinae (= Family Reithroparamyidae)
  - Acritoparamys
  - Apatosciuravus
  - Namaparamys?
  - Reithroparamys
  - Rapamys
  - Uriscus
