= Lophiparamys =

Lophiparamys Temporal range: Ypresian

Scientific classification
- Kingdom: Animalia
- Phylum: Chordata
- Class: Mammalia
- Order: Rodentia
- Family: †Ischyromyidae
- Subfamily: †Microparamyinae
- Genus: †Lophiparamys; Wood, 1962

Species
- Lophiparamys murinus Matthew, 1918 Lophiparamys debequensis Wood, 1962 Lophiparamys woodi Guthrie, 1971

Extinct rodent genus

Lophiparamys is an extinct genus of microparamyine rodent that lived during the Ypresian stage of the Eocene epoch.

== Palaeobiology ==
The morphology of the tarsus of Lophiparamys, including features such as an asymmetric astragalar tibial facet at the crurotarsal joint, a short calcaneal tuber, and the rounded shapes of both the calcaneal cuboid facet and astragalar head at the transverse tarsal joint, strongly implies that this paramyid was an arboreal animal.
