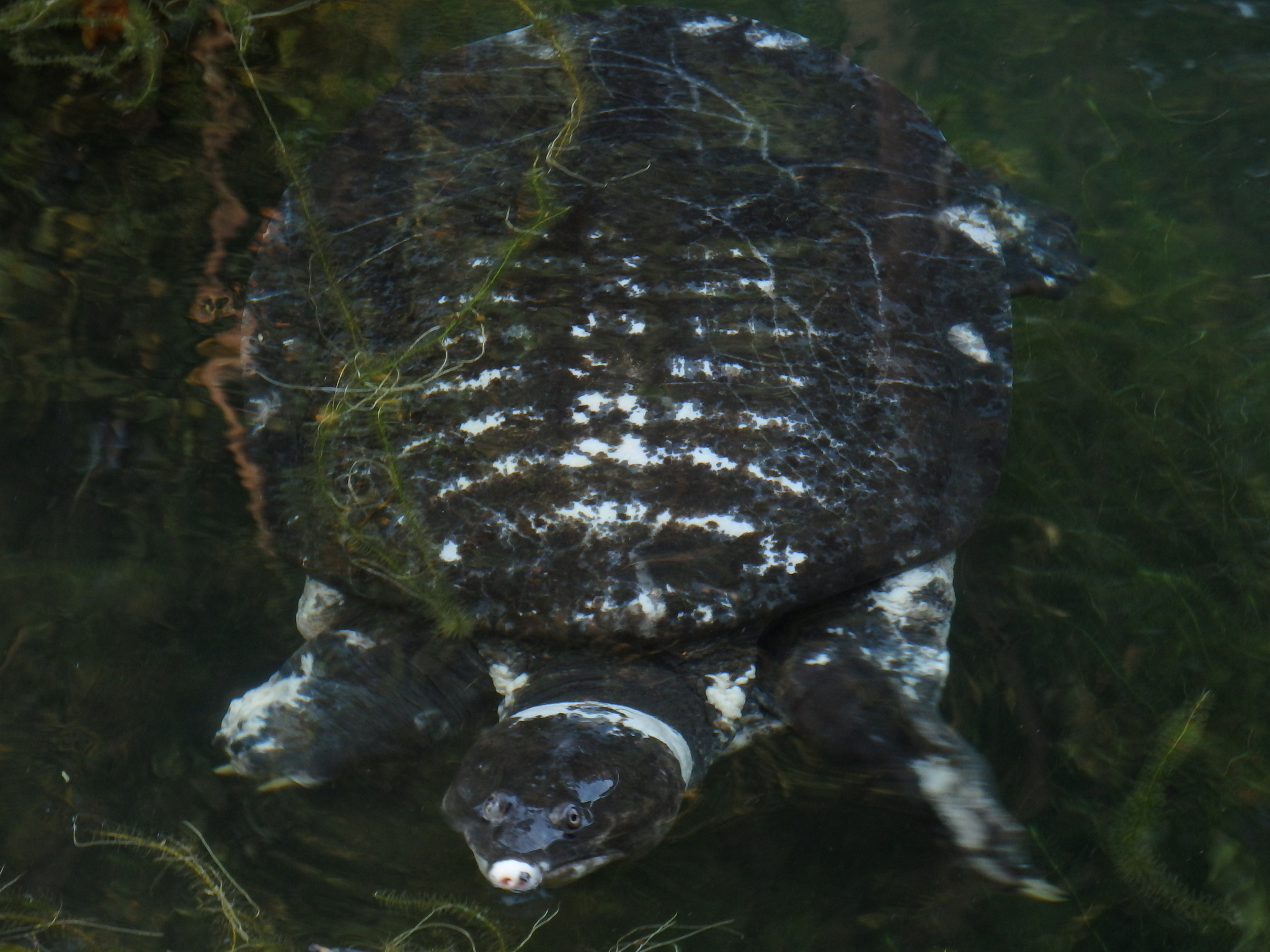
- Amyda cartilaginea

Scientific classification
- Kingdom: Animalia
- Phylum: Chordata
- Class: Reptilia
- Order: Testudines
- Suborder: Cryptodira
- Family: Trionychidae
- Subfamily: Trionychinae
- Genus: Amyda; Geoffroy Saint-Hilaire, 1809

Species
- Amyda cartilaginea Amyda ornata

= Amyda =

Genus of turtles

Amyda is a genus of softshell turtles in the family Trionychidae. It contains two extant species:

- Amyda cartilaginea - Asiatic softshell turtle ;
- Amyda ornata - Southeast Asian softshell turtle.

Both species were formerly considered subspecies of a single species, Amyda cartilaginea, but phylogenetic evidence supports both being distinct from one another. An undescribed species is also known from Borneo.

The fossil taxon †'Amyda' gregaria from the Eocene of Inner Mongolia has been tentatively placed in the genus Trionyx.

When it comes to the eating habits of Amyda, considering its multiple species, they are known for being opportunist omnivores. Their diet consists mainly of plants and fish.
