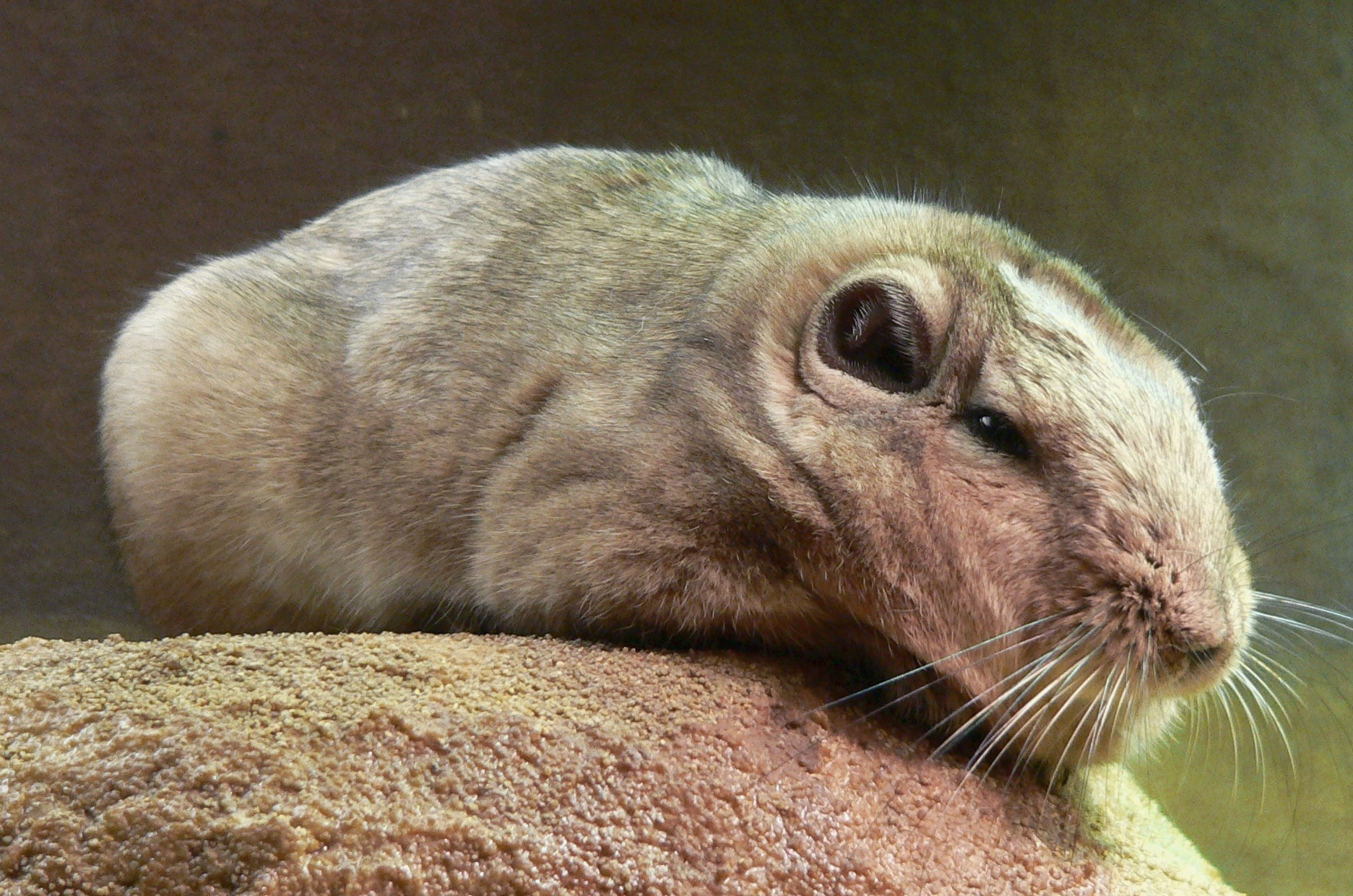
- Ctenodactylus gundi

Scientific classification
- Kingdom: Animalia
- Phylum: Chordata
- Class: Mammalia
- Order: Rodentia
- Suborder: Hystricomorpha
- Infraorder: Ctenodactylomorphi; Chaline and Mein, 1979

= Ctenodactylomorphi =

Infraorder of rodents

Ctenodactylomorphi is an infraorder of the rodent suborder Hystricomorpha that includes two living families, the Ctenodactylidae (gundis) and the Diatomyidae (Laotian rock rat).
