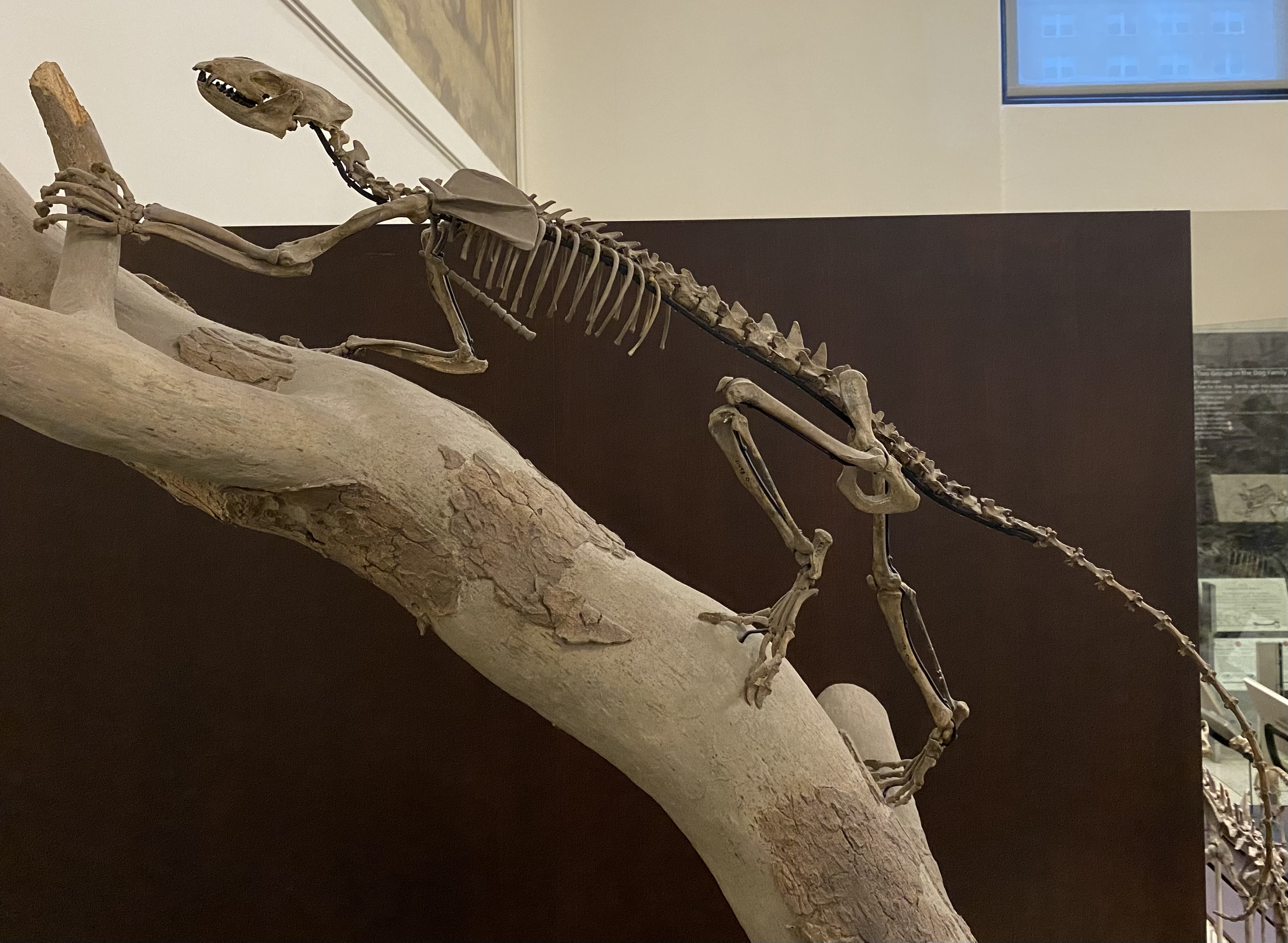
- Skeleton of Vulpavus ovatus at the American Museum of Natural History
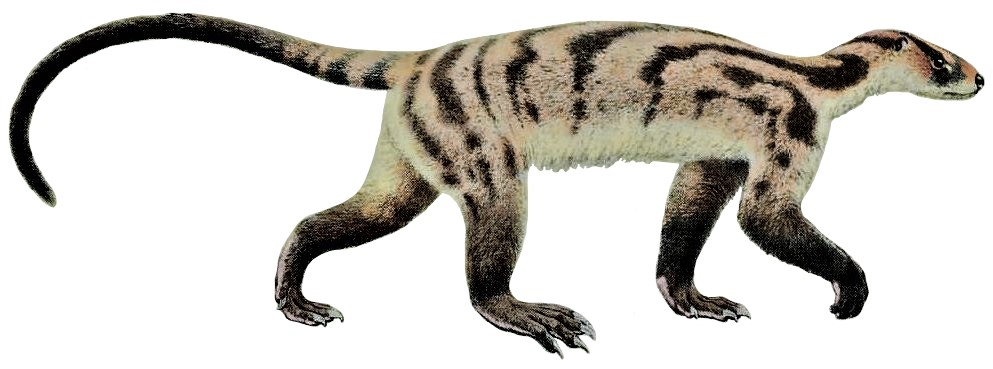
- Life restoration of V. ovatus

Scientific classification
- Kingdom: Animalia
- Phylum: Chordata
- Class: Mammalia
- Clade: Pan-Carnivora
- Clade: Carnivoramorpha
- Clade: Carnivoraformes
- Genus: †Vulpavus; Marsh, 1871

Type species
- †Vulpavus palustris Marsh, 1871

Species
- †V. australis Matthew & Granger, 1915; †V. canavus (Cope, 1881); †V. completus Matthew, 1909; †V. farsonensis Gunnell, 1998; †V. palustris Marsh, 1871; †V. profectus Matthew, 1909; Subgenus: †Phlaodectes Matthew, 1909; †V. ovatus (Matthew, 1909)

Synonyms
- synonyms of species: V. australis: Vulpavus asius Gazin, 1952; V. canavus: Miacis brevirostris Cope, 1881; Miacis canavus Cope, 1881; Prodaphaenus canavus Wortman, 1901; Uintacyon brevirostris Matthew, 1899; Uintacyon canavus Matthew, 1899; V. ovatus: Phlaodectes ovatus Matthew, 1909

= Vulpavus =

Vulpavus Temporal range: 54.9–46.2 Ma early to middle Eocene

Extinct genus of carnivores

Vulpavus ("ancestor of foxes") is an extinct paraphyletic genus of placental mammals from clade Carnivoraformes, that lived in North America from the early to middle Eocene.

== Phylogeny ==
The phylogenetic relationships of genus Vulpavus are shown in the following cladogram:

- Carnivoramorpha (Carnivora [sensu lato])
  - †Viverravidae sensu lato
    - †Viverravoidea
    - ?
      †Carnivoramorpha sp. (UALVP 50993 & UALVP 50994)
    - ?
      †Ravenictis
  - ?
    †Carnivoramorpha sp. (UALVP 31176)
  - ?
    †Carnivoramorpha sp. (USNM 538395)
  - ?
    †"Sinopa" insectivorus
  - Carnivoraformes
    - Clade "B"
      - - - - - - †Eogale
                - †"Miacis" sp. (CM 67873 & CM 77299)
                - †Gracilocyon igniculus
                - †Gracilocyon winkleri
              - †Gracilocyon solei
              - †Gracilocyon sp. (Jibou, Romania)
              - - †Gracilocyon rosei
                - †Gracilocyon rundlei
              - †Paramiacis
              - †Paroodectes
              - †Oodectes jepseni
            - †Oodectes herpestoides
            - †Oodectes proximus
            - †Oodectes pugnax
          - †Uintacyon hookeri
        - †Uintacyon rudis
      - - †Uintacyon massetericus
        - †Uintacyon vorax
      - †Uintacyon asodes
      - †Uintacyon edax
      - - †Uintacyon acutus
        - †Uintacyon jugulans
      - - †Uintacyon gingerichi
        - †Xinyuictis
      - †Zodiocyon
      - - †Miocyon
        - †Simamphicyon
      - - †Uintacyon sp. (USGS 1983)
        - †Messelogale
        - †Quercygalidae
    - Clade "C"
      - - - - - - †Palaearctonyx
                - (†Phlaodectes)
                  †Vulpavus ovatus
              - †Vulpavus profectus
              - - †Vulpavus australis
                - †Vulpavus canavus
            - †Vulpavus completus
            - †Vulpavus farsonensis
            - †Vulpavus palustris
          - †Vassacyon
        - - †Dormaalocyon
          - †"Miacis" exiguus
      - †"Miacis" deutschi
    - †Africtis
    - ?
      †Carnivoraformes undet. Genus B
    - †Dawsonicyon
    - †"Miacis" boqinghensis
    - †"Miacis" hookwayi
    - †"Miacis" latidens
    - †"Miacis" petilus
    - - ?
        †Carnivoraformes undet. Genus A
      - †Miacis
    - Clade "D"
      - - †Lycarion
        - †"Miacis" hargeri
      - ?
        †Ceruttia
      - †"Miacis" invictus
      - †"Miacis" lushiensis
      - †Neovulpavus
      - - - †Harpalodon
          - †Procynodictis
        - †Prodaphaenus
        - ?
          †Walshius
        - - †"Miacis" gracilis
          - †Tapocyon
          - Carnivora (sensu stricto)

== See also ==
- Mammal classification
- Carnivoraformes
- Miacidae
