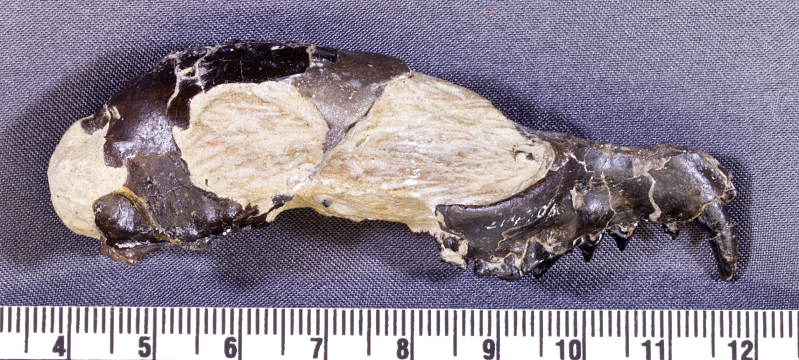
- skull of Miacis parvivorus

Scientific classification
- Kingdom: Animalia
- Phylum: Chordata
- Class: Mammalia
- Clade: Carnivoramorpha
- Clade: Carnivoraformes
- Genus: †Miacis; Cope, 1872

Type species
- †Miacis parvivorus Cope, 1872

Synonyms
- synonyms of species: M. parvivorus: Viverravus parvivorus (Matthew, 1899); Vulpavus parvivorus (Cope, 1873)

= Miacis =

Miacis Temporal range: 50.0–46.2 Ma early to middle Eocene

Extinct genus of carnivores

Miacis ("small point") is an extinct genus of placental mammals from clade Carnivoraformes, that lived in North America from the early to middle Eocene.

== Description ==
Miacis was five-clawed, similar in size to a stoat (~30 cm, tail not included), weighed between 1 and 7 kg, and likely had highly reversible hind feet that assisted in its arboreal lifestyle, similar to those of a squirrel.

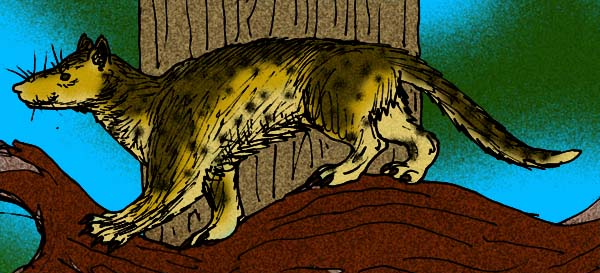
Illustration of Miacis

It had retractable claws, agile joints for climbing, and binocular vision.

Like many other early carnivoramorphans, it was well suited for an arboreal climbing lifestyle with needle-sharp claws, limbs, and joints resembling modern carnivorans. Miacis was probably a very agile forest dweller that preyed upon smaller animals, such as small mammals, reptiles, and birds, and might also have eaten eggs and fruits.

== Classification and phylogeny ==
=== Classification ===
Genus: †Miacis (Cope, 1872)
Species:	Distribution of the species and type locality:	Age:
†M. parvivorus (Cope, 1872)	USA: Colorado, Utah, and Wyoming (Black's Fork of Green River, Bridger Formation)	50,0 to 46,2 Ma

=== History of taxonomy ===
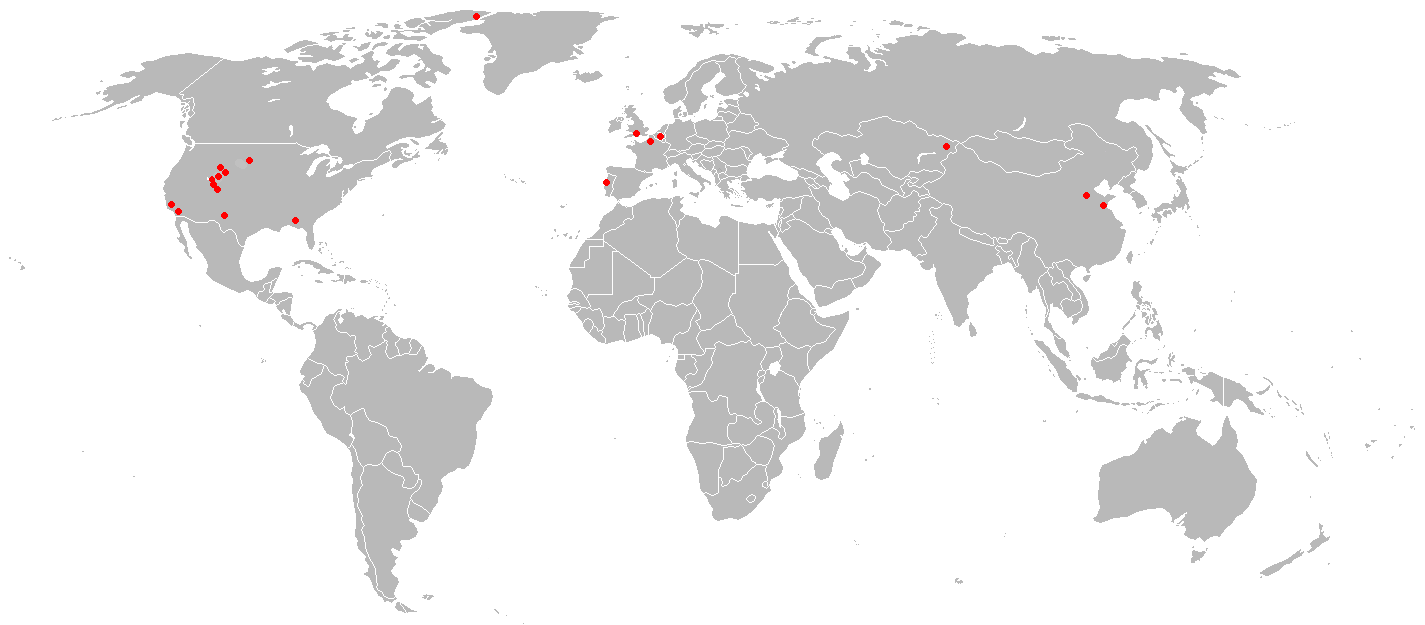
The locations of fossil site where "Miacis" fossils have been found.

Since Edward Drinker Cope first described the genus Miacis in 1872, at least twenty other species have been assigned to Miacis. However, these species share few synapomorphies other than plesiomorphic characteristics of miacids in general. This reflects the fact that Miacis has been treated as a wastebasket taxon and contains a diverse collection of species that belong to the stemgroup within the Carnivoraformes. Many of the species originally assigned to Miacis have since been assigned to other genera and, apart from the type species, Miacis parvivorus, the remaining species are often referred to with Miacis in quotations (e.g. "Miacis" latidens). The following table lists the former Miacis species in chronological order of their original description and notes the reassignments to other genera.

Species:	Type locality:	Status and notes:
M. sylvestris (Marsh, 1872)	Bridger Formation (Wyoming, USA)	now assigned to genus Harpalodon as Harpalodon sylvestris
M. vulpinus (Scott & Osborn, 1887)	Uinta Basin (Utah, USA)	Described as Amphicyon vulpinum; later assigned to Prodaphaenus and Miacis; now recognised as synonym of Miocyon scotti
M. uintensis (Osborn, 1895)	Uinta Basin (Utah, USA)	now assigned to genus Prodaphaenus as Prodaphaenus uintensis
M. hargeri (Wortman, 1901)	Bridger Formation (Wyoming, USA)	recognised as close relative to genus Lycarion
M. washakius (Wortman, 1901)	Bridger Formation (Wyoming, USA)	now assigned to genus Neovulpavus as Neovulpavus washakius
M. medius (Matthew, 1909)	Bridger Formation (Wyoming, USA)	now assigned to genus Lycarion as Lycarion medius
M. exiguus (Matthew & Granger, 1915)	Clark's Fork Basin (Wyoming, USA)	recognised as close relative to genus Dormaalocyon
M. latidens (Matthew & Granger, 1915)	Clark's Fork Basin (Wyoming, USA)	classified as a species of carnivoraform mammals outside of genus Miacis
M. invictus (Matthew & Granger, 1925)	Irdin Manha Formation (Inner Mongolia, China)	classified as a species of carnivoraform mammals outside of genus Miacis
M. hookwayi (Stock, 1934)	Tapo Canyon (California, USA)	classified as a species of carnivoraform mammals outside of genus Miacis
M. gracilis (Clark, 1939)	Uinta Basin (Utah, USA)	classified as a species of carnivoraform mammals outside of genus Miacis
M. latouri (Quinet, 1966)	Dormaal (Flemish Brabant, Belgium)	now assigned to genus Dormaalocyon as Dormaalocyon latouri
M. lushiensis (Chow, 1975)	Shanghuang Quarry (Jiangsu, China)	classified as a species of carnivoraform mammals outside of genus Miacis
M. deutschi (Gingerich, 1983)	Clark's Fork Basin (Wyoming, USA)	classified as a species of carnivoraform mammals outside of genus Miacis
M. petilus (Gingerich, 1983)	Clark's Fork Basin (Wyoming, USA)	classified as a species of carnivoraform mammals outside of genus Miacis
M. winkleri (Gingerich, 1983)	Clark's Fork Basin (Wyoming, USA)	now assigned to genus Gracilocyon as type species Gracilocyon winkleri
M. australis (Gustafson, 1986)	Rifle Range Hollow or Blue Cliff Horizon (Texas, USA)	now assigned to genus Angelarctocyon as Angelarctocyon australis in family Amphicyonidae
M. cognitus Gustafson, 1986	Reeves Bonebed (Texas, USA)	now assigned to genus Gustafsonia as Gustafsonia cognita in family Amphicyonidae
M. thailandicus (Ducrocq et al., 1992)	Krabi (South Thailand)	now assigned to genus Xinyuictis as Xinyuictis thailandicus
M. boqinghensis (Huang et al., 1999)	Huoshipo, Guojiazhuang Village, Hedi Formation (China)	classified as a species of carnivoraform mammals outside of genus Miacis
M. rosei (Heinrich et al., 2008)	Wyoming, USA	now assigned to genus Gracilocyon as Gracilocyon rosei
M. rundlei (Hooker, 2010)	Abbey Wood, England, UK	now assigned to genus Gracilocyon as Gracilocyon rundlei
M. solei (Smith & Smith, 2010)	Dormaal (Flemish Brabant, Belgium)	now assigned to genus Gracilocyon as Gracilocyon solei

=== Phylogeny ===
The phylogenetic relationships of genus Miacis are shown in the following cladogram:

- Carnivoramorpha (Carnivora [sensu lato])
  - †Viverravidae sensu lato
    - †Viverravoidea
    - ?
      †Carnivoramorpha sp. (UALVP 50993 & UALVP 50994)
    - ?
      †Ravenictis
  - ?
    †Carnivoramorpha sp. (UALVP 31176)
  - ?
    †Carnivoramorpha sp. (USNM 538395)
  - ?
    †"Sinopa" insectivorus
  - Carnivoraformes
    - Clade "B"
      - - - - - - †Eogale
                - †"Miacis" sp. (CM 67873 & CM 77299)
                - †Gracilocyon igniculus
                - †Gracilocyon winkleri
              - †Gracilocyon solei
              - †Gracilocyon sp. (Jibou, Romania)
              - - †Gracilocyon rosei
                - †Gracilocyon rundlei
              - †Paramiacis
              - †Paroodectes
              - †Oodectes jepseni
            - †Oodectes herpestoides
            - †Oodectes proximus
            - †Oodectes pugnax
          - †Uintacyon hookeri
        - †Uintacyon rudis
      - - †Uintacyon massetericus
        - †Uintacyon vorax
      - †Uintacyon asodes
      - †Uintacyon edax
      - - †Uintacyon acutus
        - †Uintacyon jugulans
      - - †Uintacyon gingerichi
        - †Xinyuictis
      - †Zodiocyon
      - - †Miocyon
        - †Simamphicyon
      - - †Uintacyon sp. (USGS 1983)
        - †Messelogale
        - †Quercygalidae
    - Clade "C"
      - - - - - - †Palaearctonyx
                - (†Phlaodectes)
                  †Vulpavus ovatus
              - †Vulpavus profectus
              - - †Vulpavus australis
                - †Vulpavus canavus
            - †Vulpavus completus
            - †Vulpavus farsonensis
            - †Vulpavus palustris
          - †Vassacyon
        - - †Dormaalocyon
          - †"Miacis" exiguus
      - †"Miacis" deutschi
    - †Africtis
    - ?
      †Carnivoraformes undet. Genus B
    - †Dawsonicyon
    - †"Miacis" boqinghensis
    - †"Miacis" hookwayi
    - †"Miacis" latidens
    - †"Miacis" petilus
    - - ?
        †Carnivoraformes undet. Genus A
      - †Miacis
        †Miacis parvivorous
    - Clade "D"
      - - †Lycarion
        - †"Miacis" hargeri
      - ?
        †Ceruttia
      - †"Miacis" invictus
      - †"Miacis" lushiensis
      - †Neovulpavus
      - - - †Harpalodon
          - †Procynodictis
        - †Prodaphaenus
        - ?
          †Walshius
        - - †"Miacis" gracilis
          - †Tapocyon
          - Carnivora (sensu stricto)

== See also ==
- Mammal classification
- Carnivoraformes
- Miacidae
