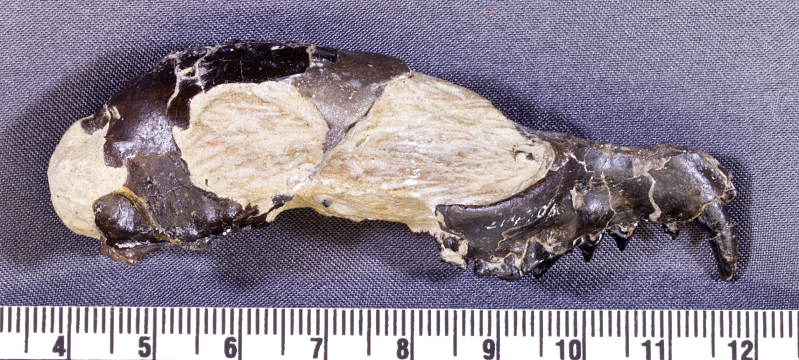
- skull of Miacis parvivorus
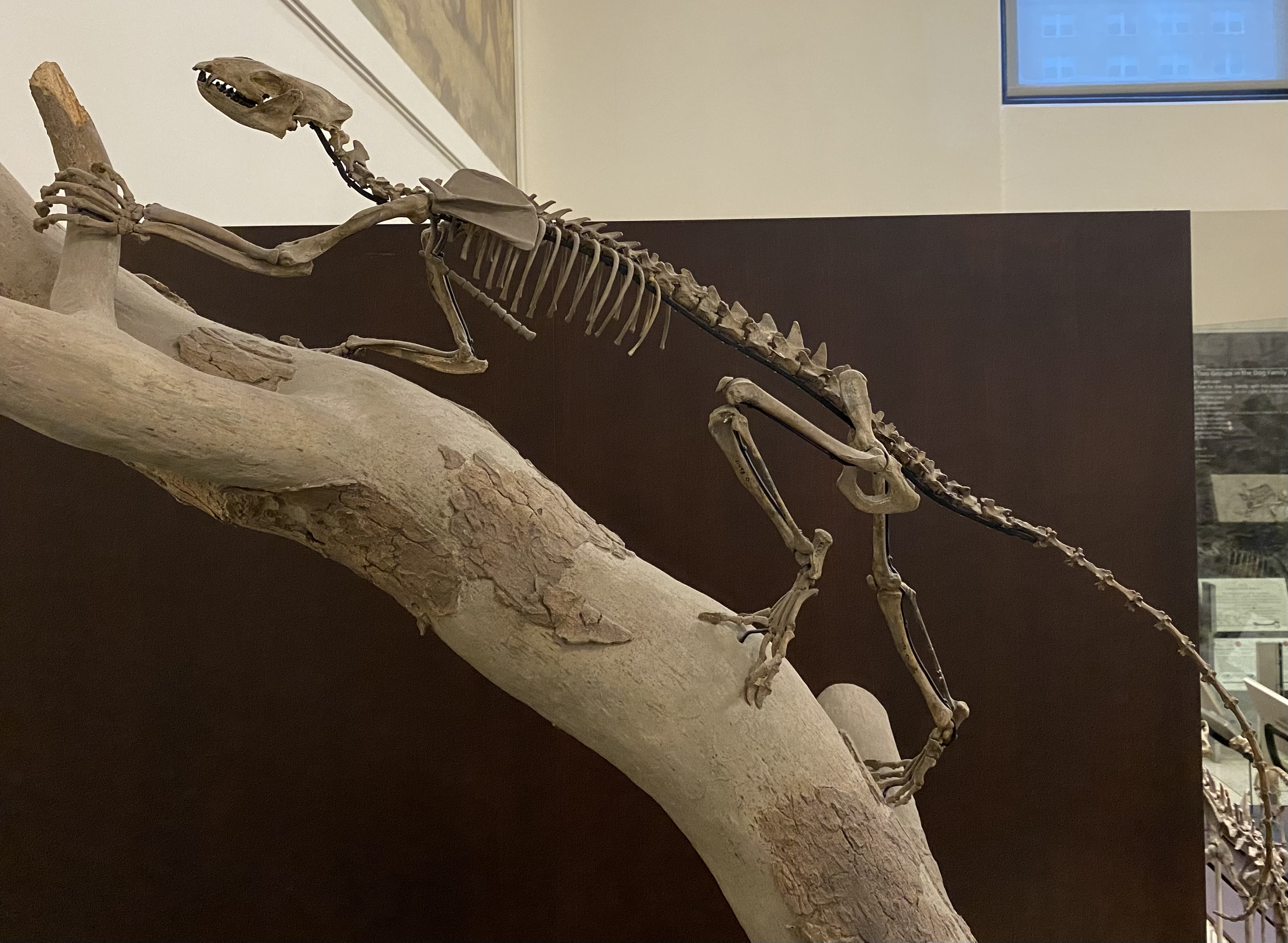
- skeleton of Vulpavus ovatus

Scientific classification
- Kingdom: Animalia
- Phylum: Chordata
- Class: Mammalia
- Clade: Carnivoraformes
- Family: †Miacidae; Cope, 1880

Type genus
- †Miacis Cope, 1872

Genera
- [see classification]

Synonyms
- list of synonyms: Cercoleptoidei (Matthew, 1909); Cynoidei (Matthew, 1909); Eucreodi (Matthew, 1909); Eucreodontia (Simionescu, 1928); Miacida (Haeckel, 1895); Miacinae (Trouessart, 1885); Miacini (Kalandadze & Rautian, 1992); Miacoidae (Teilhard, 1915); Miacoidea (Simpson, 1931); Palaeocarnivora (Pavlova, 1927); Quercygalidae (Kretzoi, 1945); Uintacyonidae (Hay, 1902); Vulpavidae (Matthew, 1909)

= Miacidae =

Miacidae Temporal range: 65.0–33.9 Ma early Paleocene to late Eocene

Extinct family of carnivores

Miacidae ("small points") is a former paraphyletic family of extinct primitive placental mammals that lived in North America, Europe and Asia during the Paleocene and Eocene epochs, about 65–33.9 million years ago. These mammals were basal to order Carnivora, the crown-group within the Carnivoraformes.

Miacids are thought to have evolved into the modern carnivorous mammals of the order Carnivora. They were small carnivores, superficially weasel-like or ferret-like.

They probably fed on invertebrates, lizards, birds, and smaller mammals like shrews and opossums. Their teeth and skulls show that the miacids were less developed than modern carnivorans.

== Classification ==
=== History of classification ===
The species Miacis australis are classified in the family Amphicyonidae within Caniformia.

Later authorities disagreed, and propose that the viverravids arose in North America 66-60 million years ago, spread to Asia then later to Europe, and were the first carnivorans and possessed the first true pair of carnassial teeth.

It has been proposed that miacids arose in North America and Europe 60-50 million years ago then later spread to Asia. Like the earlier viverravids, they possessed a true pair of carnassial teeth and therefore are related to order Carnivora. They also possessed a full set of cheek teeth, were weasel-to-small-fox-sized, and lived in forests. All modern carnivorans arose from them.

=== Taxonomy ===
- Family: †Miacidae (Cope, 1880)
  - Genus: †Chailicyon (Chow, 1975)
  - Genus: †Eogale (Beard & Dawson, 2009)
  - Genus: †Gracilocyon (Smith & Smith, 2010)
  - Genus: †Harpalodon (Marsh, 1872)
  - Genus: †Lycarion (Matthew, 1909)
  - Genus: †Messelogale (Springhorn, 2000)
  - Genus: †Miacis (Cope, 1872)
  - Genus: †Miocyon (Matthew, 1909)
  - Genus: †Neovulpavus (Wortman, 1901)
  - Genus: †Oodectes (Wortman, 1901)
  - Genus: †Palaearctonyx (Matthew, 1909)
  - Genus: †Paramiacis (Mathis, 1985)
  - Genus: †Paroodectes (Springhorn, 1980)
  - Genus: †Procynodictis (Wortman & Matthew, 1899)
  - Genus: †Prodaphaenus (Wortman & Matthew, 1899)
  - Genus: †Quercygale (Kretzoi, 1945)
  - Genus: †Simamphicyon (Viret, 1942)
  - Genus: †Tapocyon (Stock, 1934)
  - Genus: †Uintacyon (Leidy, 1872)
  - Genus: †Vassacyon (Matthew, 1909)
  - Genus: †Vulpavus (Marsh, 1871)
  - Genus: †Xinyuictis (Zheng, 1975)
  - Genus: †Zodiocyon (Tong & Wang, 2006)

=== Phylogeny ===
- Ferungulata
  - Euungulata
  - Ferae
    - Pholidota
    - - †Creodonta
      - Carnivoramorpha
        - †Viverravidae
        - ?
          †Ravenictis
        - ?
          †"Sinopa" insectivorus
        - Carnivoraformes
          - Carnivora
          - †Miacidae
