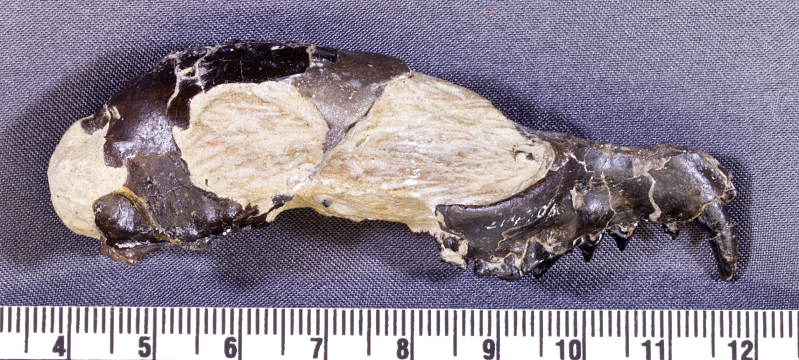
- skull of Miacis parvivorus
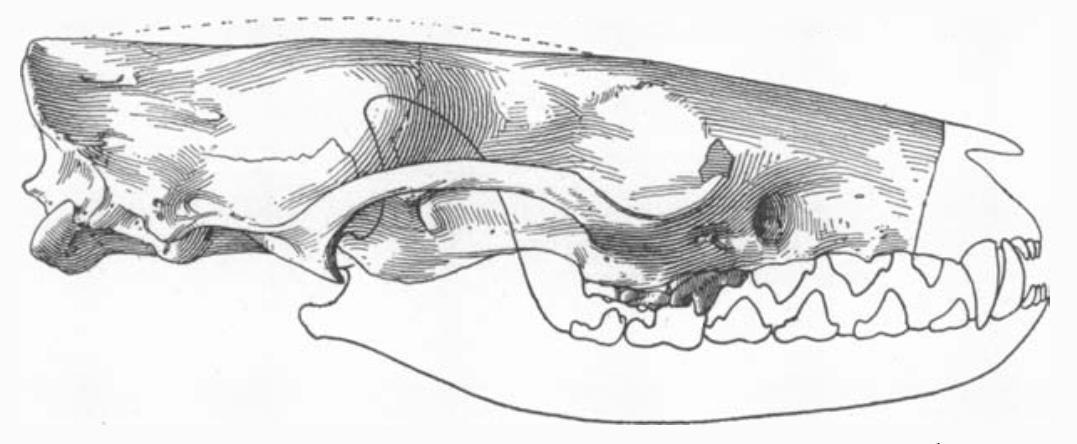
- skull of Viverravus minutus

Scientific classification
- Kingdom: Animalia
- Phylum: Chordata
- Class: Mammalia
- Clade: Carnivoramorpha
- Superfamily: †Miacoidea; Cope, 1880

Families
- †Miacidae; †Viverravidae; Incertae sedis: †"Sinopa" insectivorus

= Miacoidea =

Miacoidea Temporal range: 66.0–33.9 Ma early Paleocene to late Eocene

Extinct superfamily of carnivores

Miacoidea ("small points") is a former paraphyletic superfamily of extinct placental mammals that lived during the Paleocene and Eocene epochs, about 66-33.9 million years ago. This group had been traditionally divided into two families of primitive carnivorous mammals: Miacidae (the miacids) and Viverravidae (the viverravids). These mammals were basal to order Carnivora, the crown-group within the Carnivoramorpha.

== Biology ==
Miacoids were mostly small carnivorous mammals, superficially reminiscent of martens or civets. They probably fed on invertebrates, lizards, birds and smaller mammals like shrews and rodents, while others may have been insectivores. Some species were arboreal, others lived on the ground. Their teeth and skull show that the miacoids were less developed than modern carnivores.

== Classification ==
- Superfamily: †Miacoidea (Cope, 1880)
  - Family: †Miacidae (Cope, 1880)
  - Family: †Viverravidae (Wortman & Matthew, 1899)
  - Incertae sedis:
    - †"Sinopa" insectivorus (Cope, 1872)

== Phylogeny ==
- Ferungulata
  - Euungulata
  - Ferae
    - Pholidota
    - - †Creodonta
      - Carnivoramorpha
        - ?
          †Ravenictis
        - †Viverravidae
        - ?
          †"Sinopa" insectivorus
        - - †Miacidae
          - Carnivora
