= Argiles d'lignite du Soissonnais =

Geologic formation in France

- Stratigraphic range: Ypresian; ~55–50 Ma
- Type: Formation
- Underlies: Oise River Quaternary sediments
- Overlies: Thanetian marine green sands

Lithology
- Primary: Sandstone
- Other: Lignite, amber

Location
- Coordinates: 49.3°N 2.7°E
- Approximate paleocoordinates: 44.8°N 0.0°E
- Region: Oise
- Country: France

Type section
- Named for: Soissonnais
- Argiles d'lignite du Soissonnais (France)

The Argiles d'lignite du Soissonnais is a geologic formation in the Oise department of northern France. The formation has provided fossil mammals, reptiles and fish as well as arthropods in the amber of the formation. The Argiles d'lignite du Soissonnais is dated to the Ypresian age of the Eocene period.

== Description ==
The formation comprises a succession of lenticular bodies showing two main facies; clayey sands rich in frequently pyritised lignite, together with amber and grey clayey sands with less lignite (1 to 12% of the sediment), with continental vertebrate fauna. These facies, the rarity of mollusk shells and charophytes, probably due to decarbonatation and the presence of pyrrhotite (FeS_{4}), reflect a hypoxic environment.

The strata were deposited at the bottom of two channels cutting into underlying Thanetian marine green sands. The channels prograde toward the northeast and were discovered under Oise River Quaternary deposits.

== Fossil content ==
The formation has provided among others the following fossils:

=== Mammals ===
Primates

- Teilhardina aff. belgica
- Cantius sp.
- Platychoerops sp.

Artiodactyls

- Diacodexis sp.

Cimolesta

- Esthonyx sp.
- cf. Apatotheria indet.

Eutheria

- Palaeosinopa sp.
- cf. Landenodon sp.

Ferae

- Dormaalocyon latouri
- Gracilocyon solei
- Oxyaena woutersi
- Palaeonictis gigantea
- Palaeanodon sp.
- Vassacyon taxidiotis

Hyaenodonta

- Arfia gingerichi
- Prototomus girardoti
- P. minimus

Macroscelidea

- cf. Macrocranion sp.

Multituberculata

- Multituberculata indet.

Perissodactyls

- Chowliia europea
- cf. Pachynolophus sp.

Placentalia

- Hyopsodus sp.

Rodents

- Pliolophus quesnoyensis
- Ischyromyidae indet.

Soricomorpha

- Leptacodon sp.
- Wyonycteris sp.

Theriiformes

- Peratherium sp.
- Pantodonta indet.

=== Reptiles ===
Turtles

- Merovemys ploegi
- Paleotrionyx cf. vittatus
- Cryptodira indet.
- Trionychidae indet.

Crocodiles

- Allognathosuchus sp.
- Asiatosuchus sp.
- Diplocynodon sp.

Lizards

- Eolacerta sp.
- Placosaurus sp.
- Plesiolacerta sp.
- Gekkonidae indet.
- Lacertidae indet.
- ?Anguinae indet.
- ?Cordylidae indet.
- ?Iguanidae indet.
- ?Necrosaurus indet.

Snakes

- Dunnophis matronensis
- Saniwa cf. orsmaelensis
- Boidae indet.

=== Amphibians ===
- Caudata indet.
- Pelobatidae indet.
- Salamandroidea indet.
- cf. Koaliella indet.

=== Fish ===
- Anomotodon novus
- Isurolamna inflata
- Lepisosteus fimbriatus
- Otodus obliquus
- Pachygaleus lefevrei
- Palaeogaleus vincenti
- Palaeohypotodus rutoti
- Squalus orpiensis
- Striatolamia striata
- Cyclurus sp.
- Heterodontus sp.
- Myliobatis sp.
- Notorynchus sp.
- Squatina sp.
- Percoidei indet.

=== Arthropods ===
Diptera

- Eurodoliopteryx inexpectatus
- Coleoptera, Hemiptera, Hymenoptera, Psocodea, Arachnida

=== Pancrustacea ===
- Collembola indet.
- Hexapoda indet.

=== Flora ===
- Nitellopsis sp.
- Pinophyta indet.
- Arecaceae indet.
- Myricaceae indet.
- Juglandaceae indet.
- Lauraceae indet.
- Apocynaceae indet.
- Caesalpiniaceae indet.
- Celastraceae indet.

== See also ==
- List of fossiliferous stratigraphic units in France
- Ypresian formations
  - Ieper Group of Belgium
  - Fur Formation of Denmark
  - London Clay Formation of England
  - Silveirinha Formation of Portugal
- Wasatchian formations
  - Nanjemoy Formation of the eastern United States
  - Wasatch Formation of the western United States
- Itaboraian formations
  - Itaboraí Formation of Brazil
  - Laguna del Hunco Formation of Argentina
