= Chailicyon =

Chailicyon Temporal range: Middle to Late Eocene

Scientific classification
- Domain: Eukaryota
- Kingdom: Animalia
- Phylum: Chordata
- Class: Mammalia
- Clade: Carnivoraformes
- Order: Carnivora
- Suborder: Feliformia
- Genus: †Chailicyon; Chow (1975)

Extinct genus of carnivores

Chailicyon is an extinct genus in the basal Carnivoramorph family Miacidae that lived in Asia during the Middle to Late Eocene.

== Taxonomy ==
Chailicyon was named by Chow (1975). It was assigned to Miacidae by Carroll (1988).

== Sources ==
- museum03.museumwww.naturekundmuseum-berlin.de
- The Terrestrial Eocene-Oligocene Transition in North America by Donald R. Prothero and Robert J. Emry ISBN 0-521-43387-8
