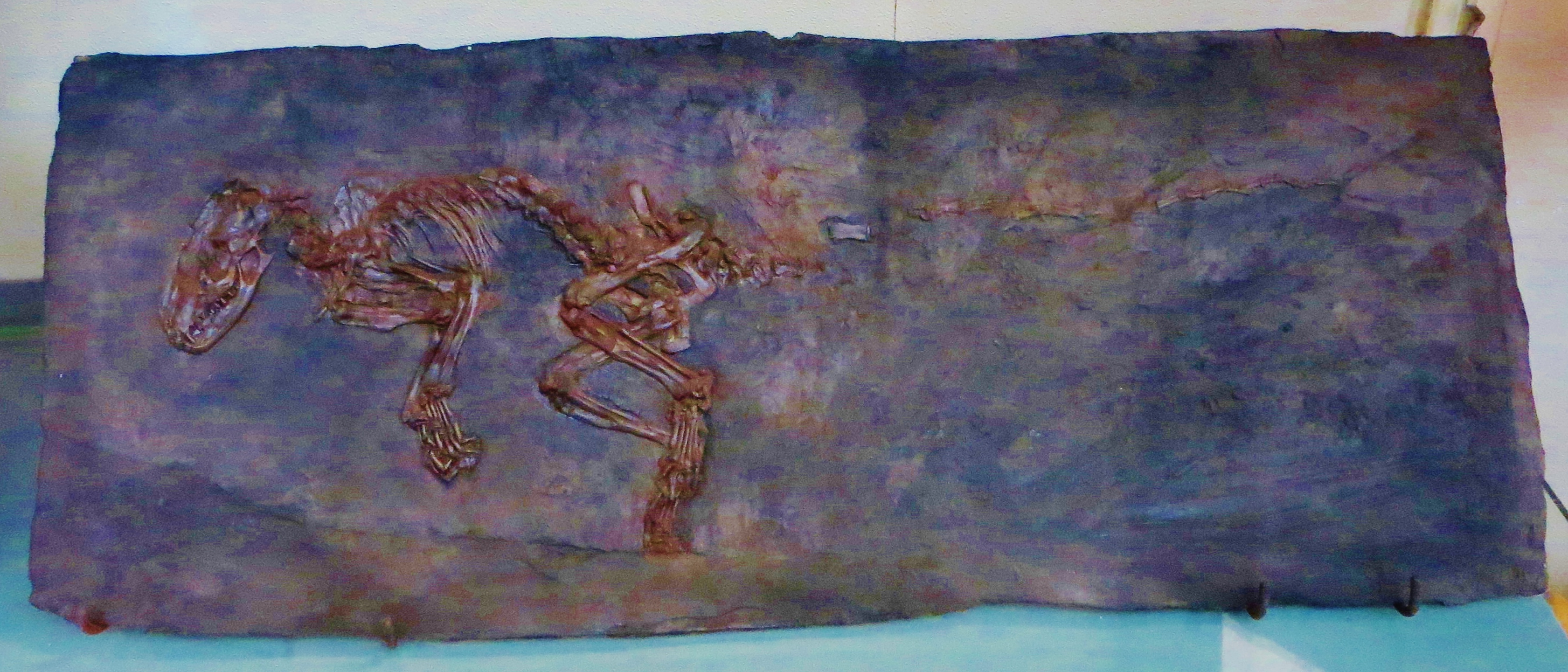
- Fossil of Paroodectes feisti

Scientific classification
- Kingdom: Animalia
- Phylum: Chordata
- Class: Mammalia
- Infraclass: Placentalia
- Clade: Pan-Carnivora
- Clade: Carnivoramorpha
- Clade: Carnivoraformes
- Genus: †Paroodectes; Springhorn, 1980

Type species
- †Paroodectes feisti Springhorn, 1980

Synonyms
- synonyms of genus: Paroödectes (Springhorn, 1980); synonyms of species: P. feisti: Paroödectes feisti (Springhorn, 1980)

= Paroodectes =

Paroodectes Temporal range: 47.8–46.2 Ma middle Eocene

Extinct genus of carnivores

Paroodectes ("near Oodectes") is an extinct genus of placental mammals from clade Carnivoraformes, that lived in Europe during the middle Eocene.

It lived in rain forests and swamps and was a prehistoric predator that had the size and appearance of a cat and was well adapted to climbing, as is apparent from its limbs, joints and shoulder bones. Its long tail gave balance for tree climbing and jumping from branch to branch. Paroodectes probably hunted insects, rodents, and small primates in the tree tops.

Only one species of Paroodectes (P. feisti) has been found, and this was at the Messel Pit located southeast of Frankfurt, Germany. The pit was formed during the Geiseltalian Period (or Middle Eocene) about 50 million years ago. The fossil was found by private collector Otto Feist in 1974. It was described in 1980 by Rainer Springhorn who said the following about the species:

"The odontological features of the Messel-Miacid are nearest to the new world genus Oodectes from the Bridger Basin (Bridgerian). No direct relationship exists to European species. The structure of the postcranial skeleton shows great conformity with North American Miacinae. Differences result from proportions skull-length/stature and length of vertebral column/length of limbs. A well-developed clavicle is extant. Scaphoid, lunar and central are distinct. Metatarsals are elongated. Hand and foot are adapted to plantigrade locomotion. An arboricole [living in trees] habit is assumed. Some morphologic features are reminiscent of the Viverridae and some Procyonidae."
