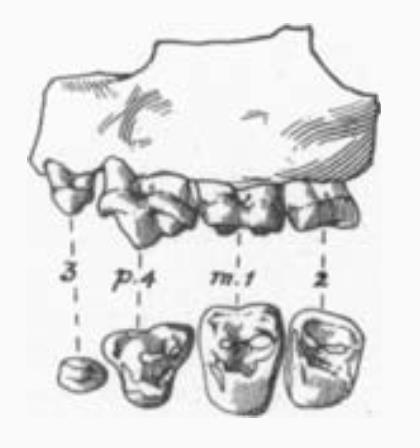
- part of upper jaw of Palaearctonyx meadi

Scientific classification
- Kingdom: Animalia
- Phylum: Chordata
- Class: Mammalia
- Clade: Pan-Carnivora
- Clade: Carnivoramorpha
- Clade: Carnivoraformes
- Genus: †Palaearctonyx; Matthew, 1909

Type species
- †Palaearctonyx meadi Matthew, 1909

= Palaearctonyx =

Palaearctonyx Temporal range: 50.5–46.2 Ma early to middle Eocene

Extinct genus of carnivores

Palaearctonyx ("ancient bear's claw") is an extinct genus of omnivorous placental mammals from clade Carnivoraformes, that lived in North America from the early to middle Eocene.

== Classification and phylogeny ==
=== Classification ===
Palaearctonyx was named by Matthew in 1909 and it was assigned to family Miacidae. Later, it was assigned to Caniformia by Flynn and Galiano in 1982, and then back to Miacidae by Flynn in 1998. From 2010 and later, this genus was assigned to clade Carnivoraformes.
