= Altacreodus =

Altacreodus Temporal range: 70.0–66.043 Ma Late Cretaceous

Scientific classification
- Kingdom: Animalia
- Phylum: Chordata
- Class: Mammalia
- Mirorder: Ferae
- Clade: Pan-Carnivora (?)
- Genus: †Altacreodus; Fox, 2015

Type species
- †Altacreodus magnus Clemens & Russell, 1965

Synonyms
- synonyms of species: A. magnus: Cimolestes magnus (Clemens & Russell, 1965)

Extinct genus of mammals

Altacreodus ("creodont from Alberta") is an extinct genus of eutherian mammals. Fossils have been found in North America where they first appeared during the Late Cretaceous, and they died out prior to the start of the Paleocene. It is possibly one of the earliest known placental mammals in the fossil record.

The type species is "Cimolestes" magnus, which was renamed Altacreodus magnus in 2015. Based on the dimensions of its preserved remains, its size was comparable to the large metatherian Didelphodon. Recent phylogenetic analyses suggests that genus Altacreodus is a member of clade Pan-Carnivora and the closest known sister taxon to order Hyaenodonta, based on anatomy of its teeth. In some studies its position as a crown-group placental has been equivocal.
