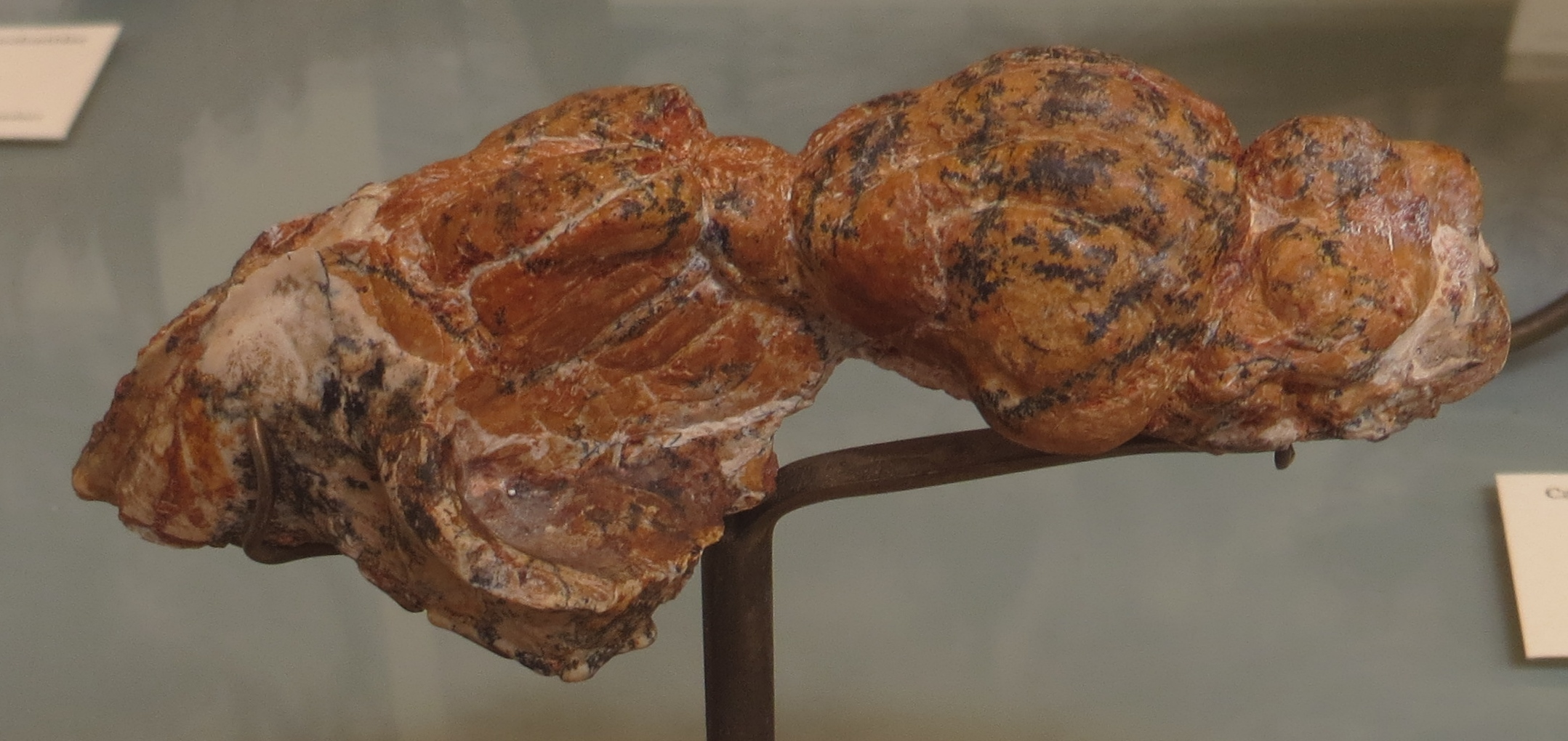
- skull of species Quercygale angustidens

Scientific classification
- Kingdom: Animalia
- Phylum: Chordata
- Class: Mammalia
- Clade: Pan-Carnivora
- Clade: Carnivoramorpha
- Clade: Carnivoraformes
- Family: †Miacidae; Kretzoi, 1945
- Genus: †Quercygale; Kretzoi, 1945

Type species
- †Quercygale angustidens Filhol, 1872

Species
- [see classification]

Synonyms
- synonyms of genus: Humbertia (De Beaumont, 1965); synonyms of species: Q. angustidens: Humbertia angustidens (De Beaumont, 1965); Procynodictis euzetensis (Depéret, 1917); Viverra angustidens (Filhol, 1872); Viverravus euzetensis (Depéret, 1917); Q. hastingsae: Viverra hastingsae (Davies, 1884); Viverravus hastingsae (Depéret, 1917); Q. helvetica: Cynodon helveticus (Rütimeyer, 1862); Humbertia helvetica (De Beaumont, 1965); Miacis macintyri (Van Valen, 1965); Quercygale macintyri (Russell, 1982); Tapocyon macintyri (Russell, 1982)

= Quercygale =

Quercygale Temporal range: 55.2–35.0 Ma Early to Late Eocene

Extinct genus of carnivores

Quercygale ("weasel from Quercy") is an extinct genus of placental mammals from the clade Carnivoraformes, that lived in Europe during the early to late Eocene.

== Relation to other taxa ==
Currently, Quercygale is either assigned to no family (i. e. it is just classified as one of the basal genera of Carnivoraformes) or it is assigned to the paraphyletic family Miacidae. Phylogenetic analysis of the basicranial morphology of carnivoramorphans suggests that Quercygale is the most advanced member of the clade Carnivoraformes as a sister taxon to crown-clade Carnivora, predating the split between Feliformia and Caniformia. Another recent study, however, has proposed that the genus Quercygale should be placed as a stem group within Feliformia.

In the past (till about 2010), Quercygale was assigned either to the family Miacidae (which was considered monophyletic in the past), or to the family Viverravidae. Only one author (Kretzoi 1945) classified it as the only genus of its own family Quercygalidae (Quercygalidae, however, was considered another name for the family Miacidae by another author). Alternatively, individual authors considered Quercygale to be a basal genus of Caniformia or a synonym of the genus Tapocyon.

== Species ==
Genus: †Quercygale (Kretzoi, 1945)
Species:	Distribution of the species and type locality:	Age:
†Q. angustidens (Filhol, 1872)	France (Quercy Phosphorites and Sables Du Castrais)	40.0–37.5 Ma
†Q. hastingsae (Davies, 1884)	UK (Headon Bedes)	37.8–37.5 Ma
†Q. helvetica (Rütimeyer, 1862)	France; Germany; Switzerland	47.8–41.2 Ma
†Q. smithi (Solé, 2014)	France (Mutigny and Mancy)	55.2–47.8 Ma
†Q. sp. [MNNA 9010] (Astibia, 2000)	Spain (Basque Country)	37.0–35.0 Ma
