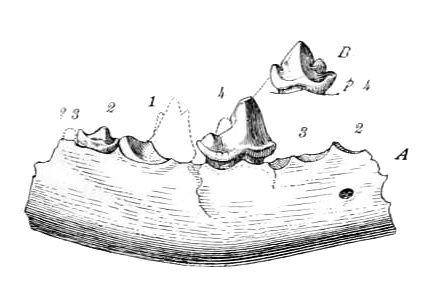
- part of lower jaw of Prodaphaenus uintensis

Scientific classification
- Kingdom: Animalia
- Phylum: Chordata
- Class: Mammalia
- Clade: Pan-Carnivora
- Clade: Carnivoramorpha
- Clade: Carnivoraformes
- Genus: †Prodaphaenus; Wortman & Matthew, 1899

Type species
- †Prodaphaenus uintensis (Osborn, 1895)

Synonyms
- synonyms of species: P. uintensis: Miacis uintensis (Osborn, 1895)

= Prodaphaenus =

Prodaphaenus Temporal range: 45.7–42.8 Ma middle Eocene

Extinct genus of carnivores

Prodaphaenus ("before Daphoenus") is an extinct genus of placental mammals from clade Carnivoraformes, that lived in North America during the middle Eocene.
