= Dawsonicyon =

Dawsonicyon Temporal range: 49.0–46.7 Ma early to middle Eocene

Scientific classification
- Kingdom: Animalia
- Phylum: Chordata
- Class: Mammalia
- Infraclass: Placentalia
- Clade: Pan-Carnivora
- Clade: Carnivoramorpha
- Clade: Carnivoraformes
- Genus: †Dawsonicyon; Spaulding, Flynn & Stucky, 2010

Type species
- †Dawsonicyon isami Spaulding, Flynn & Stucky, 2010

Extinct genus of mammals

Dawsonicyon ("Dawson's dog") is an extinct genus of placental mammals from clade Carnivoraformes, that lived in North America from the early to middle Eocene. Fossils of type species Dawsonicyon isami are known from the ‘Bridger B’, site of Black's Fork member of the Bridger Formation in Wyoming, and includes an almost complete skeleton (holotype DMNH 19585).
