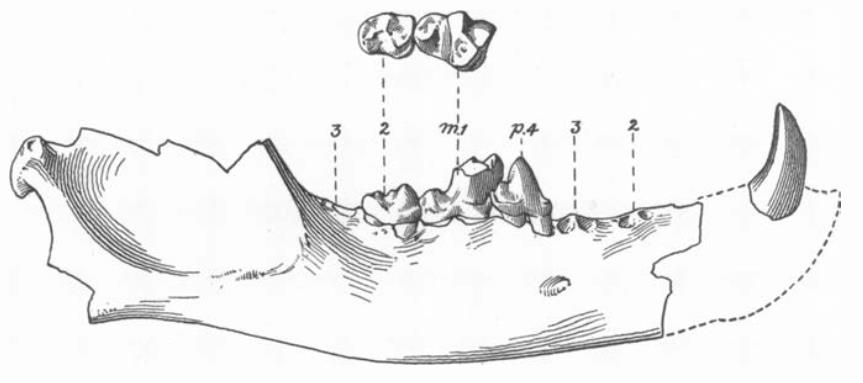
- lower jaw of Miocyon major

Scientific classification
- Kingdom: Animalia
- Phylum: Chordata
- Class: Mammalia
- Clade: Pan-Carnivora
- Clade: Carnivoramorpha
- Clade: Carnivoraformes
- Genus: †Miocyon; Matthew, 1909

Type species
- †Miocyon scotti Wortman & Matthew, 1899

Species
- †M. bathygnathus (Scott, 1888); †M. magnus (Bryant, 1992); †M. major (Matthew, 1909); †M. scotti (Wortman & Matthew, 1899); †M. vallisrubrae (Friscia & Rasmussen, 2010)

Synonyms
- synonyms of species: M. bathygnathus: Miacis bathygnathus (Scott, 1888); Uintacyon bathygnathus (Matthew, 1909); M. major: Uintacyon major (Matthew, 1909); M. scotti: Amphicyon vulpinum (Scott & Osborn, 1887); Amphicyon vulpinus (Scott & Osborn, 1887); Miacis vulpinus (Matthew, 1909); Prodaphaenus scotti (Scott & Osborn, 1887); Uintacyon scotti (Matthew, 1909); Uintacyon vulpinus (Hay, 1902); M. vallisrubrae: Uintacyon scotti (Gustafson, 1986)

= Miocyon =

Miocyon Temporal range: 50.5–37.0 Ma early to late Eocene

Extinct genus of carnivores

Miocyon ("lesser dog") is an extinct genus of placental mammals from clade Carnivoraformes, that lived in North America from the early to late Eocene.
