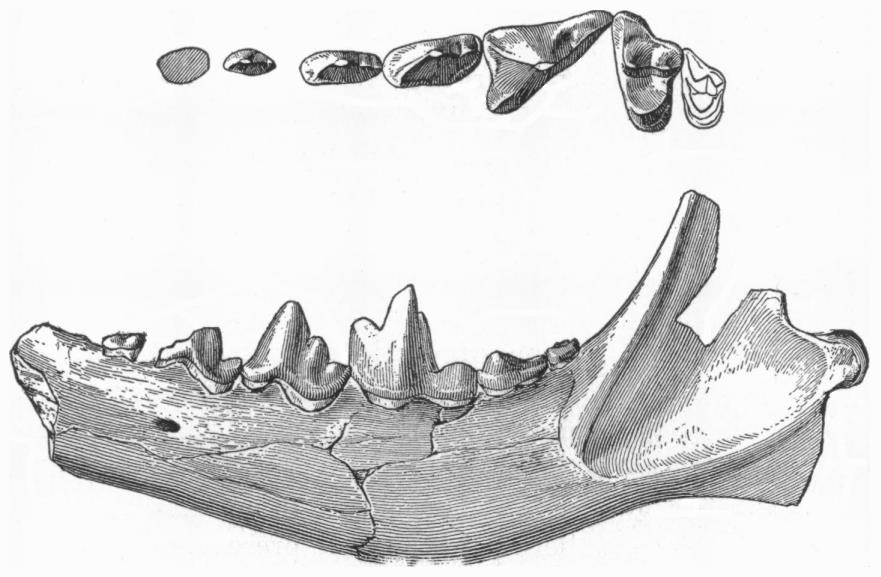
- lower jaw of Procynodictis vulpiceps

Scientific classification
- Kingdom: Animalia
- Phylum: Chordata
- Class: Mammalia
- Clade: Pan-Carnivora
- Clade: Carnivoramorpha
- Clade: Carnivoraformes
- Genus: †Procynodictis; Wortman & Matthew, 1899

Type species
- †Procynodictis vulpiceps Wortman & Matthew, 1899

Species
- †P. progressus (Stock, 1935); †P. vulpiceps (Wortman & Matthew, 1899)

Synonyms
- synonyms of genus: Plesiomiacis (Simpson, 1945); synonyms of species: P. progressus: Plesiomiacis progressus (Simpson, 1945); Viverravus progressus (Stock, 1935)

= Procynodictis =

Procynodictis Temporal range: 50.5–39.7 Ma early to middle Eocene

Extinct genus of carnivores

Procynodictis ("before Cynodictis") is an extinct genus of placental mammals from clade Carnivoraformes, that lived in North America from the early to middle Eocene.
