= Paramiacis =

Paramiacis Temporal range: 40.0–37.5 Ma middle to late Eocene

Scientific classification
- Kingdom: Animalia
- Phylum: Chordata
- Class: Mammalia
- Clade: Pan-Carnivora
- Clade: Carnivoramorpha
- Clade: Carnivoraformes
- Genus: †Paramiacis; Mathis, 1985

Type species
- †Paramiacis exilis Filhol, 1876

Species
- †P. exilis (Filhol, 1876); †P. teilhardi (Mathis, 1987)

Synonyms
- synonyms of species: P. exilis: Cynodictis exilis (Filhol, 1876); Miacis exilis (Teilhard, 1888); P. teilhardi: Miacis exilis (Guth, 1964); Miacis exilis forme A (Teilhard, 1915); Paramiacis exilis (Mathis, 1985)

Extinct genus of carnivores

Paramiacis ("near Miacis") is an extinct genus of placental mammals from clade Carnivoraformes, that lived in Europe from the middle to late Eocene. Species P. exilis and P. teilhardi were long believed to be the same species (P. exilis), with differences that were only represented as an example of sexual dimorphism.
