= George Frederick Matthew =

Canadian botanist and geologist (1837–1923)

- Born: August 12, 1837; Saint John, New Brunswick
- Died: April 14, 1923 (aged 85); Hastings-on-Hudson, New York
- Scientific career
- Fields: Geology, Paleontology
- Author abbrev. (botany): Matthew

George Frederick Matthew (August 12, 1837 – April 14, 1923) was a Canadian botanist and geologist. Described as an amateur geologist, he is nevertheless recognized for his work in the then-nascent field of ichnology. His work grew from study of Cambro-Ordovician rocks near his birthplace, leading to the description of new genera and species of ichnofossils. His early interest in geology may have been inspired by local access to the Abraham Gesner geological collection.

Matthew was the first curator of the Natural History Society of New Brunswick. After Canada's Confederation in 1867, his geological work came to prominence as the Geological Survey of Canada began, and he worked part-time for the survey.

He received honorary doctorates from Laval University and the University of New Brunswick, and was awarded the Geological Society of London's Murchison Medal in 1917.

== Publications ==
- 1871. On the surface geology of New Brunswick . 19 pp.
- 1882. Illustrations of the fauna of the St. John group microform. 21 pp. Trans. Royal Soc. Canada. ISBN 0-665-27383-5
- 1894. Post-glacial faults at St. John, N. B.
- 1898. A paleozoic terrain beneath the Cambrian. Ann. NY Academy of Sci., v. 12, Nº 2
- 1903. On batrachian and other footprints from the Coal Measures of Joggins, N.S. Bull. Natural History Soc. New Brunswick 5: 103-108
- 1903. An attempt to classify Palaeozoic batrachian footprints. Proc.Trans. Royal Soc. Canada, 2ª ser. 9(4): 109-121
- 1903. New genera of batrachian footprints of the Carboniferous System in eastern Canada. Canadian Record of Science 9: 99-111
- 1904. Note on the genus Hylopus of Dawson. Bull. Natural History Soc. New Brunswick 5: 247-252
- 1904. New species and a new genus of batrachian footprints of the Carboniferous System in eastern Canada. Proc. Royal Soc. of Canada, 2ª ser. 10 (sect. iv): 77-122
- 1909. Remarkable forms of the Little River Group. Trans. Royal Society of Canada, 3ª ser. 1909-1910, III (sect. iv): 113-133
