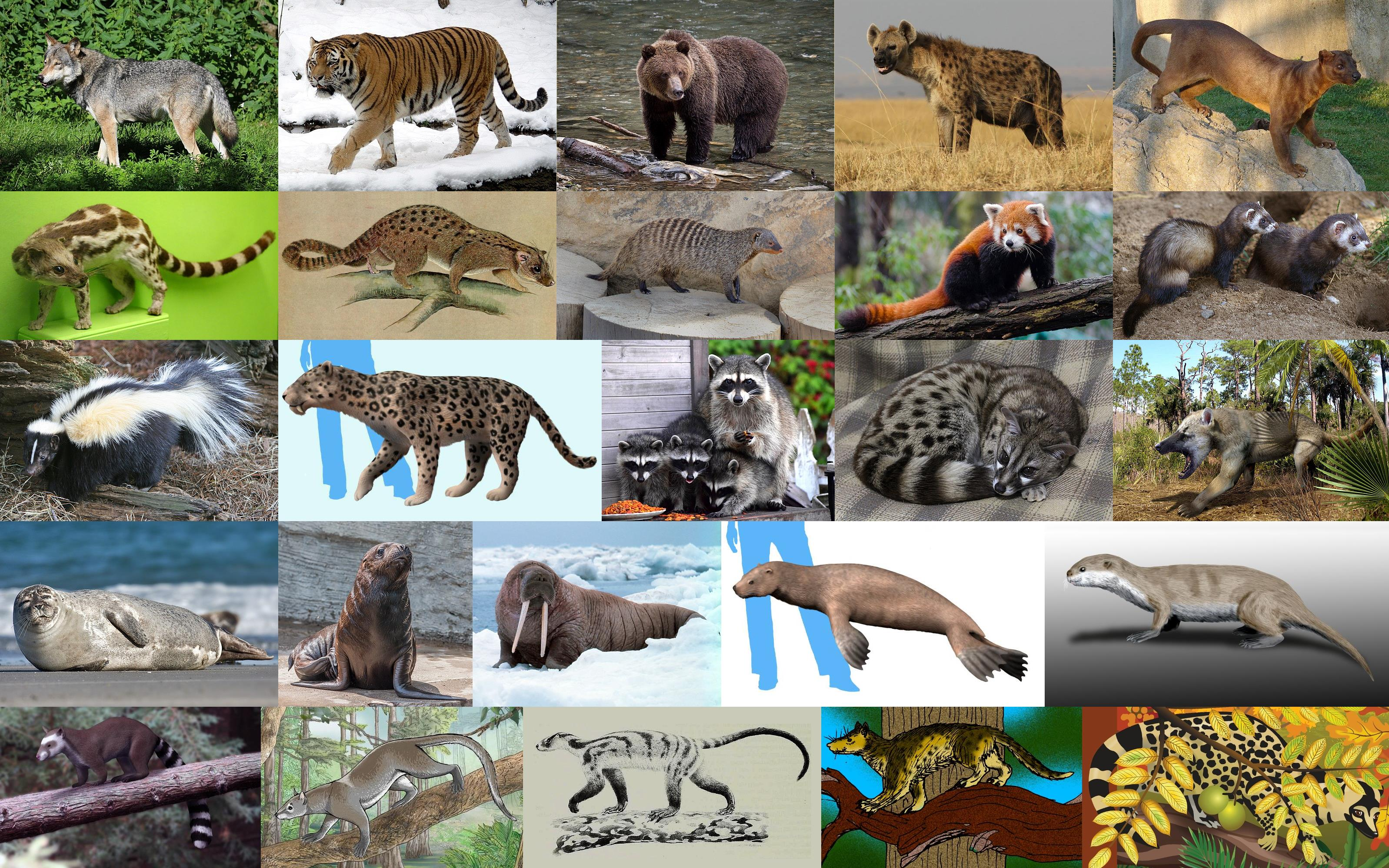
- Diversity of Carnivoramorpha

Scientific classification
- Kingdom: Animalia
- Phylum: Chordata
- Class: Mammalia
- Mirorder: Ferae
- Clade: Pan-Carnivora
- Clade: Carnivoramorpha; Wyss & Flynn, 1993

Subgroups
- [see classification]

Synonyms
- Carnivora (Rose, 2012); Carnivoramoepha (Matsui & Kimura, 2022); Carnivoramomorpha (Wyss & Flynn, 1993)

= Carnivoramorpha =

Carnivoramorpha Temporal range: 66.043–0 Ma early Paleocene to present

Clade of carnivores

Carnivoramorpha ("carnivoran-like forms") is a clade of placental mammals within the larger clade Pan-Carnivora from the mirorder Ferae, that includes the modern order Carnivora as well as extinct stem-group relatives that are more closely related to carnivorans proper than to "creodonts". However, recent analyses suggest carnivoramorphans are polyphyletic with Viverravidae being basal to the clade containing hyaenodonts, oxyaenids and carnivoraforms.

== General characteristics ==
The common feature for members of this clade is the presence of the carnassial teeth. The carnassial teeth of the Carnivoramorpha are upper premolar P4 and lower molar m1.

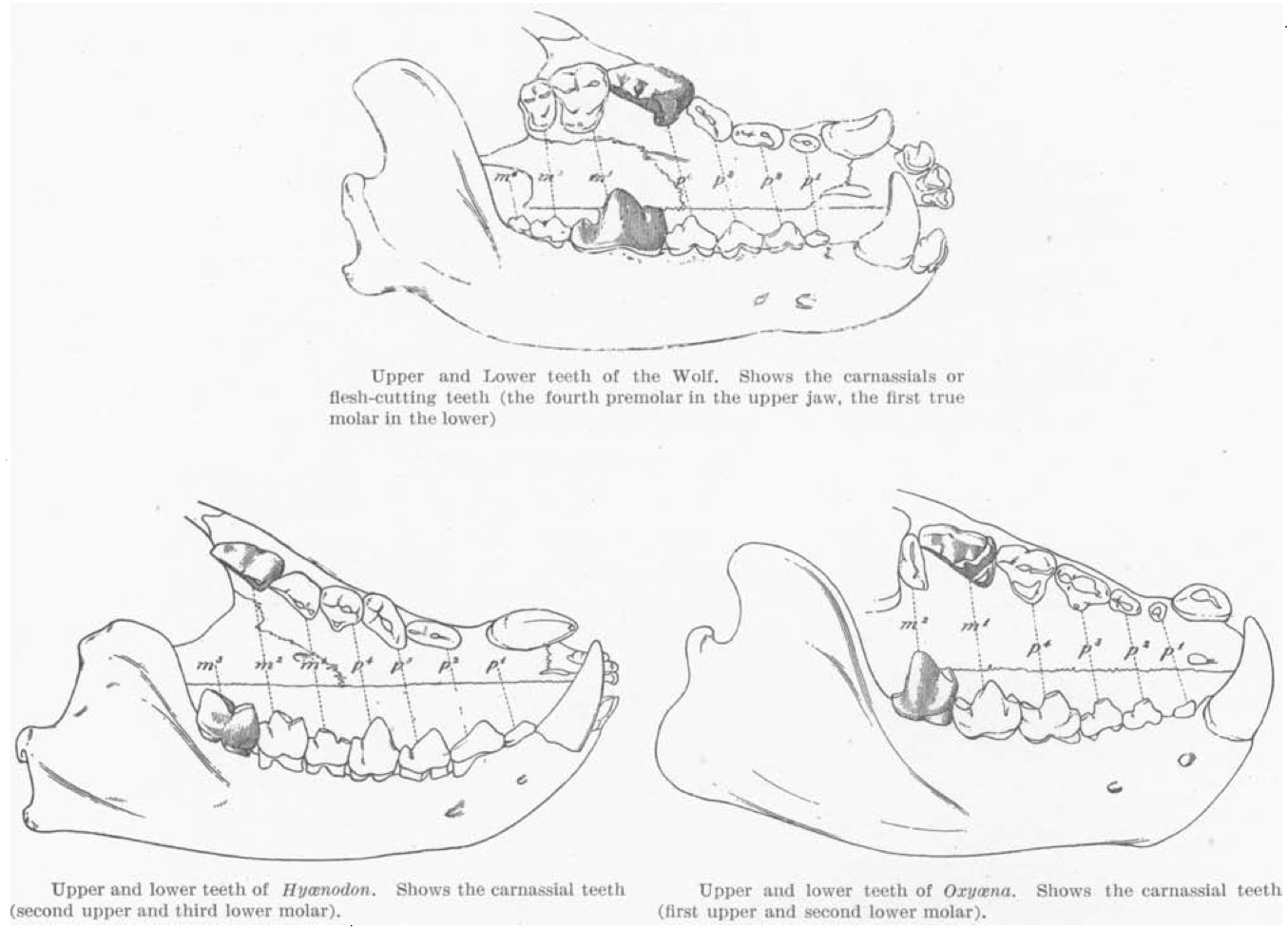
Comparison of carnassial teeth of a carnivoran (wolf), a hyaenodontid (Hyaenodon) and an oxyaenid (Oxyaena)

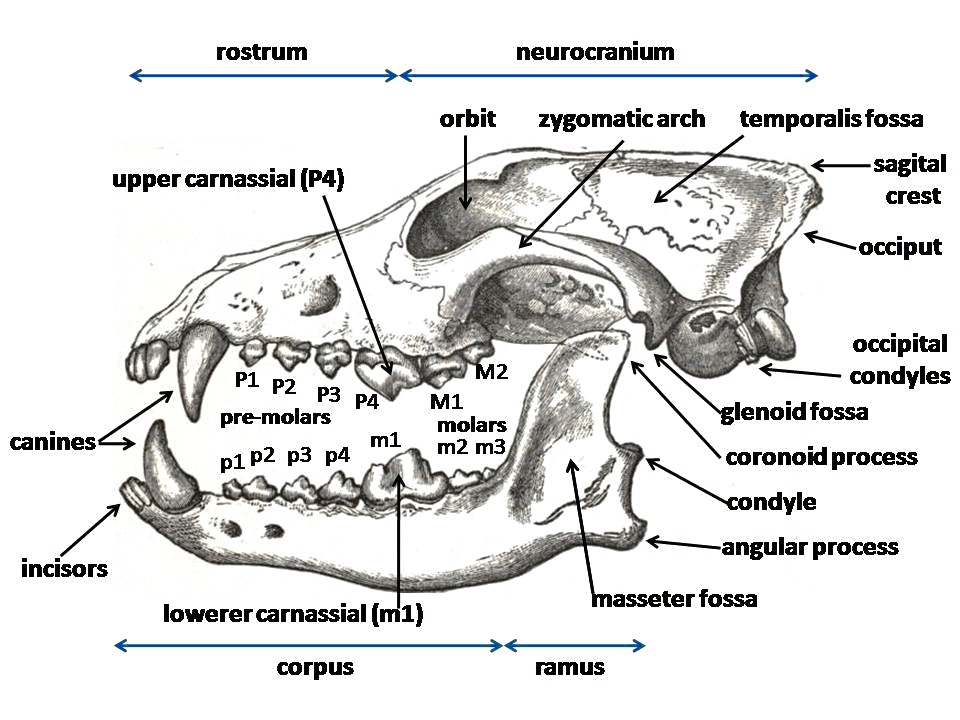
diagram of a wolf skull with key features labelled

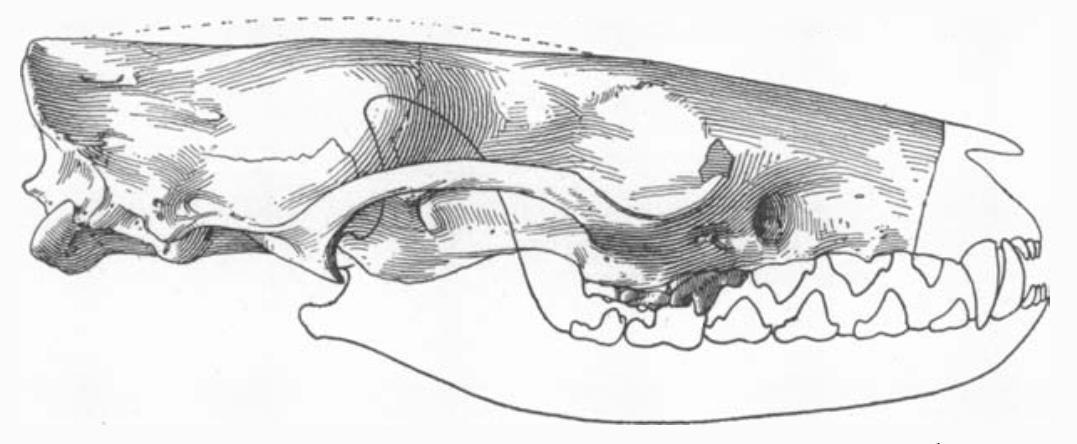
skull of Viverravus minutus

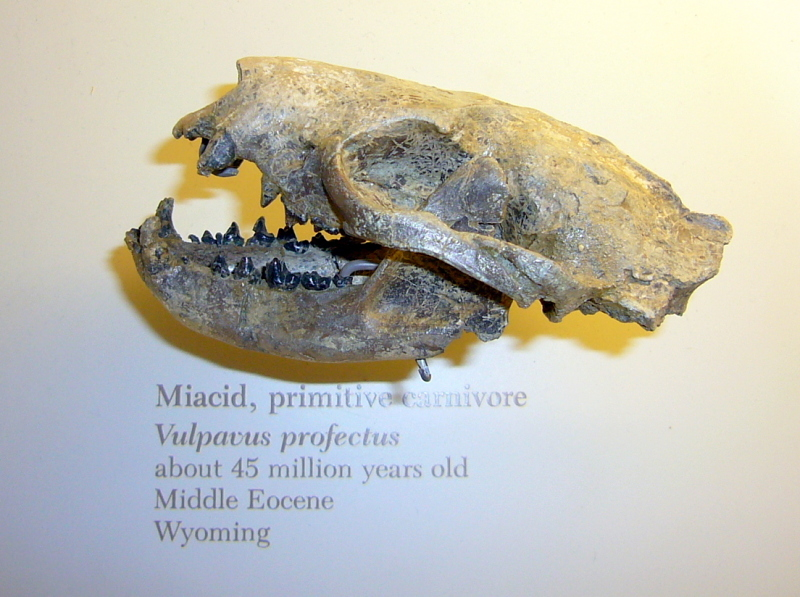
skull of Vulpavus profectus

== Classification and phylogeny ==
=== Traditional classification ===
- Clade: Carnivoramorpha (Wyss & Flynn, 1993) [carnivorans + all basal clades to Carnivora, but without creodonts]
  - Order: Carnivora (Bowdich, 1821) (carnivorans)
    - Suborder: Caniformia (Kretzoi, 1943) ("dog-like" carnivorans)
    - Suborder: Feliformia (Kretzoi, 1945) ("cat-like" carnivorans)
    - Incertae sedis:
      - Genus: †Palaeogale (von Meyer, 1846)
  - Superfamily: †Miacoidea (Cope, 1880)
    - Family: †Miacidae (Cope, 1880)
    - Family: †Viverravidae (Wortman & Matthew, 1899)
    - Incertae sedis:
      - †"Sinopa" insectivorus (Cope, 1872)
  - Incertae sedis:
    - Genus: †Ravenictis (Fox & Youzwyshyn, 1994)
    - †Carnivoramorpha sp. [UALVP 31176] (Fox & Youzwyshyn, 1994)

=== Revised classification ===
Recent phylogenetic studies indicate that the superfamily Miacoidea and family Miacidae are paraphyletic, with "miacids" being more closely related to carnivorans than to viverravids. In 2010 Flynn, Finarelli & Spaulding named a new clade Carnivoraformes within Carnivoramorpha, containing carnivorans and "miacids" but not viverravids. The authors defined Carnivoraformes as the clade containing Carnivora and all taxa that are more closely related to Carnivora (represented by Canis lupus) than to viverravids (represented by Viverravus gracilis). More recent analysis have questioned the relation of viverravids to carnivoraforms, suggesting carnivoramorphans wasn't a monophyletic group.

- Clade: Carnivoramorpha (Wyss & Flynn, 1993) [= Carnivora (sensu lato)]
  - Clade: Carnivoraformes (Flynn, 2010) [= Clade "A"]
    - Genus: †Africtis (Mattingly, 2020)
    - Genus: †Dawsonicyon (Spaulding, Flynn & Stucky, 2010)
    - Genus: †Miacis (Cope, 1872)
    - (unranked): Clade "B"
      - Family: †Quercygalidae (Kretzoi, 1945)
      - (unranked): †Gracilocyon/Oodectes clade
        - Genus: †Eogale (Beard & Dawson, 2009)
        - Genus: †Gracilocyon ^{(paraphyletic genus)} (Smith & Smith, 2010)
        - Genus: †Oodectes ^{(paraphyletic genus)} (Wortman, 1901)
        - Genus: †Paramiacis (Mathis, 1985)
        - Genus: †Paroodectes (Springhorn, 1980)
        - Incertae sedis:
          - †"Miacis" sp. [CM 67873 & CM 77299] (Beard & Dawson, 2009)
      - Genus: †Messelogale (Springhorn, 2000)
      - Genus: †Miocyon (Matthew, 1909)
      - Genus: †Simamphicyon (Viret, 1942)
      - Genus: †Uintacyon ^{(paraphyletic genus)} (Leidy, 1872)
      - Genus: †Xinyuictis (Zheng, 1975)
      - Genus: †Zodiocyon (Tong & Wang, 2006)
    - (unranked): Clade "C"
      - Genus: †Dormaalocyon (Solé, 2014)
      - (unranked): †Vulpavus clade
        - Genus: †Palaearctonyx (Matthew, 1909)
        - Genus: †Vassacyon (Matthew, 1909)
        - Genus: †Vulpavus ^{(paraphyletic genus)} (Marsh, 1871)
      - Incertae sedis:
        - †"Miacis" deutschi (Gingerich, 1983)
        - †"Miacis" exiguus (Matthew & Granger, 1915)
    - (unranked): Clade "D"
      - Order: Carnivora [sensu stricto] (Bowdich, 1821) (carnivorans) [= Clade "E"]
      - Genus: †Ceruttia (Tomiya, 2013)
      - Genus: †Harpalodon (Marsh, 1872)
      - Genus: †Lycarion (Matthew, 1909)
      - Genus: †Neovulpavus (Wortman, 1901)
      - Genus: †Procynodictis (Wortman & Matthew, 1899)
      - Genus: †Prodaphaenus (Wortman & Matthew, 1899)
      - Genus: †Tapocyon (Stock, 1934)
      - Genus: †Walshius (Tomiya, 2013)
      - Incertae sedis:
        - †"Miacis" gracilis (Clark, 1939)
        - †"Miacis" hargeri (Wortman, 1901)
        - †"Miacis" invictus (Matthew & Granger, 1925)
        - †"Miacis" lushiensis (Chow, 1975)
        - †Carnivoraformes sp. [SDSNH 49600] (Poust & Tomiya, 2024)
    - Incertae sedis:
      - †"Miacis" boqinghensis (Huang, 1999)
      - †"Miacis" hookwayi (Stock, 1934)
      - †"Miacis" latidens (Matthew & Granger, 1915)
      - †"Miacis" petilus (Gingerich, 1983)
      - †Carnivoraformes undet. Genus A (Tomiya, 2013)
      - †Carnivoraformes undet. Genus B (Tomiya, 2013)
    - ichnotaxa of Carnivoraformes:
      - Ichnogenus: †Falcatipes (Sargeant & Langston, 1994)
  - (unranked): †Viverravidae [sensu lato]
    - Superfamily: †Viverravoidea (Wortman & Matthew, 1899)
      - Family: †Viverravidae [sensu stricto] (Wortman & Matthew, 1899)
    - Genus: †Ravenictis (Fox & Youzwyshyn, 1994)
    - Incertae sedis:
      - †Carnivoramorpha sp. [UALVP 50993 & UALVP 50994] (Fox, Scott & Rankin, 2010)
  - Incertae sedis:
    - †"Sinopa" insectivorus (Cope, 1872)
    - †Carnivoramorpha sp. [UALVP 31176] (Fox & Youzwyshyn, 1994)
    - †Carnivoramorpha sp. [USNM 538395] (Rose, 2012)

== See also ==
- Mammal classification
- Ferae
- Miacoidea
