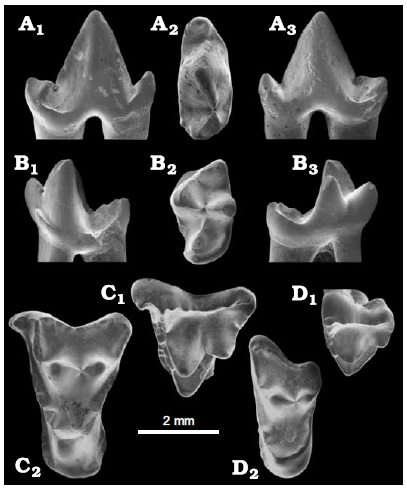
- teeth of Gracilocyon solei
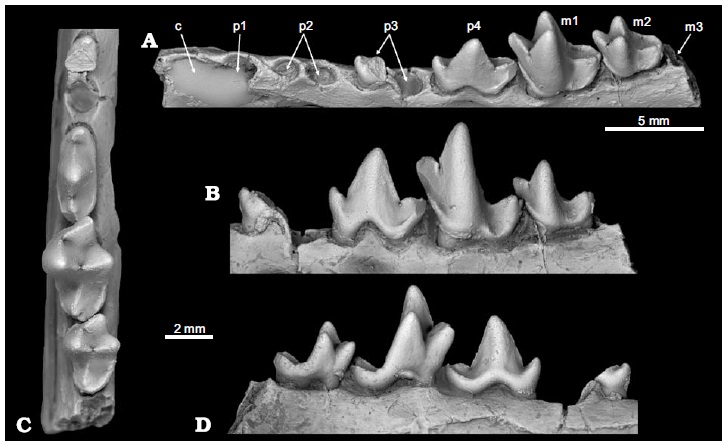
- teeth and lower jaw fragment of Gracilocyon winkleri

Scientific classification
- Domain: Eukaryota
- Kingdom: Animalia
- Phylum: Chordata
- Class: Mammalia
- Clade: Pan-Carnivora
- Clade: Carnivoramorpha
- Clade: Carnivoraformes
- Genus: †Gracilocyon; Smith & Smith, 2010

Type species
- †Gracilocyon winkleri Gingerich, 1983

Species
- †G. igniculus (Beard & Dawson, 2009); †G. rosei (Heinrich, 2008); †G. rundlei (Hooker, 2010); †G. solei (Smith & Smith, 2010); †G. winkleri (Gingerich, 1983)

Synonyms
- synonyms of genus: Grucihcyon (Smith & Smith, 2010); synonyms of species: G. igniculus: Miacis igniculus (Beard & Dawson, 2009); G. rosei: Miacis rosei (Heinrich, 2008); G. rundlei: Miacis rundlei (Hooker, 2010); G. solei: Miacis solei (Smith & Smith, 2010); G. winkleri: Grucihcyon winkleri (Smith & Smith, 2010); Miacis winkleri (Gingerich, 1983)

= Gracilocyon =

Gracilocyon Temporal range: 57.2–50.5 Ma late Paleocene to early Eocene

Extinct genus of carnivores

Gracilocyon ("gracile dog") is an extinct paraphyletic genus of placental mammals from clade Carnivoraformes, that lived in North America and Europe from the late Paleocene to the early Eocene.

== See also ==
- Mammal classification
- Carnivoraformes
- Miacidae
