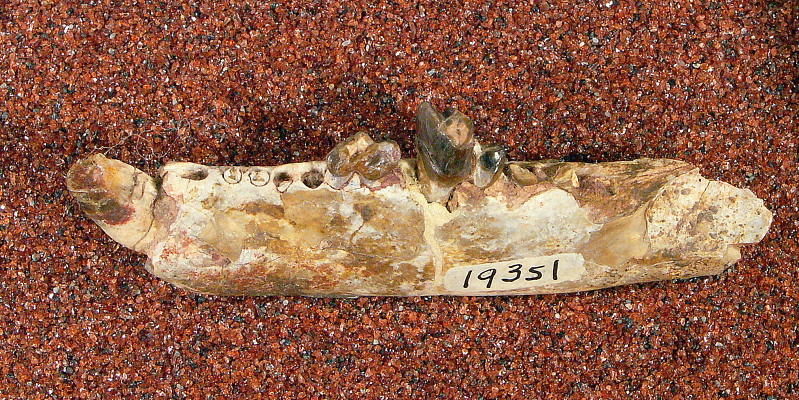
- lower jaw of Uintacyon asodes

Scientific classification
- Kingdom: Animalia
- Phylum: Chordata
- Class: Mammalia
- Clade: Pan-Carnivora
- Clade: Carnivoramorpha
- Clade: Carnivoraformes
- Genus: †Uintacyon; Leidy, 1872

Type species
- †Uintacyon edax Leidy, 1872

Species
- †U. acutus (Thorpe, 1923); †U. asodes (Gazin, 1952); †U. edax (Leidy, 1872); †U. gingerichi (Heinrich, 2008); †U. hookeri (Solé, 2014); †U. jugulans (Matthew, 1909); †U. massetericus (Cope, 1882); †U. rudis (Rose, 1981); †U. vorax (Leidy, 1872)

Synonyms
- synonyms of genus: Triacodon (Cope, 1872); synonyms of species: U. edax: Miacis edax (Cope, 1884); U. massetericus: Didymictis massetericus (Cope, 1882); Viverravus massetericus (Hay, 1902); U. rudis: Uintacyon massetericus rudis (Matthew & Granger, 1915); U. vorax: Miacis vorax (Cope, 1884)

= Uintacyon =

Uintacyon Temporal range: 55.2–39.7 Ma early to middle Eocene

Extinct genus of carnivores

Uintacyon ("dog of the Uinta Mountains") is an extinct paraphyletic genus of placental mammals from clade Carnivoraformes, that lived in North America from the early to middle Eocene.
