= Xinyuictis =

Xinyuictis Temporal range: 56.0–33.9 Ma early to late Eocene

Scientific classification
- Domain: Eukaryota
- Kingdom: Animalia
- Phylum: Chordata
- Class: Mammalia
- Clade: Pan-Carnivora
- Clade: Carnivoramorpha
- Clade: Carnivoraformes
- Genus: †Xinyuictis; Zheng, 1975

Type species
- †Xinyuictis tenuis Zheng, 1975

Species
- †X. tenuis (Zheng, 1975); †X. thailandicus (Ducrocq, 1992)

Synonyms
- synonyms of genus: Xinyüictis (Zheng, 1975); Yinyuictis (Huang, 1999); synonyms of species: X. tenuis: Miacis tenuis (Gingerich, 1983); Yinyuictis tenuis (Huang, 1999); X. thailandicus: Miacis thailandicus (Ducrocq, 1992)

Extinct genus of carnivores

Xinyuictis ("weasel from Xinyu") is an extinct genus of placental mammals from clade Carnivoraformes, that lived in Asia from the early to late Eocene.
