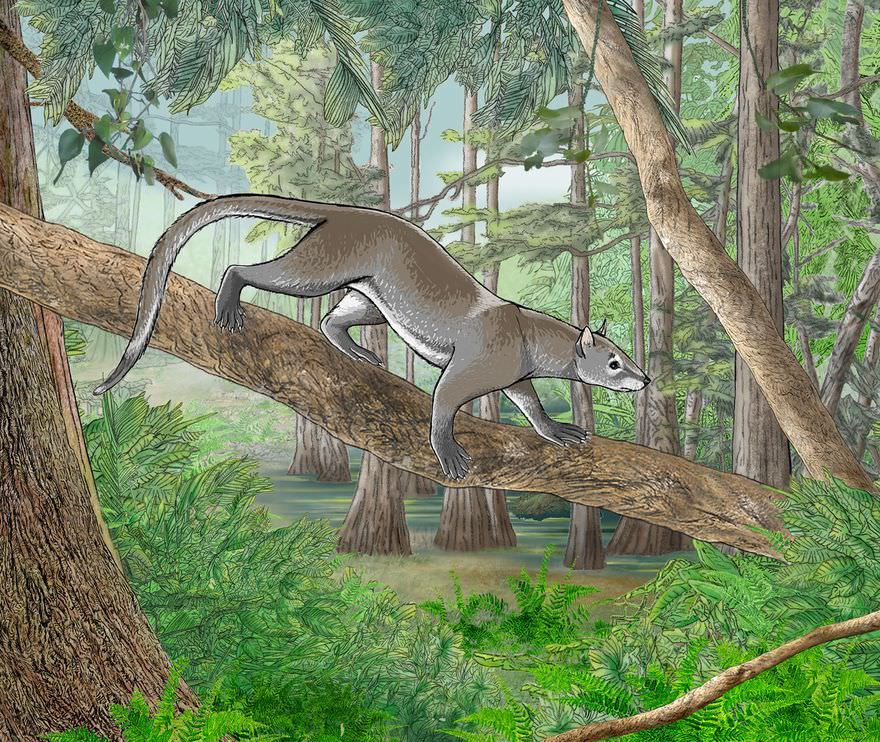
- Life restoration of Dormaalocyon latouri

Scientific classification
- Kingdom: Animalia
- Phylum: Chordata
- Class: Mammalia
- Clade: Pan-Carnivora
- Clade: Carnivoramorpha
- Clade: Carnivoraformes
- Genus: †Dormaalocyon; Solé, 2014

Type species
- †Dormaalocyon latouri Quinet, 1966

Synonyms
- synonyms of species: D. latouri: Miacis latouri (Quinet, 1966)

= Dormaalocyon =

Dormaalocyon Temporal range: 56.0–55.2 Ma Early Eocene

Extinct genus of carnivores

Dormaalocyon ("dog from Dormaal") is an extinct genus of placental mammals from clade Carnivoraformes, that lived in Europe during the early Eocene. The type species, Dormaalocyon latouri, was discovered when fossils were unearthed in the village of Dormaal, near Zoutleeuw, in the Belgian province of Flemish Brabant.

It is considered one of the earliest ancestors to modern-day carnivoraforms.
