= Neovulpavus =

Neovulpavus Temporal range: Ypresian–Lutetian

Scientific classification
- Kingdom: Animalia
- Phylum: Chordata
- Class: Mammalia
- Clade: Carnivoraformes
- Genus: †Neovulpavus; Wortman, 1901

Type species
- Neovulpavus washakius Wortman, 1901

Other species
- Neovulpavus mccarrolli Tomiya et al., 2021

Extinct genus of mammal

Neovulpavus is an extinct genus of mammal belonging to the clade Ferae that lived in North America during the Ypresian and Lutetian stages of the Eocene epoch.

== Description ==
Neovulpavus mccarrolli is distinguished from the type species, Neovulpavus washakius, in that the former has a slanting of the posteromedial edge of the trochlea of the humerus, a humeral lesser tuberosity lacking a distally extending ridge, and a lateral border of its astragalar trochlea that relative to its medial border is taller dorsoventrally. N. mccarrolli also lacks an anterior cingular cuspulid on its P_{3}.
