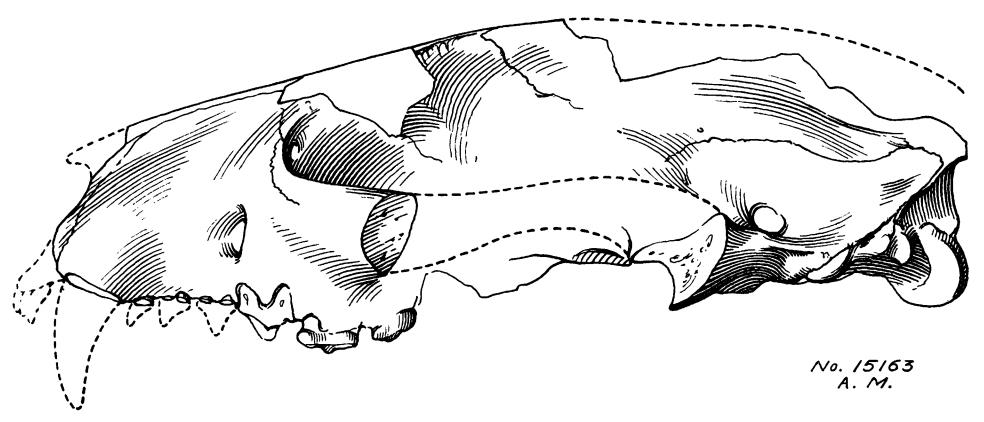
- Skull of Vassacyon promicrodon

Scientific classification
- Kingdom: Animalia
- Phylum: Chordata
- Class: Mammalia
- Clade: Pan-Carnivora
- Clade: Carnivoramorpha
- Clade: Carnivoraformes
- Genus: †Vassacyon; Matthew, 1909

Type species
- †Vassacyon promicrodon Wortman & Matthew, 1899

Species
- †V. bowni (Heinrich, 2008); †V. prieuri (Solé, 2016); †V. promicrodon (Wortman & Matthew, 1899); †V. taxidiotis (Solé, 2013)

Synonyms
- synonyms of species: V. promicrodon: Prodaphaenus promicrodon (Wortman, 1901); Uintacyon promicrodon (Wortman & Matthew, 1899)

= Vassacyon =

Vassacyon Temporal range: 57.2–50.5 Ma late Paleocene to early Eocene

Extinct genus of carnivores

Vassacyon ("wasatchian dog") is an extinct genus of placental mammals from clade Carnivoraformes, that lived in North America and Europe from the late Paleocene to early Eocene. It is considered the largest of the early Eocene mammals.
