= Messelogale =

Messelogale Temporal range: 47.8–46.3 Ma middle Eocene

Scientific classification
- Domain: Eukaryota
- Kingdom: Animalia
- Phylum: Chordata
- Class: Mammalia
- Clade: Pan-Carnivora
- Clade: Carnivoramorpha
- Clade: Carnivoraformes
- Genus: †Messelogale; Springhorn, 2000

Type species
- †Messelogale kessleri Springhorn, 1982

Synonyms
- synonyms of species: M. kessleri: Miacis kessleri (Springhorn, 1982)

Extinct genus of carnivores

Messelogale ("weasel from Messel") is an extinct genus of placental mammals from clade Carnivoraformes, that lived in Europe during the middle Eocene.
