= Africtis =

Africtis Temporal range: Rupelian

Scientific classification
- Kingdom: Animalia
- Phylum: Chordata
- Class: Mammalia
- Genus: †Africtis
- Species: †A. sirtensis

Binomial name
- †Africtis sirtensis Mattingly et al., 2020

Extinct genus of carnivoramorphs

Africtis is an extinct genus of carnivoramorph that inhabited Libya during the Rupelian. It is a monotypic genus that contains a single species, Africtis sirtensis.
