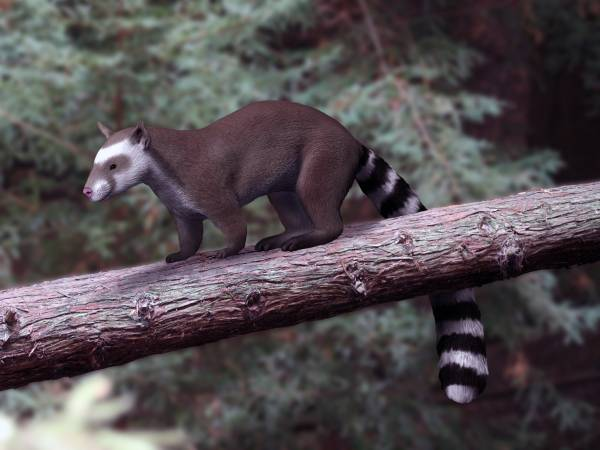
- Life restoration of Tapocyon robustus
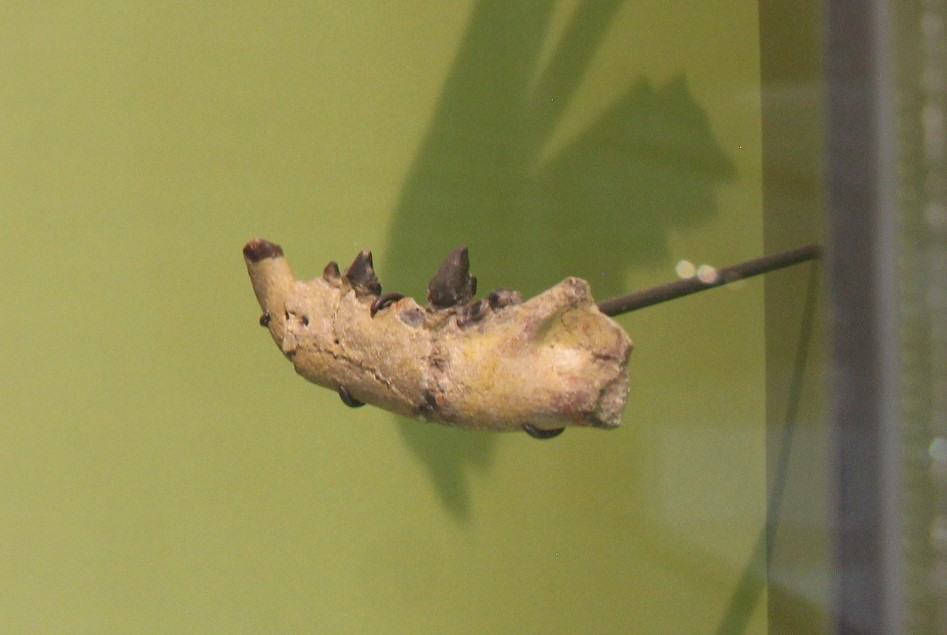
- Replica of T. robustus lower jaw at the Natural History Museum of Los Angeles County

Scientific classification
- Domain: Eukaryota
- Kingdom: Animalia
- Phylum: Chordata
- Class: Mammalia
- Clade: Pan-Carnivora
- Clade: Carnivoramorpha
- Clade: Carnivoraformes
- Genus: †Tapocyon; Stock, 1934

Type species
- †Tapocyon robustus Peterson, 1919

Species
- †T. dawsonae (Wesley & Flynn, 2003); †T. robustus (Peterson, 1919)

Synonyms
- synonyms of species: T. robustus: Miacis robustus (Gazin, 1956); Prodaphaenus robustus (Peterson, 1919); Tapocyon occidentalis (Stock, 1934); Uintacyon robustus

= Tapocyon =

Tapocyon Temporal range: 46.2–39.7 Ma middle Eocene

Extinct genus of carnivores

Tapocyon ("dog from Tapo Canyon") is an extinct genus of placental mammals from clade Carnivoraformes, that lived in North America during the middle Eocene. Tapocyon was about the size of a coyote and is believed to have been a good climber that spent a lot of time in trees.
