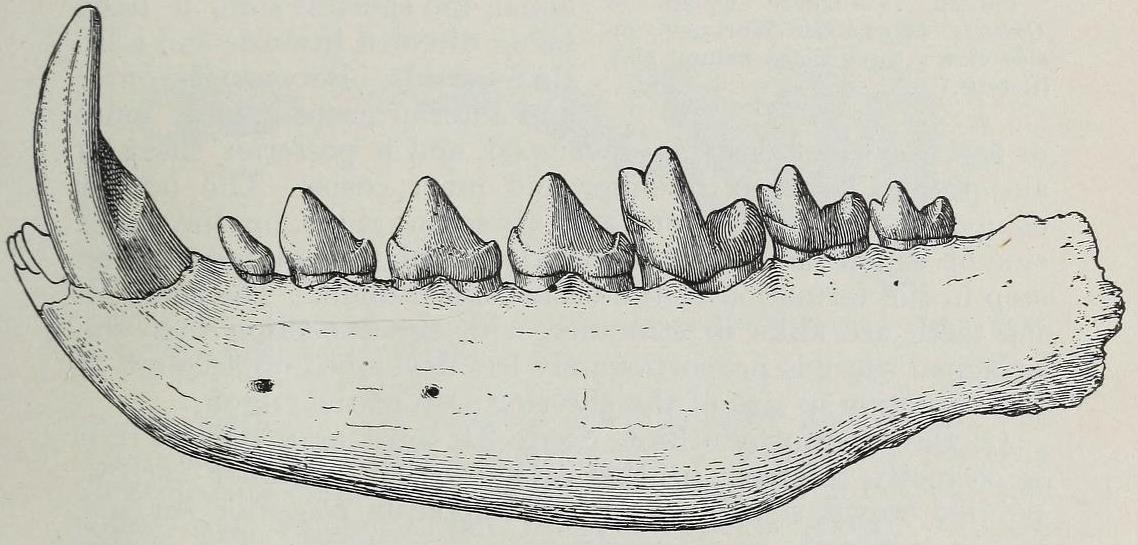
- part of lower jaw of Oodectes herpestoides

Scientific classification
- Kingdom: Animalia
- Phylum: Chordata
- Class: Mammalia
- Clade: Pan-Carnivora
- Clade: Carnivoramorpha
- Clade: Carnivoraformes
- Genus: †Oodectes; Wortman, 1901

Type species
- †Oodectes herpestoides Wortman, 1901

Species
- †O. herpestoides (Wortman, 1901); †O. jepseni (Guthrie, 1967); †O. proximus (Matthew, 1909); †O. pugnax (Wortman & Matthew, 1899)

Synonyms
- synonyms of genus: Oödectes (Wortman, 1901)[misspelling]; Paeneprolimnocyon (Guthrie, 1967); synonyms of species: O. herpestoides: Paeneprolimnocyon amissadomus (Guthrie, 1967); Triacodon nanus (Marsh, 1872); O. jepseni: Miacis jepseni (Guthrie, 1967); Paeneprolimnocyon iudei (Guthrie, 1967); Prolimnocyon iudei (Guthrie, 1967); O. pugnax: Uintacyon pugnax (Wortman & Matthew, 1899)

= Oodectes =

Oodectes Temporal range: 53.0–46.2 Ma early to middle Eocene

Extinct genus of carnivores

Oodectes ("egg biter") is an extinct paraphyletic genus of placental mammals from clade Carnivoraformes, that lived in North America from the early to middle Eocene.
