= Ravenictis =

Ravenictis Temporal range: 64.7–64.3 Ma early Palaeocene

Scientific classification
- Kingdom: Animalia
- Phylum: Chordata
- Class: Mammalia
- Clade: Pan-Carnivora
- Clade: Carnivoramorpha
- Genus: †Ravenictis; Fox & Youzwyshyn, 1994

Type species
- †Ravenictis krausei Fox & Youzwyshyn, 1994

Extinct genus of carnivorous mammal

Ravenictis ("weasel from Ravenscrag") is an extinct monotypic genus of placental mammals from clade Carnivoramorpha, that lived in North America during the early Palaeocene.

== Etymology ==
The generic name Ravenictis derives from Ravenscrag, Saskatchewan, which is located close to where the holotype was found, and the Greek word iktis, meaning marten or weasel. The specific epithet of the type species, Ravenictis krausei, honours the palaeontologist David W. Krause.
