= William Diller Matthew =

American paleontologist

William Diller Matthew FRS
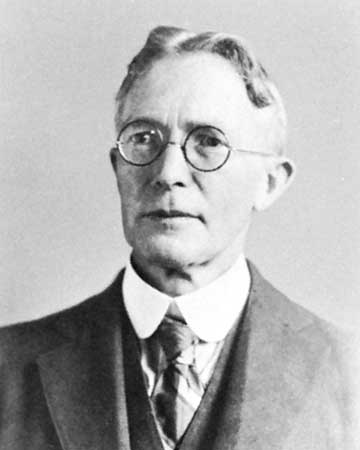
- Born: 19 February 1871; Saint John, New Brunswick, Canada
- Died: 24 September 1930 (aged 59); San Francisco, California
- Education: University of New Brunswick,Columbia University (PhD 1894)
- Known for: Article on "Climate and evolution" hostile to continental drift
- Parents: George Frederic Matthew (father); Katherine (Diller) Matthew (mother)
- Scientific career
- Fields: Vertebrate paleontology: mammal fossils
- Institutions: American Museum of Natural History, University of California Museum of Paleontology

William Diller Matthew FRS (19 February 1871 – 24 September 1930) was a vertebrate paleontologist who worked primarily on mammal fossils, although he also published a few early papers on mineralogy, petrological geology, one on botany, one on trilobites, and he described Tetraceratops insignis, which was much later suggested to be the oldest known (Early Permian) therapsid.

Matthew was born in Saint John, New Brunswick, the son of George Frederic Matthew and Katherine (Diller) Matthew. His father was an amateur geologist and paleontologist who instilled his son with an abiding interest in the earth sciences. Matthew received an A.B. at the University of New Brunswick in 1889 and then earned his Ph.D. at Columbia University in 1894.

Matthew was curator of the American Museum of Natural History from the mid-1890s to 1927, and director of the University of California Museum of Paleontology from 1927 to 1930. He was an elected member of the American Philosophical Society. He was the father of Margaret Matthew Colbert, an artist, illustrator, and sculptor who specialized in visualizing extinct species.

== Asia hypothesis ==
Matthew believed that the first humans had originated in Asia, he visited Asia by taking part in the Central Asiatic expeditions. Matthew was also well known for his deeply influential 1915 article "Climate and evolution", Matthews theory was that climate change was how organisms came to live where we find them today in opposition to the theory of continental drift. His basic premise was that cyclical changes in global climate, along with the prevailing tendency for mammals to disperse from north to south, account for the odd geographic patterns of living mammals. He believed that humans and many other groups of modern mammals first evolved in the northern areas of the globe, especially central Asia because of the shifting climatic circumstances; Matthew firmly placed hominid origins in central Asia as he thought that the high plateau of Tibet was the forcing ground of mammalian evolution.

== Selected works ==
- Fossil mammals of the Tertiary of northeastern Colorado: American Museum collection of 1898. Memoirs of the American Museum of Natural History; v. 1, pt. 7. American Museum of Natural History. 1901.
- The evolution of the horse. 1903.
- The Carnivora and Insectivora of the Bridger Basin, Middle Eocene. Memoirs of the American museum of natural history; vol. IX, pt. VI. E.W. Wheeler, printer. 1909.
- Dinosaurs with special reference to the American museum, collections. American museum of natural history, New York. Handbook series no.5. American museum of natural history. 1915.
