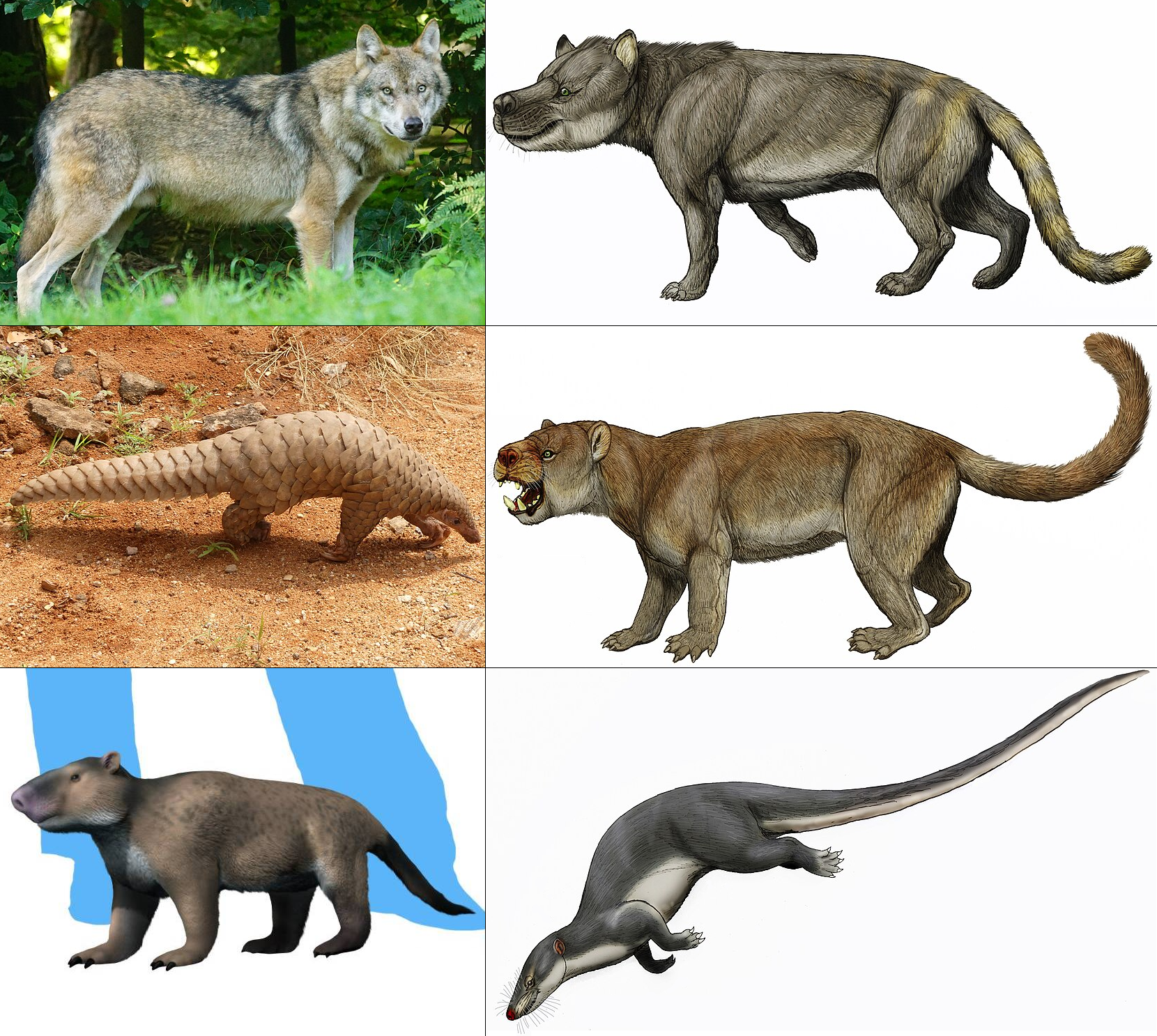

Scientific classification
- Kingdom: Animalia
- Phylum: Chordata
- Class: Mammalia
- Grandorder: Ferungulata
- Mirorder: Ferae; Linnaeus, 1758

Main subgroups
- Pholidotamorpha (pangolins and extinct relatives); Pan-Carnivora; †Hyaenodonta; †Oxyaenidae; Carnivoramorpha; For other groups, see text

Synonyms
- list of synonyms: Carnaria (Haeckel, 1866); Carnassia (Haeckel, 1895); Carnivora (Zagorodniuk, 2008); Carnivoramorpha (Kalandadze & Rautian, 1992); Ferina (Newman, 1843); Ostentoria (Amrine-Madsen, 2003); Rapacia (Newman, 1843); Sarcotheria (Haeckel, 1895)

= Ferae =

Ferae Temporal range: Paleocene to present 66–0 Ma Suspected Campanian origin

Clade of mammals consisting of carnivorans and pholidotes

Ferae (/ˈfɪəriː/ FEER-ee, Latin: [ˈfɛrae̯], "wild beasts") is a mirorder of placental mammals in grandorder Ferungulata, that groups together clades Pan-Carnivora (that includes carnivorans and their fossil relatives, such as hyaenodonts) and Pholidotamorpha (pangolins and their fossil relatives).

== General characteristics ==
=== In mirorder Ferae ===
The common features for members of this mirorder are:

- ossified tentorium cerebelli,
- fusion of the scaphoid and lunate bones in the wrist,
- and the a network of diploic venous channels throughout their cranial vault.

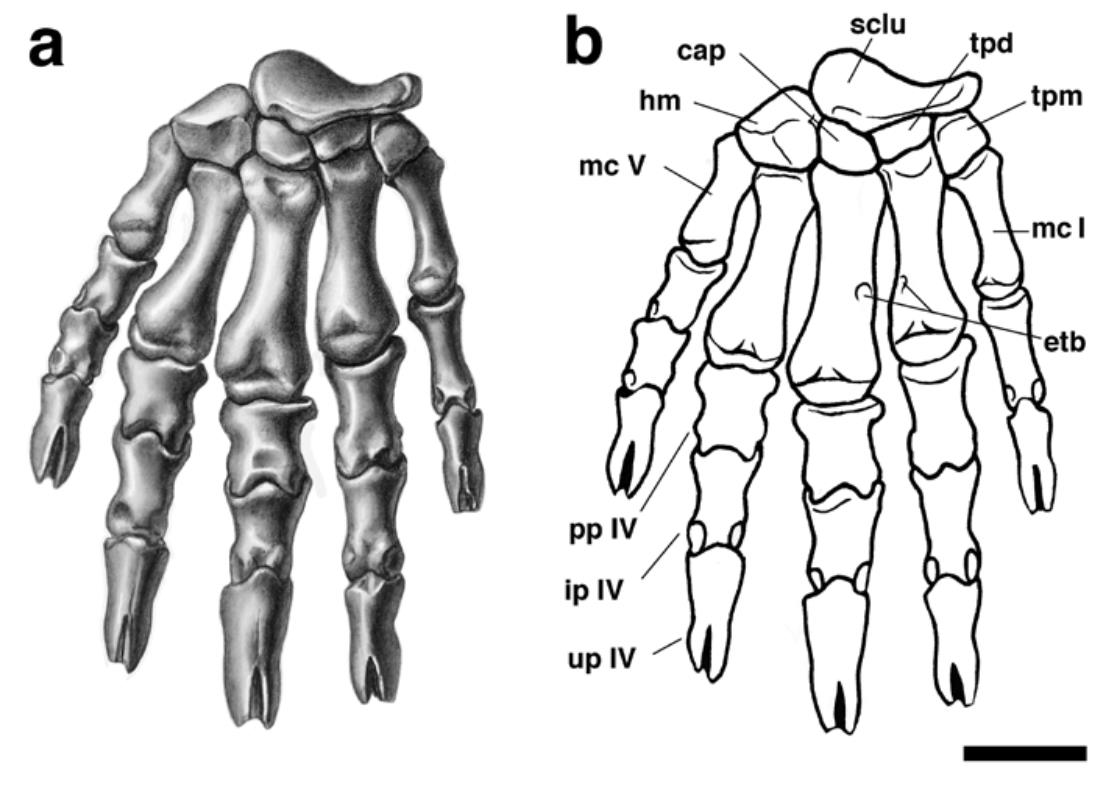
forefoot of Patriomanis americana

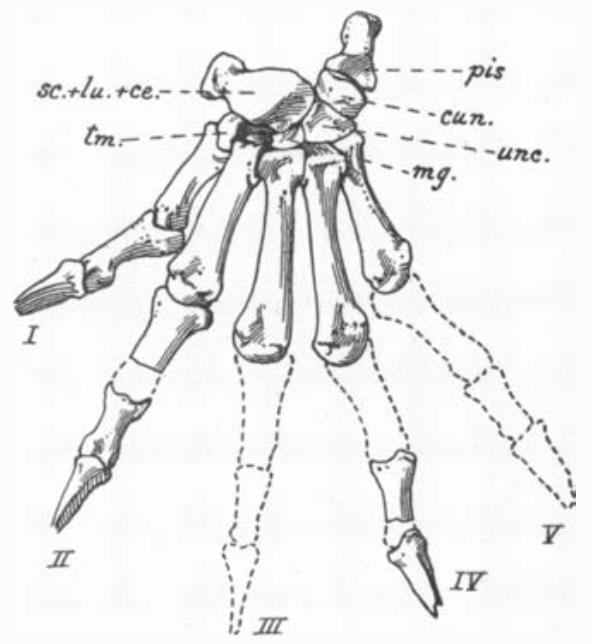
forefoot of Vulpavus profectus

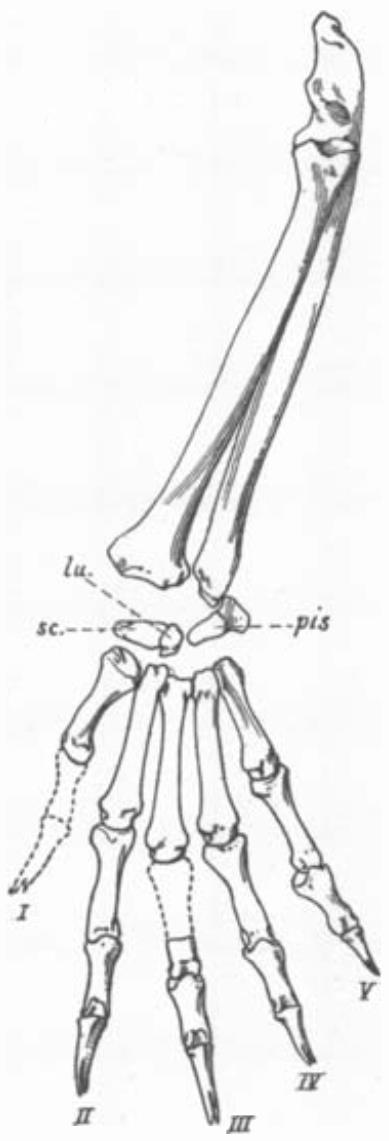
forefoot of
Thinocyon medius

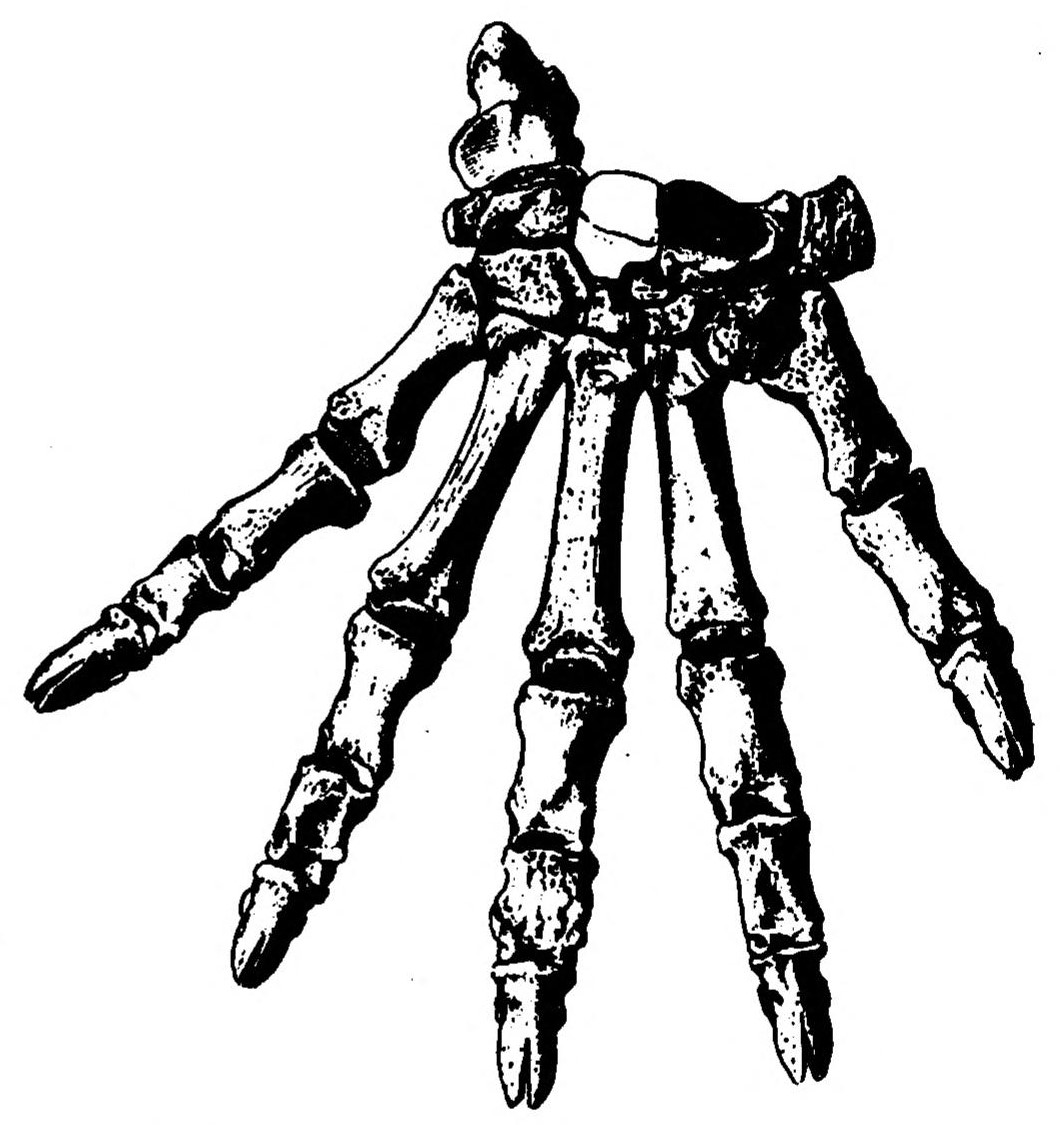
forefoot of Patriofelis ferox

=== In clade Pan-Carnivora ===
The common features for members of clade Pan-Carnivora are:

- binocular vision,
- sharp claws,
- heterodont teeth that are sharp and for cutting meat,
- canine teeth that are usually large, conical, pointed, thick and stress resistant,
- and presence of the carnassial teeth.

Carnassials are feature that allows distinguishing the Carnivoramorpha, Oxyaenodonta and Hyaenodonta from the other carnivorous placental mammals. However, these mammals are distinguished between themselves based on the position of the carnassial teeth and the number of molars. The carnassial teeth of the Carnivoramorpha are located in P_{4} and m_{1}, in Oxyaenodonta are M_{1} and m_{2}, and in Hyaenodonta and close relatives are M_{2} and m_{3}. This appears to be a case of a possible evolutionary convergent adaptation toward similar diet.

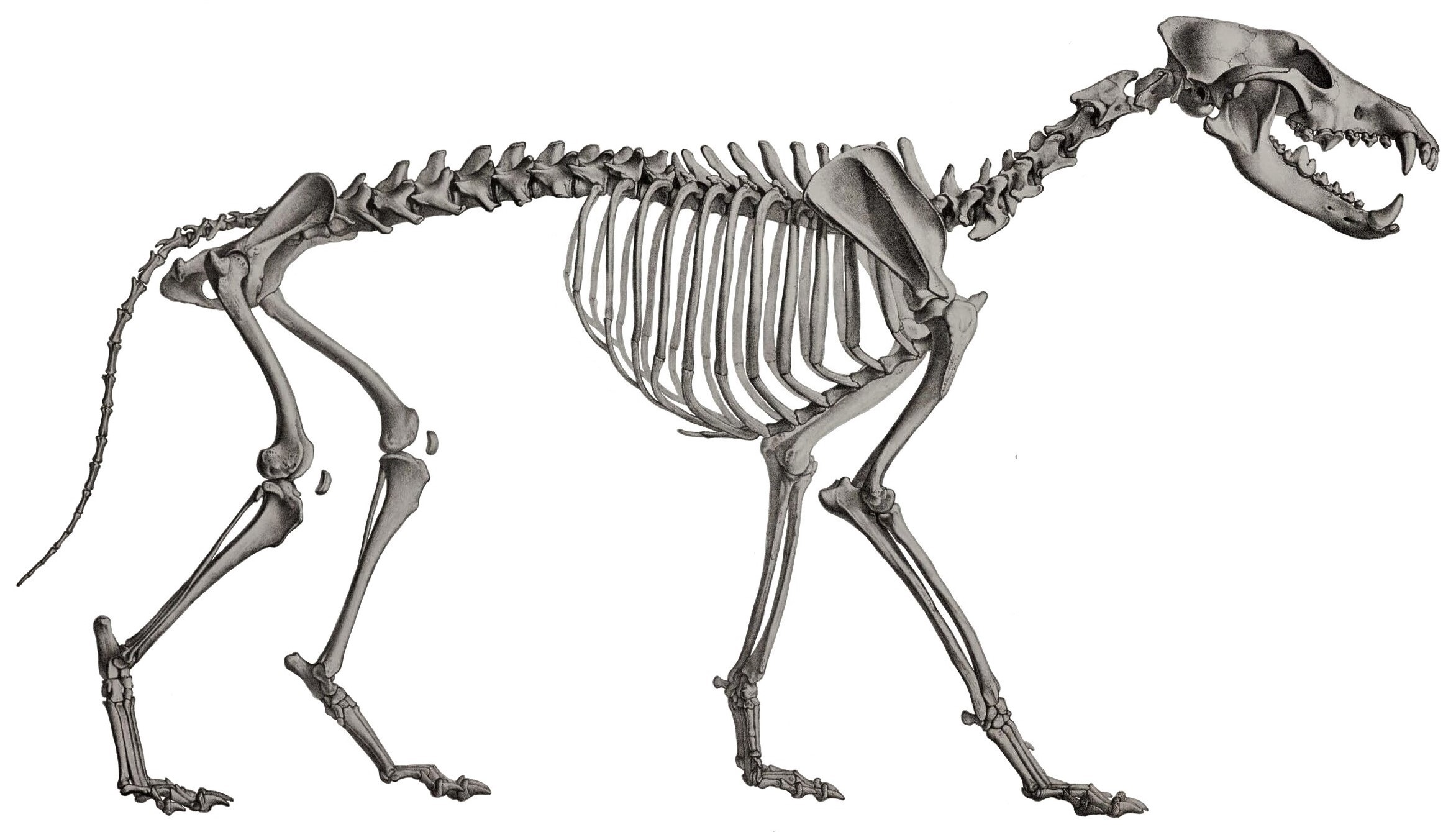
skeleton of wolf

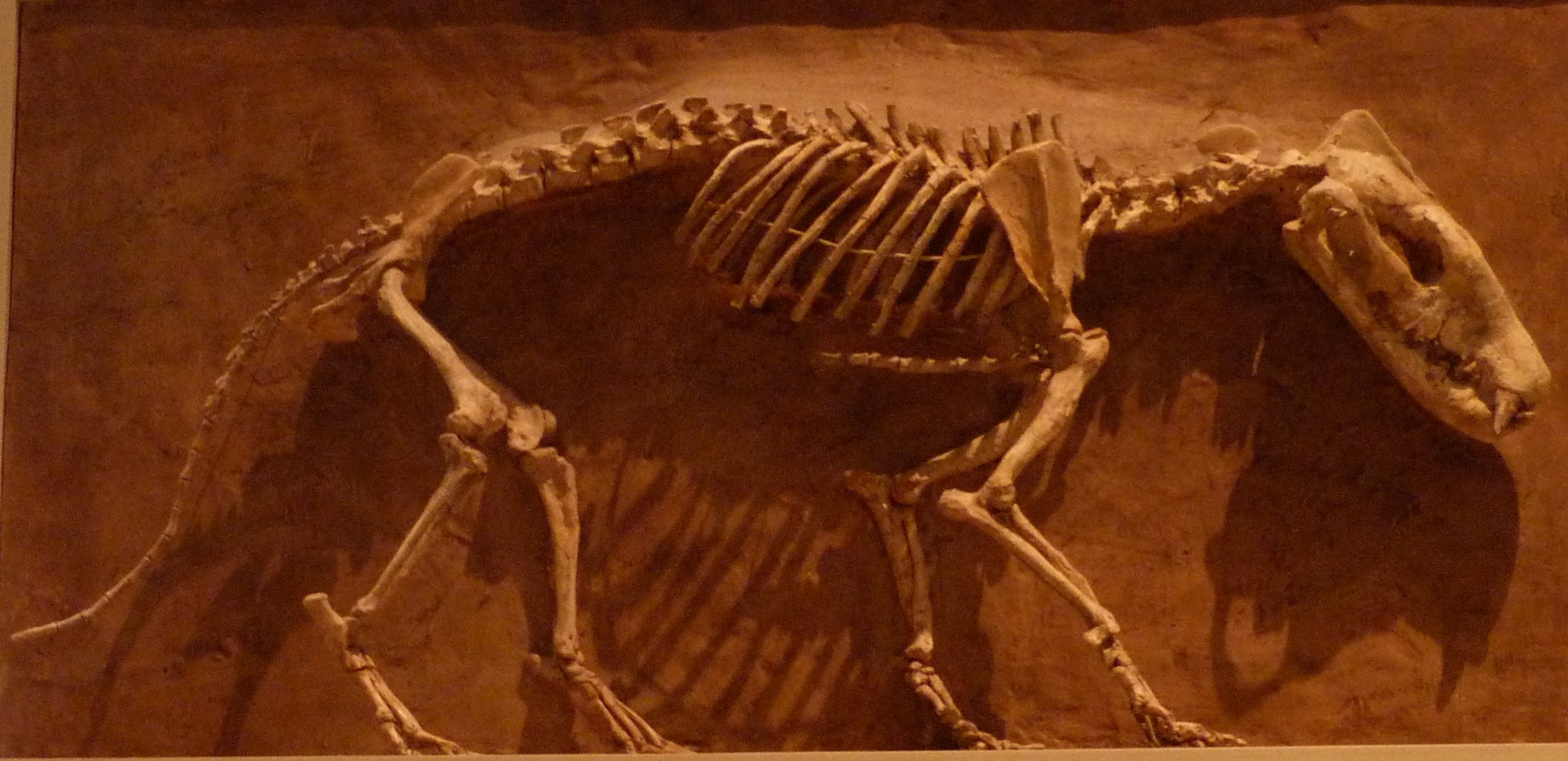
skeleton of Hyaenodon horridus

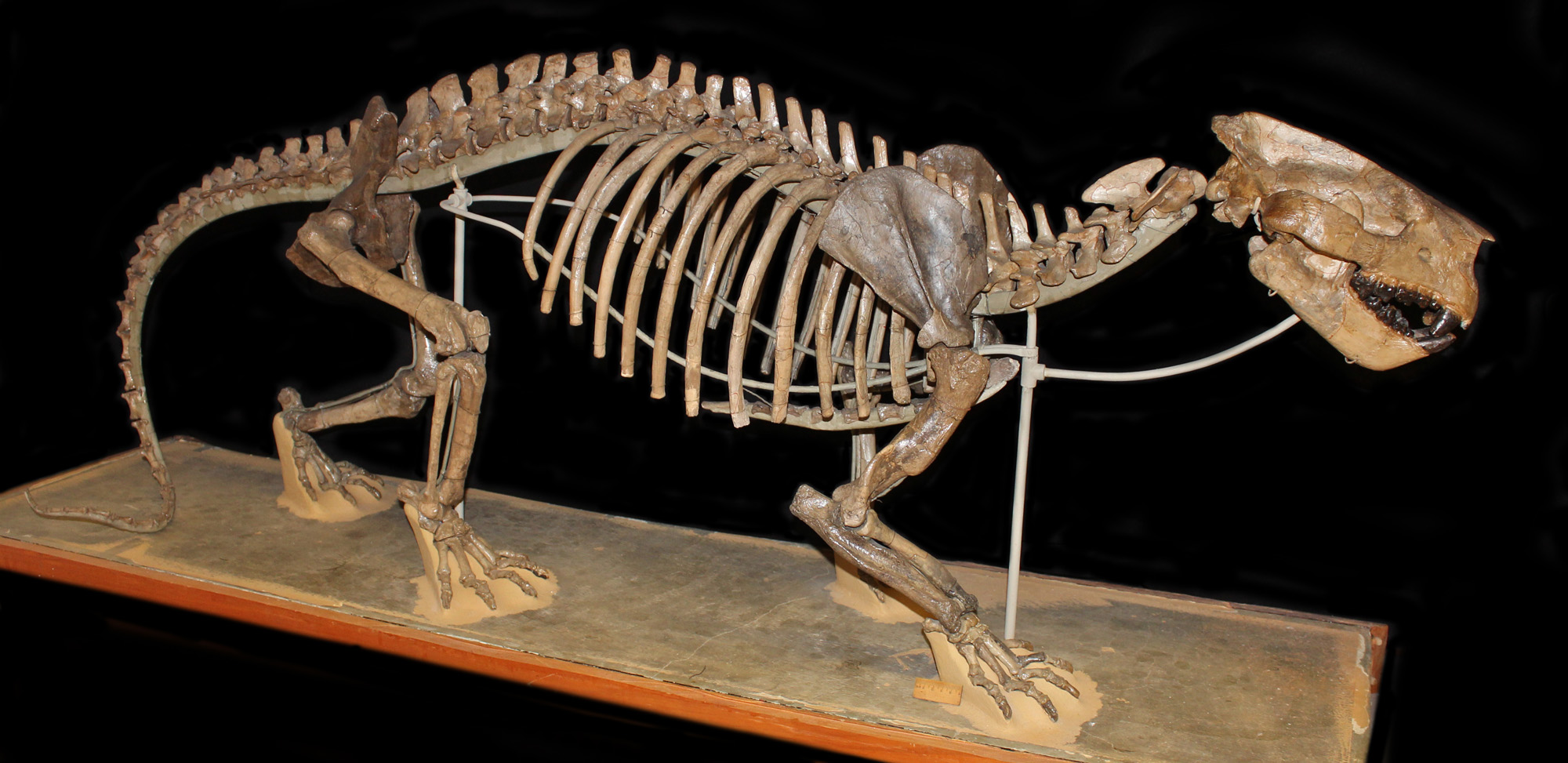
skeleton of Patriofelis ferox

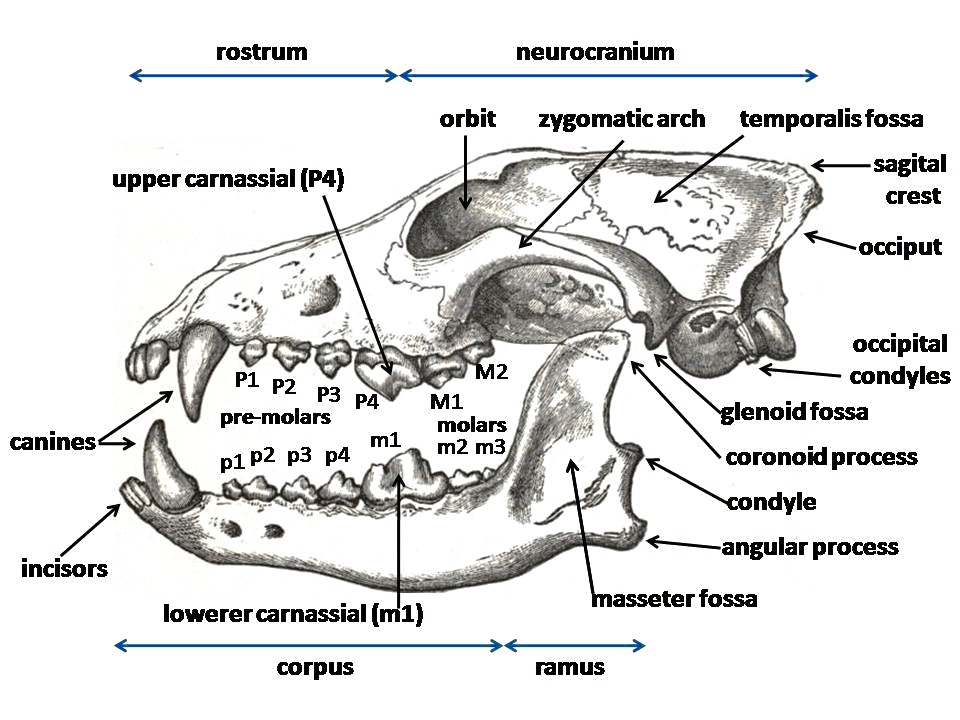
diagram of a wolf skull with key features labelled

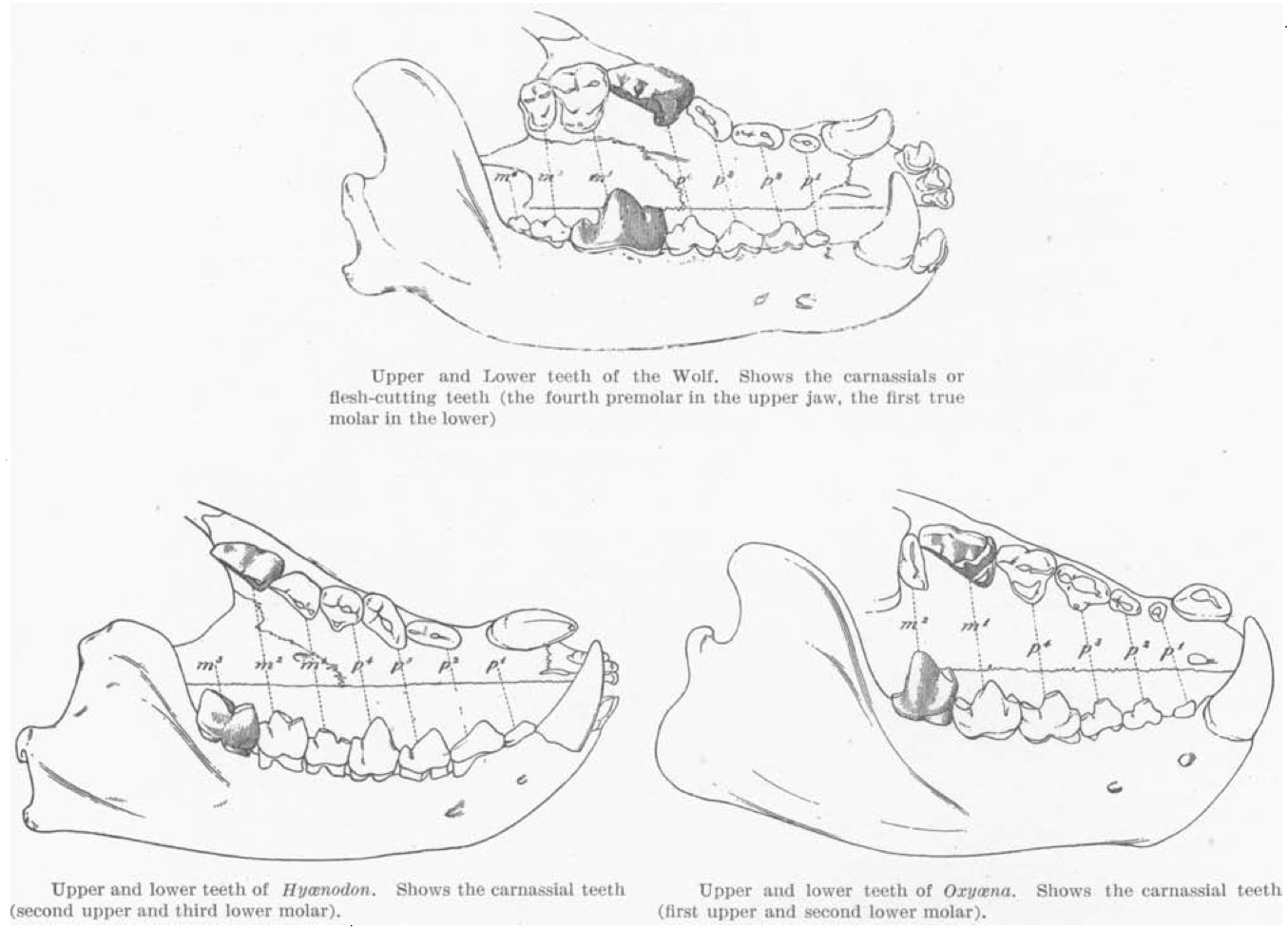
Comparison of carnassial teeth of a carnivoran (wolf), a hyaenodontid (Hyaenodon) and an oxyaenid (Oxyaena)

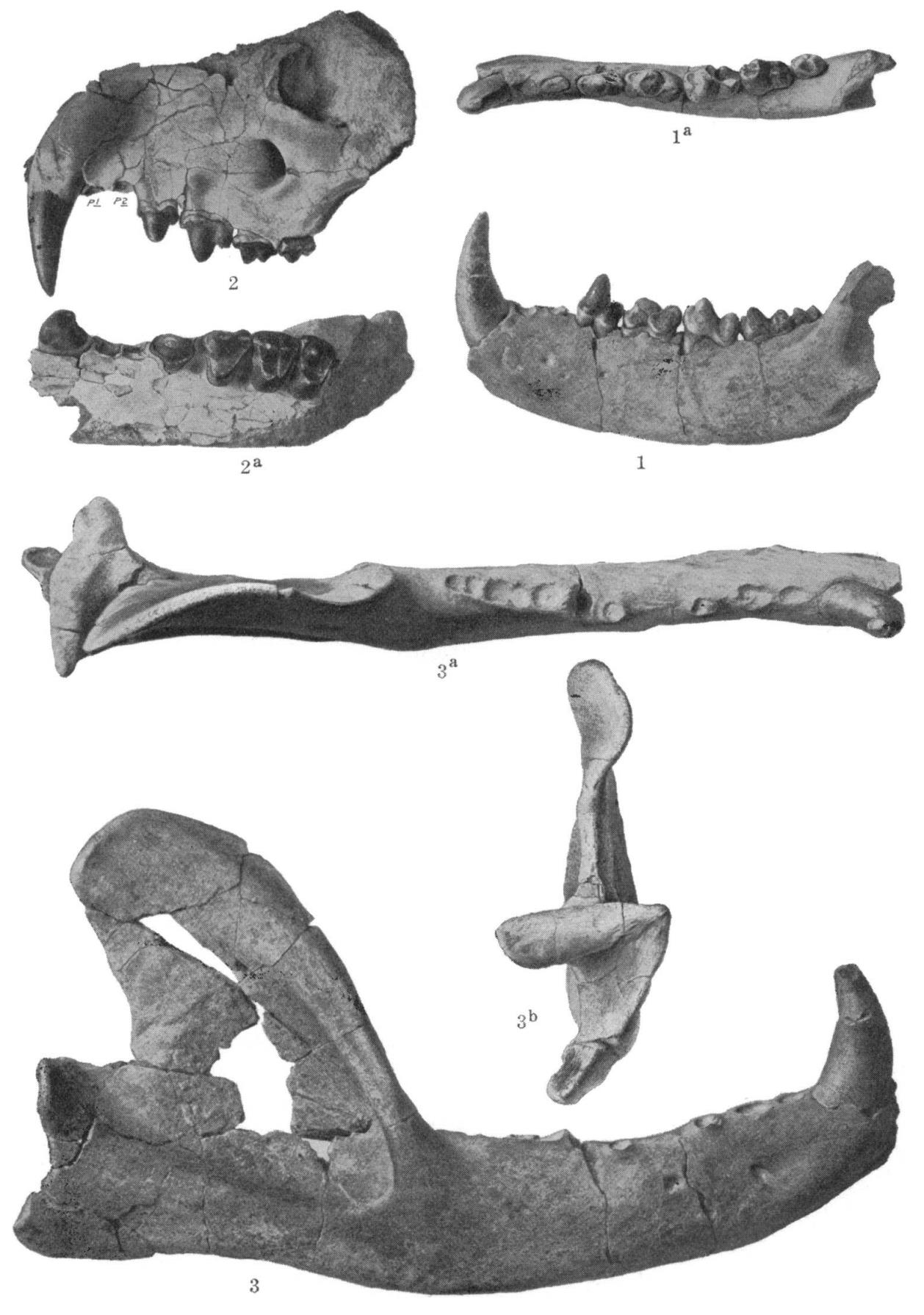
skull and jaws of
Simidectes merriami

== Classification and phylogeny ==
=== Sister groups to Ferae ===
According to recent studies, the closest relatives of Ferae are members of clade Pan-Euungulata (group that includes mirorder Euungulata and extinct genus Protungulatum). Together they form grandorder Ferungulata.

An alternate phylogeny holds that the closest relative to Ferae is order Perissodactyla, with whom they form a clade Zooamata. Together, clade Zooamata and order Chiroptera form clade Pegasoferae, and Pegasoferae is sister taxon to order Artiodactyla within clade Scrotifera. However, subsequent molecular studies have generally failed to support this proposal.

=== Position of pangolins and creodonts within clade ===
Pangolins were long thought to be the closest relatives of aardvark and xenarthrans, forming to the now obsolete order Edentata. Research based on immunodiffusion technique and comparison of protein and DNA sequences revealed the close relationships between pangolins and carnivorans, with whom they also share a few unusual derived morphological and anatomical traits, such as the ossified tentorium cerebelli and the fusion of the scaphoid and lunate bones in the wrist. The last common ancestor of extant Ferae is supposed to have diversified c. 75.31 million years ago.

While there has been strong support in the inclusion of order Creodonta into Ferae, they were usually recovered as sister taxon to order Carnivora. The Halliday et al. (2015) phylogenetic analysis of hundreds of morphological characters of Paleocene placentals found instead that creodonts might be the sister group to Pholidotamorpha (pangolins and their stem-relatives). However, recent studies have shown that Creodonta is an invalid polyphyletic taxon. Members of this group are now part of clade Pan-Carnivora and sister taxa to Carnivoramorpha (carnivorans and their stem-relatives), split in two groups: order Oxyaenodonta on one side and on the other side order Hyaenodonta plus its stem-relatives, genera Simidectes and Altacreodus.

However, over the recent years the monophyly carnivoramorphans has been challenged, with Viverravidae being basal to the clade containing hyaenodonts, oxyaenids, and carnivorans.

=== Taxonomy ===
| Former classification (McKenna & Bell, 1997): | Current classification: |
|---|---|
| Grandorder: Ferae (Linnaeus, 1758); Order: Carnivora (Bowdich, 1821) (carnivorans); Order: Cimolesta (McKenna, 1975); Suborder: Pholidota (Weber, 1904) (pangolins); Suborder: †Apatotheria (Scott & Jepsen, 1936); Suborder: †Didelphodonta (McKenna, 1975); Suborder: †Ernanodonta (Ding, 1987); Suborder: †Pantodonta (Cope, 1873); Suborder: †Pantolesta (McKenna, 1975); Suborder: †Taeniodonta (Cope, 1876); Suborder: †Tillodontia (Marsh, 1875); Family: †Palaeoryctidae (Winge, 1917); "Subfamily:" †Wyolestinae (Gingerich, 1981); Genus: †Alostera (Fox, 1989); Genus: †Avitotherium (Cifelli, 1990); Genus: †Pararyctes (Van Valen, 1966); Genus: †Ravenictis (Fox & Youzwyshyn, 1994); Order: †Creodonta (Cope, 1875) (false carnivorans); Family: †Hyaenodontidae (Leidy, 1869); Family: †Oxyaenidae (Cope, 1877); "Subfamily:" †Koholiinae (Crochet, 1988); Genus: †Prionogale (Schmidt-Kittler & Heizmann, 1991) | Mirorder: Ferae (Linnaeus, 1758); Clade: Pan-Carnivora (Flynn, Wyss & Wolsan, 2020) (carnivorans and carnivoran-like mammals); Clade: Carnivoramorpha (Wyss & Flynn, 1993) (carnivorans and stem-relatives) [= Carnivora (sensu lato)]; Order: †Oxyaenodonta (Van Valen, 1971); Family: †Oxyaenidae (Cope, 1877); (unranked): †Hyaenodonta [sensu lato]; Order: †Hyaenodonta [sensu stricto] (Van Valen, 1967); Genus: †Altacreodus (Fox, 2015); Genus: †Simidectes (Stock, 1933); Clade: Pholidotamorpha (Gaudin, 2009) (pangolins and pangolin-like mammals); Order: Pholidota (Weber, 1904) (pangolins); Order: †Afredentata (Szalay & Schrenk, 1994) (european anteaters); Order: †Palaeanodonta (Matthew, 1918) (stem-pangolins); Genus: †Euromanis (Gaudin, 2009); (?) Order: †Pantolesta (McKenna, 1975) |

==== Alternative classification and possible fossil members ====
Phylogenetic analysis by Halliday et al. (2015) found various enigmatic Palaeocene eutherian mammals have to possible members of Ferae, like members of orders Mesonychia, Pantodonta and Taeniodonta, and families Arctocyonidae, Didelphodontidae, Nyctitheriidae, Palaeoryctidae, Periptychidae and Triisodontidae. Mesonychians are proposed to be a sister group to carnivoramorphs, while arctocyonids were polyphyletic, with genera Arctocyon and Loxolophus as a sister taxa to pantodonts and periptychids, Goniacodon and Eoconodon sister to the Carnivoramorpha-Mesonychia clade, and other genera allied with creodonts and palaeoryctids. This enlarged Ferae was also found to be the sister group to order Chiroptera, even though recent studies dispute this classification. Additionally, Mesonychia and Triisodontidae were found to be more closely related to Euungulate than to Ferae.

== See also ==
- Mammal classification
- Ferungulata
