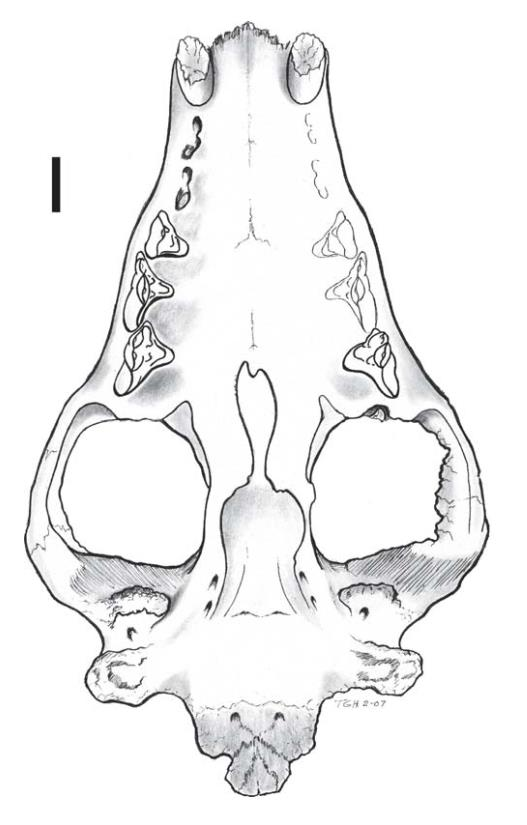
- Restoration of the skull of Malfelis badwaterensis.

Scientific classification
- Kingdom: Animalia
- Phylum: Chordata
- Class: Mammalia
- Order: †Oxyaenodonta
- Family: †Oxyaenidae
- Subfamily: †Oxyaeninae
- Genus: †Malfelis; Stucky and Hardy, 2007

Type species
- Malfelis Badwaterensis Stucky and Hardy, 2007

= Malfelis =

Malfelis Temporal range: Early - Middle Eocene, 50.3–46.2 Ma

Extinct genus of carnivorous mammal

Malfelis is an extinct genus of carnivorous placental mammals from the extinct subfamily Oxyaeninae, within the extinct family Oxyaenidae. It is from western North America of early Bridgerian Land Mammal Age (Eocene). The type species, Malfelis badwaterensis, is the only known species of the genus.

== Discovery and naming ==
The genus and species could first be described after a nearly complete juvenile skull, as well as a part of its dentary, was found in the Wind River Formation of Wyoming, North America. Here, it was found in situ in a horizon below the main fossil-bearing red mudstone layer. Malfelis is believed to be one of the largest animals from its type locality, where nearly 80 mammal species have been found.

The name Malfelis comes from the Latin words malo, which means "bad", and felis, meaning "cat". The species Malfelis badwaterensis is named after the extinct settlement of Badwater, Wyoming.

== Description ==
Malfelis was large, with a total skull length of approximately 30 cm. The size of Malfelis was comparable with that of the other North American genera Patriofelis, Protopsalis, and the larger species of Oxyaena. Malfelis had a short neurocranium, while the snout was relatively long and narrow in comparison with Oxyaena and Patriofelis. Compared to Patriofelis which had a flat palate, Malfelis palate was very arched. The eye sockets were believed to be about 20 mm in diameter, which is fairly small. The sagittal crest was much more developed in Malfelis than in Patriofelis. No bones below the skull have been found of Malfelis.

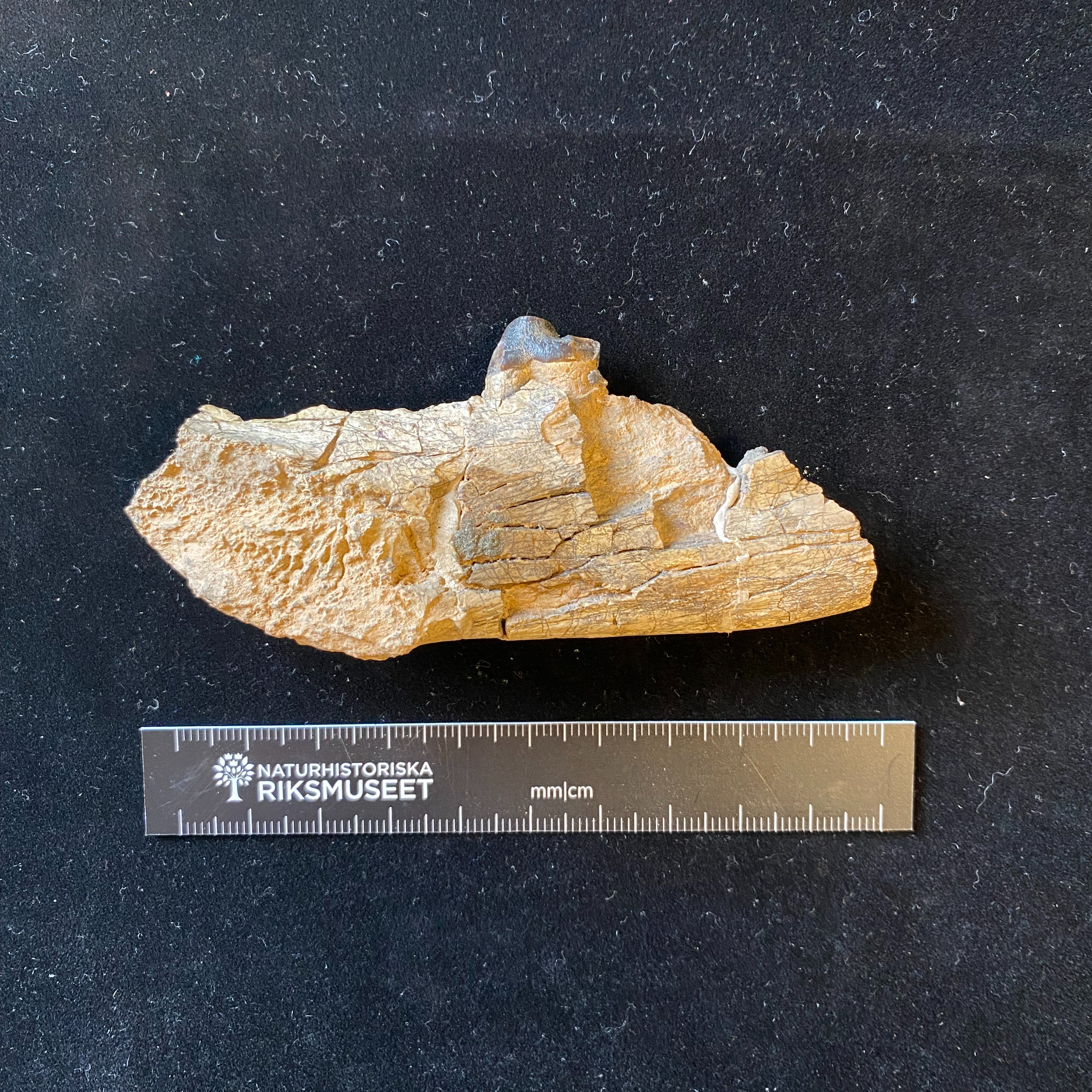
Mandible of the oxyaenid Oxyaena. From the collection of the Swedish Museum of Natural History.

=== Dentition ===
The diagnostic features of Malfelis are the loss of the upper third molar and the presence of a sectorial metastylar blade on both the fourth premolar and first molar. The upper dental formula is 3-1-4-2. The first and second upper premolars are separated by a diastema. The deciduous third and fourth premolars, as well as the first upper molar, have a reduced protocone. The paracone and metacone on the deciduous fourth premolar and the first upper molar are joined near their tips, forming a crest (centrocrista) that is separated by a small indent from the metastylar blade. The second upper molar is present, although small and possibly vestigial. The molar row does not extend onto the zygomatic arch.

The first upper molar has a long and slightly arched metacone blade, a small parastyle, and no preglenoid crest or ridge. It forms a shearing edge from the metacone to the back of the tooth, and its protocone is much smaller than in Oxyaena but larger than in Patriofelis. The second and third upper premolars are relatively small and spaced. The fourth upper premolar has a large protocone, a long metastylar blade, and a sharp paracone.

== Paleobiology ==
Malfelis badwaterensis was a hypercarnivore (diet consisting of >70% meat), and an obligate, pursuit predator. While other oxyaenids like Patriofelis were suggestively bone-crushers, Malfelis was not due to its long snout and relatively small premolars, at least not at this point in its development. Malfelis, together with Patriofelis, and Protopsalis, were top predators. They hunted animals smaller than themselves, such as titanotheres, uintatheres, early tapirs and rhinoceroses, and other mammals of small-to medium size.

== Paleoecology ==
The holotype, and to this day only known specimen found of Malfelis badwaterensis, was recovered from the Lost Cabin Member of the Wind River Formation in Wyoming, North America. The deposits of this formation date to the early Eocene. This was a warm period in Earth's history, where a wet and warm climate dominated in most of North America. In the second half of the Eocene, the climate of North America became cooler and drier. This changed the environment in which some of the oxyaenids lived in, going from living in swampy and paratropical forests, to temperate forests and open landscapes.

=== Extinction ===
All oxyaenids, including Malfelis, became extinct during the Eocene. In a 2019 thesis, Anne K. Kort suggested that the group's inability to adapt to the loss of tropical environments and the transition to more open landscapes, based on her study of the morphology of Patriofelis ulta, may have contributed to their extinction. Its robust build could have restricted its mobility, making it difficult to chase prey over longer distances. Although this could have been a disadvantage to an ambush predator like Patriofelis, it is unknown whether Malfelis faced the same limitation, as it was a pursuit predator and its postcranial anatomy is currently unknown. Hypercarnivory could also have made oxyaenids like Malfelis more prone to extinction, due to high energy requirements.

== Classification ==
Oxyaenids are one of the extinct groups that traditionally was placed in the order Creodonta. Today, Creodonta is believed to be a polyphyletic group, grouping together the families Hyaenodontidae and Oxyaenidae. Because of this, Oxyaenidae is preferably placed in the ordinal group Oxyaenodonta.

=== Taxonomy ===
- Order: †Oxyaenodonta Van Valen, 1971
  - Family: †Oxyaenidae Cope, 1877
    - Subfamily: †Machaeroidinae Matthew, 1909
    - Subfamily: †Oxyaeninae Cope, 1877
      - Genus: †Argillotherium Davies, 1884
      - Genus: †Dipsalidictis ^{(paraphyletic genus)} Matthew & Granger, 1915
      - Genus: †Malfelis Stucky & Hardy, 2007
        - †Malfelis badwaterensis Stucky & Hardy, 2007
      - Genus: †Oxyaena Cope, 1874
      - Genus: †Patriofelis Leidy, 1870
      - Genus: †Protopsalis Cope, 1880
      - Genus: †Sarkastodon Granger, 1938
    - Subfamily: †Palaeonictinae Denison, 1938
    - Subfamily: †Tytthaeninae Gunnell & Gingerich, 1991

Note that the full diversity of Oxyaenidae is not represented by this diagram. Only genera of Oxyaeninae are shown, and Malfelis badwaterensis is the only species displayed.
