= 1938 in paleontology =

Paleontology or palaeontology is the study of prehistoric life forms on Earth through the examination of plant and animal fossils. This includes the study of body fossils, tracks (ichnites), burrows, cast-off parts, fossilised feces (coprolites), palynomorphs and chemical residues. Because humans have encountered fossils for millennia, paleontology has a long history both before and after becoming formalized as a science. This article records significant discoveries and events related to paleontology that occurred or were published in the year 1938.

== Dinosaurs ==
=== New taxa ===
Name	Novelty	Status	Authors	Age	Type locality	Location	Notes	Images
"Antarctosaurus jaxarticus"		Nomen nudum	Riabinin	Santonian	Dabrazinskaya Svita	Kazakhstan	An informal species of Antarctosaurus	
"Bactrosaurus prynadai"		Nomen nudum	Riabinin	Santonian	Dabrazinskaya Svita	Kazakhstan	A species of Bactrosaurus, formally described in 1939	
"Jaxartosaurus aralensis"		Nomen nudum	Riabinin	Santonian	Dabrazinskaya Svita	Kazakhstan	A hadrosaurid, formally described in 1939	

== Synapsids ==
=== Non-mammalian ===
Name	Novelty	Status	Authors	Age	Type strata	Location	Notes	Images
Dinanomodon		Valid	Broom			South Africa		Dinanomodon
Haughtoniana		Valid	Boonstra					
Ictidosuchops		Valid	Broom			South Africa		
Pelanomodon		Valid	Broom			South Africa		Pelanomodon
Rubidgea		Valid	Broom			South Africa		Rubidgea
Titanophoneus		Valid	Efremov			Russia		Titanophoneus
Ulemosaurus		Valid	Riabinin			Russia		Ulemosaurus

=== Mammals ===
Name	Novelty	Status	Authors	Age	Type Strata	Location	Notes	Images
Cooperia	Gen. et. sp. nov.	Jr Homonym	Wood	Eocene	Irdin Manha Formation	China	The type species is C. totadentata. A replacement name Forstercooperia given in 1939. Genus a jr homonym of the nematode Cooperia Ransom	Forstercooperia totadentata
Pachycrocuta		Valid	Kretzoi					Pachycrocuta
Leo gombaszögensis	Sp nov	Valid	Kretzoi	Pleistocene		Italy	Currently known as Panthera gombaszogensis.	Panthera gombaszogensis
Sarkastodon	Gen et sp nov	Valid	Granger	Eocene	Irdin Manha Formation	China	The type species is S. mongoliensis	Sarkastodon mongoliensis
Xenocyon		Valid	Kretzoi					Xenocyon
