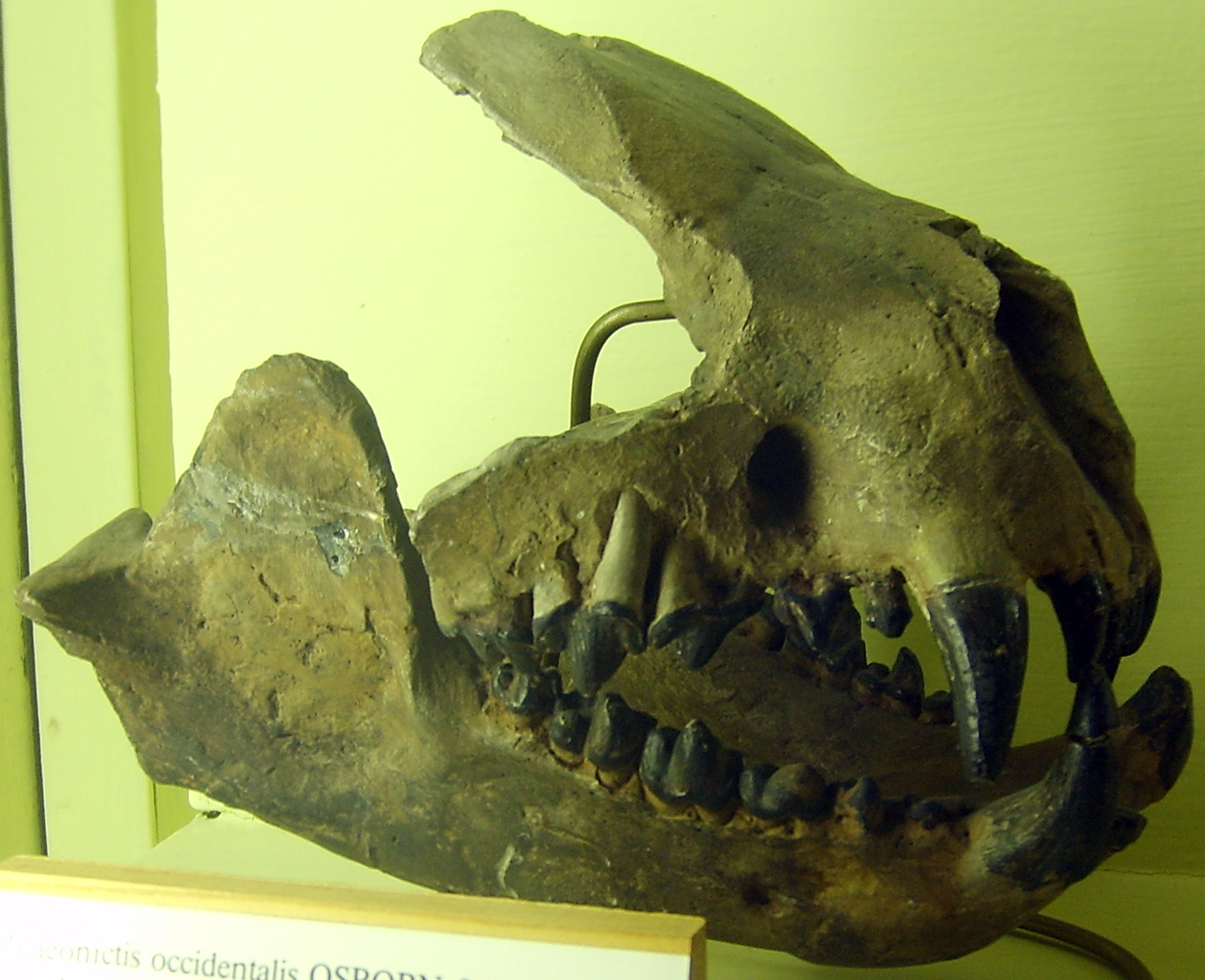
- Skull of P. occidentalis

Scientific classification
- Kingdom: Animalia
- Phylum: Chordata
- Class: Mammalia
- Infraclass: Placentalia
- Clade: Pan-Carnivora
- Order: †Oxyaenodonta
- Family: †Oxyaenidae
- Subfamily: †Palaeonictinae
- Genus: †Palaeonictis de Blainville, 1842

Type species
- †Palaeonictis gigantea de Blainville, 1842

Other species
- †P. occidentalis (Osborn, 1892); †P. peloria (Rose, 1981); †P. wingi (Chester, 2010)

Synonyms
- synonyms of genus: Dormaalodon (Lange-Badré, 1987); Palaeonyctis (Cope, 1880); synonyms of species: P. gigantea: Dormaalodon woutersi (Lange-Badré, 1987); Oxyaena casieri (Quinet, 1966); Palaeonyctis gigantea (Cope, 1880)

= Palaeonictis =

Palaeonictis Temporal range: Late Paleocene - Early Eocene 56.2–53.4 Ma

Extinct family of mammals

Palaeonictis ("ancient weasel") is an extinct genus of placental mammals from extinct subfamily Palaeonictinae within extinct family Oxyaenidae, that lived in Europe and North America from the Late Paleocene to the Early Eocene. Palaeonictines were a group of oxyaenids that consisted of omnivorous oxyaenids and were closely related to the hypercarnivorous macheroidines. Palaeonictis was a small to medium sized oxyaenid, with the largest species, P. peloria, weighing 11.7 kg (26 lb).

== Taxonomy ==
Palaeonictis is classified as a Oxyaenidae, which was originally considered to be one of the two groups of Creodonta, with the other being Hyaenodontidae. However, recent analysis have questioned the monophyletic nature of creodonts, finding it to be polyphyletic group of two unrelated clades. Since then, Hyaenodontidae and Oxyaenidae, were ranked up to orders, Hyaenodonta and Oxyaenodonta respectively.

Gunnell (1991) recovered palaeonictines were closely related to Tytthaena. On the other hand, recent phylogenetic modeling performed by Zack et al. recovered palaeonictines as a sister clade to machaeroidines, a subfamily of sabertoothed oxyaenids.

Cladogram of oxyaenids recovered by Gunnell (1991):

- Oxyaenidae
  - - - Tytthaena parrisi
      - Tytthaena lichna
    - - - Palaeonictis occidentalis
        - Palaeonictis peloria
      - - Dipsalodon matthewi
        - Dipsalodon churchillorum
  - - - Dipsalidictis krausei
      - - Dipsalidictis transiens
        - - Dipsalidictis platypus
          - Dipsalidictis aequidens
    - - Oxyaena gulo
      - - Oxyaena intermedia
        - Oxyaena forcipata

=== Evolution ===
Oxyaenids were believed to have evolved in the Middle Paleocene, roughly 60 Ma. However, they wouldn't appear in the fossil record until the Late Paleocene, with Tytthaena. Palaeonictines first appeared Ti5 of the Tiffanian faunal stage, with Palaeonictis first appearing during the latest Paleocene, with the oldest species P. peloria. This species was thought to have been ancestral to the other species of Palaeonictis, first giving rise to P. wingi and P. gigantea. The former would evolve into P. occidentalis following the PETM.

== Description ==
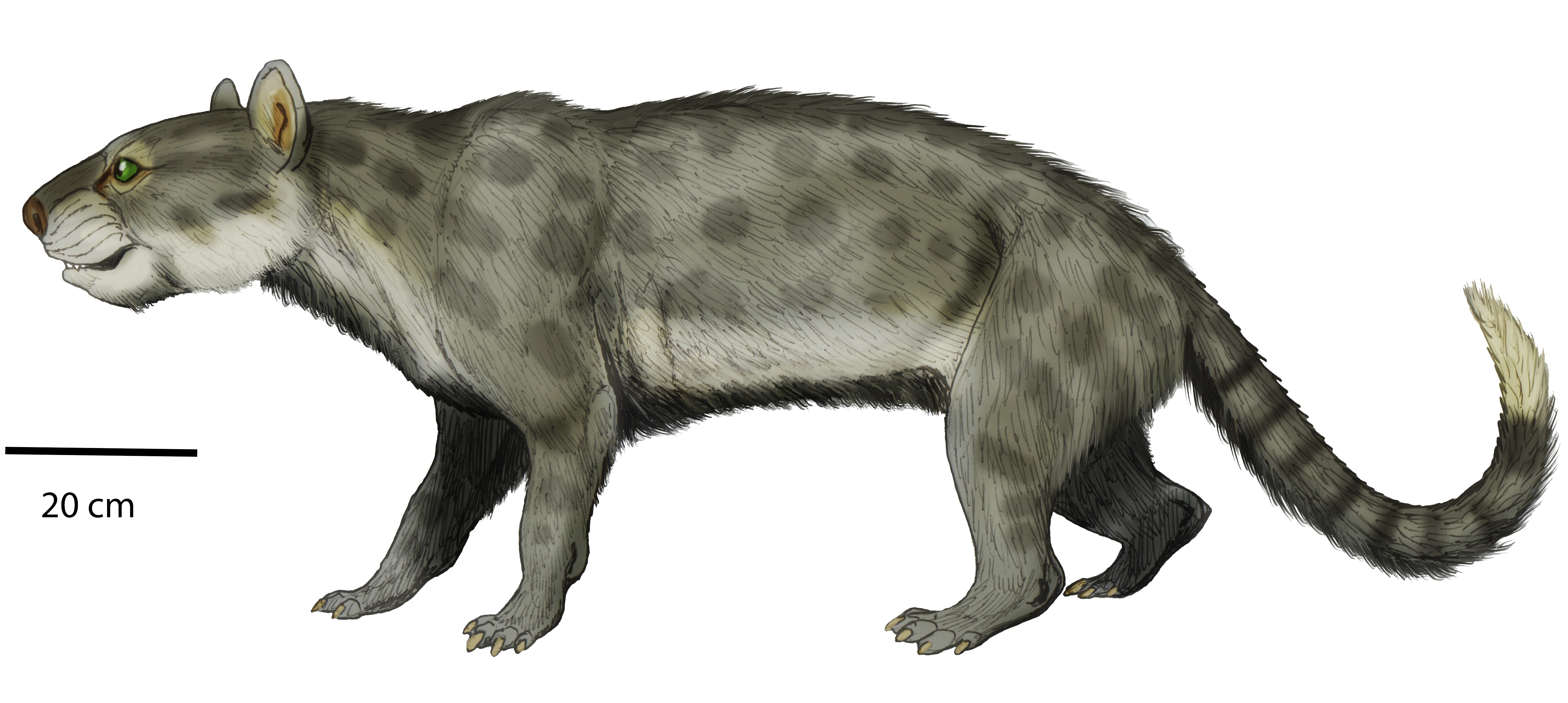
Life restoration of P. occidentalis

The biggest species, P. peloria, is known from an incomplete jaw that must have measured over 20 centimetres (7.9 in) in length. Juhn et al. (2024) estimated that P. peloria weighed 11.7 kg (26 lb). P. occidentalis was another large species within the genus weighing up to 6.33 kg (14.0 lb). During the Paleocene-Eocene Thermal Maximum, the genus saw a decrease in size leading to the appearance of P. wingi and P. gigantea, the smallest species within the genus.

== Extinction ==
European oxyaenids, including P. gigantea, went extinct roughly 53 Ma during the Intra-Ypresian Mammal Turnover. P. occidentalis was the last species to go extinct, going extinct between the 4th and 6th biochron of the Wasatchian faunal stage.

The extinction of Palaeonictis, as well as oxyaenids as a whole, has been debated by experts. Gunnell (1998) and Chester et al. (2010) suggested the extinction of paleonictines, as well as other oxyaenids, was due to competition with carnivorans. However, the excellent North American fossil record indicates oxyaenids were declining well before the appearance of the replacement taxa such as carnivorans. Furthermore, Fischer et al. (2026) found a there was a notable temporal gap between similar sized European oxyaenids and carnivoramorphans suggesting competitive replacement likely wasn't responsible for the extinction of oxyaenids in Europe.
