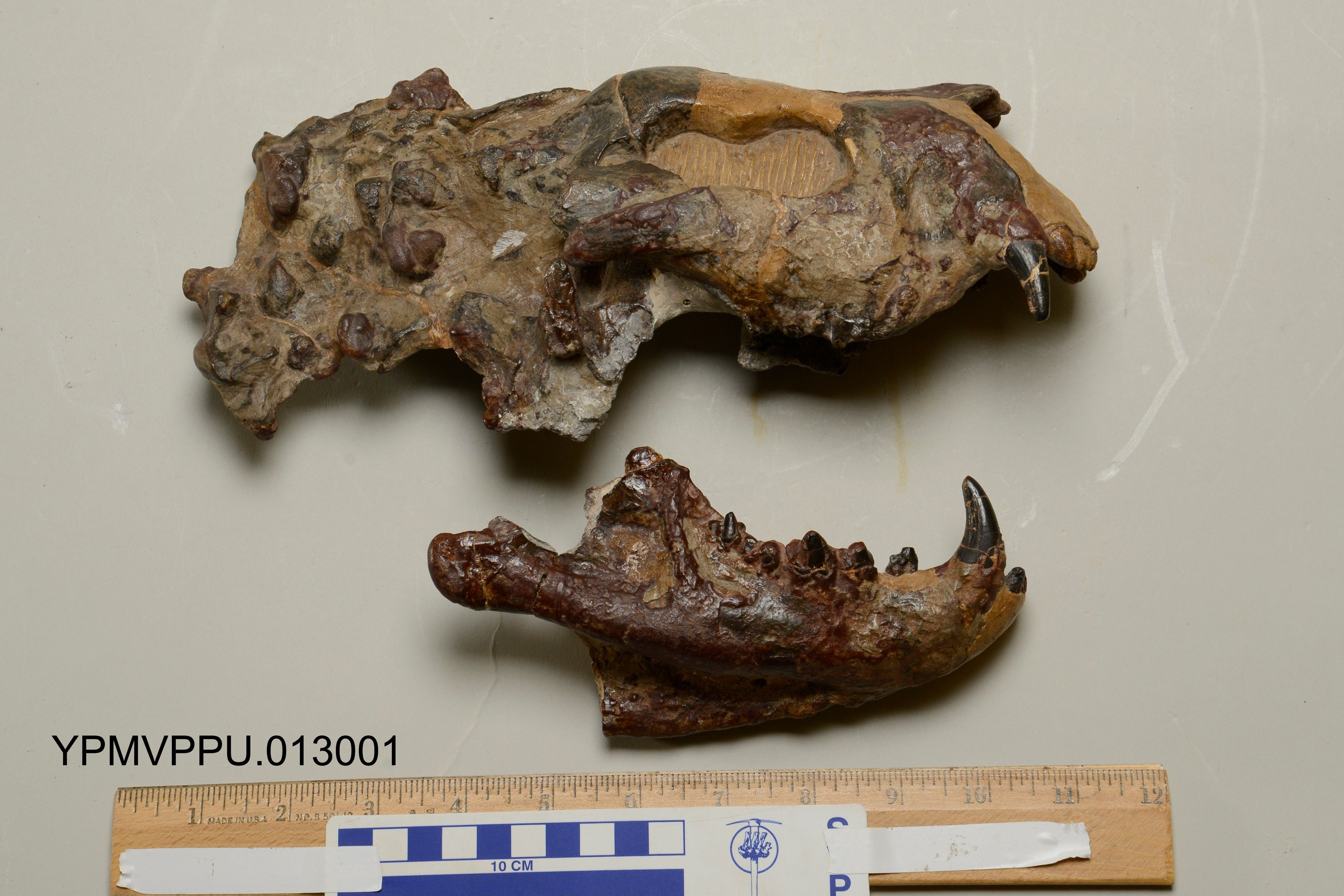
- skull of Palaeonictis occidentalis
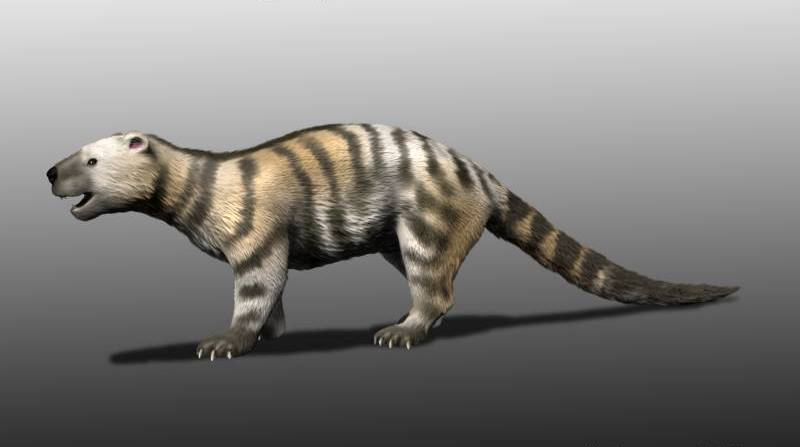
- reconstruction of Patriofelis ferox

Scientific classification
- Kingdom: Animalia
- Phylum: Chordata
- Class: Mammalia
- Mirorder: Ferae
- Clade: Pan-Carnivora
- Order: †Oxyaenodonta; Van Valen, 1971
- Family: †Oxyaenidae; Cope, 1877

Type genus
- †Oxyaena Cope, 1874

Subfamilies
- †Machaeroidinae; †Oxyaeninae; †Palaeonictinae; †Tytthaeninae

Synonyms
- synonyms of order: Oxyaenida (Van Valkenburgh, 2007); synonyms of family: Oxyaenoidea (Osborn, 1910)

= Oxyaenidae =

Oxyaenidae Temporal range: Late Paleocene to Middle Eocene 58.9–41.5 Ma Suspected Middle Paleocene origin

Extinct family of mammals

Oxyaenidae ("sharp hyenas") is a family of extinct carnivorous placental mammals. Traditionally classified in order Creodonta, this group is now classified in its own order Oxyaenodonta ("sharp tooth hyenas") within clade Pan-Carnivora in mirorder Ferae. Phylogenetic analysis recovered them as a sister group to Carnivoraformes, a clade that consisted of Carnivora and close relatives. The group contains four subfamilies comprising fourteen genera. Oxyaenids first appeared during the late Paleocene in North America, with smaller radiations of oxyaenids in Eurasia occurring during the Eocene. They would go extinct in the Middle Eocene being replaced by nimravids, which took over the cat-like niche once occupied by oxyaenids.

== Etymology ==
The name of order Oxyaenodonta comes from Ancient Greek ὀξύς (oxús) 'sharp', name of hyena genus Hyaena and from Ancient Greek ὀδούς (odoús) 'tooth'.

The name of family Oxyaenidae comes from Ancient Greek ὀξύς (oxús) 'sharp', name of hyena genus Hyaena and taxonomic suffix "-idae".

== Characteristics ==
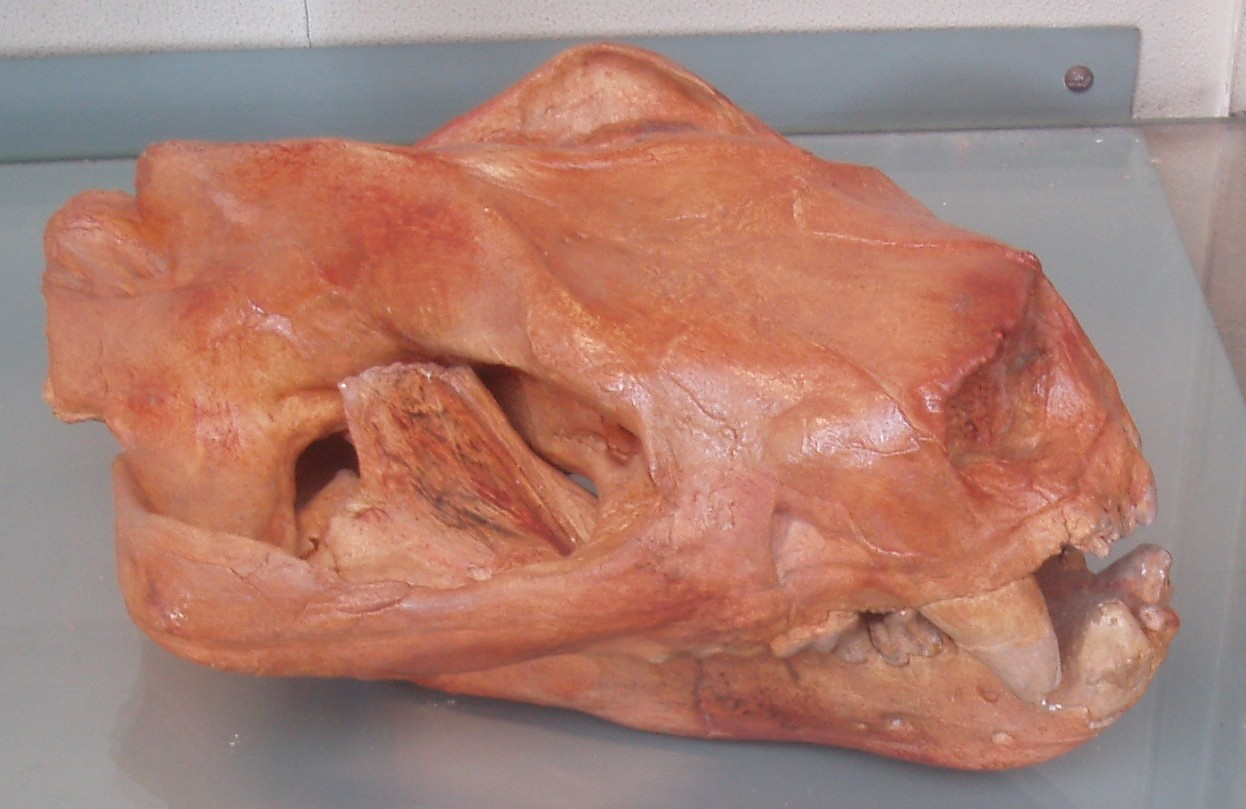
Skull of Patriofelis ulta at Muséum national d'Histoire naturelle, Paris

They were superficially otter- or badger-like placental mammals that walked on flat feet, in contrast to most modern Carnivora, which walk and run on their toes. Though most genera were medium-sized by modern standards, they may have been the earliest group of large carnivorous mammals. The largest known oxyaenid was Sarkastodon mongoliensis, which could have weighed 800 kg (1,800 lb). However, this may have been an overestimate. All had two molars on each side of both the upper and lower jaw. While many oxyaenids, such as Patriofelis, were hypercarnivores, some such as Oxyaena were more omnivorous, with meat-based but varied diets similar to modern brown bears and racoons. Of the four families:

- The Tytthaeninae were the earliest representatives of the group, generally smaller and with more unspecialized bodies and primitive features.
- The Paleonictinae included intermediate-sized hypercarnivores and mixed feeders.
- The Oxyaeninae included the largest genera, such as Sarkaskadon, Patriofelis, and Oxyaena. Some genera showed Hunter-Schrager bands on their molars, typical of bone-cracking. They were adapted for terrestrial locomotion and probably hunted or scavanged on forest floors.
- The Macheroidinae were a small group of specialized hypercarnivores adapted for arboreal locomotion, with long slender bodies and strong grappling forelimbs This group was the first saber-toothed mammals in the fossil record. A flange on the lower jaw partially protected their long, slender saber canine teeth. They ranged from civet- to leopard-sized, probably lived in the trees of closed-canopy forests, and ambushed prey larger than their bodies. Since most large herbivores at the time were terrestrial, it is likely they dropped from trees onto their prey.

Overall, oxyaenids had long, flat heads, long bodies with short legs, large claws, and reinforced, inflexible lower spines. The forelimbs were strong and flexible, and could twist to embrace and grapple, like the forelimbs of cats and unlike those of dogs. These adaptations suggest that hunting oxyaenids were solitary ambush predators that would capture larger prey.

== Evolution ==
Oxyaenodonts were believed to have evolved in the middle Paleocene in North America with the oldest known oxyaenodont, Tytthaena, being found there. Oxyaenodonts would disperse into Northwestern Europe near the Paleocene-Eocene boundary via the De Geer route, however the timing of arrival in Asia is unknown. In North America, oxyaenids increase in diversity, peaking at around 7 species during the Wasatchian stage. ^{Including supplementary materials} The dispersal of oxyaenids into Northwestern Europe is suggested to have been one dispersal event and saw a low number of species.

=== Extinction ===
European oxyaenids would go extinct during the Intra-Ypresian Mammal Turnover. The last paleonictines would go extinct at the end of the 5th biochronology of the Wasatchian stage. Oxyaenines would go went extinct in North America at the end of the Bridgerian, with only macheroidines persisting into Uintan. Macheroidines would go extinct around 41.5 Ma, which may be linked to the significant faunal overturn during the transition period between the middle and late Eocene.

The cause of oxyaenids extinction has been debated by experts. Chester et al. (2010) suggested the extinction of paleonictines, as well as other oxyaenids, went extinct because of competition with canivorans. Zack et al. (2022) argued the extinction of North American macheroidines was possibly due to competition with nimravids. However, other experts find it unlikely competition with carnivorans to be the cause of their extinction.

The excellent North American fossil record indicates oxyaenids were declining well before the appearance of the replacement taxa such as nimravids. In addition, the youngest records of machaeroidines predate the oldest records of nimravids in North America. Fischer et al. (2026) found a there was a notable temporal gap between similar sized European oxyaenids and carnivoramorphans suggesting competitive replacement likely wasn't responsible for the extinction of oxyaenids in Europe.

Kort (2019) hypothesized that oxyaenids likely went extinct due to the inability to adapt to the open forested habitats that replaced closed forests due to their inflexible spines, which reduced maneuverability and running speed in more open environments.

== Classification and phylogeny ==
=== Taxonomy ===
The family Oxyaenidae is divided into four subfamilies, containing a total of fifteen genera between them.

- Family: Oxyaenidae Cope, 1877
  - Subfamily: Machaeroidinae Matthew, 1909
    - Genus: Apataelurus Scott, 1938
    - Genus: Diegoaelurus Zack, Poust & Wagner, 2022
    - Genus: Isphanatherium Lavrov & Averianov, 1998
    - Genus: Machaeroides Matthew, 1909
  - Subfamily: Oxyaeninae Cope, 1877
    - Genus: Argillotherium Davies, 1884
    - Genus: Dipsalidictis Matthew & Granger, 1915
    - Genus: Malfelis Stucky & Hardy, 2007
    - Genus: Oxyaena Cope, 1874
    - Genus: Patriofelis Leidy, 1870
    - Genus: Protopsalis Cope, 1880
    - Genus: Sarkastodon Granger, 1938
  - Subfamily: Palaeonictinae Denison, 1938
    - Genus: Ambloctonus Cope, 1875
    - Genus: Dipsalodon Jepsen, 193)
    - Genus: Palaeonictis de Blainville, 1842
  - Subfamily: Tytthaeninae Gunnell & Gingerich, 1991
    - Genus: Tytthaena Gingerich, 1980

=== Phylogeny ===
Cladogram according to Gunnel in 1991:

- Oxyaenidae
  - - - Tytthaena parrisi
      - Tytthaena lichna
    - - - Palaeonictis occidentalis
        - Palaeonictis peloria
      - - Dipsalodon matthewi
        - Dipsalodon churchillorum
  - - - Dipsalidictis krausei
      - - Dipsalidictis transiens
        - - Dipsalidictis platypus
          - Dipsalidictis aequidens
    - - Oxyaena gulo
      - - Oxyaena intermedia
        - Oxyaena forcipata

== See also ==
- Mammal classification
- Ferae
- Creodonta
