= Eucelophorus =

Eucelophorus Temporal range: Pliocene

Scientific classification
- Kingdom: Animalia
- Phylum: Chordata
- Class: Mammalia
- Order: Rodentia
- Family: Ctenomyidae
- Genus: †Eucelophorus; Ameghino, 1908

Type species
- Eucelophorus chapalmalensis Ameghino, 1908

Other species
- Eucelophorus zaratei Reig and Quintana, 1992

Extinct genus of ctenomyid rodent

Eucelophorus is an extinct genus of ctenomyid rodent that lived in South America during the Pliocene epoch.

== Description ==
Eucelophorus chapalmalensis had a high inclination of its Hunter–Schreger bands (HSBs) relative to other ctenomyids. Its prismless enamel zone and its external index were also very high compared to other ctenomyids.
