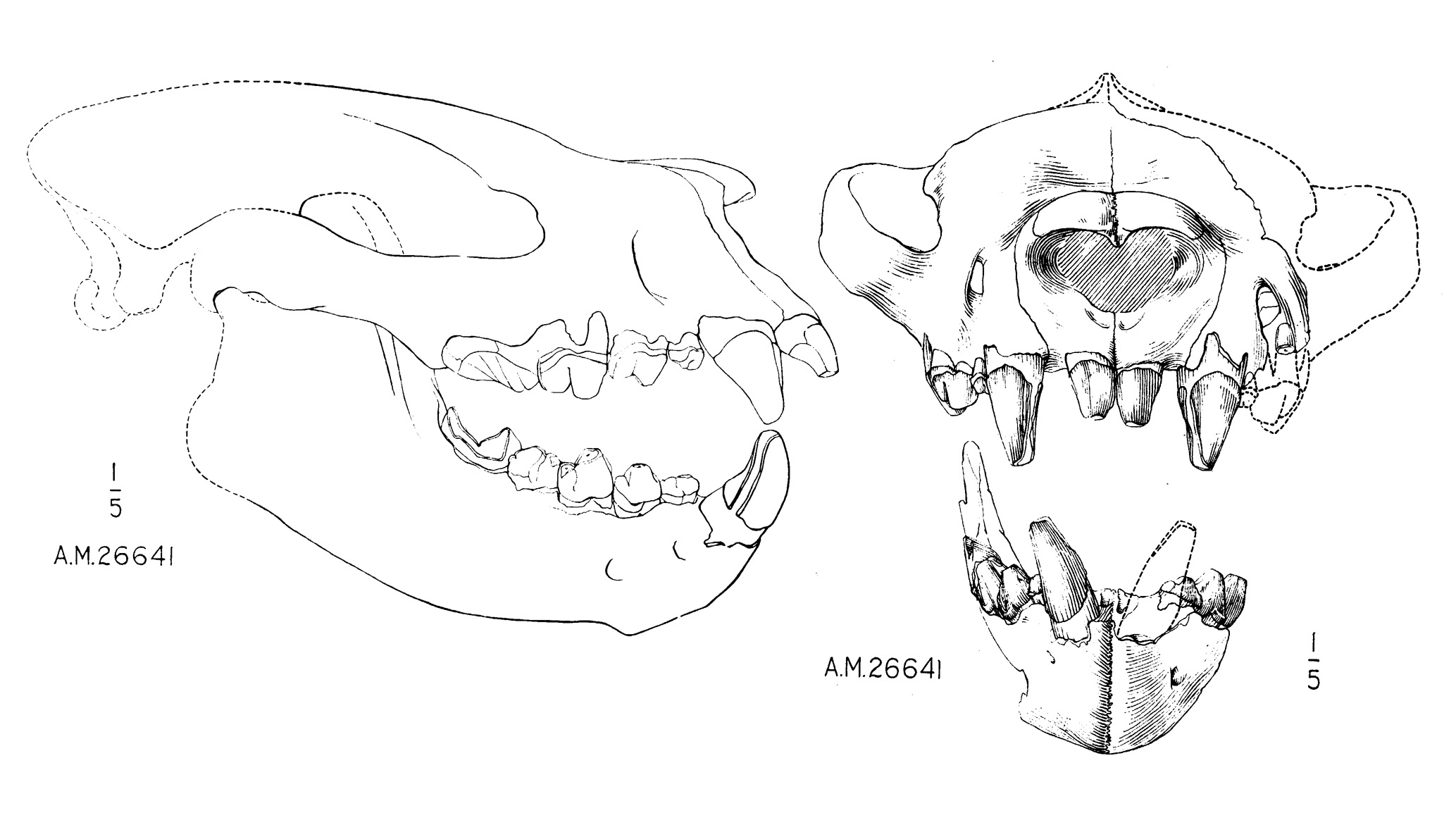
- Skull reconstructions of Sarkastodon mongoliensis

Scientific classification
- Kingdom: Animalia
- Phylum: Chordata
- Class: Mammalia
- Order: †Oxyaenodonta
- Family: †Oxyaenidae
- Subfamily: †Oxyaeninae
- Genus: †Sarkastodon; Granger, 1938

Type species
- †Sarkastodon mongoliensis Granger, 1938

Species
- †Sarkastodon henanensis (Tong & Lei, 1986); †Sarkastodon mongoliensis (Granger, 1938)

= Sarkastodon =

Sarkastodon Temporal range: Middle Eocene (Irdinmanhan) 45–42 Ma

Oxyaenid genus from upper Eocene Epoch

Sarkastodon ("flesh-tearing tooth") is an extinct genus of oxyaenodont. The genus lived in Asia (in today's China and Mongolia) during the middle Eocene and was the last known oxyaenine. The first fossil of Sarkastodon, part of a lower jaw, was discovered in 1928 in one of the Central Asiatic Expeditions. The second, consisting of the front of the skull and two partial lower jaws, was discovered by a surgeon, Dr. A. Z. Garber, in the final expedition, two years later. Recognised as a "relatively colossal" oxyaenid, it was named in 1938 by Walter W. Garber. Two species have been described: S. mongoliensis from the Irdin Manha Formation of Mongolia, and S. henanensis, named in 1986 based on remains from the Hetaoyuan Formation of China.

Sarkastodon has an estimated length of 3 m (9.8 ft). In a 2008 paper, S. mongoliensis was estimated to have had a body mass of about 800 kg (1,800 lb), although given the methodology used, the accuracy of this estimate was called into question by its own proponent. On the other hand, a 2023 paper suggested S. mongoliensis 254.2 kg (560 lb). Though incomplete, the holotype skull of S. mongoliensis was 35 cm (14 in) in total length, with a width across the zygomatic arches of 38 cm (15 in). The skull overall would have been about half as big again as that of Patriofelis, which had been considered the largest oxyaenid until Sarkastodon's naming. The two genera had fairly similar skulls, and were differentiated mainly based on attributes of their teeth. The enamel bands in the teeth of Sarkastodon, known as Hunter-Schreger bands, formed a zig-zag shape, which may be an adaptation for bone-processing.

== Taxonomy ==
=== Early history ===
In 1928, the American Museum of Natural History's Central Asiatic Expedition to Mongolia (one of a series which took place between 1921 and 1930) returned to the strata of the Irdin Manha Formation, from which large mammalian predators such as Andrewsarchus had been previously recovered. At the Chimney Butte site, part of the Ulan Shireh beds, an unknown participant in the expeditions discovered a partial right lower jaw. This jaw was later catalogued as AMNH 26302. Two years later, in the final Central Asiatic Expedition, while prospecting around 25 mi (40 km) southwest of Iren Dabasu, Inner Mongolia, Dr. A. Z. Garber (a surgeon with the Peking Union Medical College), discovered the partial skull and lower jaws of a large predatory animal. It was recognised as belonging to a new taxon, specifically a "relatively colossal" oxyaenid (then part of the order "Creodonta"). In 1938, this second specimen, AMNH 26641, was described by Walter W. Granger, who made it the holotype of a new genus and species, Sarkastodon mongoliensis. The jaw discovered in 1928 was designated as the paratype. The generic name comes from the Ancient Greek σαρκάζω ("to tear flesh"), and οδούς ("tooth").

=== Additional species ===
At some point between 1960 and 1973, the mostly complete left mandible (IVPP.V7998) of a large predatory mammal was recovered from the strata of the Hetaoyuan Formation, and was subsequently brought to the Institute for Vertebrate Paleontology and Paleoanthropology. In 1986, Y. Tong and Y. Lei published a revision of the mammal material from the site. They noted similarities between IVPP.V7998 and the North American Patriofelis, though, based on other morphological traits, assigned it to Sarkastodon. A new species, S. henanensis, was named based on this specimen.

=== Classification ===
Sarkastodon is a member of the family Oxyaenidae, which is in turn part of the order Oxyaenodonta. Oxyaenids were at one point considered members of a larger order, Creodonta, alongside hyaenodonts. More recent papers have not supported the monophyly of creodonts, and the link between the two is predicated largely on the presence of a blade on the metastyle of the first molar, a trait present in many eutherians. In a 1938 revision of the family, R. H. Denison placed Sarkastodon within the subfamily Oxyaeninae, alongside other large taxa such as Patriofelis.

== Description ==
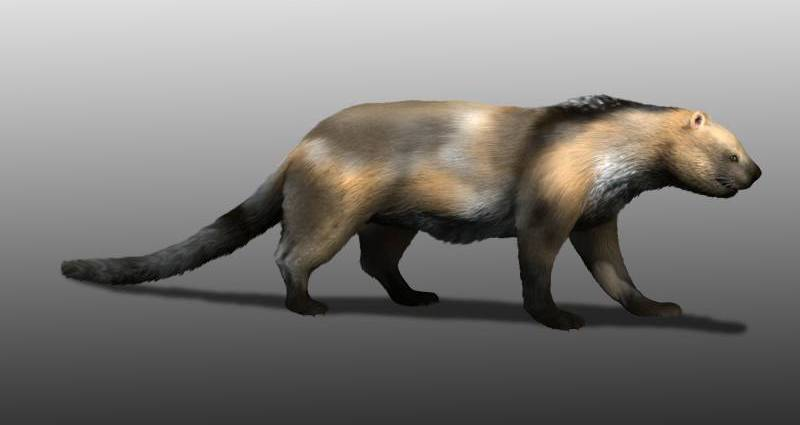
Reconstruction of S. mongoliensis

Sarkastodon was the largest of the oxyaenids, measuring approximately 3 m (9.8 ft) in length. In 2009, Boris Sorkin provided an estimate for the body mass of S. mongoliensis based on the size of the lower jaw and extrapolations from modern felids. The maximum mass estimate he recovered was 800 kg (1,800 lb), roughly twice that of the American lion in the same analysis. He did, however, note the caveat that S. mongoliensis shows significant morphological differences from its extant model (the African lion), so this estimate may not be as reliable as some of the others in the same analysis. Sanisidro et al. (2023) estimated S. henanensis weighed 23.2 kg (51 lb), while S. mongoliensis weighed 254.2 kg (560 lb).

=== Skull and dentition ===
The skull of Sarkastodon's holotype is incomplete, though what is preserved, when measured from the anterior (front) tip of the premaxilla to the posterior (rear) border of the glenoid fossa, is 35 cm (14 in) in length; measured at the zygomatic arches, it is 38 cm (15 in) in width. Overall, the skull was around fifty percent larger than that of Patriofelis. It was similarly short, broad, and massively built. The mandible was deep, with a heavy symphysis. Granger's diagnosis of S. mongoliensis was based primarily on dental characteristics. The lower incisors were very small, displaced into a more posterior position by the massive, robust, and unusually anteriorly-placed canines. Both the upper and lower sets of premolars were large, and formed rectilinear cutting blades. The second upper one was offset into a position diagonal to the rest of the tooth row. The first upper molar formed a large shearing tooth with a small protocone. The Hunter-Schreger bands (HSBs) of S. mongoliensis' teeth are zigzag; this anatomical trait correlates well with osteophagous (bone-consuming) dietary habits.

== Palaeobiology ==
=== Diet ===
Because of its extremely enormous size, Sarkastodon likely was a selective hunter and bioenergetically restricted to preying on very large and slow megaherbivores. Its zigzag pattern of HSBs indicates its teeth were adapted for very high mechanical loading and strongly suggests that Sarkastodon was very frequently osteophagous.

== Palaeoenvironment ==
The first Sarkastodon specimen to be recovered came from the Irdin Manha Formation in Inner Mongolia, specifically the Chimney Butte site, also known as the Wulanhuxiu site, or simply by "eight miles north of Tukhum Lamasery". Also known from the Chimney Butte locality are the turtles cf. Adocus, Anosteira, Testudo, and an indeterminate trionychid, the birds Eogrus, Telecrex, and an indeterminate buteonine (hawk), the pantodont Pantolambdodon, the rodents Boromys and Saykanomys, the lagomorph Shamolagus, the didymoconid Kennatherium, and the paraceratheriid rhinocerotoid Forstercooperia.
