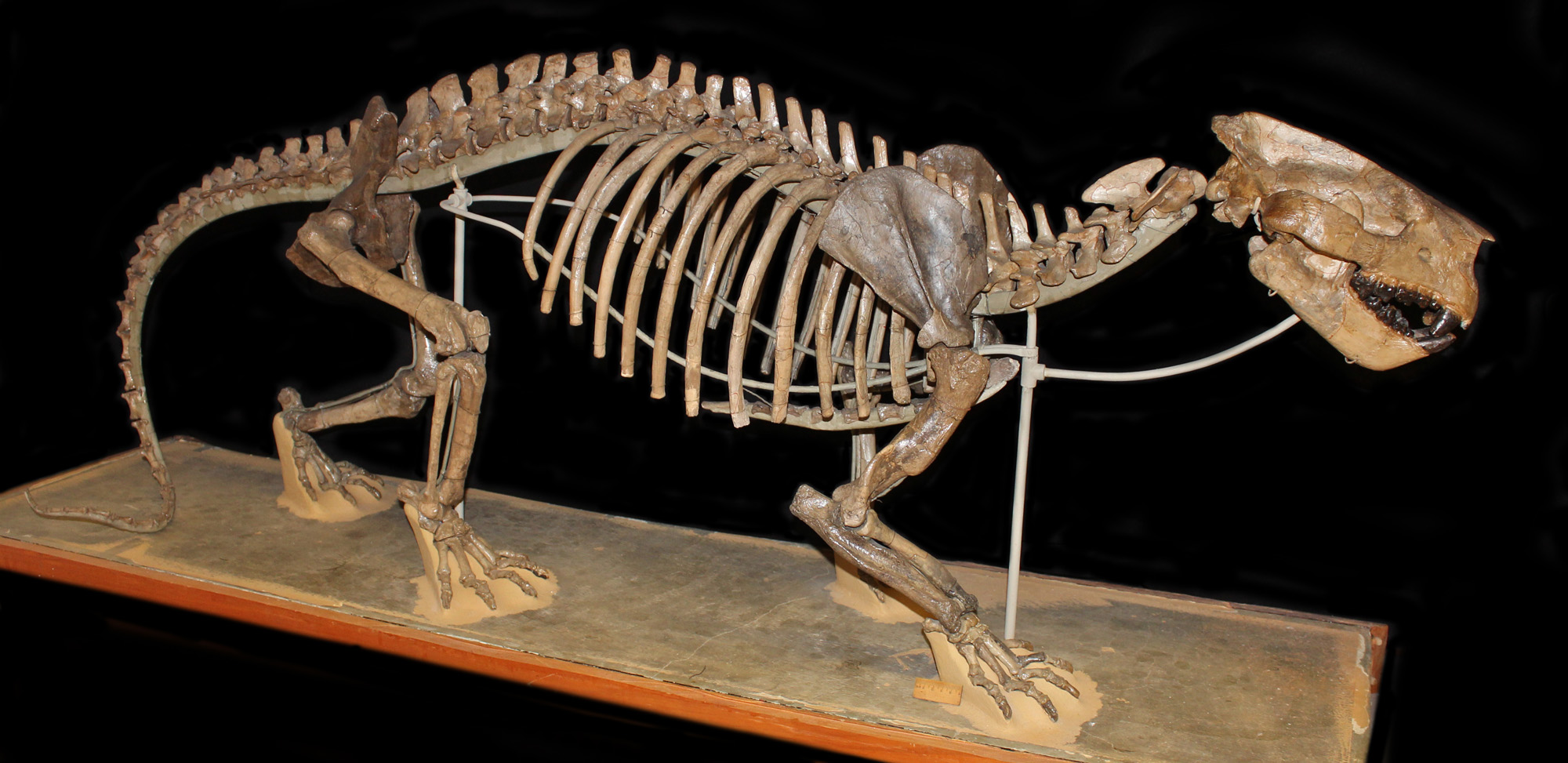
- Patriofelis ferox skeleton in storage at the American Museum of Natural History

Scientific classification
- Kingdom: Animalia
- Phylum: Chordata
- Class: Mammalia
- Order: †Oxyaenodonta
- Family: †Oxyaenidae
- Subfamily: †Oxyaeninae
- Genus: †Patriofelis; Leidy, 1872

Type species
- †Patriofelis ulta Leidy, 1870

Species
- †Patriofelis ferox (Marsh, 1872); †Patriofelis ulta (Leidy, 1870)

Synonyms
- synonyms of genus: Aelurotherium (Adams, 1896); Limnofelis (Marsh, 1872); Oreocyon (Marsh, 1872); synonyms of species: P. ferox: Aelurotherium bicuspis (Wortman, 1901); Aelurotherium latidens (Marsh, 1872); Aelurotherium leidyana; Aelurotherium leidyanum; Limnofelis ferox; Limnofelis latidens (Marsh, 1872); Oreocyon latidens (Marsh, 1872); Patriofelis latidens (Marsh, 1872); Patriofelis leidyanus (Osborn & Wortman, 1892); Patriofelis vorax; P. ulta: Ambloctonus coloradensis (Matthew, 1909); Patriofelis coloradensis (Matthew, 1909); Patriofelis compressa (Denison, 1937)

= Patriofelis =

Patriofelis Temporal range: Early-Middle Eocene (Bridgerian), 50.3–46.2 Ma

Extinct genus of carnivores

Patriofelis ("father of cats") is an extinct genus of carnivorous placental mammals from the extinct subfamily Oxyaeninae within the extinct family Oxyaenidae, which lived from the early to middle Eocene, during the Bridgerian stage of NALMA. The first remains were discovered in 1869 by geologist Ferdinand Vandeveer Hayden, and the genus was named the following year by Joseph Leidy. Over the next few decades, additional specimens would be named from the same locality (or similar ones), many assigned to genera of their own or to separate species within Patriofelis. Now, only two are recognised: Patriofelis ulta, the type species, from the lower Bridger Formation and the Huerfano Formation of Colorado, and P. ferox, from the lower Bridger and lower Washakie Formations of Wyoming and Colorado, and the Clarno Formations at the John Day Fossil Beds National Monument, Oregon.

Patriofelis is the largest oxyaenid to preserve postcranial fossils (fossils which come from behind the skull). P. ulta, the smaller species, has been estimated at around 30.66 kg (67.6 lb), while the larger P. ferox has been estimated at 55.06 kg (121.4 lb). Patriofelis had a skull around the same size as of that of a lion, though shorter and broader in a way often likened to otters. A semi-aquatic lifestyle has been suggested for Patriofelis, though there are aspects of its anatomy which make this very unlikely. Its backbone was stiffened by bony structures which projected from its vertebrae, inhibiting the usual mammalian swimming method, in which the spine undulates up and down. Originally it was suggested to be a turtle specialist, though its teeth were not adapted for crushing, but rather for slicing. While some older sources reported that Patriofelis had limited arm flexibility, recent studies have shown that its forearms were capable of a great degree of pronation and supination. Though there are various hypotheses for how Patriofelis lived, the most likely is that it was a terrestrial ambush predator which hunted by grappling its prey.

Patriofelis was among the top predators of at least some localities, competing with certain crocodyliformsns and with mesonychids. During the early to middle Eocene, much of North America was covered in wet subtropical forest and marshland, and Patriofelis was present in geologic formations corresponding to both of these environments. It has been suggested that the extinction of the genus, along with other oxyaenids, corresponded with a shift in available habitat, as the end of the Eocene was marked by a period of cooling and drying which led to the replacement of dense, swampy, forests to more temperate open forests.

== History ==
=== Early history ===
Some time in 1869, geologist Ferdinand Vandeveer Hayden recovered a pair of partial mandibular rami (the structures which comprise each side of the lower jaw) from strata belonging to the Bridger Formation. These bones were later catalogued as USNM V105. In a March 1870 publication in the Proceedings of the Philadelphia Academy, palaeontologist Joseph Leidy described the jaw scientifically, making it the holotype of a new genus and species, Patriofelis ulta. He believed that P. ulta was an early member of Felidae, the cat family, hence its name. Two years later, in August 1872, Othniel Charles Marsh described the remains of a "gigantic Carnivore" from the same locality, to which he assigned the name Limnofelis ferox. Marsh's specimen consisted of skull material (including a lower jaw), vertebrae, and "other less important parts of the skeleton". Marsh also described a second species, L. latidens, from an upper premolar from the same locality.

In the summer of 1879, Jacob Lawson Wortman discovered teeth and limb bones from another specimen. These remains came to the attention of Edward Drinker Cope, who, in 1880, gave them the binomial name of Protopsalis tigrinus. In 1892, Wortman suggested a second Protopsalis, P. leidyanus, based on remains in the Princeton Collection. Two years later, Wortman published a paper discussing the osteology of Patriofelis ulta. He determined that the other taxa could be rendered junior synonyms, as there was no convincing evidence in the form of diagnostic traits that they were different taxa. Several other species have been described which have been consistently synonymised, leaving only P. ferox and P. ulta as valid species.

Two relatively complete specimens of Patriofelis (UMNH VP 550 and CM 87673) have been discovered in the interim, both in 1953. The first of these served as the foundation of a 1957 paper on P. ulta's skull anatomy by Charles Lewis Gazin. Both were redescribed by Anne E. Kort and colleagues in 2022, and served as the basis of a description of Patriofelis' postcranial anatomy.

=== Classification ===
Patriofelis is a member of the family Oxyaenidae, which is in turn part of the order Oxyaenodonta. Oxyaenids were at one point considered members of a larger order, Creodonta, alongside hyaenodonts. More recent papers have not supported the monophyly of creodonts, and the link between the two is predicated largely on the presence of a blade on the metastyle of the first molar, a trait present in many eutherians.

== Description ==
=== Size ===
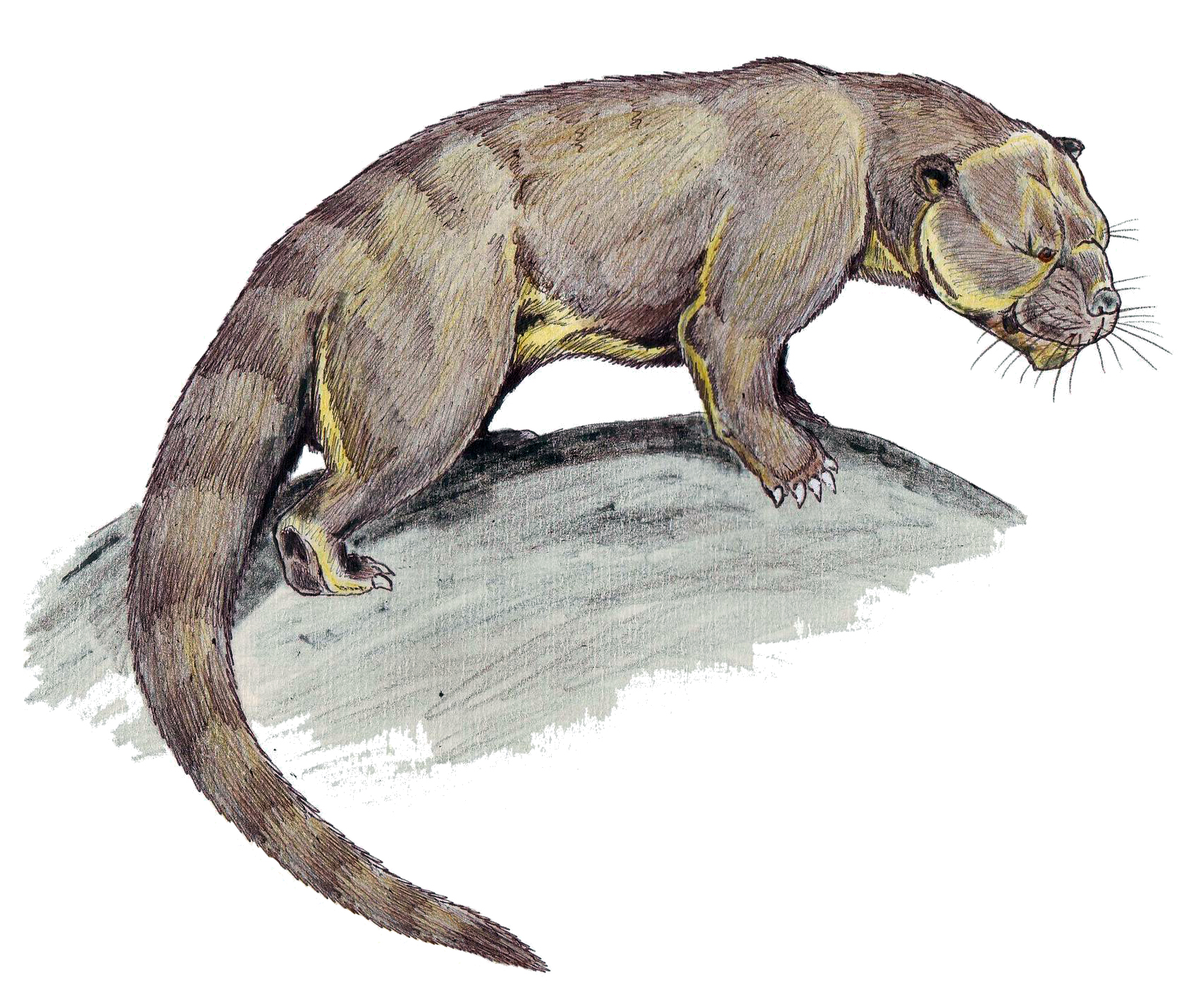
Reconstruction of P. ferox

Patriofelis is the largest oxyaenid from which postcranial remains are known. Wortman suggested that its overall body size was roughly equal to that of a black bear, though was working under the assumption of felid affinities. The type species, of Patriofelis, P. ulta, was the smaller species, weighing at least 30 kg (66 lb). Sorkin, in his 2008 paper, suggested P. ferox was comparable to Thylacosmilus in size, which weighed 150 kg (330 lb) within the paper. In a 2010 publication, Michael Morlo, Gregg F. Gunnell, and Doris Nagel provided general body mass estimates for both Patriofelis species of 30–100 kg (66–220 lb). In a 2024 paper, Mark S. Juhn and colleagues used a scaling method proposed by Van Valkenburgh in 1990, wherein the size of the largest lower molar was used in a regression analysis, to calculate the body sizes of various extinct mammalian predators, listing their mass estimates in their supplemental materials. Using this method they obtained a body mass of 30.66 kg (67.6 lb) for P. ulta, and a larger body mass of 55.06 kg (121.4 lb) for the larger P. ferox.

=== Skull ===
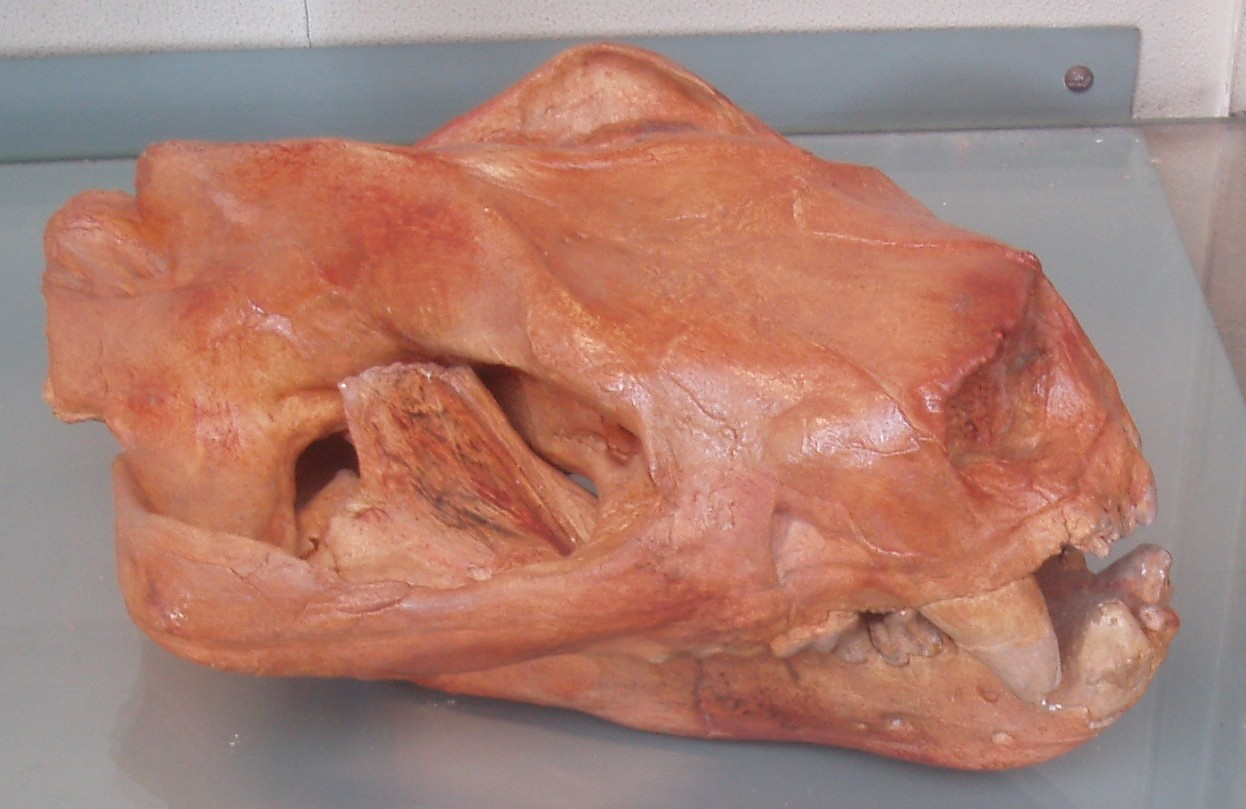
Skull of Patriofelis ulta at Muséum national d'Histoire naturelle, Paris

The skull of Patriofelis ulta described by Wortman was roughly the same size as that of a lion. He noted that it was fairly short, broad and low, and he likened it to the skulls of seals, though his initial restoration was inaccurate in that it depicted the skull as higher than it actually would have been. Charles Lewis Gazin noted that not only was the modification of its skull more extreme than how Wortman had depicted it, but it was superficially akin to that of an otter. The premaxilla in P. ulta was fairly reduced, forming a narrow rim of bone along the anterior (front) margin of the maxilla. The maxillae were fairly short when viewed from the side, although their nasal processes were very long, extending posteriorly (rearward) over the lacrimal bones. The nasals of P. ulta were broad anteriorly, tapering posteriorly and widening yet again around the sutures between the maxillae and frontals, after which they once again tapered. The frontals were broad anteriorly and tapered posteriorly. The parietals were long and slender, supporting a fairly well-developed sagittal crest. P. ulta's orbits (eye sockets) were not particularly large, though were positioned dorsally (high up) on the skull. The zygomatic arches, formed from the jugals and squamosals, were broad and massively built. The mastoid regions of the temporal bones were very large and prominent, and the paroccipitals were conspicuous. P. ulta's braincase was overall very small, with very thick walls. As with the rest of the skull, P. ulta's mandible (lower jaw) was heavy and robust, with short mandibular rami and mandibular symphyses. It is fairly rounded anteriorly. The condyles of the masseteric fossa were fairly low, extending quite far transversely (across) and being structured similarly to those of cats. The fossa was fairly rounded in angle, similar to that of Oxyaena.

==== Brain endocast ====
The brain anatomy of P. ulta is known in part from an endocast. Its cerebellum was fairly large, with a thickly walled cavity, and was not at all covered by the cerebral lobes. As in many Palaeogene mammalian carnivores, the cerebral cavity had at least two longitudinal convolutions. It is not certain if a crucial sulcus was present.

=== Dentition ===
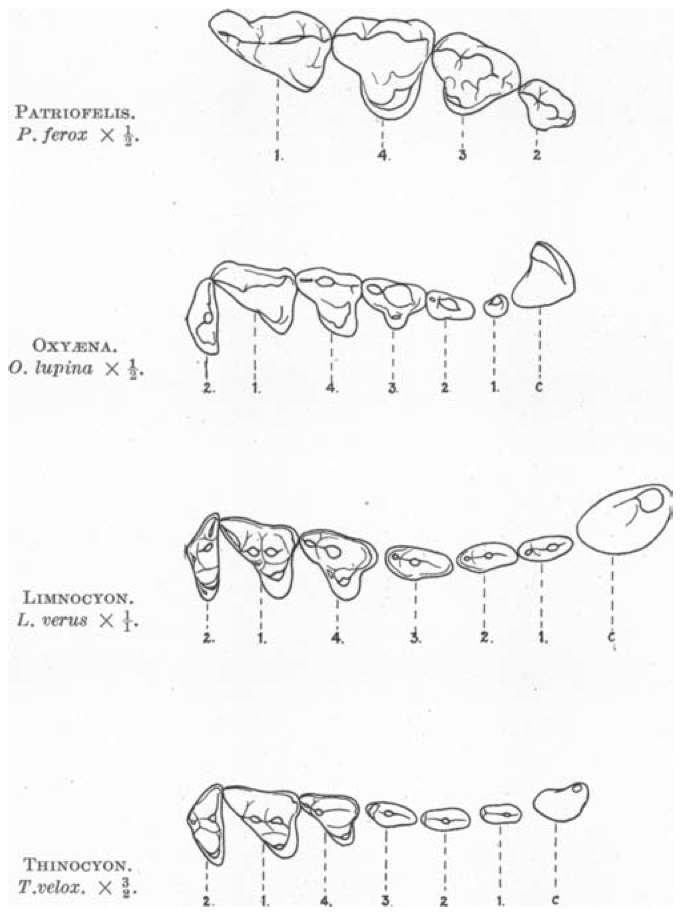
Cheek teeth of Patriofelis compared with the dentition of other Bridger Basin oxyaenids

The dental formula of Patriofelis is uncertain, though was rendered by Gazin as 2.1.3.1–22–3.1.3.2 × 2 = 32–34. (Note: The lower tooth count assumes 2 incisors, 1 canine, 3 premolars, and 1 molar on the upper jaw, and 2 incisors, 1 canine, 3 premolars, and 2 molars on the lower, for a total of 32 teeth. The higher assumes 3 incisors, 1 canine, 3 premolars, and 2 molars on the upper jaw, and 3 incisors, 1 canine, 3 premolars, and 2 molars on the lower jaw, for a total of 34 teeth) Its teeth were very robust in comparison to other oxyaenid teeth, and have been variously compared to those of felids, or to those of hyaenids. The upper incisors were fairly simple, with the medial (inner) pair being smaller than the lateral (outer) pair. The lateral pair were far larger and were somewhat caniniform. The true upper canines were very robust, with deep roots. They were oval-shaped in cross section, as opposed to being sabrelike or laterally compressed, and in the specimen studied by Gazin they had been blunted by wear. In 1900, Henry Fairfield Osborn noted that oxyaenid cheek teeth bore adaptations for slicing and for cutting into bone, such as the loss of the talonid, as in felids. True bone-crushing is unlikely, at least in Patriofelis, as P. ulta's dentition overall lacks adaptations for durophagy. P. ulta lacked a first upper premolar. The second was simple, with two roots and a broad posterior region. The third had three roots with a small anterior cuspule. The fourth had a higher anterior cusp, and a projection (also found in the preceding teeth, albeit smaller) which was equal in size to the main cusp but more bladelike in morphology. The first upper molar formed a carnassial, a specialised shearing blade, while the second, if present, was small and peglike, and difficult to make out due to its angle. The number of lower incisors apparently varied between specimens, though the one studied by Gazin had two. As with the upper jaw, the lateral lower incisor was the larger one, though was less procumbent. Both sets were somewhat blunted due to wear. The canines were robust, massively rooted, and close together, and were similarly worn. The second lower premolar of P. ulta was separated from the canine by a short diastema (gap), whereas that of P. ferox was oblique to it. It was double-rooted and broad. The third was similar but far larger and more robust. The fourth was larger still, with higher cusps and a more pronounced crest on its lingual (inner) margin. It was tilted backwards somewhat. The first lower molar was small, with a metaconid which extended upward and posterolingually (inward and rearward) from the protoconid. Similar to the first upper molar, the second lower molar formed a shearing surface and lacked a talonid.

=== Postcranial skeleton ===
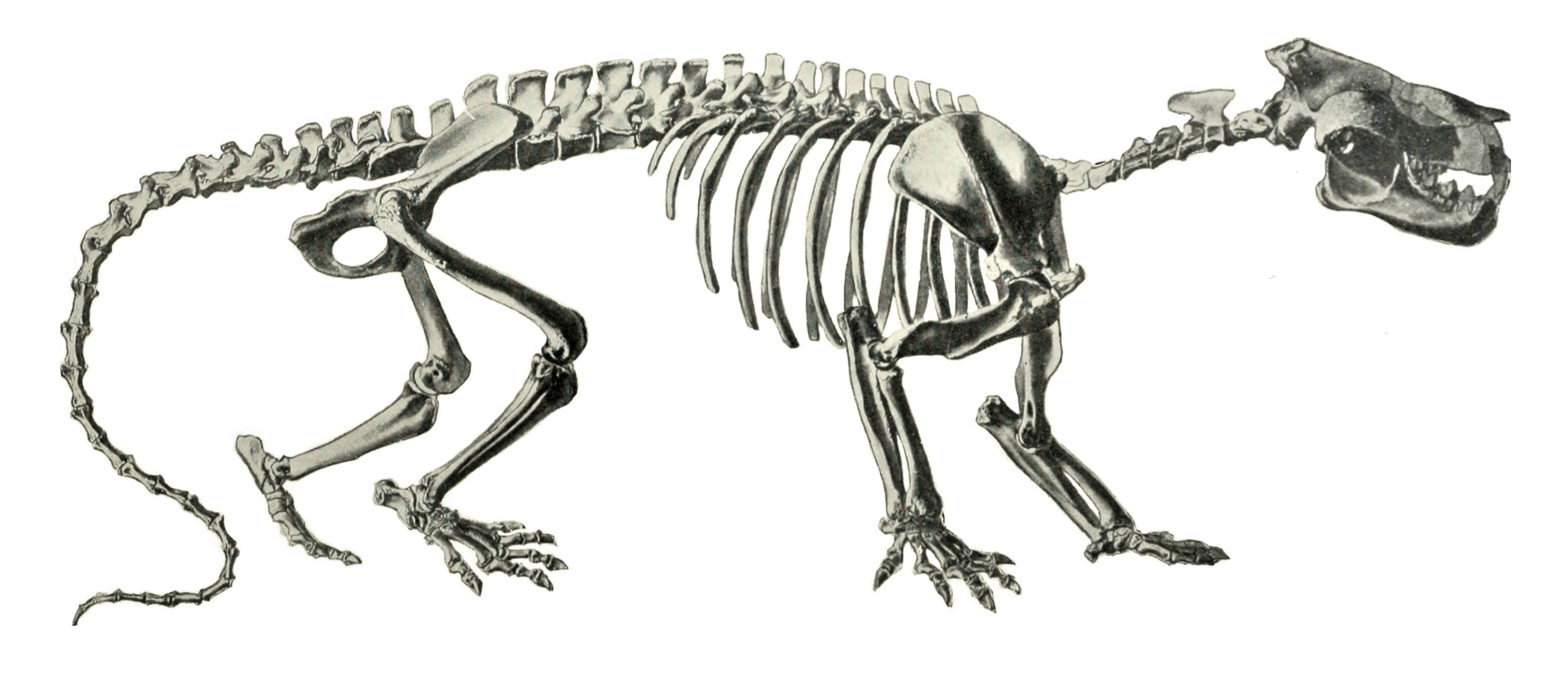
Reconstructed skeleton of Patriofelis by Robert Bruce Horsfall

Patriofelis had seven cervical (neck) vertebrae, of which five are known from UMNH VP 550. In both species, all of the vertebrae beyond the axis had robust transverse processes. The sixth cervical vertebra is long and angled more ventrally than in modern carnivorans. No neural spines are known from P. ulta, although those of P. ferox were decently large, and it is likely the same is true of both species. Beyond the neck, Patriofelis' spinal column bore a series of interlocking projections called revolute zygapophyses, which would have restricted the mobility of the spine. The thoracic (upper back) vertebrae, of which there were thirteen, were smaller than the lumbar (lower back) vertebrae, with proportionally larger vertebral centra. There were six lumbar vertebrae, which bore flat-fronted centra with strong inferior (lower) keels, giving them a shape like a trihedron. There were three sacral vertebrae. The sacrum overall was robust to in order to support both the vertebrae in front of it and a large, powerful tail. There were twenty-eight caudal (tail) vertebrae, with the anterior ones being larger and more robust than those further back. The tail overall was unusually long and thick in comparison to that of many former creodonts.

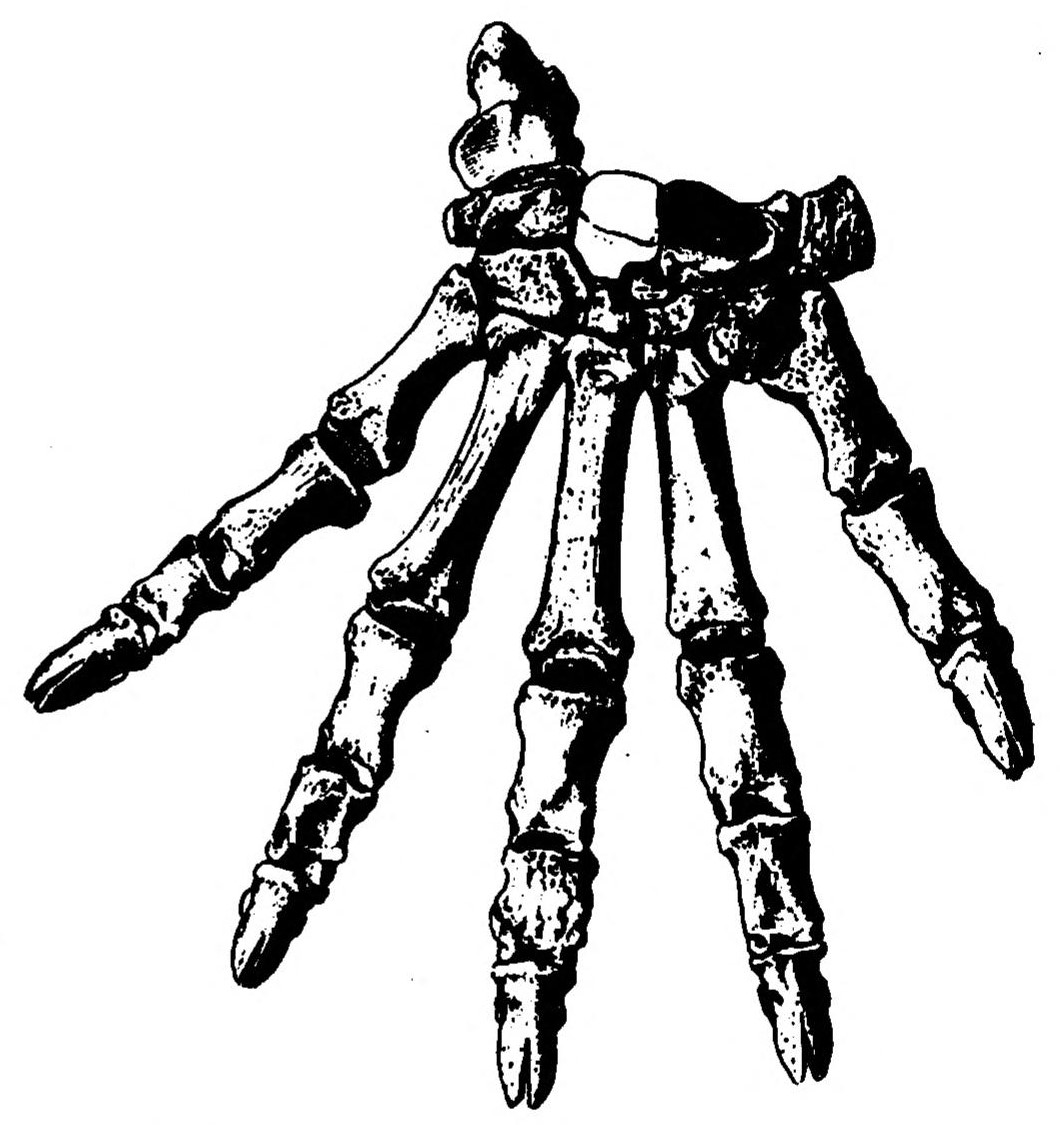
Patriofelis ferox right manus

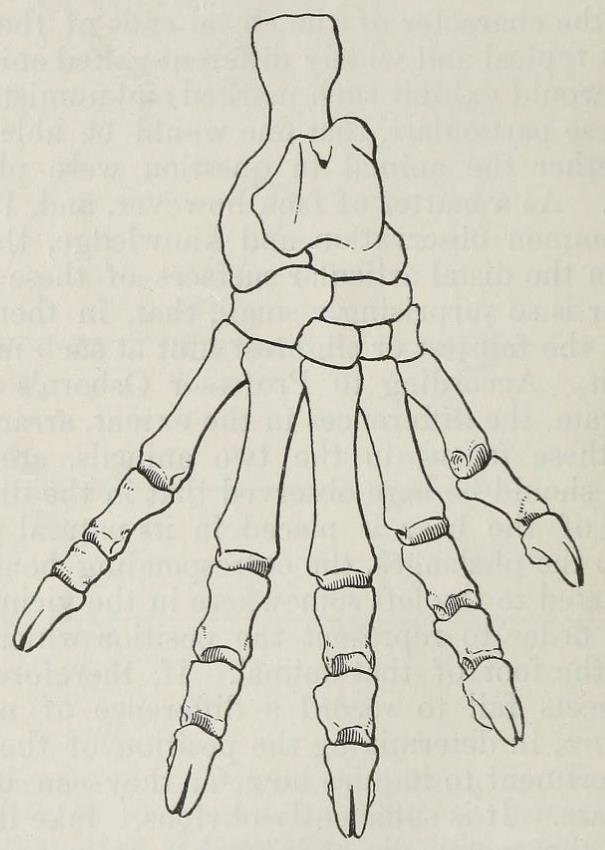
Patriofelis ferox right pes

The limbs of Patriofelis, particularly its forelimbs, were fairly short and robust. The deltopectoral crest of the humerus (the long bone of the upper forelimb) was "immensely developed", extending two-thirds down the length of the humeral shaft. Regressions found the humeri of Patriofelis to have been more robust than any felid. In the case of P. ferox, the scar on the deltoid of the deltopectoral crest was located more distally than a felid of comparable size. The bones of the forearm were extremely robust, especially the ulna. The ulna had a very robust, medially angled olecranon; it and the semilunar notch account for about a third of the bone's total length, longer than that of carnivorans. Though some have interpreted the morphology of the radius as a sign that Patriofelis was capable only of limited arm rotation, it is likely that it was capable of a strong degree of both pronation and supination. The metacarpals (the bones of the forefeet) were short and robust, arranged and angled in such a way that the feet would likely have been splayed in life, and the same is true of the hind feet. Each digit was tipped in thick, blunt claws. The ilium of Patriofelis was fairly small compared to the ischium and pubis, and was trihedral in cross-section due to the presence of a pronounced ridge running along its lateral surface. The acetabulum was fairly shallow. The trochanteric fossa of the femur (the long bone of the upper hindlimb) was deep, extending quite far down the posterior part of the bone. The distal portion of the femur is not known, so the full extent of the fossa is not certain, though it exceeds what is seen in carnivorans. The tibia is slender in comparison to the femur, though is still fairly robust. It bore a prominent cnemial crest, larger than that of Oxyaena. The proximal end of the fibula is characterised by a very robust interosseous crest (one between the tibia and fibula). The patellas (kneecaps) of Patriofelis were similar to those of carnivorans, being generally teardrop-shaped. The calcaneum was fairly robust and generally resembled that of carnivorans with a plantigrade gait, one where the entire foot, including the heel, was pressed flat on the ground while walking. The metatarsals were relatively short and were quite homogenous in length, although the first was shorter than the others and the third was longer.

== Palaeobiology ==
=== Locomotion ===
J. L. Wortman initially suggested that Patriofelis was a semi-aquatic, otter-like predator. Henry Fairfield Osborn disagreed with this assessment, arguing in 1900 that it was an arboreal predator which behaved similarly to cats. William Diller Matthew in 1909 disagreed with both ideas, as its short limbs and blunt claws would have made it more suited for hunting on the ground. In their 2022 reassessment of Patriofelis' postcranial anatomy, Anne E. Kort and colleagues also re-examined its palaeobiology. They noted that its spinal column bore interlocking structures known as revolute zygapophyses, which would have considerably reduced spinal mobility, thus heavily restricting the sagittal (up-and-down) motion many mammals use to swim. Furthermore, such inflexibility would have reduced its climbing ability, as arboreal habits require a wide range of motion throughout the dorsal vertebrae. It also lacked the long phalanges (digit bones) and curved claws demanded by such a lifestyle. Korte and colleagues concluded that Patriofelis was probably a terrestrial ambush hunter, one adapted for grappling prey with its strong forelimbs with inflexible lumbar vertebrae potentially resisting torsion and breakage in the spine during struggles with prey or other predators.

=== Diet ===
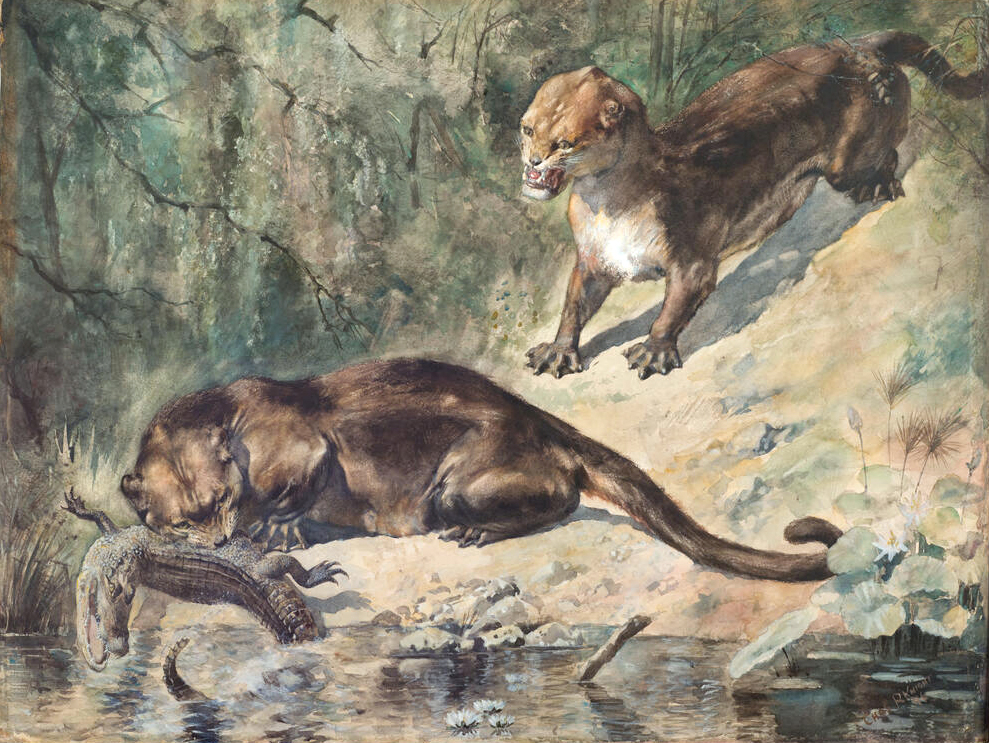
An outdated otter-like depiction of Patriofelis ferox by Charles R. Knight, from 1896

Because of its proposed semi-aquatic lifestyle, robust nature of its jaws, and worn down condition of its dentition, Wortman hypothesized Patriofelis fed upon turtles. In their 2022 paper, Kort and colleagues challenged Wortman's initial hypothesis that it might have specialised in hunting turtles, partly due to its energetic demands and because Patriofelis did not have the dentition necessary for a durophagous lifestyle. Instead, it would've medium to large sized herbivores such as brontotheres and uintatheriids, as well as perissodactyls such as Hyrachyus and Helaletes, and other extinct placentals such as Stylinodon and Trogosus. However, Hunter-Schreger bands of Patriofelis was noted to be similar to the closely related Oxyaena, which showed a transition from undulating HSB to zigzag HSB. Both genera showed similarities to hyenas, suggesting they had a osteophagous (bone-consuming) diet.

== Palaeoecology ==
Patriofelis lived in North America during the Bridgerian North American Land Mammal Age, or NALMA (part of the early-middle Eocene, 50.3–46.2 Ma). Fossils of both species have been found in formations in Wyoming (Bridger), Colorado (Huerfano and Washakie), and Oregon (Clarno).

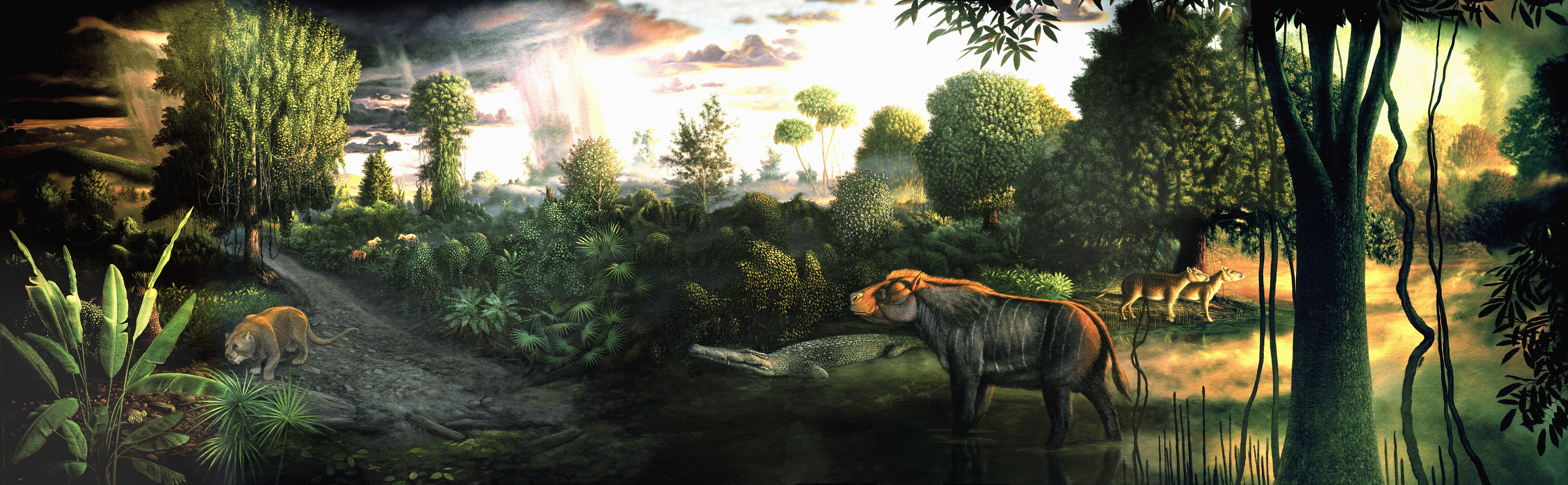
Mural of the Clarno Nut Beds by Larry Felder

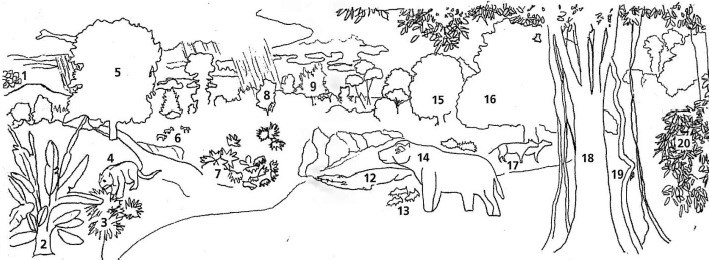
Key for the above image; with "4" being Patriofelis

One of the environments Patriofelis (specifically P. ferox) inhabited, the depositional environment for the so-called Nut Beds of the Clarno Formation, is the most biodiverse assemblage of fossil flora yet recorded, preserving 66 genera and 76 species of trees and around 173 species of plants overall. Some of the Nut Beds flora is known exclusively from wood, though other plants are known from additional material. Overall there is great floral overlap between the Nut Beds and modern environments, with hamamelidaceans (witch-hazels), rosaceans (roses and their relatives), and pinaceans (pine trees) being known, among others. The reconstructed palaeoenvironment of the Clarno Formation indicates that Patriofelis would have inhabited wet, semitropical forested ecosystems, of the sort which covered much of North America during the early-middle Eocene.

Patriofelis is also known from the Black Forks Member, the lower member (consisting of Units A and B) of the Bridger Formation, which preserves an environment which alternated between marshlands with braided streams and vast yet shallow lakes. It also preserves the same kind of semitropical forest as the Clarno Formation. Both species of Patriofelis are recorded in the Bridger Formation, although only P. ulta is known from the lower portion. Also known from the Black Forks Member are catfish, salamanders, frogs, varanid lizards, boas, turtles, several crocodyliforms (including the fully terrestrial Boverisuchus vorax), the primates Anaptomorphus, Notharctus, Omomys, Trogolemur, Smilodectes, and Uintasorex, the tillodonts Trogosus and Tillodon, the pholidotans (pangolin relatives) Metacheiromys and Tetrapassalus mckennai, various rodents in the families Cylindrodontidae, Paramyidae, and Sciuravidae, the mesonychids Harpagolestes and Mesonyx, the hyaenodonts Limnocyon, Sinopa, Thinocyon, and Tritemnodon, the oxyaenodont Machaeroides, the carnivoraforms Miacis, Oodectes, Palaearctonyx, Uintacyon, Viverravus, and Vulpavus, the hyopsodont Hyopsodus, the dinoceratan Bathyopsis, the equid Orohippus, the brontotheres Limnohyops and Palaeosyops, the helaletid Helaletes, the hyrachyid Hyrachyus, the dichobunids Antiacodon and Microsus, and the helohyid Helohyus.

In a 2019 thesis, Anne E. Kort noted that Patriofelis would have been among the top predators, alongside crocodilians and perhaps the mesonychids, of the environments it inhabited. However, compared to Patriofelis, mesonychids had dentition more adapted for scavenging, were more cursorial, and had a broader distribution.

=== Extinction ===
In her 2019 thesis, Anne K. Kort suggested that the extinction of the genus, and perhaps of oxyaenids as a whole the inability to adapt to changing environments. During the second half of the Eocene, dense, swampy, subtropical forests transitioned to more temperate, open forests. The short, flexible limbs, and plantigrade feet would've been advantageous in navigating through swampy, dense forests, but detrimental in large open environments. In addition, the inflexible spine of Patriofelis further prevented long distance mobility due to the restricted sagittal movements of the spine in locomotion. Patriofelis was successful in densely, swampy forested environments, however it lost that ability as forests became less dense and in addition to their prey, perissodactyls and artiodactyls, already adapted cursorial features prior to the environmental shifts. Patriofelis was also large hypercarnivore, which made it more vulnerable to extinction.
