= Haughtoniana =

Scientific classification
- Domain: Eukaryota
- Kingdom: Animalia
- Phylum: Chordata
- Clade: Synapsida
- Genus: †Haughtoniana; Boonstra, 1938

Haughtoniana is an extinct genus of non-mammalian synapsid.

== See also ==
- List of therapsids
