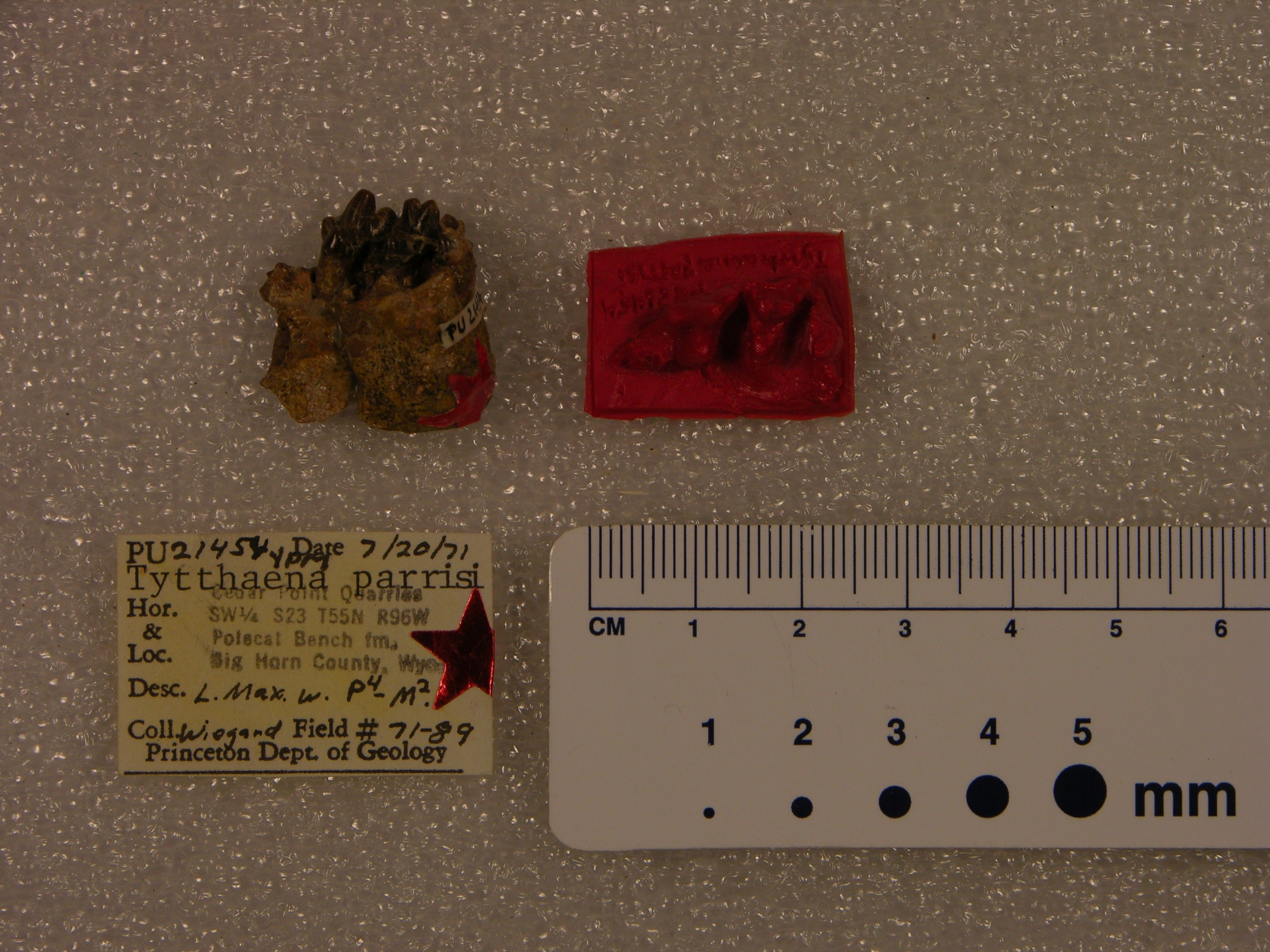
- part of left maxilla of Tytthaena parrisi

Scientific classification
- Domain: Eukaryota
- Kingdom: Animalia
- Phylum: Chordata
- Class: Mammalia
- Clade: Pan-Carnivora
- Order: †Oxyaenodonta
- Family: †Oxyaenidae
- Subfamily: †Tytthaeninae; Gunnell & Gingerich, 1991
- Genus: †Tytthaena; Gingerich, 1980

Type species
- †Tytthaena parrisi Gingerich, 1980

Species
- †T. lichna (Rose, 1981); †T. parrisi Gingerich, 1980

Synonyms
- synonyms of subfamily: Tyttaeninae Lavrov, 1999; synonyms of genus: Tyttaena Lavrov, 1999; synonyms of species: T. lichna: Oxyaena lichna Rose, 1981

= Tytthaena =

Tytthaena Temporal range: 58.9–55.4 Ma late Paleocene - early Eocene

Extinct genus of mammals

Tytthaena ("little hyena") is an extinct genus of placental mammals from extinct subfamily Tytthaeninae within extinct family Oxyaenidae, that lived in North America from the late Paleocene to early Eocene.

== Description ==
Tytthaena is the smallest oxyaenid known. Morphologically, it resembles Oxyaena. It can be distinguished from other oxyaenids by its size and dentition. Its molars were narrow, with elongate talonids.
