= Dabrazhin Formation =

Kazakh geological formation

- Stratigraphic range: Santonian-Campanian; ~85–71 Ma
- Type: Geological formation

Lithology
- Primary: Conglomerate
- Other: Sandstone

Location
- Coordinates: 41.7°N 68.5°E
- Approximate paleocoordinates: 35.1°N 62.0°E
- Region: Ongtüstik Qazaqstan; Asht
- Country: Kazakhstan, Tajikistan
- Dabrazhin Formation (Kazakhstan)

The Dabrazhin Formation (Russian: Dabrazinskaya Svita) preserves dinosaur fossils in Kazakhstan and Tajikistan. There are indeterminate remains of sauropods, nodosaurs, ornithomimosaurs, and other reptiles.

The strata date back to the Late Cretaceous. Dinosaur remains are among the fossils that have been recovered from the formation.

== Fossil content ==
- Alectrosaurus
- Trionyx
- Aspideretes
- "Antarctosaurus" jaxartensis (Sauropod indet.) - "Femur."
- "Coeluroides" sp - An indeterminate theropod
- Jaxartosaurus aralensis - "Isolated skull roof and braincase."
- Bactrosaurus prynadai (hadrosaurid indet) "Maxilla, dentary, both with teeth."
- Kazaklambia convincens (lambeosaurine dinosaur)

== See also ==
- List of dinosaur-bearing rock formations
