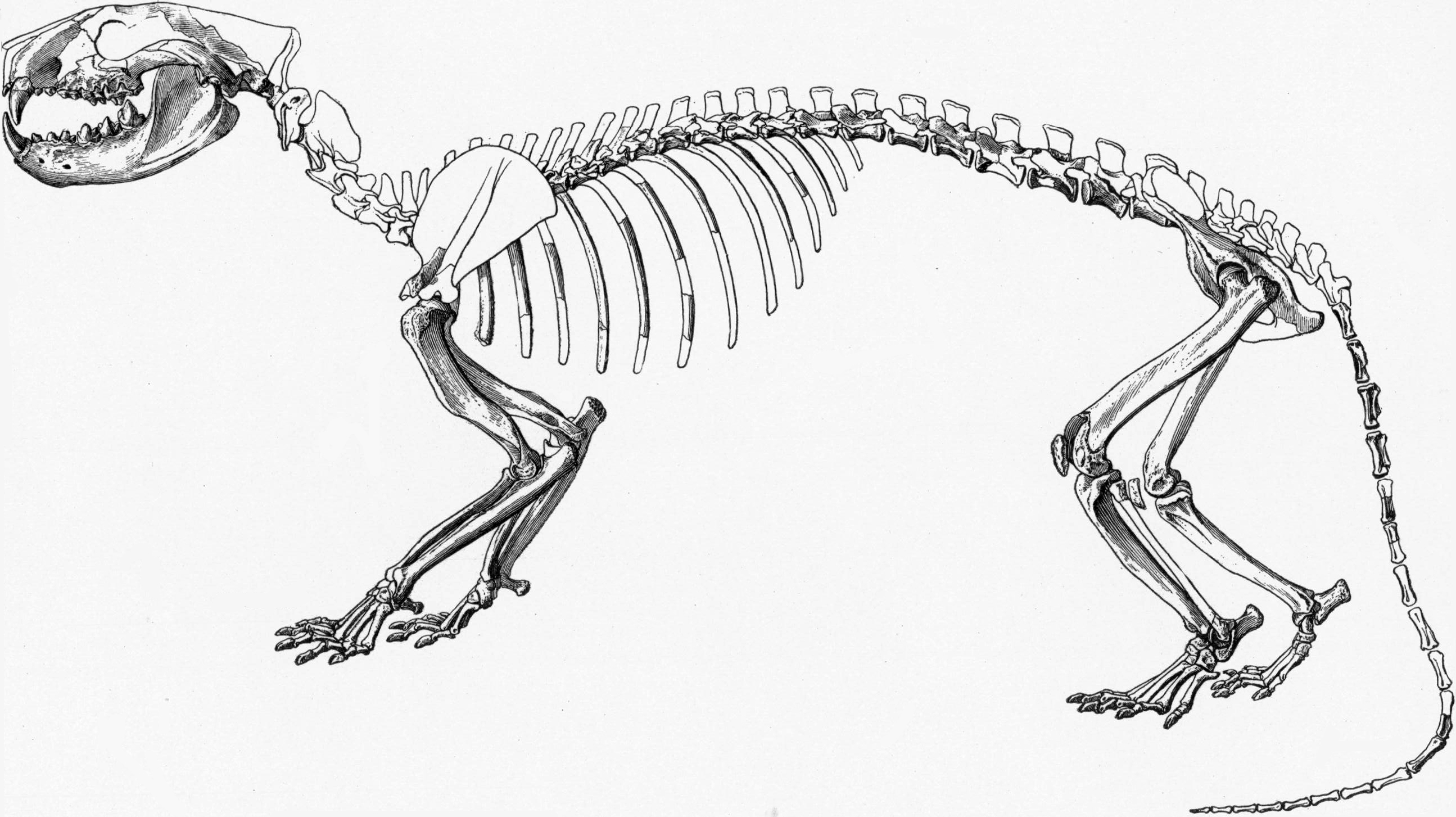
- Oxyaena lupina skeletal restoration

Scientific classification
- Kingdom: Animalia
- Phylum: Chordata
- Class: Mammalia
- Order: †Oxyaenodonta
- Family: †Oxyaenidae
- Subfamily: †Oxyaeninae
- Genus: †Oxyaena; Cope, 1874

Type species
- †Oxyaena lupina Cope, 1874

Species
- †O. forcipata (Cope, 1874); †O. gulo (Matthew & Granger, 1915); †O. intermedia (Denison, 1937); †O. lupina (Cope, 1874); †O. pardalis (Matthew & Granger, 1915); †O. simpsoni (Van Valen, 1966); †O. woutersi (Lange-Badré & Godinot, 1982)

Synonyms
- synonyms of species: O. forcipata: Oxyaena ultima (Denison, 1938); O. lupina: Oxyaena huerfanensis (Osborn, 1897); Oxyaena morsitans (Cope, 1874); O. woutersi: Arfia woutersi (Lange-Badré & Godinot, 1982)

= Oxyaena =

Oxyaena Temporal range: 56.0–50.5 Ma Early Eocene

Extinct genus of carnivores

Oxyaena ("sharp hyena") is an extinct genus of placental mammals from extinct subfamily Oxyaeninae within extinct family Oxyaenidae, that lived in Europe, Asia and North America (with most specimens being found in Colorado) during the early Eocene.

== Taxonomy ==
The name of the genus translates as "sharp hyaena" (from Ancient Greek ὀξύς- (oxús-) 'sharp' and name of hyena genus Hyaena).

== Description ==
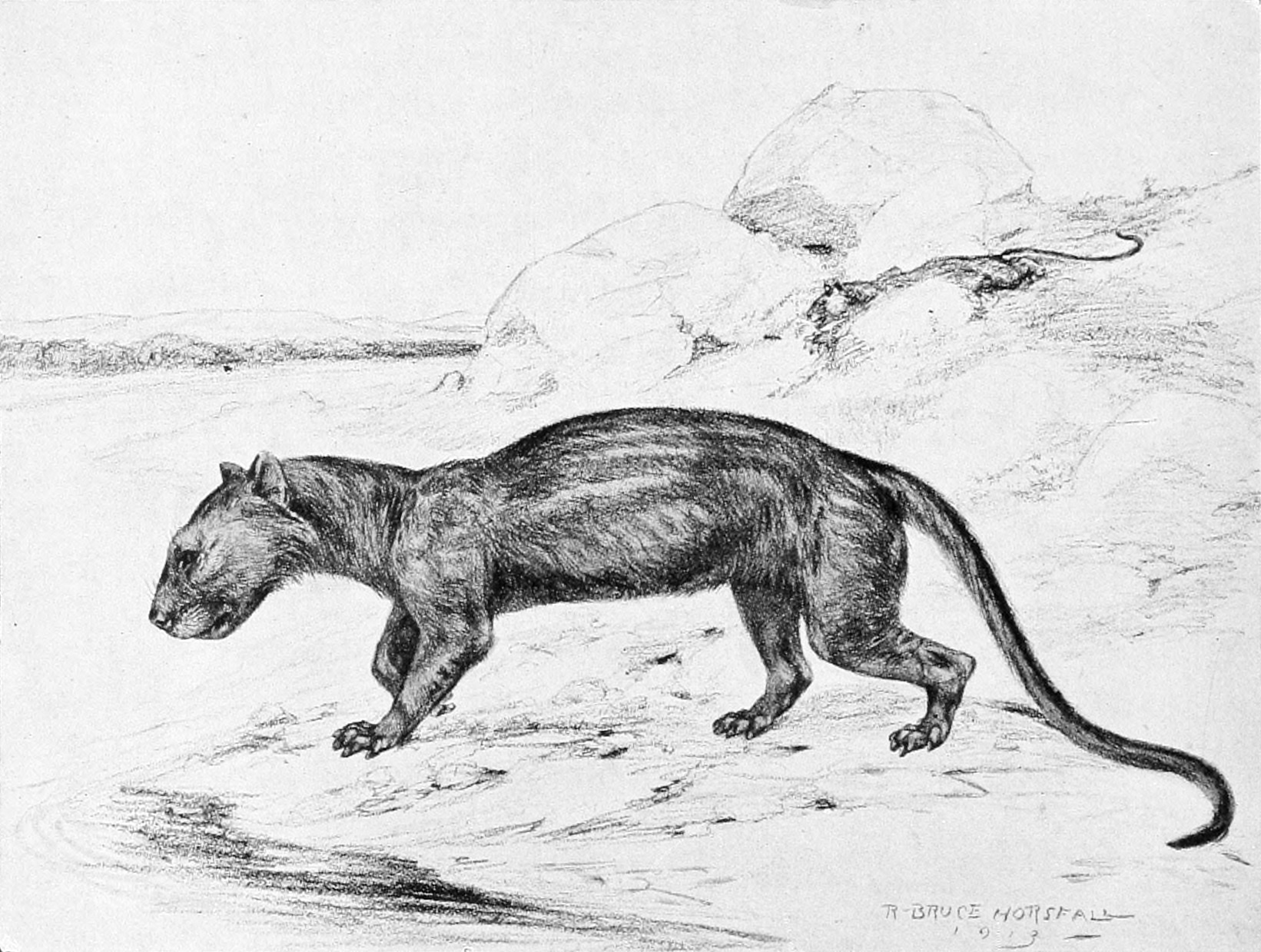
Restoration of O. lupina by Robert B. Horsfall

The species were superficially cat or wolverine-like, with a flexible body 1 metre (3.3 ft) long, and short limbs. Some species like Oxyaena forcipata were bigger with a body mass estimated to be 20 kg.

Oxyaena had a broad, low skull (20 cm long) with a long facial part and a massive lower jaw, while its body and tail were long and its five-toed limbs were short.

Oxyaenidae, a family of extinct meat-eating mammals, takes its name from this genus. Oxyaenids may have evolved in North or Central America, and tended to have long bodies and tails with short legs. Because of their shape, early studies often compared them to cats, but this body form has evolved many times in small to medium-sized forest-dwelling predators and mixed feeders, such as viverrids, mustelids, and procyonids.

Oxyaena species were plantigrade, treading on the whole surface of their soles. For this reason, these animals could not have specialized in chasing down fast-running prey. Early studies disagreed on whether they were walking, climbing, or swimming animals; more recent work suggests that like modern raccoons, they may have been able to climb trees, swim, and make a living on the ground, but were not highly specialized in any direction. An analysis of the teeth shows they were generalized feeders, like most modern raccoons and bears, rather than hypercarnivores like modern cats. The overall shape of the feeding equipment in Oxyaena was most similar to the Pleistocene bear Arctodus, which has been reconstructed as eating a range of foods similar to modern brown bears, with a preference for meat. Oxyaena species had a similar size range as modern otters, so they would have hunted small to medium-sized prey, as well as eating some other foods such as insects, crustaceans, and fruit.

== Paleoenvironment ==
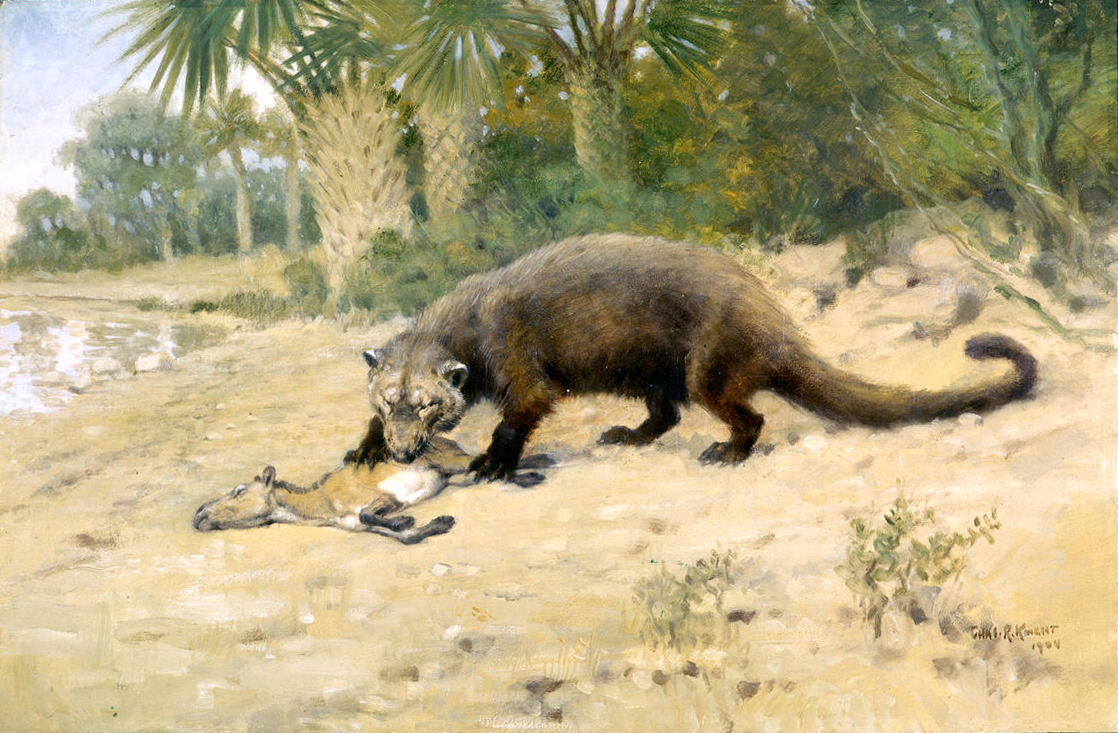
Restoration of Oxyaena eating Eohippus by Charles R. Knight

In the early Eocene of Wyoming, Oxyaena lived among early rodents, a variety of lemur-like tree-dwellers, pantodonts, and early relatives of horses and tapirs, as well as many other small to mid-sized predators and mixed feeders, including aquatic species (Paleosinopa). The fossil evidence shows that at least in Wyoming, Oxyaena lived in forests or along the margins of forest lakes and streams, and was flexible enough in its habits to survive significant changes in the environment.
