= Hunter-Schreger band =

Feature of mammalian teeth

Hunter-Schreger bands, commonly abbreviated as HSB, are features of the enamel of the teeth in mammals, mostly placentals.

== Function ==
In HSB, enamel prisms are arranged in layers of varying thickness at about right angles to each other. HSB strengthen the enamel and prevent cracks from propagating through the tooth. HSBs tend to be more densely packed in functional cusps, although overall decussational strength is higher in guiding cusps.

== Evolution ==
HSB are first observed in Early Palaeocene mammals, but at this time the HSB occupy only a small portion of the incisor and the angle between the bands is low. By the Late Paleocene, HSB is seen to extend throughout the enamel and the bands are located at nearly right angles to each other. Under oblique reflected light HSB can be seen as dark and light strips of variable width.

== Glires ==
Among Glires, the group containing rodents, lagomorphs, and their primitive relatives, the absence of HSB from the incisors has been considered primitive. Some early representatives, including Eurymylus, lack HSB, but others, including Matutinia and some mimotonids, have double-layered incisor enamel with HSB in the inner portion (portio interna, PI). Other mimotonids have single-layered enamel with HSB. All leporids studied also exhibit this pattern, except for an early Eocene, indeterminate leporid with HSB only in the PI. Ochotonids also have HSB in the PI only.

In rodents, HSB are usually present in the PI. Three types of HSB can be separated—pauciserial, uniserial, and multiserial. Pauciserial HSB, present in some primitive Paleogene rodents, are usually three to six prisms thick and have inter-prismatic matrix (IPM) surrounding the prisms, which have irregular cross-sections. Uniserial HSB, present in most living rodents, consist of a single layer of prisms. Multiserial HSB, three to seven prisms thick, characterize the living Hystricognathi and the gundis (Ctenodactylidae) and springhares (Pedetes). There are three subtypes on the basis of the orientation of the IPM. In the first, the IPM runs mostly parallel to the HSB, but does not surround it as in pauciserial enamel; in the second, the IPM makes an angle of about 45° with the HSB; and in the third, the two are located at right angles to each other. The last type serves to further strengthen the enamel and is characteristic of the Octodontoidea.

== Carnivorans ==
Among carnivorans, the hyenas exhibit specialized HSB, which form a complex, three-dimensional zigzag pattern, a specialization for bone-eating.

The teeth of Arctodus pristinus transition between undulating to acute-angled Hunter-Schreger bands while Arctodus simus exhibited a transition between undulating to zigzag bands, demonstrating an evolution towards reinforced tooth enamel. This has been convergently evolved with giant pandas, agriotheriin bears, and Hemicyon.

== Primates ==
In humans, their average width is 50 micrometers.

== Literature cited ==
- Barycka, E. 2007. Evolution and systematics of the feliform Carnivora (subscription required). Mammalian Biology 72(5):257–282.
- Line, S.R.P. & Bergqvist, L.P. 2005. Enamel structure of Paleocene mammals of the São José de Itaboraí Basin, Brazil. 'Condylarthra', Litopterna, Notoungulata, Xenungulata, and Astrapotheria (subscription required). Journal of Vertebrate Paleontology 25(4):924–928.
- Martin, T. 1994. On the systematic position of Chaetomys subspinosus (Rodentia: Caviomorpha) based on evidence from the incisor enamel microstructure (subscription required). Journal of Mammalian Evolution 2(2):117–131.
- Martin, T. 2004. Evolution of incisor enamel microstructure in Lagomorpha (subscription required). Journal of Vertebrate Paleontology 24(2):411–426.
