= 2010 in paleomammalogy =

This paleomammalogy list records new fossil mammal taxa that were described during the year 2010, as well as notes other significant paleomammalogy discoveries and events which occurred during that year.

== Non eutherian mammals ==
Name	Status	Authors	Age	Unit	Location	Notes	Images
Acinacodus	Valid	Lopatin; Maschenko; Averianov	Early Cretaceous	Western Siberia	Russia	An amphidontid 'eutriconodont'.	
Antechinus yammal	Valid	Cramb; Hocknull	Pleistocene		Australia	A marsupial belonging to the family Dasyuridae, a species of Antechinus.	
Antechinus yuna	Valid	Cramb; Hocknull	Pleistocene		Australia	A marsupial belonging to the family Dasyuridae, a species of Antechinus.	
Canchadelphys	Valid	Goin; Abello; Chornogubsky	Early Oligocene		Argentina	A member of Didelphimorphia belonging to the superfamily Peradectoidea and the family Caroloameghiniidae. The type species is C. cristata.	
Clenia brevis	Valid	Goin; Abello; Chornogubsky	Early Oligocene		Argentina	A member of Microbiotheria, a species of Clenia.	
Eomicrobiotherium matutinum	Valid	Goin; Abello; Chornogubsky	Early Oligocene		Argentina	A member of Microbiotheria, a species of Eomicrobiotherium.	
Epiklohnia	Valid	Goin; Abello; Chornogubsky	Early Oligocene		Argentina	A member of Argyrolagoidea of uncertain phylogenetic placement. The type species is E. verticalis.	
Galadi	Valid	Travouillon; Gurovich; et al. (Note: Travouillon, Gurovich, Beck, Muirhead.)	Oligo-Miocene		Australia	A bandicoot.	
Heishanobaatar	Valid	Kusuhashi; Hu; et al. (Note: Kusuhashi, Hu, Wang, Setoguchi, Marsuoka.)	Aptian/Albian	Shahai & Fuxin	China	An eobaatarid multituberculate.	
Hondonadia parca	Valid	Goin; Abello; Chornogubsky	Early Oligocene		Argentina	A member of Bonapartheriiformes, a species of Hondonadia.	
Hondonadia praecipitia	Valid	Goin; Abello; Chornogubsky	Early Oligocene		Argentina	A member of Bonapartheriiformes, a species of Hondonadia.	
Hondonadia pumila	Valid	Goin; Abello; Chornogubsky	Early Oligocene		Argentina	A member of Bonapartheriiformes, a species of Hondonadia.	
Hutegotherium	Valid	Averianov; Lopatin; et al. (Note: Averianov, Lopatin, Krasnolutskii, Ivantsov.)	Bathonian	Itat Formation	Russia	A tegotheriid docodont. The type species is H. yaomingi.	
Juchilestes	Valid	Gao; Wilson; et al. (Note: Gao, Wilson, Luo, Maga, Meng, Wang.)	Lower Aptian	Yixian Formation	China	An amphidontid 'eutriconodont'. The type species is J. liaoningensis.	
Kielanobaatar	Valid	Kusuhashi; Hu; et al.	Aptian/Albian	Shahai and Fuxin formations	China	An albionbaatarid multituberculate.	
Klohnia major	Valid	Goin; Abello; Chornogubsky	Early Oligocene		Argentina	A member of Argyrolagoidea of uncertain phylogenetic placement, a species of Klohnia.	
Kukaodonta	Valid	Mackness	Plio-Pleistocene		Australia	A marsupial belonging to the subfamily Zygomaturinae; a new genus for "Euowenia" robusta De Vis (1891).	
Kramadolops	Valid	Goin; Abello; Chornogubsky	Late Eocene to early Oligocene		Argentina	A member of Polydolopiformes. The type species is K. mayoi (Odreman Rivas, 1978); genus also includes K. abanicoi (Flynn and Wyss, 1999) and K. mckennai (Flynn and Wyss, 2004), as well as new species K. fissuratus and K. maximus.	
Leptalestes toevsi	Valid	Hunter; Heinrich; Weishampel	Late Cretaceous	St. Mary River Formation	USA	A metatherian, a species of Leptalestes.	
Litokoala dicktedfordi	Valid	Pledge	Probably middle Miocene	Riversleigh World Heritage Area	Australia	A marsupial belonging to the family Phascolarctidae (a relative of the koala).	
Litokoala thurmerae	Valid	Pledge	Late Oligocene	Etadunna Formation	Australia	A marsupial belonging to the family Phascolarctidae (a relative of the koala).	
Nanolestes mackennai	Valid	Martin; Averianov; Pfretzschner	Oxfordian	Qigu Formation	China	An amphitheriid, a species of Nanolestes.	
Nidimys	Valid	Hunter; Heinrich; Weishampel	Upper Cretaceous	St. Mary River Formation	USA	A neoplagiaulacid multituberculate. The type species is N. occultus.	
Pachybiotherium illuminatum	Valid	Goin et al.	Miocene	Pinturas Formation	Argentina	A marsupial belonging to the group Microbiotheria.	
Paracimexomys propriscus	Valid	Hunter; Heinrich; Weishampel	Late Cretaceous	St. Mary River Formation	USA	A multituberculate, a species of Paracimexomys.	
Paressonodon	Valid	Wilson; Dechesne; Anderson	Late Cretaceous	Laramie Formation	USA	A neoplagiaulacid multituberculate. The type species is P. nelsoni.	
Parikimys	Valid	Wilson; Dechesne; Anderson	Late Cretaceous	Laramie Formation	USA	A cimolomyid multituberculate. The type species is P. carpenteri.	
Paritatodon	Valid	Martin; Averianov	Middle Jurassic (Callovian)	Balabansai Formation	Kyrgyzstan	A basal docodont. A new genus for "Shuotherium" kermacki Sigogneau-Russell, 1988.	
Patagosmilus	Valid	Forasiepi; Carlini	Miocene (Colloncuran)	Collón Curá Formation	Argentina	A member of the family Thylacosmilidae. The type species is P. goini.	
Periakros	Valid	Goin; Abello; Chornogubsky	Early Oligocene		Argentina	A member of Polydolopimorphia belonging to the suborder Hatcheriformes and the family Glasbiidae. The type species is P. ambiguus.	
Pilchenia antiqua	Valid	Goin; Abello; Chornogubsky	Early Oligocene		Argentina	A member of Palaeothentidae, a species of Pilchenia.	
Pilchenia intermedia	Valid	Goin; Abello; Chornogubsky	Early Oligocene		Argentina	A member of Palaeothentidae, a species of Pilchenia.	
Praedens	Valid	Goin; Abello; Chornogubsky	Early Oligocene		Argentina	A member of Argyrolagoidea of uncertain phylogenetic placement. The type species is P. aberrans.	
Rosendolops ebaios	Valid	Goin; Abello; Chornogubsky	Early Oligocene		Argentina	A member of Bonapartheriiformes, a species of Rosendolops.	
Simpsonodon sibiricus	Valid	Averianov; Lopatin; et al.	Bathonian	Itat Formation	Russia	A simpsonodontid docodont.	
Sineleutherus	Valid	Martin; Averianov; Pfretzschner	Oxfordian	Qigu Formation	China	A eleutherodontid allotherian.	

== Newly named eutherians ==
Name	Status	Authors	Age	Unit	Location	Notes	Images
Acristatherium	Valid	Hu; Meng; et al. (Note: Hu, Meng, Li, Wang.)	Aptian	Yixian Formation	China	An early eutherian	
Africanomys bahariyaensi	Valid	Mein; Pickford	Vallesian		Egypt	A gundi.	
Afrikanokeryx	Valid	Harris; Solounias; Geraads	Miocene	Baringo Basin	Kenya	A relative of the okapi. Its type species is A. leakeyi.	
Afrotarsius libycus	Valid	Jaeger et al.	Eocene		Libya	An early member of Anthropoidea.	
Afrotragulus	Valid	Sánchez; Quiralte; et al. (Note: Sánchez, Quiralte, Morales, Pickford.)	Early Miocene	Lothidok Formation	Kenya	A tragulid ruminant.	
Agathaeromys	Valid	Zijlstra; Madern; van den Hoek Ostende	Probably Pleistocene		Bonaire	An oryzomyine rodent. The type species is A. donovani; genus also includes A. praeuniversitatis.	
Ageitonomys	Valid	Wang Ban-Yue	Early Oligocene	Ulantatal Formation	China	A ctenodactyloid rodent. The species is A. neimongolensis.	
Ailuravus mitchelli	Valid	Hooker	Early Eocene	Blackheath Formation	United Kingdom		
Alloeumyarion	Valid	Qiu Zhu-Ding	Early Miocene	Xiacaowan Formation	China	A eumyarionine cricetid. The species is A. sihongensis.	
Altanius magnus	Valid	Maschenko & Takai	Early Eocene	Naran Bulak Formation	Mongolia	A primate of uncertain phylogenetic placement, a species of Altanius.	
Ameuromys	Valid	Mein; Pickford	Vallesian		Egypt	A murid rodent belonging to the subfamily Gerbillinae. The type species is A. grandis.	
Amphilagus wuttkei	Junior synonym?	Mörs & Kalthoff	Late Oligocene	Enspel Formation	Germany	A lagomorph, a species of Amphilagus. Considered to be a probable junior synonym of Amphilagus antiquus by Fostowicz-Frelik (2016).	
Apatemys prouti	Valid	Hooker	Early Eocene	Blackheath Formation	United Kingdom	A member of Apatemyidae.	
Apterodon rauenbergensis	Valid	Frey et al.	Oligocene (Rupelian)		Germany		
Archaeonycteris relicta	Valid	Harrison; Hooker	Eocene	Creechbarrow Limestone Formation	United Kingdom	An early bat.	
Arctocyonides jefferyi	Valid	Hooker	Early Eocene	Blackheath Formation	United Kingdom	A member of Arctocyonidae.	
Arvernoceros insolitus	Valid	Vekua; Bendukidze; Kiladze	Early Pleistocene	Dmanisi locality	Georgia	A large-sized deer.	
Atlantoxerus xiyuensis	Valid	Wei	Miocene	Halamagai Formation	China	A squirrel belonging to the tribe Xerini, a relative of the Barbary ground squirrel.	
Australopithecus sediba	Valid	Berger; de Ruiter; et al. (Note: Berger, de Ruiter, Churchill, Schmid, Carlson, Dirks, Kibii.)	Late Tertiary to Early Quaternary	Cradle of Humankind	South Africa	One of the youngest known australopithecines to date.	Australopithecus sediba
Barrancatatus	Valid	Carlini; Ciancio; Scillato-Yané	Early Oligocene		Argentina; Chile	An armadillo. The type species is "Meteutatus" rigidus Ameghino (1902); genus also includes "Meteutatus" tinguiririquensis Carlini et al. (2009), as well as new species Barrancatatus maddeni.	
Basirepomys	Valid	Kortha; De Blieux	Late Hemphillian (Late Miocene)	Sevier River Formation	USA	Species: B. pliocenicus (previously Peromyscus pliocenicus Wilson 1937) (type); B. robertsi	
Batodonoides walshi	Valid	Kelly	Middle Eocene	Sespe Formation	United States	A shrew-like mammal, a species of Batodonoides.	
Blacktops	Valid	Meehan; Martin	Early Oligocene	Brule Formation	United States	A member of Leptictida. The type species is B. longinares; genus also includes B. latidens.	
Bos buiaensis	Valid	Martínez-Navarro et al.	Early Pleistocene		Eritrea	A member of Bovidae, species of Bos.	
Chasicotatus powelli	Valid	Scillato–Yané, Krmpotic & Esteban	Late Miocene (Huayquerian)		Argentina	A euphractine armadillo related to Eutatus, a species of Chasicotatus.	
Chasicotatus spinozai	Valid	Scillato–Yané, Krmpotic & Esteban	Late Miocene (Huayquerian)		Argentina	A euphractine armadillo related to Eutatus, a species of Chasicotatus.	
Chrysochloris arenosa	Valid	Asher; Avery	Early Pliocene	Langebaanweg locality	South Africa	A golden mole, a species of Chrysochloris.	
Chrysochloris bronneri	Valid	Asher; Avery	Early Pliocene	Langebaanweg locality	South Africa	A golden mole, a species of Chrysochloris.	
Chubutomys leucoreios	Valid	Pérez; Vucetich; Kramarz	Miocene (Colhuehuapian)		Argentina	A rodent belonging to the family Eocardiidae.	
"Cricetodon" fandli	Valid	Prieto, Böhme & Gross	Miocene		Austria	A rodent.	
Cricetodon wanhei	Valid	Qiu Zhu-Ding	Early Miocene	Xiacaowan Formation	China	A cricetodontine cricetid.	
Ctenomys uquiensis	Valid	Verzi; Olivares; Morgan	Late Pliocene	Uquía Formation	Argentina	A tuco-tuco.	
Damalborea	Valid	Gentry	Middle Pliocene	Hadar Formation	Ethiopia	An alcelaphine bovid. Its type species is Damalborea elisabethae.	
Darocasorex	Valid	van Dam	Miocene		Spain	An anourosoricini soricidae. The type species is D. vandermeuleni.	
Dawsonicyon	Valid	Spaulding; Flynn; Stucky	Middle Eocene	Bridger Formation	USA	A basal carnivoramorphan.	
Deccanolestes narmadensis	Valid	Prasad et al.	Late Cretaceous (Maastrichtian)	Deccan Intertrappean Beds	India		
Democricetodon suensis	Valid	Qiu Zhu-Ding	Early Miocene	Xiacaowan Formation	China	A copemyine cricetid.	
Dendropithecus ugandensis	Valid	Pickford et al.	Early Miocene		Uganda		
Desmanodon crocheti	Valid	Prieto	Miocene		Germany	A member of Talpidae.	
Desmanodon fluegeli	Valid	Prieto et al.	Miocene		Austria	A member of Talpidae.	
Diabolocornis	Valid	Beatty	Early Miocene		United States	An aletomerycine palaeomerycid. The type species is D. simonsi.	
Diacodexis morrisi	Valid	Hooker	Early Eocene	Blackheath Formation	United Kingdom		
Diacodexis parvus	Valid	Kumar et al.	Eocene (Ypresian)	Cambay Formation	India		
Didolodus magnus	Valid	Gelfo	Eocene		Argentina		
Dimaitherium	Valid	Barrow; Seiffert; Simons	early Late Eocene (early Priabonian)	Birket Qarun Formation	Egypt	A hyracoid. The type species is D. patnaiki.	
Dilambdogale	Valid	Seiffert	Earliest Priabonian	Birket Qarun Formation	Egypt	The oldest known afrosoricid.	
Diplothrix yangziensis	Valid	Wang; Jin; Wei	Early Pleistocene		China	A relative of the Ryukyu long-tailed giant rat.	
Diunatans	Valid	Bosselaers; Post	Early Pliocene (Zanclean)	Kattendijk Formation	Netherlands; South Africa	A small rorqual	
Dolosimus	Valid	Dawson; Li; Qi	Eocene (Irdinmanhan)		China	A rodent of uncertain phylogenetic placement. The type species is D. dolus.	
Draconomys	Valid	Vucetich et al.	Early Oligocene		Argentina	An octodontoid rodent of uncertain phylogenetic placement. The type species is D. verai.	
Edworthia	Valid	Fox; Scott; Rankin	Middle Torrejonian	Paskapoo Formation	Canada	A primitive paromomyid plesiadapiform.	
Erlianomys	Valid	Li Qian; Meng Jin	Early Eocene	Arshanto Formation	China	A primitive myodont rodent. The species is E. combinatus.	
Eudaemonema webbi	Valid	Scott	Late Paleocene		Canada	A member of Mixodectidae.	
Faraframys	Valid	Mein; Pickford	Vallesian		Egypt	A rodent related to the maned rat. The type species is F. heissigi.	
Frontanyamys	Valid	Quer; Agustí	Eocene		Spain	A rodent belonging to the family Remyidae. The type species is F. russelli.	
Gaudeamus lavocati	Valid	Coster et al.	Early Oligocene		Libya	A rodent belonging to the group Hystricognathi.	
Geringia copiosus	Valid	Korth	Late Oligocene		United States	A cricetid rodent, a species of Geringia.	
Gracilocyon	Valid	Smith; Smith	earliest Eocene		Belgium USA	A miacid carnivoran.	
Guiomys	Valid	Pérez	Middle Miocene		Argentina	A primitive cavioid rodent.	
Hapalodectes paleocenus	Valid	Beard et al.	Late Paleocene	Nomogen Formation	China		
Helanshania	Valid	Vianey-Liaud; Rodrigues; Marivaux	Oligocene		China	A gundi. The type species is H. deserta.	
Henricofilholia vucetichia	Valid	Ribeiro; López; Bond	Oligocene	Sarmiento Formation	Argentina	A leontiniid notoungulate.	
Homo gautengensis	Valid	Curnoe	Pleistocene	Cradle of Humankind	South Africa	Identification of H. gautengensis was based on partial skulls, several jaws, teeth and other bones found at various times at the Caves. It emerged over 2 million years ago and died out approximately 600,000 years ago, and is believed to have arisen earlier than Homo habilis.	
Hypolagus balearicus	Valid	Quintana et al.	Early Pliocene		Spain	A member of Leporidae belonging to the subfamily Archaeolaginae.	
Iriripithecus	Valid	Pickford et al.	Early Miocene		Uganda	An early catarrhine of uncertain affinity. The type species is I. alekileki.	
Joumocetus	Valid	Kimura; Hasegawa	earliest Late Miocene	Haraichi Formation	Japan	A cetotheriid whale. The type species is J. shimizui.	
Kabirmys	Valid	Sallam; Seiffert; et al. (Note: Sallam, Seiffert, Simons, Brindley.)	earliest late Eocene	Birket Qarun Formation	Egypt	An anomaluroid rodent.	
Karamojapithecus	Valid	Pickford et al.	Early Miocene		Uganda	An early catarrhine of uncertain affinity. The type species is K. akisimia.	
Karanisia arenula	Valid	Jaeger et al.	Eocene		Libya		
Komba walkeri	Valid	Harrison	Early Miocene		Kenya	A galago.	
Kutchisiren	Valid	Bajpai; Domning; et al. (Note: Bajpai, Domning, Das, Velez-Juarbe, Mishra.)	Miocene	Khari Nadi Formation	India	A new name for Kotadasiren gracilis Das & Basu, 1994 (nomen nudum). The type species is Kutchisiren cylindrica.	
Leidymys juxtaparvulus	Valid	Korth	Late Oligocene		United States	A cricetid rodent, a species of Leidymys.	
Lestobradys	Valid	Rinderknechta; Bostelmann; et al. (Note: Rinderknechta, Bostelmann, Pereab, Lecuona.)	Late Miocene (Huayquerian)	Camacho Formation	Uruguay	A mylodontid. The type species is L. sprechmanni.	
Livyatan	Valid	Lambert; Bianucci; et al. (Note: Lambert, Bianucci, Post, de Muizon, Salas-Gismondi, Urbina, Reumer.)	Miocene	Pisco Formation	Peru	A physeteroid whale. The type species is L. melvillei.	Livyatan
Lokotunjailurus fanonei	Valid	De Bonis et al.	Late Miocene		Chad	A saber-toothed cat.	
Luantus minor	Valid	Pérez; Vucetich; Kramarz	Miocene (Colhuehuapian)		Argentina	A rodent belonging to the family Eocardiidae.	
Lycaon sekowei	Valid	Hartstone-Rose et al.	Pliocene to Pleistocene		South Africa	A relative of the African wild dog.	
Marisela	Valid	Vucetich et al.	Pliocene	San Gregorio Formation	Venezuela	An octodontoid rodent. The type species is M. gregoriana.	
Mazateronodon	Valid	Marigó, Minwer-Barakat & Moyà-Solà	Middle Eocene		Spain	A notharctid adapiform. The type species is Mazateronodon endemicus.	
Mazzonicebus	Valid	Kay	Early Miocene	Sarmiento Formation	Argentina	A New World monkey related to Homunculus patagonicus and members of the genus Soriacebus. The type species is M. almendrae.	
Mazzoniphractus	Valid	Carlini; Ciancio; Scillato-Yané	Late Eocene	Sarmiento Formation	Argentina	An armadillo. The type species is M. ingens.	
Mendozahippus	Valid	Cerdeño; Vera	Late Oligocene	Agua de la Piedra Formation	Argentina	A notohippid notoungulate.	
Metaliomys	Valid	Kortha; De Blieux	Late Hemphillian (Late Miocene)	Sevier River Formation	USA	Species: Metaliomys sevierensis	
Miacis rundlei	Valid	Hooker	Early Eocene	Blackheath Formation	United Kingdom	Originally described as a species of Miacis, subsequently transferred to the genus Gracilocyon.	
Miocyon vallisrubrae	Valid	Friscia; Rassmussen	Middle Eocene	Uinta Formation	USA		
Mormopterus barrancae	Valid	Czaplewski	Colhuehuapian		Argentina	A free-tailed bat, a species of Mormopterus.	
Myotragus palomboi	Valid	Bover; Quintana; Alcover	Early Pliocene		Spain	A member of Caprinae.	
Neomatronella gassoni	Valid	Hooker	Early Eocene	Blackheath Formation	United Kingdom	A member of Erinaceomorpha belonging to the family Amphilemuridae.	
Nosmips	Valid	Seiffert et al.	Eocene (Priabonian)	Birket Qarun Formation	Egypt	A primate of uncertain phylogenetic placement. The type species is N. aenigmaticus.	
Notiosorex dalquesti	Valid	Carraway	Late Pleistocene to Holocene		Mexico; United States	A shrew, a species of Notiosorex.	
Notiosorex harrisi	Valid	Carraway	Late Miocene to Holocene		Mexico; United States	A shrew, a species of Notiosorex.	
Nyctereutes lockwoodi	Valid	Geraads et al.	Middle Pliocene		Ethiopia	A species of Nyctereutes (a relative of the raccoon dog).	
Ochotona kormosi	Valid	Fostowicz-Frelik; Frelik; Gasparik	Pleistocene		Hungary	A pika.	
Omoiosicista	Valid	Kimura	Early Miocene		China	A dipodid rodent.	
Orelladjidaumo amplus	Valid	Korth	Late Oligocene		United States	An eomyid rodent, a species of Orelladjidaumo.	
Paciculus dakotensis	Valid	Korth	Late Oligocene		United States	A cricetid rodent, a species of Paciculus.	
Palaeonictis wingi	Valid	Chester et al.	Eocene (Wasatchian)	Lower Willwood Formation	United States		
Patagonhippus	Valid	López; Ribeiro; Bond	Oligocene		Argentina	A notohippid notoungulate. The type species is P. canterensis; genus also includes P. dukei.	
Phiomys hammudai	Valid	Jaeger et al.	Eocene		Libya	A rodent belonging to the family Phiomyidae.	
Plesiobalaenoptera	Valid	Bisconti	Late Miocene (Tortonian)	Sediments of the Stirone River	Italy	A parabalaenopterine balaenopterid. The type species is P. quarantellii.	
Platalearostrum	Valid	Post; Kompanje	early or middle Pleistocene		the Netherlands	A prehistoric pilot whale (Family Delphinidae). The type species is P. hoekmani	
Pliolophus barnesi	Valid	Hooker	Early Eocene	Blackheath Formation	United Kingdom		
Presbytherium	Valid	Scott	Paleocene	Paskapoo Formation	Canada	A cyriacotheriid pantodont. Species: P. rhodorugatus; P. taurus	
Primus pusillus	Valid	Qiu Zhu-Ding	Early Miocene	Xiacaowan Formation	China	A copemyine cricetid.	
Prolagus osmolskae	Valid	Fostowicz-Frelik	Pliocene		Poland	A member of Lagomorpha, a species of Prolagus.	
Protophiomys durattalahensis	Valid	Jaeger et al.	Eocene		Libya	A rodent belonging to the family Phiomyidae.	
Pseudoloris pyrenaicus	Valid	Minwer-Barakat; Marigó; Moyà-Solà	Eocene		Spain	A primate belonging to the family Omomyidae.	
Qatranilestes	Valid	Seiffert	Rupelian	Jebel Qatrani Formation	Egypt	The youngest known afrosoricid.	
Rusingaceros	Valid	Geraads	Miocene		Kenya	A rhinoceros, a new genus for "Dicerorhinus" leakeyi (Hooijer, 1966).	
Saadanius	Valid	Zalmout; Sanders; et al. (Note: Zalmout, Sanders, MacLatchy, Gunnell, Al-Mufarreh, Ali, Nasser, Al-Masari, Al-Sobhi, Nadhra, Matari, Wilson, Gingerich.)	Oligocene	Shumaysi Formation	Saudi Arabia	A catarrhine primate. The species was named S. hijazensis.	Saadanius
Sadypus minutus	Valid	Carlini; Ciancio; Scillato-Yané	Early Oligocene	Sarmiento Formation	Argentina	An armadillo, a species of Sadypus.	
Saharamys	Valid	Mein; Pickford	Vallesian		Egypt	A murid rodent belonging to the subfamily Murinae. The type species is S. misrensis.	
Scarrittia barranquensis	Valid	Ribeiro; López; Bond	Oligocene	Sarmiento Formation	Argentina	A leontiniid notoungulate.	
Shazurus	Valid	Sallam; Seiffert; Simons	Late Eocene		Egypt	An anomalure. The type species is S. minutus.	
Simiolus andrewsi	Valid	Harrison	Middle Miocene		Kenya	A dendropithecid.	
Sinocricetus major	Valid	Li	Pliocene		China	A hamster.	
Sinodonomys	Valid	Kimura	Early Miocene		China	A dipodid rodent.	
Sparnacomys georgei	Valid	Hooker	Early Eocene	Blackheath Formation	United Kingdom	A rodent belonging to the family Paramyidae and the subfamily Microparamyinae.	
Steatomys bartheli	Valid	Mein; Pickford	Vallesian		Egypt	A rodent, a species of Steatomys.	
Talahphiomys	Valid	Jaeger et al.	Eocene to early Oligocene		Egypt; Libya	A rodent belonging to the family Phiomyidae. The type species is "Phiomys" lavocati Wood (1968); genus also includes new species T. libycus.	
Talahpithecus	Valid	Jaeger et al.	Eocene		Libya	A member of Oligopithecidae. The type species is T. parvus.	
Tapirus lundeliusi	Valid	Hulbert	Early Pleistocene		United States	A tapir.	
Turkanapithecus rusingensis	Valid	Pickford et al.	Early Miocene		Kenya; Uganda		
Vallehermosomys	Valid	Vucetich et al.	Early Oligocene		Argentina	An octodontoid rodent of uncertain phylogenetic placement. The type species is V. mazzonii; genus might also include Vallehermosomys? merlinae.	
Viverravus lawsoni	Valid	Hooker	Early Eocene	Blackheath Formation	United Kingdom	A member of Viverravidae.	
Yuanomys	Valid	Meng; Li	Early Eocene	Nomogen Formation	China	A rodent related to the gundis. The type species is Y. zhoui.	
