= Matanomictis =

Matanomictis Temporal range: Aquitanian–Burdigalian

Scientific classification
- Kingdom: Animalia
- Phylum: Chordata
- Class: Mammalia
- Order: Carnivora
- Family: Mustelidae
- Genus: †Matanomictis; Thewissen & Bajpai, 2008
- Species: †M. maniyarensis

Binomial name
- †Matanomictis maniyarensis Thewissen & Bajpai, 2008

Extinct genus of mustelid

Matanomictis (lit. 'Matanomadh marten') is an extinct genus of mustelid that is known from Early Miocene of Khari Nadi Formation, India. The genus contains a single species, Matanomictis maniyarensis. It is currently the oldest known mustelid from Indian Subcontinent.

== Discovery and naming ==
The holotype of Matanomictis, IITR-SB 5135, a right mandible with p4 and m1, was discovered 1km south of the Mata no Madh village, the remains of dugongids like Bharatisiren indica are also known from the type locality.

In 2008, Thewissen and Bajpai described the mandible as a new genus and species of mustelid, Matanomictis maniyarensis. The generic name "Matanomictis" is a combination of two words, "Matanom" after the Matanomadh village, which is located 1km north of the type locality, and "ictis" is the Greek word for martens. The specific name "maniyarensis" is after the Maniyara Fort Formation, the geological formation to which the type locality was originally considered a part of.

== Description ==
Matanomictis is designated as the oldest known mustelid from Indian subcontinent and one of the oldest known mustelid in Eurasia. It was a small sized mustelid, with its m1 dimensions of 6.6 x 3.0 mm. It is also suggested that Matanomictis had a Otter-like lifestyle as the depositional environment in which the holotype was found was clearly near-shore marine.

== Classification ==
Matanomictis can be distinguished from other early carnivorans like amphicyonids like Pseudocyonopsis and Cynelos as both of these are larger, lack a diastema between p4 & m1 and have larger carnassial talonids, and early ursids like Pachycynodon as they are bunodont and have lower carnassial talonids compared to Matanomictis.

Matanomictis can be confidently assigned to mustelids as its lower carnassial has a wide, long trigonid with a high protoconid, the m1 trigonid being only slightly longer than talnoid, a large hypoconid on a rounded talonid, and a diastema between the p4 and m1 teeth. Notably, the carnassial trigonid is lower and broader compared to Palaeogale, which was originally thought to be a mustelid but is now considered as a indeterminate carnivoran. However, it lacks the specialized features of any mustelid subfamily; for instance, it has a low carnassial as seen in lutrines, but absence of crowding of the premolars(both of which are diagnostic of lutrine subfamily), has a secondary cusp in last premolar as seen in melines, it lacks a high trigonid with a small metaconid and a short talonid but has anterior position of the metaconid, further distinguishing Matanomictis from other mustelids.

== Paleoecology ==
Matanomictis is known from Khari Nadi Formation, which is a diverse Early Miocene geological formation that has reports of numerous sirenians like Kharisiren, Bharatisiren, Kutchisiren and Domningia, crocodylians like Rhamphosuchus, as well as numerous sharks and ungulates.
