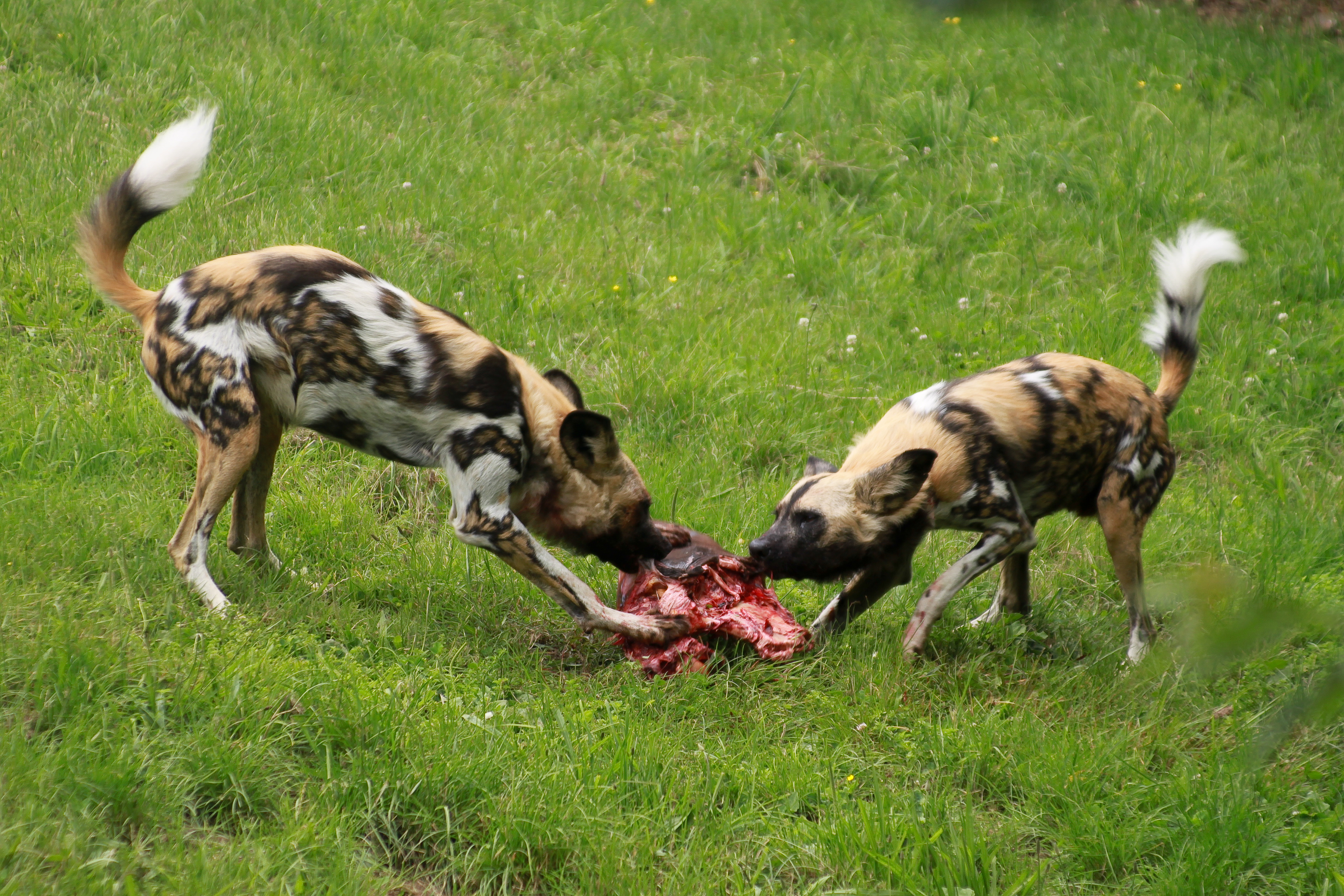
- African wild dogs

Scientific classification
- Kingdom: Animalia
- Phylum: Chordata
- Class: Mammalia
- Order: Carnivora
- Family: Canidae
- Subfamily: Caninae
- Tribe: Canini
- Genus: Lycaon; Brookes, 1827

Species
- L. pictus Temminck 1820; †L. magnus Ewer and Singer, 1956; †L. sekowei Hartstone-Rose et al., 2010

= Lycaon (genus) =

Lycaon Temporal range: 2–0 Ma Early Pleistocene – present

Genus of carnivores

Lycaon is a genus of canid which includes the African wild dog (Lycaon pictus) and the extinct species Lycaon sekowei and Lycaon magnus.

== Taxonomy ==
This hypercarnivorous and highly cursorial genus is distinguished by accessory cusps on the premolars. It branched from the wolflike canids lineage during the Plio-Pleistocene. Since then, Lycaon has become lighter and tetradactyl, but has remained hypercarnivorous. Lycaon sekowei is known from the early Pleistocene epoch of South Africa and was less cursorial.

Some researchers consider the extinct Canis subgenus Xenocyon as ancestral to both Lycaon and Cuon.

Other researchers propose that the extinct Canis (Xenocyon) falconeri and Canis (Xenocyon) lycaonoides should be classified under genus Lycaon, to give the descent of three chronospecies: L. falconeri in the Late Pliocene of Eurasia → L. lycaonoides in the Early Pleistocene and the beginning of the Middle Pleistocene of Eurasia and Africa → L. pictus in the Middle–Late Pleistocene and today the extant African descendant.

== See also ==
- Lycaon of Arcadia, a figure from Greek mythology who was transformed into a wolf
