= Harnas Wildlife Foundation =

Namibian organization

Coordinates: 21.722467°S 19.349706°E

Harnas Wildlife Foundation is an organization located in Namibia, approximately 300 km east of the capital Windhoek. Harnas is one of the few wildlife orphanages and medical centers in the world to take in abused, injured, and captured wild animals from Namibia, Botswana, and southern African nations, saving hundreds of animals per year. Its mission is to protect life; done through the responsible and effective management, regulation and understanding of the resources necessary for this task.

== History ==
Harnas Wildlife Foundation has been on the forefront of nature conservation and wildlife tourism for over 34 years. The farm was originally fenced as a cattle farm and acted as such as main source of income for its residents until fairly recently. It all started in 1978 when Nick and Marieta van der Merwe saved an abused vervet monkey from its captors for five Rand and some bread.

This monkey was the beginning of a long line of animals that found refuge at their farm, Harnas. Shortly thereafter a zoo in South Africa went defunct and its lions were given into the care of the Van der Merwe family. To cover the ever-increasing costs of food, new enclosures and medical treatment, all of which the family had financed until then through profits from their cattle, Harnas opened its doors to visitors and contributors.

This wildlife refuge became a reality, and over the years expanded to become a major role player in conservation and wildlife campaigns. The site now comprises enclosures, voluntary headquarters, safari tours, guest farm and a huge surrounding conservation land around the main hub. Once fit and able to leave the main enclosures, the previously injured and traumatized animals are set free in this wilderness, to roam as they would in their natural habitat.

== Locations ==
Harnas Wildlife Foundation currently operates from Gobabis area.

Harnas Gobabis

Harnas Gobabis is the main contact point between man and animal. The original farm and location for all operations and projects like the animal clinic, Cheeky Cheetah Day-care centre, adult literacy project, a running lodge, lapa and various research stations. There are various animal enclosures, free roaming game camps and grazing camps for domesticated animals such as cattle and goats. The farm is roughly 10 000 hectares big and situated in the central Kalahari, a region that is mostly flat savannah locally known as sand-veld.

== Animals ==
There are many types of animals that take refuge at Harnas and a population of feral animals on site.

This overview is only one indication of the diversity of animals at Harnas Wildlife Foundation and is not a complete list.

- lion
- cheetah
- leopard
- caracal
- eagles
- meerkat
- mongoose
- zebra
- baboon
- African wild dog
- springbok
- impala
- oribi
- crocodile
- ostrich
- helmeted guineafowl

== Harnas Lifeline Project ==
This is the primary "soft release" area, also used to gather vital information on semi-wild animals, in a natural environment.

== Adult literacy program ==
At Harnas Wildlife Foundation, 90% of the employees are people from the San community and through the years we have realized that it is not only the animals that needs to be taken care of. We have established an adult literacy program to teach members of the San community basic useful life and job skills so that no matter where they may migrate to, they are educated to take care of themselves. The program is open to any member of the community and lasts around 6 months. Woman learn skills in arts and crafts, jewellery making, housework and needlework and men are equipped with knowledge of welding, building and woodwork. Upon completion each member receives a certificate showing their ability in the specific training area and stating their completion of the course.

== Cheeky Cheetah Kids Project ==
When the Van Der Merwe family were looking for schools for their own children, they realized that they had the ability to provide the basic education and general skills for not only their own, but for many of the San people that they employ. The Cheeky Cheetah day care center was established to provide the children day care with the necessary education, food and to equip them with the basic knowledge to, when they reach the right age, be able to adapt and attend a primary school. After 5 years the school consists of a fully furnished school with of one big classroom, showers, toilets, and an outdoor play area. Children are further helped by being placed in public schools where they are continuously supported through financial support; paying of school, hostel and other fees, as well as clothing, food and other needs.

== International patronage ==
The international patron of Harnas Wildlife Foundation is Angelina Jolie.
