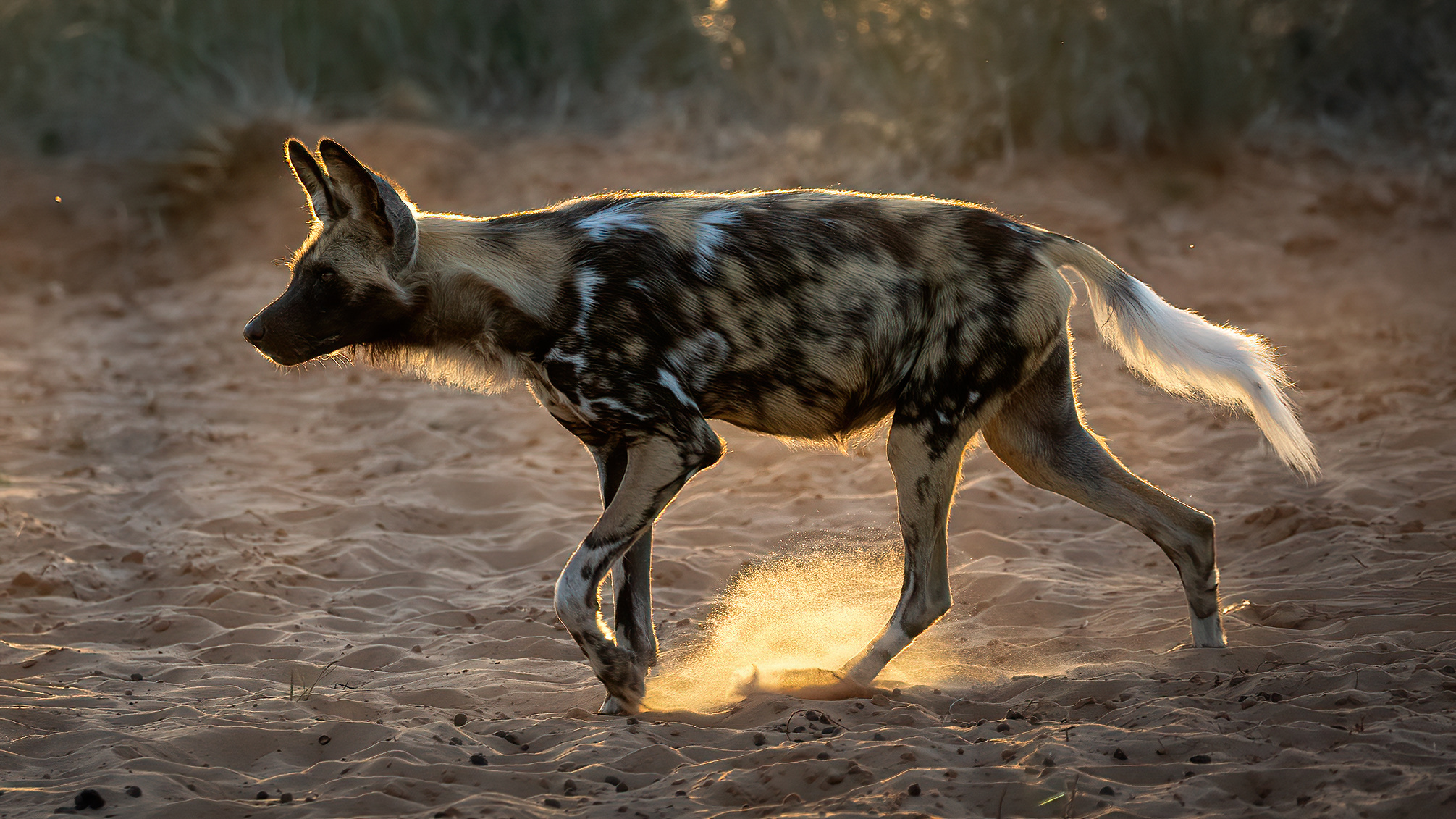
- African wild dog in South Africa

Conservation status
- Endangered (IUCN 3.1)

Scientific classification
- Kingdom: Animalia
- Phylum: Chordata
- Class: Mammalia
- Order: Carnivora
- Family: Canidae
- Subfamily: Caninae
- Tribe: Canini
- Genus: Lycaon
- Species: L. pictus

Binomial name
- Lycaon pictus (Temminck, 1820)
- African wild dog range according to the IUCN Red List Extant (resident) Probably extant (resident)

= African wild dog =

African wild dog Temporal range: Middle Pleistocene – present (200,000–0 years BP)

Species of canine

The African wild dog (Lycaon pictus), also called painted dog and Cape hunting dog, is a wild canine native to sub-Saharan Africa. It is the largest wild canine in Africa and the only extant member of the genus Lycaon, which is distinguished from Canis by dentition highly specialised for a hypercarnivorous diet and by a lack of dewclaws.

An estimated 6,600 adults (including 1,400 mature individuals) live in 39 subpopulations, all threatened by habitat fragmentation, human persecution, and outbreaks of disease. As the largest subpopulation probably consists of fewer than 250 individuals, the African wild dog has been listed as endangered on the IUCN Red List since 1990.

The African wild dog is a specialized hunter of terrestrial ungulates, mostly hunting at dawn and dusk, but it also displays diurnal activity. It captures its prey by using stamina and cooperative hunting to exhaust them. Its natural competitors are lions and spotted hyenas; the former kill the dogs where possible, whilst the latter are frequent kleptoparasites. Like other canids, the African wild dog regurgitates food for its young, but also extends this action to adults as a central part of the pack's social unit. The young have the privilege of feeding first on carcasses.

The African wild dog has been revered in several hunter-gatherer societies, particularly those of the San people and prehistoric Egypt.

== Etymology and naming ==
The English language has several names for the African wild dog, including African hunting dog, Cape hunting dog, painted hunting dog, painted dog, painted wolf, and painted lycaon. Though the name African wild dog is widely used, "wild dog" is thought by conservation groups to have negative connotations that could be detrimental to its image; one organisation promotes the name "painted wolf", whilst the name "painted dog" has been found to be the most likely to counteract negative perceptions.

== Taxonomic and evolutionary history ==
=== Taxonomy ===
Phylogenetic tree of the wolf-like canids with timing in millions of years (Note: For a full set of supporting references refer to the note (a) in the phylotree at Evolution of the wolf#Wolf-like canids)

- Caninae 3.5 Ma
  - 3.0
    - 2.5
      - 2.0
        - 0.96
          - 0.6
            - 0.38
              - - - Domestic dog
                  - Wolf
              - Coyote
            - African wolf
          - Golden jackal
        - Ethiopian wolf
      - Dhole
    - African wild dog
  - - 2.6
      - Side-striped jackal
      - Black-backed jackal

The earliest written reference for the species appears to be from Oppian, who wrote of the thoa, a hybrid between the wolf and leopard, which resembles the former in shape and the latter in colour. Solinus's Collectanea rerum memorabilium from the third century AD describes a multicoloured, wolf-like animal with a mane native to Ethiopia.

The African wild dog was scientifically described in 1820 by Coenraad Jacob Temminck after having examined a specimen from the coast of Mozambique, which he named Hyaena picta. It was later recognised as a canid by Joshua Brookes in 1827 and renamed Lycaon tricolor. The root word of Lycaon is the Greek λυκαίος (lykaios), meaning wolf-like. The specific epithet pictus (Latin for painted), which derived from the original picta, was later returned to it, in conformity with the International Rules on Taxonomic Nomenclature.

Paleontologist George G. Simpson placed the African wild dog, the dhole, and the bush dog together in the subfamily Simocyoninae on the basis of all three species having similarly trenchant carnassials. This grouping was disputed by Juliet Clutton-Brock, who argued that other than dentition, too many differences exist among the three species to warrant classifying them in a single subfamily.

=== Evolution ===
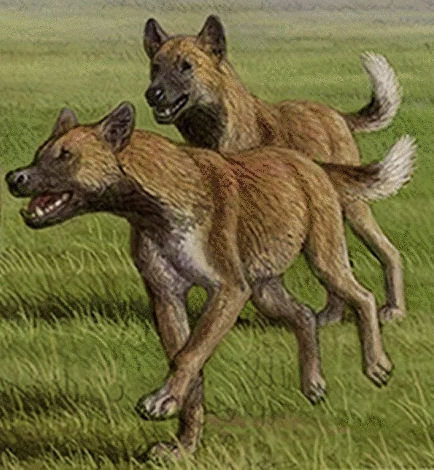
Artistic reconstruction by Mauricio Antón of Xenocyon, a possible ancestral genus

The African wild dog possesses the most specialized adaptations among the canids for coat colour and diet and for pursuing its prey through its cursorial (running) ability. It has a graceful skeleton, and the loss of the first digit on its forefeet increases its stride and speed. This adaptation allows it to pursue prey across open terrain for long distances. The teeth are generally carnassial-shaped, and its premolars are the largest relative to body size of any living carnivoran with the exception of the spotted hyena. On the lower carnassials (first lower molars), the talonid has evolved to become a cutting blade for flesh slicing, with a reduction or loss of the postcarnassial molars. This adaptation also occurs in the two other hypercarnivorous canids – the dhole and the bush dog. The African wild dog exhibits some of the most varied coat colours among mammals. Individuals differ in patterns and colours, indicating a diversity of the underlying genes. The purpose of these coat patterns may be an adaptation for communication, concealment, or temperature regulation. A 2019 study indicated that the lycaon lineage diverged from Cuon and Canis 1.7 million years ago through this suite of adaptations, and these occurred at the same time as large ungulates (its prey) diversified. The findings also suggest that the African wild dog is largely isolated from gene transfer with other canid species.

The oldest African wild dog fossil dates back to 200,000 years ago and was found in HaYonim Cave, Israel. The evolution of the African wild dog is poorly understood owing to the scarcity of fossil finds. Some authors consider the extinct Canis subgenus Xenocyon as ancestral to both the genus Lycaon and the genus Cuon, which lived throughout Eurasia and Africa from the Early Pleistocene to the early Middle Pleistocene. Others propose that Xenocyon should be reclassified as Lycaon. The species Canis (Xenocyon) falconeri shared the African wild dog's absent first metacarpal (dewclaw), though its dentition was still relatively unspecialised. This connection was rejected by one author because C. (X.) falconeri's lack of the first metacarpal is a poor indication of phylogenetic closeness to the African wild dog, and the dentition was too different to imply ancestry.

Subsequent studies on the canid genome revealed that the dhole and African wild dog are closely related to members of the genus Canis and that Canis etruscus (the Etruscan wolf) and Canis mosbachensis, ancestors of the grey wolf, are also ancestors of dholes and African wild dogs.

Another ancestral candidate is the Plio-Pleistocene Lycaon sekowei of South Africa on the basis of distinct accessory cusps on its premolars and anterior accessory cuspids on its lower premolars. These adaptions are found only in Lycaon among living canids, which shows the same adaptations to a hypercarnivorous diet. L. sekowei had not yet lost the first metacarpal absent in L. pictus and was more robust than the modern species, having 10% larger teeth.

=== Admixture with the dhole ===
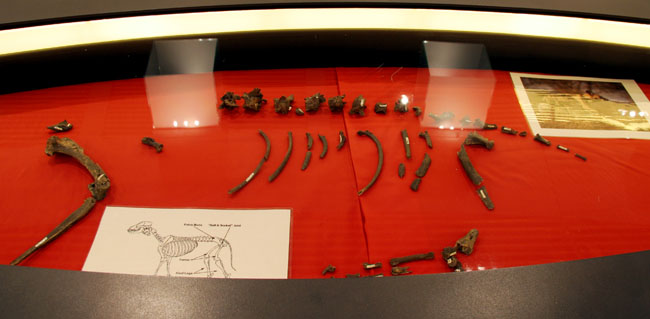
Fossil of Lycaon sekowei, a possible ancestor of the modern African wild dog

The African wild dog has 78 chromosomes, the same number as those of species in the genus Canis. In 2018 whole genome sequencing was used to compare the dhole (Cuon alpinus) with the African wild dog. Strong evidence was found of ancient genetic admixture between the two species. Today, their ranges are remote from each other, but during the Pleistocene era, the dhole could be found as far west as Europe. The study proposes that the dhole's distribution may have once included the Middle East, from where it may have admixed with the African wild dog in North Africa. However, no evidence has been found of the dhole having existed in the Middle East or North Africa.

=== Subspecies ===
As of 2005, five subspecies are recognised by Mammal Species of the World:

Subspecies	Description	Synonyms
Cape wild dog L. p. pictus Temminck, 1820	The nominate subspecies is also the largest, weighing 20–25 kg (44–55 lb). It is much more colourful than the East African wild dog, although even within this single subspecies, large geographic variations in coat colour occur; specimens inhabiting the Cape are characterised by the large amount of orange-yellow fur overlapping the black, the partially yellow backs of the ears, the mostly yellow underparts and a number of whitish hairs on the throat mane. Those in Mozambique are distinguished by the almost equal development of yellow and black on both the upper and underparts of the body, as well as having less white fur than the Cape form.	cacondae (Matschie, 1915), fuchsi (Matschie, 1915), gobabis (Matschie, 1915), krebsi (Matschie, 1915), lalandei (Matschie, 1915), tricolor (Brookes, 1827), typicus (A. Smith, 1833), venatica (Burchell, 1822), windhorni (Matschie, 1915), zuluensis (Thomas, 1904)
East African wild dog L. p. lupinus Thomas, 1902	This subspecies is distinguished by its very dark coat with very little yellow.	dieseneri (Matschie, 1915), gansseri (Matschie, 1915), hennigi (Matschie, 1915), huebneri (Matschie, 1915), kondoae (Matschie, 1915), lademanni (Matschie, 1915), langheldi (Matschie, 1915), prageri (Matschie, 1912), richteri (Matschie, 1915), ruwanae (Matschie, 1915), ssongaeae (Matschie, 1915), stierlingi (Matschie, 1915), styxi (Matschie, 1915), wintgensi (Matschie, 1915)
Somali wild dog L. p. somalicus Thomas, 1904	This subspecies is smaller than the East African wild dog, has shorter and coarser fur and has a weaker dentition. Its colour closely approaches that of the Cape wild dog, with the yellow parts being buff.	luchsingeri (Matschie, 1915), matschie (Matschie, 1915), rüppelli (Matschie, 1915), takanus (Matschie, 1915), zedlitzi (Matschie, 1915)
Chadian wild dog L. p. sharicus Thomas and Wroughton, 1907	Brightly coloured with very short 15 mm (0.6 in) hair. Brain case is fuller than L. p. pictus.	ebermaieri (Matschie, 1915)
West African wild dog L. p. manguensis Matschie, 1915	The West African wild dog used to be widespread from western to central Africa, from Senegal to Nigeria. Now, only two subpopulations survive, one in the Niokolo-Koba National Park of Senegal and the other in the W National Park of Benin, Burkina Faso, and Niger. It is estimated that 70 adult individuals are left in the wild.	mischlichi (Matschie, 1915)

Although the species is genetically diverse, these subspecific designations are not universally accepted. East African and Southern African wild dog populations were once thought to be genetically distinct, based on a small number of samples. More recent studies with a larger number of samples showed that extensive intermixing has occurred between East African and Southern African populations in the past. Some unique nuclear and mitochondrial alleles are found in Southern African and northeastern African populations, with a transition zone encompassing Botswana, Zimbabwe, and southeastern Tanzania between the two. The West African wild dog population may possess a unique haplotype, thus possibly constituting a truly distinct subspecies. The original Serengeti and Maasai Mara population of painted dogs is known to have possessed a unique genotype, but these genotypes may be extinct.

== Description ==
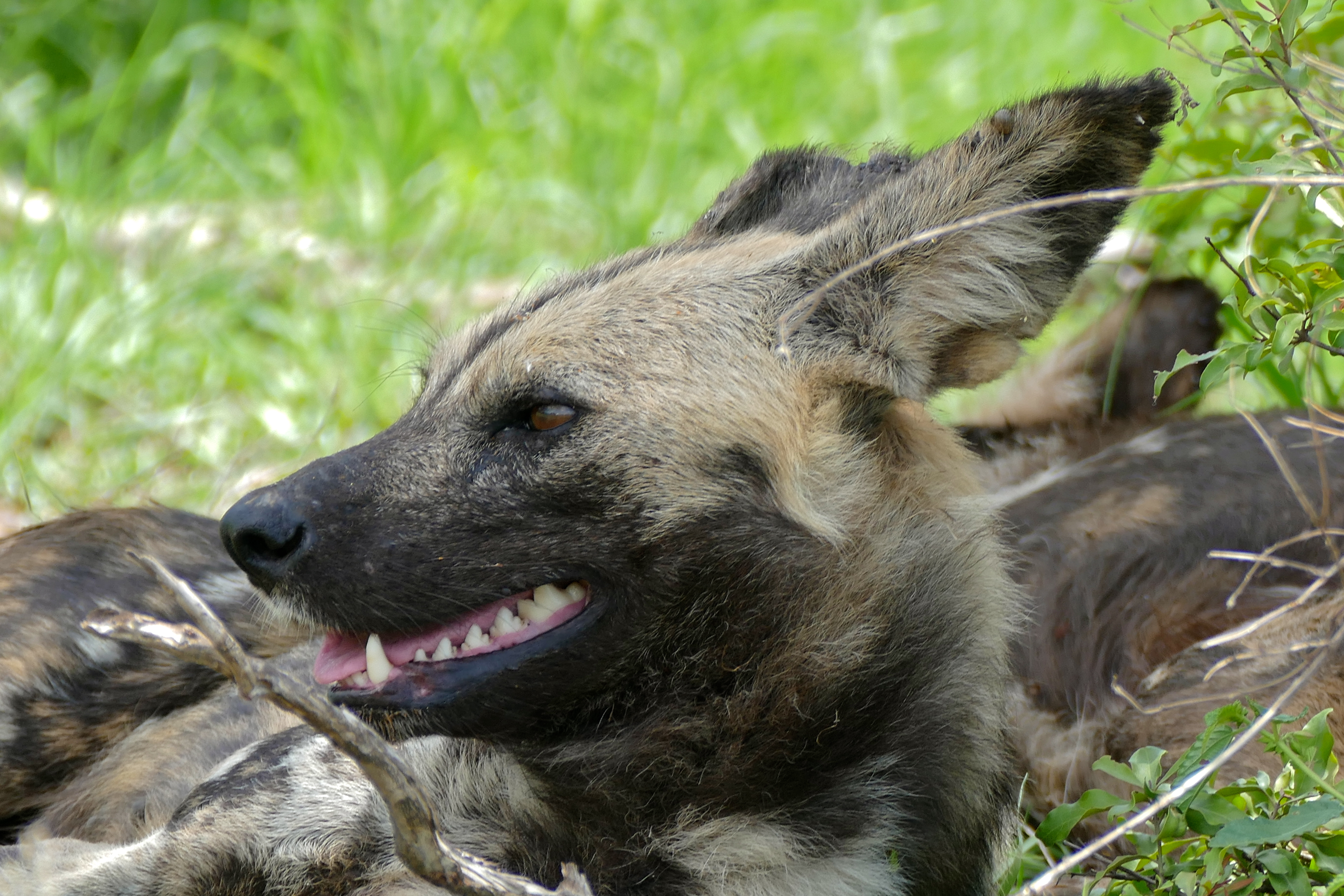
Closeup of an African wild dog in Kruger National Park

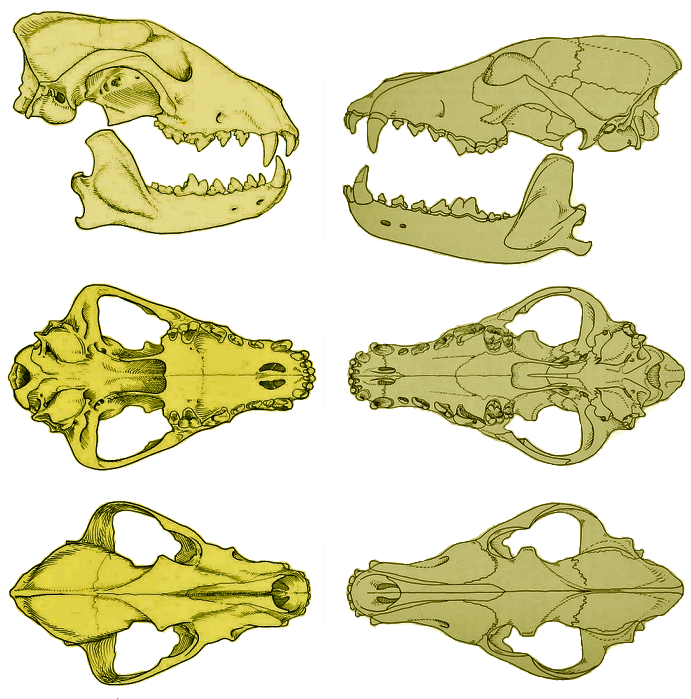
African wild dog skull (left) compared with that of the wolf (right): Note the former's shorter muzzle and fewer molars.

The African wild dog is the bulkiest and most solidly built of African canids. The species stands 60 to 75 cm (24 to 30 in) at the shoulders, measures 71 to 112 cm (28 to 44 in) in head-and-body length, and has a tail length of 29 to 41 cm (11 to 16 in). Adults have a weight range of 18 to 36 kg (40 to 79 lb). Typically, dogs from East Africa weigh around 20–25 kg (44–55 lb). By body mass, they are only outsized amongst other extant canids by the wolf species complex. Females are usually 3–7% smaller than males. Compared to members of the genus Canis, the African wild dog is comparatively lean and tall, with outsized ears and lacking dewclaws. The middle two toepads are usually fused. Its dentition presents narrow canines, and proportionately large premolars, which are the largest relative to body size of any carnivore other than hyenas. The heel of the lower carnassial M1 is crested with a single, blade-like cusp, which enhances the shearing capacity of the teeth, thus the speed at which prey can be consumed. This feature, termed "trenchant heel", is shared with two other canids, the Asian dhole and the South American bush dog. The skull is relatively shorter and broader than those of other canids.

The fur of the African wild dog differs significantly from that of other canids, consisting entirely of stiff bristle-hairs with no underfur. Colour variation is extreme, and may serve in visual identification, as African wild dogs can recognise each other at distances of 50–100 m (160–330 ft). Some geographic variation is seen in coat colour, with northeastern African specimens tending to be predominantly black with small white and yellow patches, while southern African ones are more brightly coloured, sporting a mix of brown, black, and white coats. Much of the species' coat patterning occurs on the trunk and legs. Little variation in facial markings occurs, with the muzzle being black, gradually shading into brown on the cheeks and forehead. A black line extends up the forehead, turning blackish-brown on the back of the ears. A few specimens sport a brown, teardrop-shaped mark below the eyes. The back of the head and neck are either brown or yellow. A white patch occasionally occurs behind the fore legs, with some specimens having completely white fore legs, chests, and throats. The tail is usually white at the tip, black in the middle, and brown at the base. Some specimens lack the white tip entirely or may have black fur below the white tip. These coat patterns can be asymmetrical, with each side of the body often having different markings from the other.

== Distribution and habitat ==
The African wild dog occurs foremost in Southern and East Africa. It is rare in North Africa and mostly absent in West Africa, with the only potentially viable population occurring in Senegal's Niokolo-Koba National Park. It is occasionally sighted in other parts of Senegal, Guinea, and Mali. Its distribution is patchy in East Africa. It inhabits mostly savannas and arid zones, generally avoiding forested areas. This preference is likely linked to its hunting habits, which require open areas that do not obstruct vision or impede pursuit. It travels through scrubland, woodland, and montane areas in pursuit of prey. A forest-dwelling population has been identified in the Harenna Forest, a wet montane forest up to an elevation of 2,400 m (7,900 ft) in the Bale Mountains of Ethiopia. At least one record exists of a pack being sighted on the summit of Mount Kilimanjaro. In Zimbabwe, it has been recorded at the elevation of 1,800 m (5,900 ft). In Ethiopia, several packs were sighted at elevations of 1,900 to 2,800 m (6,200 to 9,200 ft), and a dead individual was found in June 1995 at 4,050 m (13,290 ft) on the Sanetti Plateau. A stable population comprising more than 370 individuals is present in Kruger National Park.

== Behaviour and ecology ==
=== Social and reproductive behaviour ===
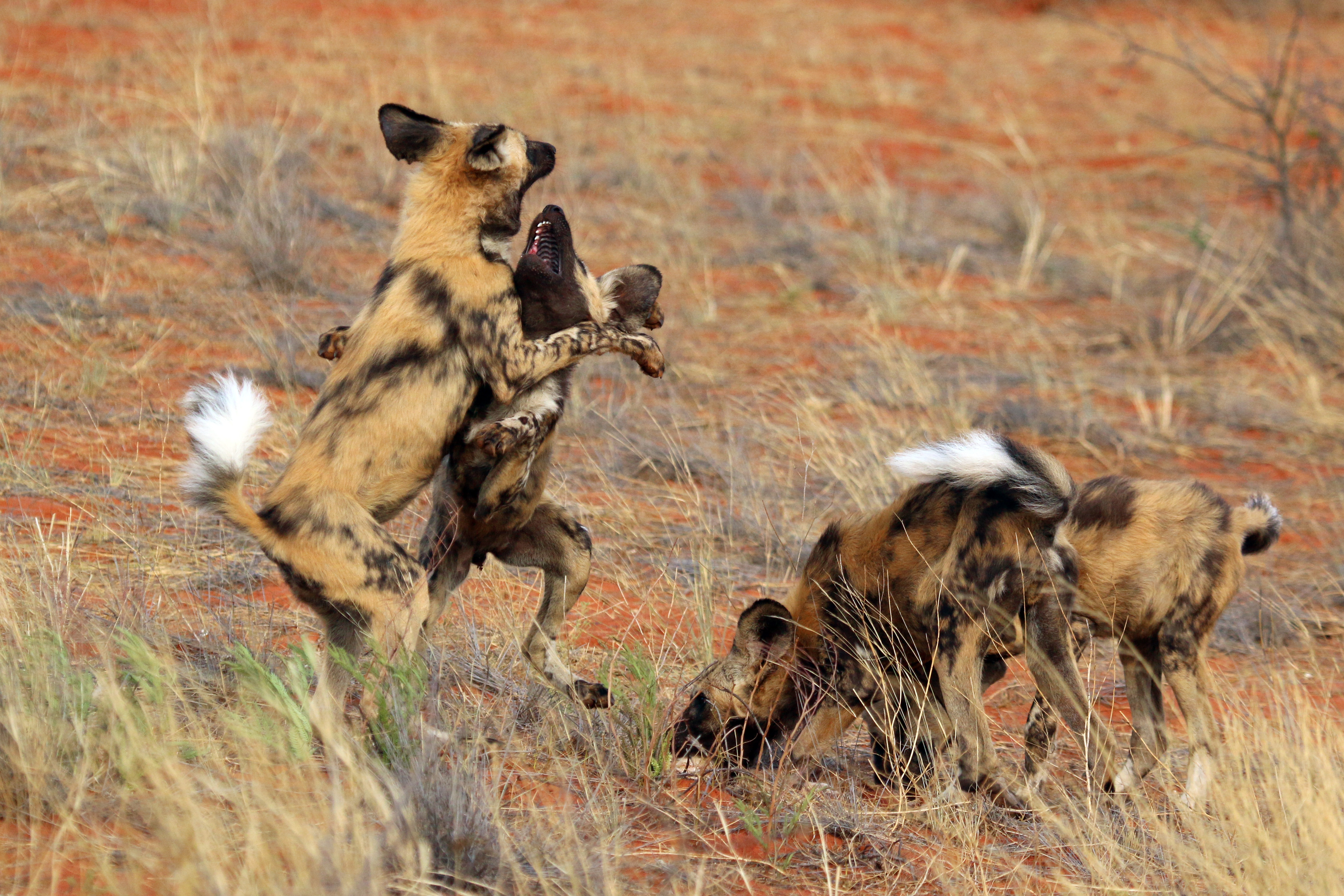
Play fighting after a kill in Tswalu Kalahari Reserve

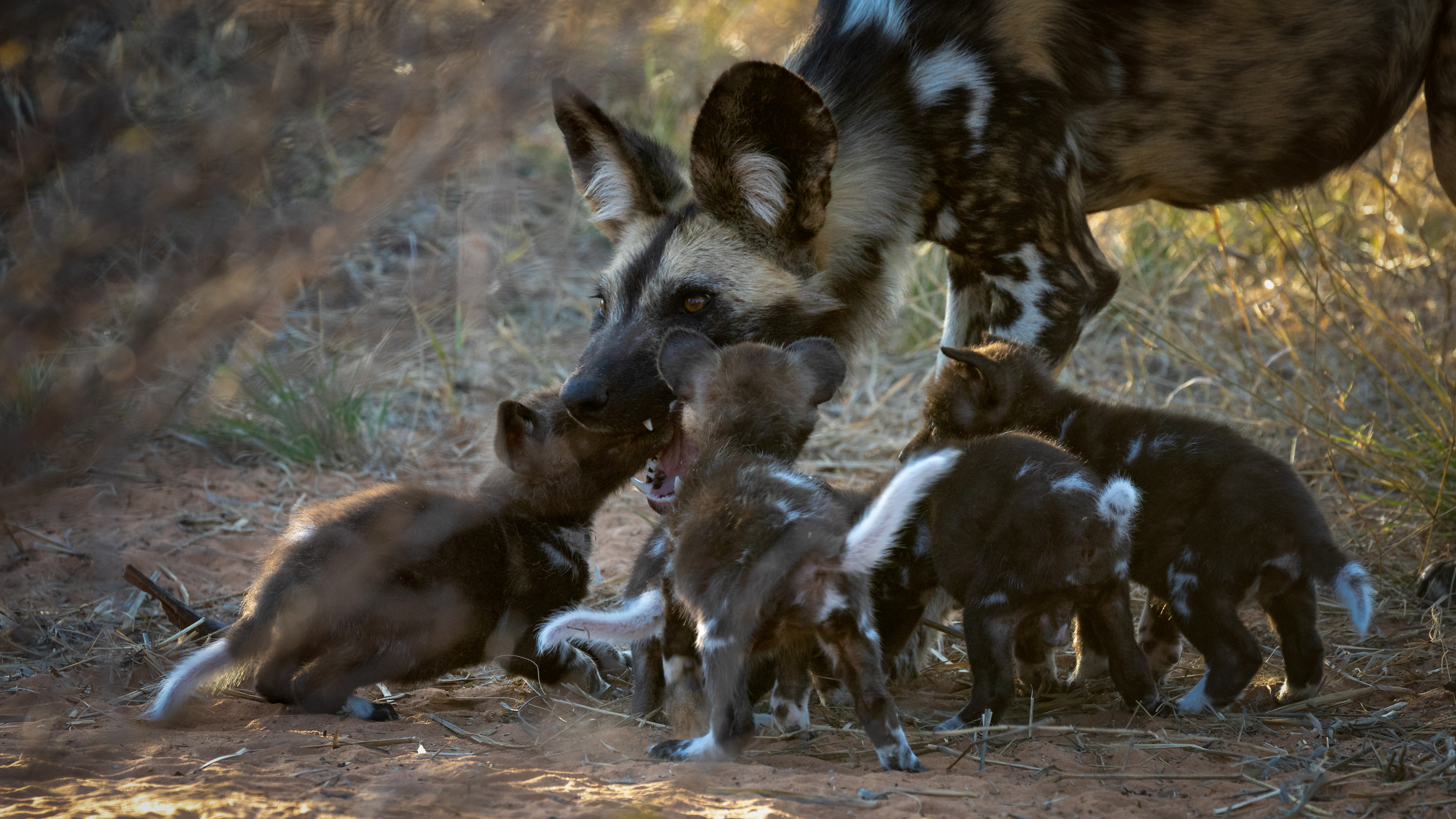
Regurgitating food for puppies at den site at Working with Wildlife

The African wild dog have strong social bonds, stronger than those of sympatric lions and spotted hyenas; thus, solitary living and hunting are extremely rare in the species. It lives in permanent packs consisting of two to 27 adults and yearling pups. The typical pack size in the Kruger National Park and the Maasai Mara is four or five adults, while packs in Moremi and Selous Game Reserves contain eight or nine. However, larger packs have been observed and temporary aggregations of hundreds of individuals may have gathered in response to the seasonal migration of vast springbok herds in Southern Africa. Males and females have separate dominance hierarchies, with the latter usually being led by the oldest female. Males may be led by the oldest male, but these can be supplanted by younger specimens; thus, some packs may contain elderly male former pack leaders. The dominant pair typically monopolises breeding. The species differs from most other social carnivorans in that males remain in the natal pack, while females disperse (a pattern also found in primates such as gorillas, chimpanzees, and red colobuses). Furthermore, males in any given pack tend to outnumber females 3:1. Dispersing females join other packs and evict some of the resident females related to the other pack members, thus preventing inbreeding and allowing the evicted individuals to find new packs of their own and breed. Males rarely disperse, and when they do, they are invariably rejected by other packs already containing males. Although arguably the most social canid, the species lacks the elaborate facial expressions and body language found in the wolf, likely because of the African wild dog's less hierarchical social structure. Furthermore, while elaborate facial expressions are important for wolves in re-establishing bonds after long periods of separation from their family groups, they are not as necessary to African wild dogs, which remain together for much longer periods. The species does have an extensive vocal repertoire consisting of twittering, whining, yelping, squealing, whispering, barking, growling, gurling, rumbling, moaning and hooing.

African wild dog populations in East Africa appear to have no fixed breeding season, whereas those in Southern Africa usually breed during the April–July period. During estrus, the female is closely accompanied by a single male, which keeps other members of the same sex at bay. The estrus period can last as long as 20 days. The copulatory tie characteristic of mating in most canids has been reported to be absent or very brief (less than one minute) in African wild dog, possibly an adaptation to the prevalence of larger predators in its environment. The gestation period lasts 69–73 days, with the interval between each pregnancy being 12–14 months typically. The African wild dog produces more pups than any other canid, with litters containing around six to 16 pups, with an average of 10, thus indicating that a single female can produce enough young to form a new pack every year. Because the amount of food necessary to feed more than two litters would be impossible to acquire by the average pack, breeding is strictly limited to the dominant female, which may kill the pups of subordinates. After giving birth, the mother stays close to the pups in the den, while the rest of the pack hunts. She typically drives away pack members approaching the pups until the latter are old enough to eat solid food at three to four weeks of age. The pups leave the den around the age of three weeks and are suckled outside. The pups are weaned at the age of five weeks, when they are fed regurgitated meat by the other pack members. By seven weeks, the pups begin to take on an adult appearance, with noticeable lengthening in the legs, muzzle, and ears. Once the pups reach the age of eight to 10 weeks, the pack abandons the den and the young follow the adults during hunts. The youngest pack members are permitted to eat first on kills, a privilege which ends once they become yearlings. African wild dogs have an average lifespan of about 10 to 11 years in the wild.

When separated from the pack, an African wild dog becomes depressed and can die as a result of broken heart syndrome.

=== Male/female ratio ===
Packs of African wild dogs have a high ratio of males to females. This is a consequence of the males mostly staying with the pack whilst female offspring disperse and is supported by a changing sex-ratio in consecutive litters. Those born to maiden females contain a higher proportion of males, second litters are half and half and subsequent litters biased towards females with this trend increasing as females get older. As a result, the earlier litters provide stable hunters whilst the higher ratio of dispersals amongst the females stops a pack from getting too big.

=== Sneeze communication and 'voting' ===
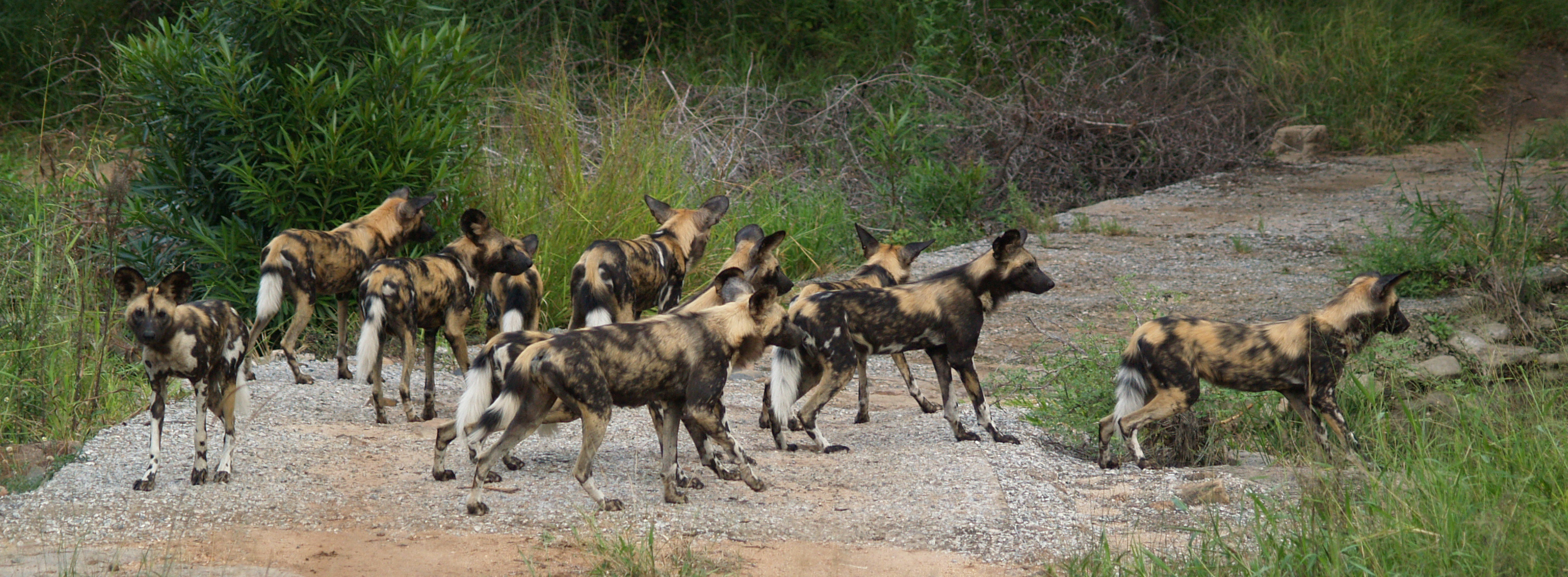
African wild dog pack in Kruger National Park

Populations in the Okavango Delta have been observed 'rallying' before setting out to hunt. Not every rally results in a departure, but departure becomes more likely when more individual dogs 'sneeze'. These sneezes are characterized by a short, sharp exhale through the nostrils. When members of dominant mating pairs sneeze first, the group is much more likely to depart. If a dominant dog initiates, around three sneezes guarantee departure. When less dominant dogs sneeze first, if enough others also sneeze (about 10), then the group will go hunting. Researchers assert that wild dogs in Botswana "use a specific vocalization (the sneeze) along with a variable quorum response mechanism in the decision-making process [to go hunting at a particular moment]".

=== Inbreeding avoidance ===
Because the African wild dog largely exists in fragmented, small populations, its existence is endangered. Inbreeding avoidance by mate selection is a characteristic of the species and has important potential consequences for population persistence. Inbreeding is rare within natal packs. Inbreeding may have been selected against evolutionarily because it leads to the expression of recessive deleterious alleles. Computer simulations indicate that all populations continuing to avoid incestuous mating will become extinct within 100 years due to the unavailability of unrelated mates. Thus, the impact of reduced numbers of suitable unrelated mates will likely have a severe demographic impact on the future viability of small wild dog populations.

=== Hunting and diet ===
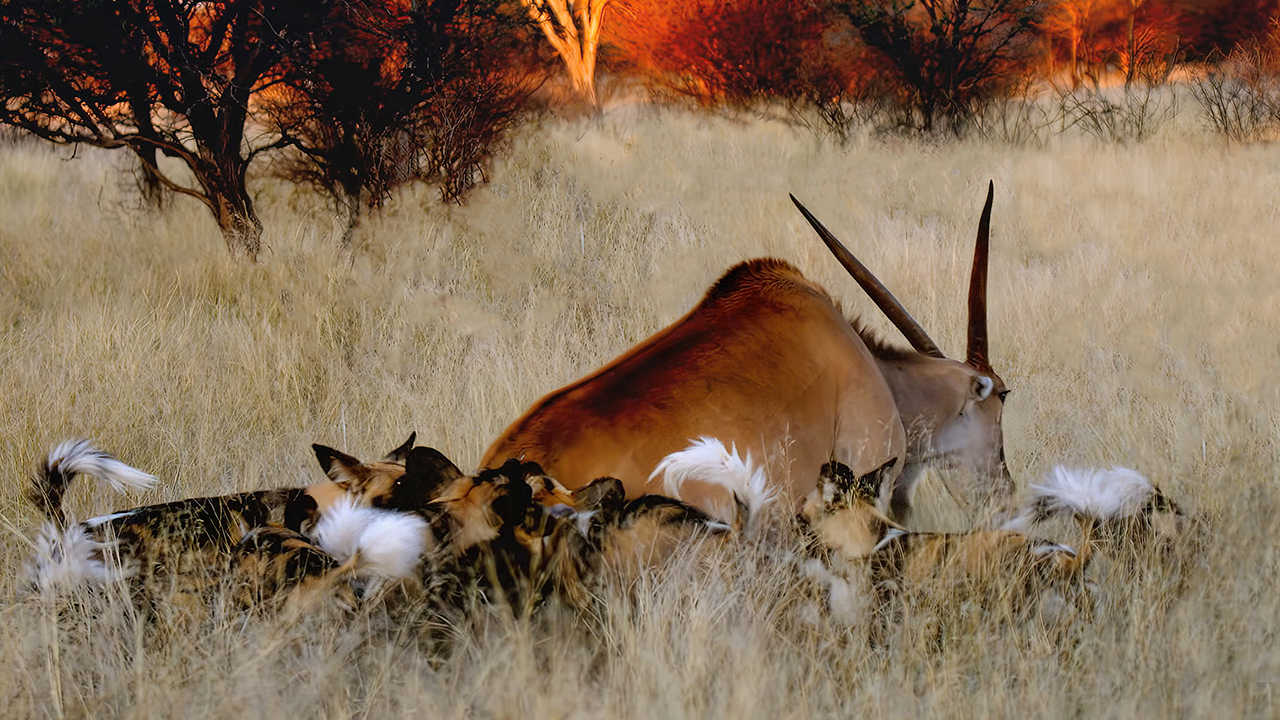
African wild dogs kill a common eland

The African wild dog is a specialised pack hunter of common medium-sized antelopes. It is a primarily diurnal predator and hunts by approaching prey silently, then chasing it in a pursuit clocking at up to 66 km/h (41 mph) for 10–60 minutes. The average chase covers some 2 km (1.2 mi), during which the prey animal, if large, is repeatedly bitten on the legs, belly, and rump until it stops running, while smaller prey is simply pulled down and torn apart.

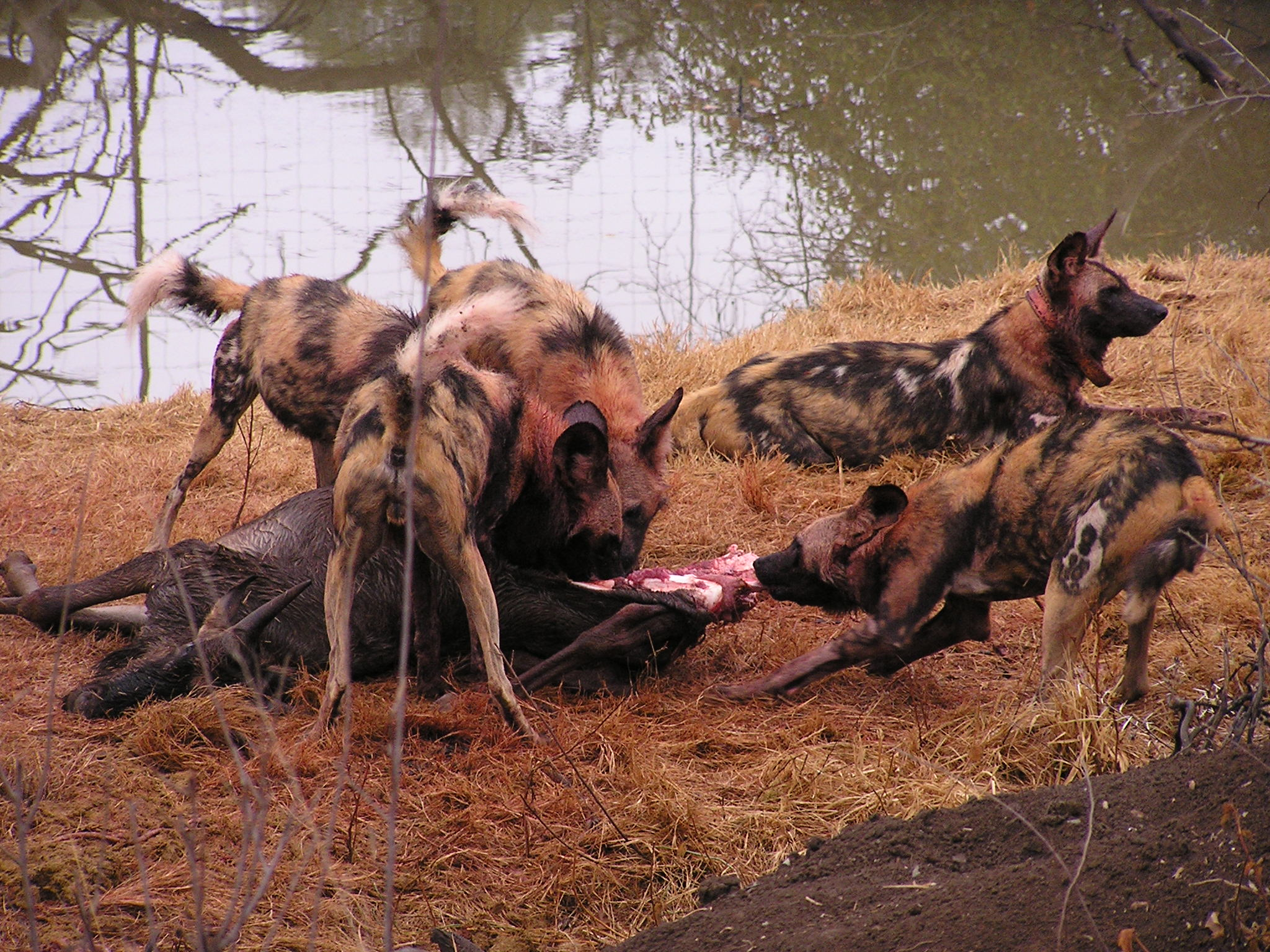
African wild dog pack consuming a blue wildebeest in Madikwe Game Reserve, South Africa

African wild dogs adjust their hunting strategy to the particular prey species. They will rush at wildebeest to panic the herd and isolate a vulnerable individual, but pursue territorial antelope species (which defend themselves by running in wide circles) by cutting across the arc to foil their escape. Medium-sized prey is often killed in 2–5 minutes, whereas larger prey such as wildebeest may take half an hour to pull down. Male wild dogs usually perform the task of grabbing dangerous prey, such as warthogs, by the nose. A species-wide study showed that by preference, where available, five prey species were the most regularly selected, namely the greater kudu, Thomson's gazelle, impala, Cape bushbuck and blue wildebeest. More specifically, in East Africa, its most common prey is the Thomson's gazelle, while in Central and Southern Africa, it targets impala, reedbuck, kob, lechwe and springbok, and smaller prey such as common duiker, dik-dik, hares, spring hares, insects and cane rats. Staple prey sizes are usually between 15 and 200 kg (33 and 441 lb), though some local studies put upper prey sizes as variously 90 to 135 kg (198 to 298 lb). In the case of larger species such as kudu and wildebeest, calves are largely but not exclusively targeted. However, certain packs in the Serengeti specialized in hunting adult plains zebras weighing up to 240 kg (530 lb) quite frequently. Another study claimed that some prey taken by wild dogs could weigh up to 289 kg (637 lb). This includes African buffalo juveniles during the dry season when herds are small and calves less protected. Footage from Lower Zambezi National Park taken in 2021 showed a large pack of African wild dogs hunting an adult, healthy buffalo, though this is apparently extremely rare. One pack was recorded to occasionally prey on bat-eared foxes, rolling on the carcasses before eating them. African wild dogs rarely scavenge, but have on occasion been observed to appropriate carcasses from spotted hyenas, leopards, cheetahs, lions, and animals caught in snares.

Hunting success varies with prey type, vegetation cover and pack size, but African wild dogs tend to be very successful: often more than 60% of their chases end in a kill, sometimes up to 90%. An analysis of 1,119 chases by a pack of six Okavango wild dogs showed that most were short distance uncoordinated chases, and the individual kill rate was only 15.5 percent. Because kills are shared, each dog enjoyed an efficient benefit–cost ratio. A compilation of success rates for different prey species, of different ages and under various success parameters, found that the average hunting success rate for African wild dogs is 31.2%, which seems to debunk the idea of a success rate of over 80% that would make the species "the most efficient hunters".

Small prey such as rodents, hares and birds are hunted singly, with dangerous prey such as cane rats and Old World porcupines being killed with a quick and well-placed bite to avoid injury. Small prey is eaten entirely, while large animals are stripped of their meat and organs, leaving the skin, head, and skeleton intact. The African wild dog is a fast eater, with a pack being able to consume a Thomson's gazelle in 15 minutes. In the wild, the species' consumption is 1.2–5.9 kg (2.6–13.0 lb) per African wild dog a day, with one pack of 17–43 individuals in East Africa having been recorded to kill three animals per day on average.

Unlike most social predators, African wild dogs will regurgitate food for other adults as well as young family members. Pups old enough to eat solid food are given first priority at kills, eating even before the dominant pair; subordinate adult dogs help feed and protect the pups.

It has been found that African wild dogs packs in the Okavango Delta feed on jackalberry fruits just before going out on the hunt; older individuals consume more fruit than others, and this is probably a learned behaviour, explaining why it has not been found in wild dogs elsewhere.

=== Enemies and competitors ===
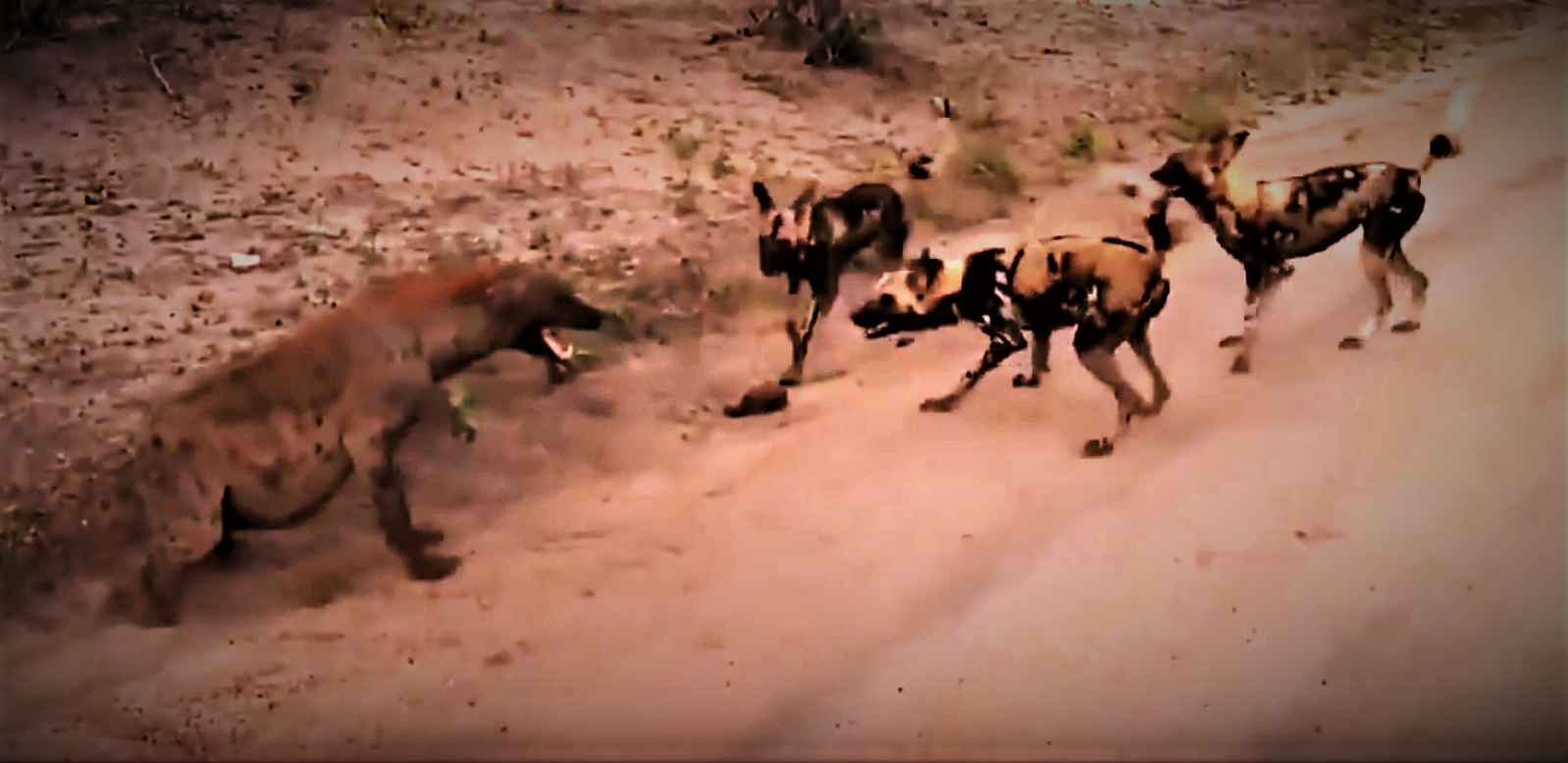
Pack confronting a spotted hyena in Sabi Sand Game Reserve

Lions dominate African wild dogs and are a major source of mortality for both adults and pups. Population densities are usually low in areas where lions are more abundant. One pack reintroduced into Etosha National Park was wiped out by lions. A population crash in lions in the Ngorongoro Conservation Area during the 1960s resulted in an increase in African wild dog sightings, only for their numbers to decline once the lions recovered. As with other large predators killed by lion prides, the dogs are usually killed and left uneaten by the lions, indicating the competitive rather than predatory nature of the lions' dominance. However, a few cases have been reported of old and wounded lions falling prey to African wild dogs. On occasion, packs of wild dogs have been observed defending pack members attacked by single lions, sometimes successfully. One pack in the Okavango in March 2016 was photographed by safari guides waging "an incredible fight" against a lioness that attacked a subadult dog at an impala kill, which forced the lioness to retreat, although the subadult dog died. A pack of four wild dogs was observed furiously defending an old adult male dog from a male lion that attacked it at a kill; the dog survived and rejoined the pack.

African wild dogs commonly lose their kills to larger predators. Spotted hyenas are important kleptoparasites and follow packs of African wild dogs to appropriate their kills. They typically inspect areas where wild dogs have rested and eat any food remains they find. When approaching wild dogs at a kill, solitary hyenas approach cautiously and attempt to take off with a piece of meat unnoticed, though they may be mobbed in the attempt. When operating in groups, spotted hyenas are more successful in pirating African wild dog kills, though the dogs' greater tendency to assist each other puts them at an advantage against spotted hyenas, which rarely work cooperatively. Cases of African wild dogs scavenging from spotted hyenas are rare. Although African wild dog packs can easily repel solitary hyenas, on the whole, the relationship between the two species is a one-sided benefit for the hyenas, with African wild dog densities being negatively correlated with high hyena populations. In the Selous Game Reserve, it has been reported that African wild dogs lose 2% of their kills to spotted hyenas, less than 1% to lions, and another less than 1% to larger packs of their own species. It has been estimated that a 25% kill loss rate would require African wild dogs to spend 7.6–12 hours per day hunting to recover the wasted energy, which is unfeasible and makes them extremely vulnerable to kleptoparasitism. Beyond piracy, cases of interspecific killing of African wild dogs by spotted hyenas are documented. African wild dogs are apex predators, only fatally losing contests to larger social carnivores. When briefly unprotected, wild dog pups may occasionally be vulnerable to large eagles, such as the martial eagle, when they venture out of their dens.

== Threats ==
The African wild dog is primarily threatened by habitat fragmentation, which results from human–wildlife conflict, transmission of infectious diseases and high mortality rates; it has been exterminated in large parts of North and West Africa, and its population has greatly reduced in Central Africa, Uganda and much of Kenya. Surveys in the Central African Republic's Chinko area revealed that the African wild dog population decreased from 160 individuals in 2012 to 26 individuals in 2017. At the same time, transhumant pastoralists from the border area with Sudan moved in the area with their livestock.

== Conservation ==
The non-governmental organization African Wild Dog Conservancy began working in 2003 to conserve the African wild dog in northeastern and coastal Kenya, a convergence zone of two biodiversity hotspots. This area largely consists of community lands inhabited by pastoralists. With the help of local people, a pilot study was launched confirming the presence of a population of wild dogs largely unknown to conservationists. Over the next 16 years, local ecological knowledge revealed this area to be a significant refuge for African wild dogs and an important wildlife corridor connecting Kenya's Tsavo National Parks with the Horn of Africa in an increasingly human-dominated landscape. This project has been identified as a wild dog conservation priority by the IUCN/SSC Canid Specialist Group.

== In culture ==
=== Ancient Egypt ===
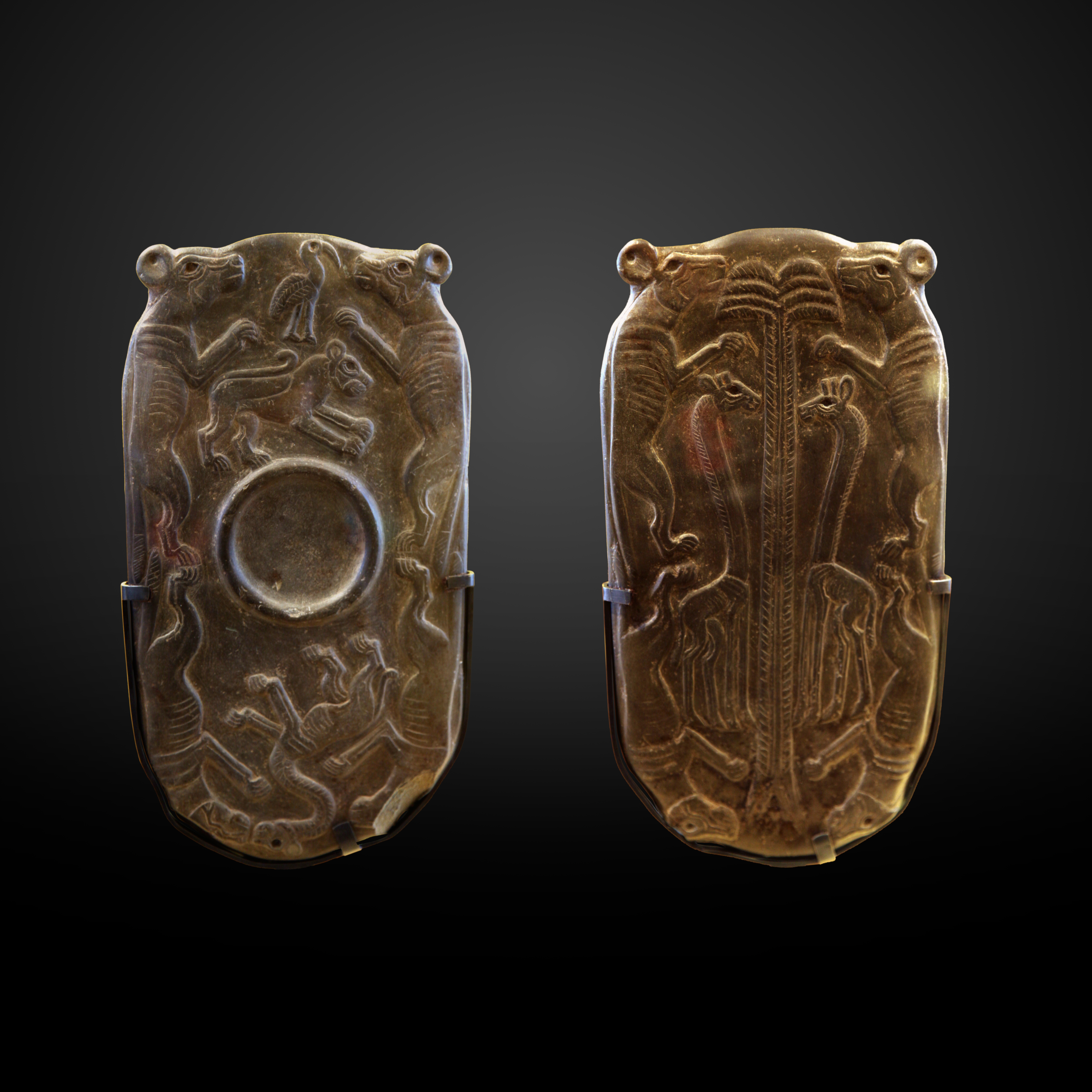
Cosmetic palette from the Naqada III period depicting African wild dogs, Louvre

Depictions of African wild dogs are prominent on cosmetic palettes and other objects from Egypt's predynastic period, likely symbolising order over chaos and the transition between the wild and the domestic dog. Predynastic hunters may have identified with the African wild dog, as the Hunters Palette shows them wearing the animals' tails on their belts. By the dynastic period, African wild dog illustrations became much less represented, and the animal's symbolic role was largely taken over by the African wolf.

=== Ethiopia ===
According to Enno Littmann, the people of Ethiopia's Tigray Region believed that injuring a wild dog with a spear would result in the animal dipping its tail in its wounds and flicking the blood at its assailant, causing instant death. For this reason, Tigrean shepherds used to repel wild dog attacks with pebbles rather than with edged weapons.

=== San people ===
The African wild dog also plays a prominent role in the mythology of Southern Africa's San people. In one story, the wild dog is indirectly linked to the origin of death, as the hare is cursed by the moon to be forever hunted by African wild dogs after the hare rebuffs the moon's promise to allow all living things to be reborn after death. Another story has the god Cagn taking revenge on the other gods by sending a group of men transformed into African wild dogs to attack them, though who won the battle is never revealed. The San of Botswana see the African wild dog as the ultimate hunter and traditionally believe that shamans and medicine men can transform themselves into wild dogs. Some San hunters will smear African wild dog bodily fluids on their feet before a hunt, believing that doing so will give them the animal's boldness and agility. Nevertheless, the species does not figure prominently in San rock art, with the only notable example being a frieze in Mount Erongo showing a pack hunting two antelopes.

=== Ndebele ===
The Ndebele have a story explaining why the African wild dog hunts in packs: in the beginning, when the first wild dog's wife was sick, the other animals were concerned. An impala went to hare, who was a medicine man. Hare gave Impala a calabash of medicine, warning him not to turn back on the way to Wild Dog's den. Impala was startled by the scent of a leopard and turned back, spilling the medicine. A zebra then went to Hare, who gave him the same medicine along with the same advice. On the way, Zebra turned back when he saw a black mamba, thus breaking the gourd. A moment later a terrible howling was heard: Wild Dog's wife had died. Wild Dog went outside and saw Zebra standing over the broken gourd of medicine, so Wild Dog and his family chased Zebra and tore him to shreds. To this day, African wild dogs hunt zebras and impalas as revenge for their failure to deliver the medicine that could have saved Wild Dog's wife.

== In media ==
=== Documentary ===
- A Wild Dog's Tale (2013), a single painted dog (named Solo by researchers) befriends hyenas and jackals in Okavango, hunting together. Solo feeds and cares for jackal pups.
- The Pale Pack, Savage Kingdom, Season 1 (2016), was the story of Botswana African wild dog pack leaders Teemana and Molao written and directed by Brad Bestelink, and narrated by Charles Dance premiered on National Geographic.
- Dynasties (2018 TV series), episode 4, Produced by Nick Lyon: Tait is the elderly matriarch of a pack of painted wolves in Zimbabwe's Mana Pools National Park. Her pack is driven out of their territory by Tait's daughter, Blacktip, the matriarch of a rival pack in need of more space for their large family of 32. Their combined territory also shrunk over Tait's lifetime due to the expansion of human, hyena and lion territories. Tait leads her family into the territory of a lion pride in the midst of a drought, with Blacktip's pack in an eight month long pursuit. When Tait died, the pack was observed performing a rare "singing", the purpose of which is unclear.

== See also ==
- African Wild Dog Conservancy
- Botswana Wild Dog Research Project
- Harnas Wildlife Foundation
- Institute of Zoology
- Painted Dog Conservation
- Wildlife Conservation Network
