= Marisela gregoriana =

Marisela gregoriana Temporal range: Late Pliocene

Scientific classification
- Kingdom: Animalia
- Phylum: Chordata
- Class: Mammalia
- Infraclass: Placentalia
- Order: Rodentia
- Suborder: Hystricomorpha
- Infraorder: Hystricognathi
- Parvorder: Caviomorpha
- Superfamily: Octodontoidea
- Genus: †Marisela
- Species: †M. gregoriana

Binomial name
- †Marisela gregoriana Vucetich et al., 2010

Extinct species of rodent

Marisela is an extinct genus of rodent that lived during the Piacenzian.

== Distribution ==
Fossils of M. gregoriana hail from the San Gregorio Formation of Venezuela.
