= Helanshania =

Helanshania Temporal range: Oligocene

Scientific classification
- Kingdom: Animalia
- Phylum: Chordata
- Class: Mammalia
- Infraclass: Placentalia
- Order: Rodentia
- Family: Ctenodactylidae
- Genus: †Helanshania; Vianey-Liaud et al., 2010
- Species: †H. deserta

Binomial name
- †Helanshania deserta Vianey-Liaud et al., 2010

Extinct genus of rodents

Helanshania is an extinct genus of ctenodactylid that lived during the Oligocene epoch.

== Distribution ==
Helanshania deserta inhabited Inner Mongolia.
