= Acinacodus =

Acinacodus Temporal range: Lower Cretaceous

Scientific classification
- Domain: Eukaryota
- Kingdom: Animalia
- Phylum: Chordata
- Class: Mammalia
- Order: †Eutriconodonta
- Family: †Amphidontidae
- Genus: †Acinacodus; Lopatin, Maschenko & Averianov, 2010

Species
- A. tagaricus Lopatin, Maschenko & Averianov, 2010 (type)

Extinct genus of mammals

Acinacodus is an extinct genus of amphidontid "eutriconodont" which existed in Shestakovo 1 locality in Western Siberia, Russia during the early Cretaceous period. It was described by A. V. Lopatin, E. N. Maschenko and A. O. Averianov in 2010, and the type species is Acinacodus tagaricus.
