= Omoiosicista =

Omoiosicista Temporal range: Burdigalian

Scientific classification
- Kingdom: Animalia
- Phylum: Chordata
- Class: Mammalia
- Order: Rodentia
- Family: Dipodidae
- Genus: †Omoiosicista; Kimura, 2010
- Species: †O. fui

Binomial name
- †Omoiosicista fui Kimura, 2010

Extinct genus of rodents

Omoiosicista is an extinct genus of dipodid rodent which existed in central Nei Mongol, China, during the early Miocene (middle Burdigalian age). It was first named by Yuri Kimura in 2010 and the type species is Omoiosicista fui.
