= Mazateronodon =

Mazateronodon Temporal range: Middle Eocene, 42–37 Ma

Scientific classification
- Domain: Eukaryota
- Kingdom: Animalia
- Phylum: Chordata
- Class: Mammalia
- Order: Primates
- Suborder: Strepsirrhini
- Family: †Notharctidae
- Genus: †Mazateronodon; Marigó et al., 2010
- Species: †M. endemicus

Binomial name
- †Mazateronodon endemicus Marigó et al., 2010

Extinct genus of primates

Mazateronodon is a genus of adapiform primate that lived in Europe during the middle Eocene.
