= Alloeumyarion =

Alloeumyarion Temporal range: Early Miocene

Scientific classification
- Kingdom: Animalia
- Phylum: Chordata
- Class: Mammalia
- Order: Rodentia
- Family: Cricetidae
- Subfamily: Eumyarioninae
- Genus: †Alloeumyarion; Qiu et al., 2010
- Species: †A. sihongensis

Binomial name
- †Alloeumyarion sihongensis Qiu et al., 2010

Extinct genus of rodents

Alloeumyarion is an extinct genus of Cricetidae which existed in China during the early Miocene period. It was first named by Qiu Zhu-Ding in 2010, and the type species is Alloeumyarion sihongensis.
