= Erlianomys =

Erlianomys Temporal range: Early Eocene

Scientific classification
- Domain: Eukaryota
- Kingdom: Animalia
- Phylum: Chordata
- Class: Mammalia
- Order: Rodentia
- Infraorder: Myodonta
- Genus: †Erlianomys; Li & Meng, 2010
- Species: †E. combinatus

Binomial name
- †Erlianomys combinatus Li & Meng, 2010

Extinct genus of rodents

Erlianomys combinatus is an extinct species of myodont rodent which existed in Inner Mongolia, China, during the early Eocene period.
