= Ameuromys =

Ameuromys Temporal range: Tortonian

Scientific classification
- Kingdom: Animalia
- Phylum: Chordata
- Class: Mammalia
- Order: Rodentia
- Family: Muridae
- Genus: †Ameuromys; Mein and Pickford, 2010
- Species: †A. grandis

Binomial name
- †Ameuromys grandis Mein and Pickford, 2010

Extinct genus of gerbilline rodent

Ameuromys is an extinct monotypic genus of gerbilline rodent that lived in North Africa during the Vallesian land mammal age of the Tortonian stage of the Miocene epoch.

== Etymology ==
The generic name Ameuromys honours the scientist Mme Arbeha Ameur-Chehbeur for her contributions to Neogene rodent palaeontology in North Africa. The specific epithet of the type species, Ameuromys grandis, references the relatively large body proportions of the animal.
