= Amphidontidae =

Amphidontidae Temporal range: Early Jurassic-Early Cretaceous, ~184–125 Ma

Scientific classification
- Kingdom: Animalia
- Phylum: Chordata
- Class: Mammalia
- Order: †Eutriconodonta
- Family: †Amphidontidae; Simpson, 1925

Genera
- Acinacodus Lopatin, Maschenko & Averianov, 2010; Amphidon Simpson, 1925; Aploconodon Simpson, 1925; Comodon Kretzoi & Kretzoi, 2000; Gobiotheriodon (Trofimov, 1980) Trofimov, 1997; Hakusanodon Rourier, Isaji & Manabe, 2007; Juchilestes Gao et al., 2010; Manchurodon Yabe & Shikama, 1938; Nakunodon Yadagiri, 1985

Extinct family of mammals

The Amphidontidae are a family of extinct mammals from the Early Jurassic to the Early Cretaceous, belonging to the eutriconodonts. It contains most of the species previously belonged to Amphilestidae.

== Phylogeny ==
Cladogram after Marisol Montellano, James A. Hopson, James M. Clark (2008) and Gao et al. (2010).

- Amphidontidae
  - Aploconodon
  - - - Comodon
      - Hakusanodon
      - Juchilestes
    - - Amphidon
      - Gobiotheriodon
      - - Manchurodon
        - Nakunodon

== Taxonomy ==
Based on the works by Mikko Haaramo and the Palaeofile website.

- Family †Amphidontidae Simpson 1925
  - Genus †Acinacodus Lopatin, Maschenko & Averianov 2010
    - Species †Acinacodus tagaricus Lopatin, Maschenko & Averianov 2010
  - Genus †Aploconodon Simpson 1925
    - Species †Aploconodon comoensis Simpson 1925
  - Genus †Comodon Kretzoi & Kretzoi 2000 non Stein 1859 [Phascolodon Simpson 1925; Phascolotheridium Cifelli & Dykes 2001]
    - Species †Comodon gidleyi (Simpson 1925) Kretzoi & Kretzoi 2000 [Phascolodon gidleyi Simpson 1925; Phascolotheridium gidleyi (Simpson 1925) Cifelli & Dykes 2001]
  - Genus †Hakusanodon Rougier, Isaji & Manabe 2007
    - Species †Hakusanodon archaeus Rougier, Isaji & Manabe 2007
  - Genus †Juchilestes Gao et al. 2009
    - Species †Juchilestes liaoningensis Gao et al. 2009
  - Genus †Amphidon Simpson 1925
    - Species †Amphidon superstes Simpson 1925
  - Genus †Gobiotheriodon Trofimov 1997 [Gobiodon Trofimov 1980 non Bleeker 1856]
    - Species †Gobiotheriodon infinitus (Trofimov 1980) Trofimov 1997 [Gobiodon infinitus Trofimov 1980]
  - Genus †Manchurodon Yabe & Shikama 1938
    - Species †Manchurodon simplicidens Yabe & Shikama 1938
  - Genus †Nakunodon Yadagiri 1985
    - Species †Nakunodon paikasiensis Yadagiri 1985
