= Sinodonomys =

Sinodonomys Temporal range: Burdigalian

Scientific classification
- Kingdom: Animalia
- Phylum: Chordata
- Class: Mammalia
- Order: Rodentia
- Family: Dipodidae
- Genus: †Sinodonomys; Kimura, 2010
- Species: †S. simplex

Binomial name
- †Sinodonomys simplex Kimura, 2010

Extinct genus of rodents

Sinodonomys is an extinct genus of dipodid rodent which existed in central Nei Mongol, China, during the early Miocene (middle Burdigalian age). It was first named by Yuri Kimura in 2010 and the type species is Sinodonomys simplex.
