= Faraframys =

Faraframys Temporal range: Tortonian

Scientific classification
- Kingdom: Animalia
- Phylum: Chordata
- Class: Mammalia
- Order: Rodentia
- Family: Muridae
- Subfamily: Lophiomyinae
- Genus: †Faraframys; Mein and Pickford, 2010
- Species: †F. heissigi

Binomial name
- †Faraframys heissigi Mein and Pickford, 2010

Extinct genus of lophiomyine rodent

Faraframys is an extinct monotypic genus of lophiomyine rodent that lived in North Africa during the Tortonian stage of the Miocene epoch.

== Etymology ==
The generic name Faraframys, references the Farafra Oasis and the Greek word mys, meaning mouse. The specific epithet of the type species, Faraframys heissigi, honours Kurt Heissig, the first palaeontologist to scientifically describe Late Miocene rodents from the Western Desert of Egypt.
