= Khari Nadi Formation =

Neogene fossiliferous formation in India

- Stratigraphic range: Early Miocene, Aquitanian-Burdigalian; ~23.07–18.09 Ma
- Type: Geological formation
- Underlies: Maniyara Fort Formation
- Overlies: Chhasra Formationn

Lithology
- Primary: Sandstone
- Other: Claystone

Location
- Coordinates: 23.4°N 68.8°E
- Approximate paleocoordinates: 12.5°N 69.1°E
- Region: Gujarat
- Country: India

Type section
- Named for: Khari Nadi
- Khari Nadi Formation (India)

The Khari Nadi Formation is a geological formation in western India that dates back to the Early Miocene epoch. The formation is well known for its sirenian diversity and a fossilized whale fall.

== Lithology ==
The Khari Nadi Formation is preceded by Maniyara Fort Formation of Oligocene, which is mostly devoid of vertebrate fossils but has reports of Nummulites, Lepidocyclina, Clypeus, and Nannoplanktons, and succeed by Chhasra Formation of Middle Miocene, which has reports of gastropods, bivalves, echinoids, bryozoans and vertebrates.

The type locality of Khari Nadi Formation is only known from western region of Kutch at Khari River in Gujarat, India.

The lithology typically vary by 3 parts, the Lower part has silty shale and thin beds of siltstone which are barren of mega and micro fossils and only have gypsum laminae which is parallel to bedding plane, Middle part is extensively burrowed silty shale and features various trace fossils like Skolithos, Diplocraterion, Arenicolites, Ophiomorpha, the Upper part consists of few impure limestone beds and is known for well preserved gastropods, oysters and barnacles.

== Paleobiota ==
=== Molluscs ===
==== Cephalopods ====
Cephalopods of the Khari Nadi Formation
Genus	Species	Location	Materials	Notes	Image
Aturia	A. gujaratensis	Aida	PG/TNA1, a internal mould of the shell.	A aturiid nautiloid.	

==== Gastropods ====
Gastropods of the Khari Nadi Formation
Genus	Species	Location	Materials	Notes	Image
Zaria	Z. angulata	Khari River	NHMW 2008z0256/0002, 10 specimens	A turritellid gastropod.	
Protoma	P. deshayesi	Khari River	NHMW 2008z0256/0001, 1 specimen	A turritellid gastropod.	
Turbinella	T. premekranica	Khari River	NHMW 2008z0256/0003, 3 specimens	A turbinellid gastropod.	
Conus	C. brevis	Khari River	NHMW 2008z0256/0004, 1 specimen	A conid gastropod.	
Architectonica	A. affinis	Khari River	NHMW 2008z0256/0005, 1 specimen	A architectonicid gastropod.	

=== Chondrichthyes ===
==== Selachiis ====
Selachiis of the Khari Nadi Formation
Genus	Species	Location	Materials	Notes	Image
Hemipristris	H. serra	Jangadia	KF-17E, an isolated tooth	A hemigaleid carcharhiniform.	
Otodus	O. chubutensis	Jangadia	KF-17 A-B-C-D, several isolated teeth	An otodontid lamniform, includes Megaselachus chubutensis.	
Carcharhinus	C. sp.	Jangadia	KF-17 J-K, two isolated teeth	A carcharhinid carcharhiniform.	
Carcharodon	C. carcharias	Jangadia	KF-17 G, an incomplete tooth	A lamnid lamniform.	
Galeocerdo	G. cuvier	Baadra	KF-66, an isolated tooth	A galeocerdonid carcharhiniform.	
Galeocerdo	G. mayumbensis	Jangadia	KF-17 E, an isolated tooth	A galeocerdonid carcharhiniform, includes Carcharodon bigelowi.	

==== Batomorphs ====
Batomorphs of the Khari Nadi Formation
Genus	Species	Location	Materials	Notes	Image
Myliobatis	M. sp.	Jangadia	KF-17 H-I, isolated teeth	A myliobatid myliobatiform.	
Rhinoptera	R. sp.	Jangadia	KF-17 L, isolated tooth	A rhinopterid myliobatiform.	
Pristis	P. sp.	Jangadia	KF-17 G, isolated tooth	A pristid.	

=== Actinopterygiis ===
Actinopterygiis of the Khari Nadi Formation
Genus	Species	Location	Materials	Notes	Image
Latidae	indet.	Jangadia	KF-30, neurocranium	A latid perciform.	

=== Reptiles ===
==== Pseudosuchians ====
Pseudosuchians of the Khari Nadi Formation
Genus	Species	Location	Materials	Notes	Image
Rhamphosuchus	R. cf. pachyrhynchus	Samda	KF-40, snout	A large gavialoid, originally though to be an indeterminate tomistomine.	

=== Tethytherians ===
==== Proboscideans ====
Proboscideans of the Khari Nadi Formation
Genus	Species	Location	Materials	Notes	Image
Deinotherium	D. sp.	Samda	KF-27, upper M1 and M2.	A deinotheriid proboscidean.	
Deinotherium	D. sindiense	Samda	GSI A10, right m2	A deinotheriid proboscidean.	
Gomphotheriidae	indet	Pasuda	KF-76, fragmentary molar enamels.	A gomphotheriid proboscidean.	

==== Sirenians ====
Sirenians of the Khari Nadi Formation
Genus	Species	Location	Materials	Notes	Image
Kutchisiren	K. cylindrica	Kotada		A dugongine dugongid.	
Bharatisiren	B. kachchhensis	Aida		A dugongine dugongid.	
Bharatisiren	B. indica	Matanomadh		A dugongine dugongid.	
Dominigia	D. sodhae	Nangia		A dugongine dugongid.	
Kharisiren	K. cristata	Matanomadh		A dugongine dugongid.	

=== Ungulates ===
==== Perissodactyls ====
Perissodactyls of the Khari Nadi Formation
Genus	Species	Location	Materials	Notes	Image
Brachypotherium	B. sp.	Jangadia, Pasuda	KF-9 A-B, m3 and p2 as for Jangadia Specimen; 216/GSI/PAL/CR/07 A-B-C, right upper second molar, right upper last deciduous molar and left anterior premolar as for Pasuda specimen.	A rhinocerotid.	

==== Artiodactyls ====
Artiodactyls of the Khari Nadi Formation
Genus	Species	Location	Materials	Notes	Image
Parabrachyodus	P. hyopotamoides	Fategad	GSI 18097, a partial snout with molar 2-3.	An anthracotheriid.	
Sivameryx	S. palaeindicus	Pasuda	217/GSI/PAL/CR/07 A-B-C, left upper M1 & m2 and left upper pm4	A anthracotheriid .	
Conohyus	C. cf. sindiensis	Pasuda	218/GSI/PAL/CR/07, left lower pm4.	A suid.	
Libycochoerus	L. fategadensis	Fategad	GSI 18098, a fragmentary mandible with pm4 to m3 teeth.	A suid	
Giraffokeryx	G. punjabiensis	Pasuda	219/GSI/PAL/CR/07 A-B-C, fragmentary mandibles with teeth.	A giraffid.	
Dorcatherium	D. naui	Tapar	220/GSI/PAL/CR/07 A-B, fragmentary mandibles with teeth.	A tragulid.	
Cetacea	indet	Rampar Dargah	A whale fall, includes several ribs, Vertebrae and other fragments, discovered alongside several molluscs and echinoids. There are several Osedax holes on the vertebrae.	A cetacean.	

=== Carnivorans ===
==== Caniformes ====
Caniformes of the Khari Nadi Formation
Genus	Species	Location	Materials	Notes	Image
Matanomictis	M. maniyarensis	Matanomadh	IITR-SB 5135, a partial mandible	A mustelid.	
