= Botswana Predator Conservation Trust =

Predator research project in Africa

- Abbreviation: BPCT
- Formation: 1989
- Purpose: Research project on large carnivore species in Botswana
- Location: Okavango Delta, Botswana
- Website: www.bpctrust.org

The Botswana Predator Conservation Trust (BPCT), formerly called the Botswana Wild Dog Research Project in 1989, expanded from addressing wild dog conservation to cover all the large carnivore species in Botswana.

== Description ==
The Botswana Predator Conservation Trust is one of the longest running large predator research projects in Africa, and one of only a handful of its caliber worldwide. BPCT research on wild dogs has made it abundantly clear that the health and welfare of the entire predator population is a key indication of overall health of Botswana's ecosystems.

The Government of Botswana, also acknowledging that appropriate and necessary resource management cannot be undertaken in the absence of accurate information about its natural resources, has entrusted BPCT with the task of leading northern Botswana's conservation and research initiatives for all large carnivores and their associated habitats of the country.

=== Okavango Delta research ===
The Okavango Delta, where most of BPCT's research takes place, is a freshwater wetland of global importance. It is the largest Ramsar International Convention on Wetlands protected site on Earth, and was granted IUCN world heritage status by the World Conservation Union (IUCN).

== See also ==
- Carnivorans of Africa
- Fauna of Botswana
