= Ageitonomys =

Ageitonomys Temporal range: Lower Oligocene

Scientific classification
- Domain: Eukaryota
- Kingdom: Animalia
- Phylum: Chordata
- Class: Mammalia
- Order: Rodentia
- Suborder: Hystricomorpha
- Superfamily: Ctenodactyloidea
- Family: incertae sedis
- Genus: †Ageitonomys; Wang, 2010
- Species: †A. neimongolensis

Binomial name
- †Ageitonomys neimongolensis Wang, 2010

Extinct genus of rodents

Ageitonomys neimongolensis is an extinct species of rodent which existed in Alxa Left Banner, Inner Mongolia (Nei Mongol), China during the early Oligocene period. It was first named by Wang Ban-Yue in 2010.
