= Komba (mammal) =

Komba Temporal range: Early Miocene–Middle Miocene

Scientific classification
- Kingdom: Animalia
- Phylum: Chordata
- Class: Mammalia
- Order: Primates
- Suborder: Strepsirrhini
- Family: Galagidae
- Genus: †Komba; Simpson, 1967

Species
- †Komba robustus (Le Gros Clark and Thomas, 1952); †Komba minor (Le Gros Clark and Thomas, 1952); †Komba winamensis McCrossin, 1992; †Komba walkeri Harrison, 2010

Extinct genus of primates

Komba is an extinct genus of galagos, containing species known from the early to middle Miocene of Kenya and Uganda. A new species, K. walkeri, was described from the early Miocene of Kenya by Terry Harrison in 2010.
