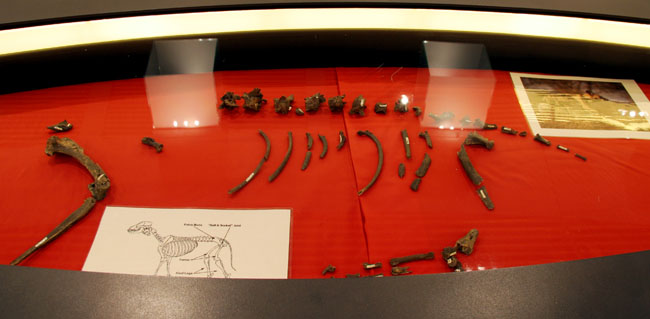
- Fossil of Lycaon sekowei, a possible ancestor of the African wild dog

Scientific classification
- Kingdom: Animalia
- Phylum: Chordata
- Class: Mammalia
- Infraclass: Placentalia
- Order: Carnivora
- Family: Canidae
- Genus: Lycaon
- Species: †L. sekowei

Binomial name
- †Lycaon sekowei Hartstone-Rose et al., 2010

= Lycaon sekowei =

Lycaon sekowei Temporal range: 2–1 Ma Early Pleistocene

Extinct species of carnivore

Lycaon sekowei is an extinct canid species from southern Africa that lived during the early Pleistocene epoch, dating from 2 to 1 million years ago.

Hartstone-Rose and colleagues claimed that L. sekowei was a hypercarnivore just like the modern African wild dog (L. pictus), though its front paws were not as specialized for running. They also proposed that L. sekowei was the ancestor of the wild-dog lineage based on dental morphology similar to that of L. pictus and the European Lycaon-like canids. In 2013, however, Madurell-Malapeira and colleagues considered the hypothesis that the genus Lycaon may have originated from Eurasia and dispersed into Africa by 2 million years ago would be more likely, given the substantial variability of dental characters and the relatively scarce African record of Lycaon-like canids.
