= Kharisiren =

Kharisiren Temporal range: Early Miocene, Aquitanian to Burdigalian

Scientific classification
- Kingdom: Animalia
- Phylum: Chordata
- Class: Mammalia
- Order: Sirenia
- Family: Dugongidae
- Subfamily: Dugonginae
- Genus: †Kharisiren; Saha et al., 2026

Type species
- †Kharisiren cristata Saha et al., 2026

Genus of mammals

Kharisiren is an extinct genus of dugongid known from the Early Miocene Khari Nadi Formation of the Kutch district in Gujarat, India. The genus is monotypic, with K. cristata being the only known species.
