= Darocasorex =

Darocasorex Temporal range: Miocene

Scientific classification
- Kingdom: Animalia
- Phylum: Chordata
- Class: Mammalia
- Order: Eulipotyphla
- Family: Soricidae
- Tribe: Anourosoricini
- Genus: †Darocasorex; Van Dam, 2010

Extinct genus of mammals

Darocasorex (named after the town Daroca in Spain, and close to the place where its fossils were found) is an extinct shrew which existed in Europe during the Miocene epoch. This genus of shrew was first named by Jan A. van Dam in 2010.
