= Parikimys =

Parikimys carpenteri Temporal range: Late Maastrichtian, 69–66 Ma

Scientific classification
- Kingdom: Animalia
- Phylum: Chordata
- Class: Mammalia
- Order: †Multituberculata
- Family: †Neoplagiaulacidae
- Genus: †Parikimys; Wilson et al., 2010
- Species: †P. carpenteri

Binomial name
- †Parikimys carpenteri Wilson et al., 2010

Species of prehistoric mammal

Parikimys carpenteri is an extinct species of prehistoric mammal, a multituberculate which existed in the western United States at the end of the Cretaceous period. The species is named "in honor of the DMNS vertebrate paleontologist Ken Carpenter, whose initial field work in the sparse, non-marine Cretaceous exposures of Weld County inspired this project." Fossils are known from the Laramie Formation of Colorado and the Lance Formation of Wyoming.

While the species shares several morphological characteristics with Mesodma, there are a few characters that set it apart. Parikimys is known from a well preserved left dentary containing p4-m2 as well as p3 alveolus. The species differs from similar taxa (Mesodma) based on pyramidal shaped cones on the m1, which are similar to Cimolodon and more primitive than Mesodma . The mesial aspect of the crown is narrow and forms a V-shaped concavity received the distal end of the p4. The cusps of the internal row are mesiodistally offset from the external row and are distinctly taller than the medial row as well.

A second locality in southern Wyoming described Parikimys, but with specimens roughly 20% smaller than those of the original.
