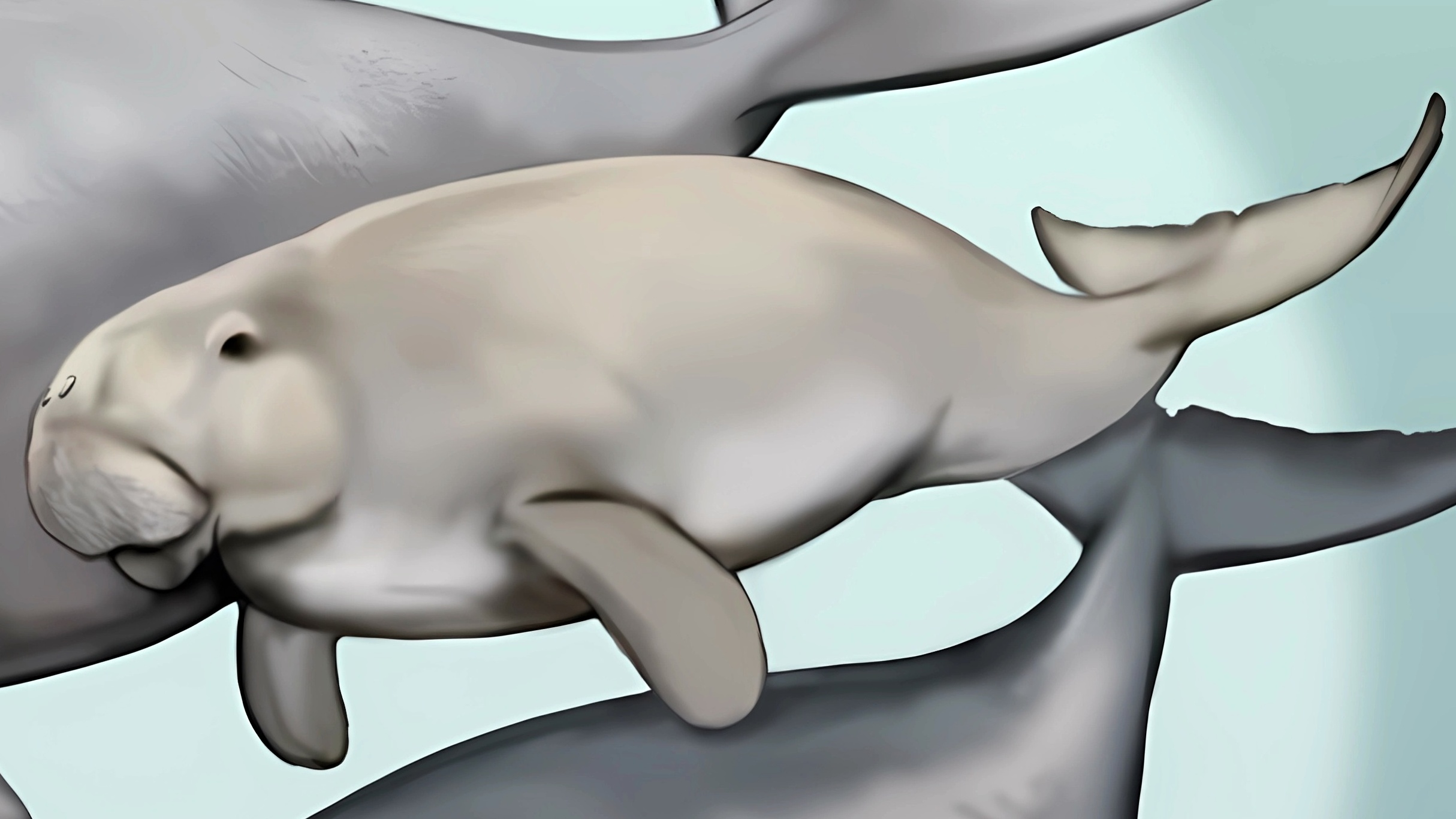

Scientific classification
- Domain: Eukaryota
- Kingdom: Animalia
- Phylum: Chordata
- Class: Mammalia
- Order: Sirenia
- Family: Dugongidae
- Subfamily: Dugonginae
- Genus: †Kutchisiren; Bajpai et al., 2010

Species
- K. cylindrica Bajpai et al., 2010 (type)

= Kutchisiren =

Kutchisiren Temporal range: Miocene, 23.03–15.97 Ma

Kutchisiren is an extinct genus of mammal which existed in what is now India in Khari Nadi Formation during the Miocene period. It was named by S. Bajpai, D. P. Domning, D. P. Das, J. Velez-Juarbe, and V. P. Mishra in 2010, and the type species is Kutchisiren cylindrica. It was originally named Kotadasiren gracilis (as a nomen nudum) in 1994, by Das and Basu.
