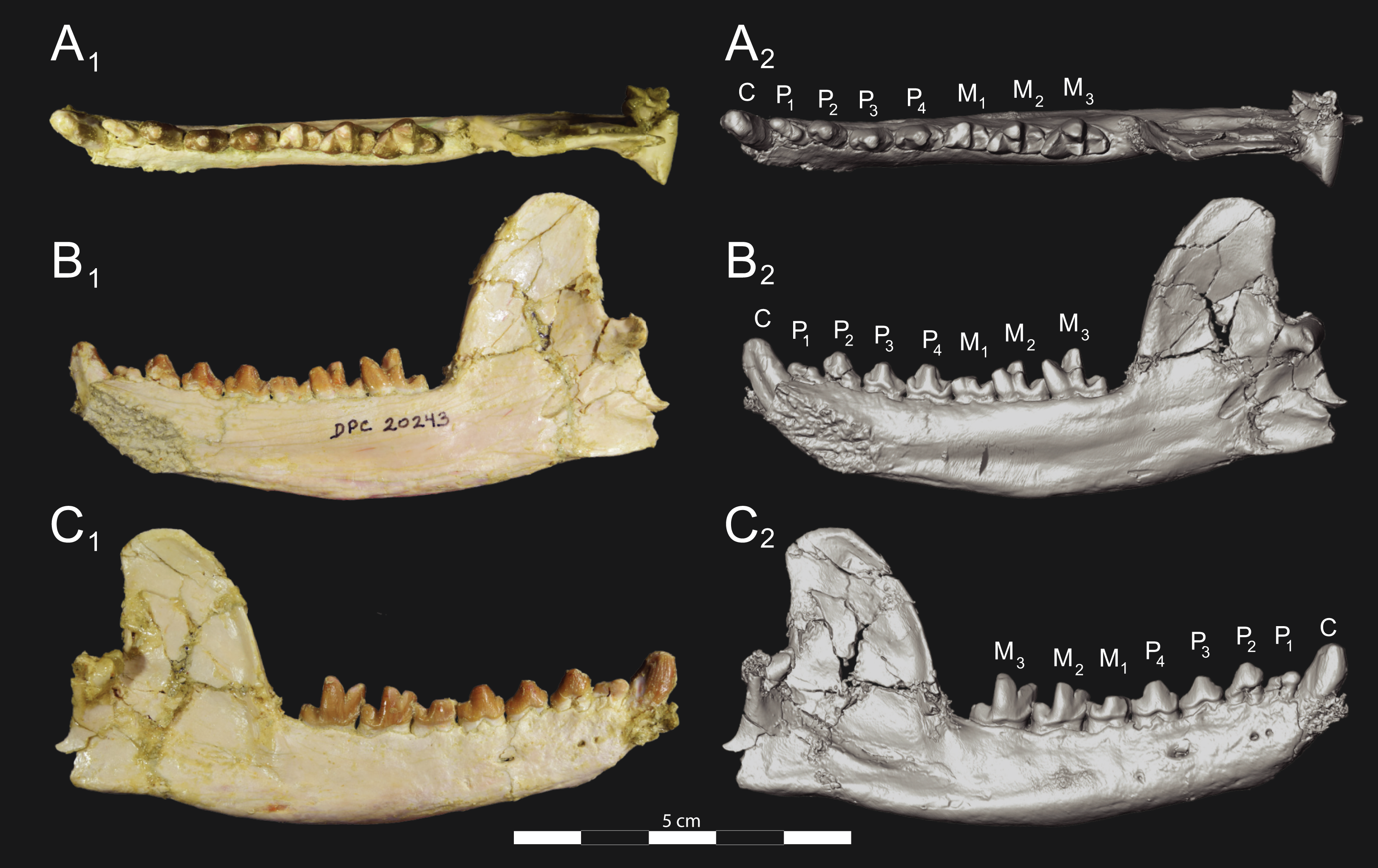
- Holotype right dentary (C–M3) of Brychotherium ephalmos, showing both fossil photo and digital model (left: photo; right: model).

Scientific classification
- Kingdom: Animalia
- Phylum: Chordata
- Class: Mammalia
- Order: †Hyaenodonta
- Family: †Teratodontidae
- Subfamily: †Teratodontinae
- Genus: †Brychotherium; Borths, Holroyd & Seiffert, 2016

Type species
- †Brychotherium ephalmos Borths, Holroyd & Seiffert, 2016

= Brychotherium =

Brychotherium Temporal range: Late Eocene, 37.8–33.9 Ma

Extinct mammal genus

Brychotherium (meaning "greedily eating beast") is an extinct genus of teratodontid hyaenodonts, a group of predatory pan-carnivoran mammals. The order name hyenadont comes from their hyena-like dentition, which refers to their carnassial-like slicing teeth and not to the bone-crushing dentition of modern spotted and brown hyenas. The family name Teratodontidae means "monstrous teeth", referring to their typically large and hypercarnivorous dentition. The genus is dated to the late Eocene, about 34 million years ago in Egypt and contains a single described species, Brychotherium ephalmos (species name meaning "pickled in brine"), named after the saline preservation conditions of the sediments in which it was found. Fossils of B. ephalmos were discovered at Locality 41 (L-41), in the Jebel Qatrani Formation of the Fayum Depression, and the genus was formally described in 2016, with B. ephalmos designated as the type species.

== Phylogeny ==
=== Classification ===
The genus Brychotherium was originally coined by Patricia A. Holroyd in her 1994 doctoral dissertation, where she also coined the species Brychotherium atrox. Though doctoral dissertations do not meet ICZN requirements due to them not being validly published, and never appearing as a valid scientific name in a peer-reviewed journal article, making the genus a nomen nudum. This species is now sometimes considered part of the genus Sinopa as Sinopa atrox, but whether it truly belongs there is still uncertain. 22 years after the first coining of Brychotherium, B. ephalmos was formally designated as the type species of the genus in a paper in 2016 by Matthew R. Borths, Holroyd, and Erik R. Seiffert.

The uncertain status of B. atrox mirrors wider debates in hyaenodont systematics. Hyaenodonts alongside oxyaenids were traditionally classified together in the extinct order Creodonta, which grouped a variety of non-carnivoran carnivorous mammals. However, subsequent work has shown that "Creodonta" is likely a polyphyletic wastebasket taxon, and modern classifications generally treat Oxyaenodonta and Hyaenodonta as separate orders within Pan-Carnivora, closely related to or ancestral to Carnivorans.

The family Teratodontinae is firmly accepted as a monophyletic clade part of the hyenadont order, though its exact relationship with its sister clades Hyainailouridae, Hyaenodontinae , and Proviverrinae has been under debate for some time. Though there are some suggested phylogenies in papers published by Borths, Holroyd, and Seiffert, which put Teratodontinae as a sister clade to Hyainailouridae. Brychotherium's exact place inside Teratodontinae is also not fully understood, but the same papers made a phylogeny tree using tip dating which put the genus as a sister genus to other recognized genera, as seen in the simplified cladogram below. Though this cladogram includes also genera such as Furodon and Glibzegdouia, which are still not as recognized as part of Teratodontinae.

- Teratodontinae
  - Furodon
  - - Glibzegdouia
    - - Brychotherium
      - - Anasinopa
        - Dissopsalis
      - - Teratodon
        - - - Masrasector

== Characteristics ==
B. ephalmos was a small to medium-sized carnivorous mammal, roughly comparable in size to a red fox (Vulpes vulpes) or an American badger (Taxidea taxus), with an estimated body mass of about 5–6 kg (11–13 lb). Its jaws housed specialized slicing teeth characterized by retaining well-developed metaconids and deep talonid basins on the lower molars, producing strong shearing surfaces while retaining more generalized features than in the more hypercarnivorous teratodontines. The upper premolars possessed a distinct, medially shifed protocone swelling, another trait indicating less extreme specialization for flesh-shearing. This combination of cutting blades and modest grinding surfaces suggests that Brychotherium was a generalist carnivore, capable of slicing meat efficiently while still able to process tougher or more varied food items.

== Paleobiology ==
In the Fayum Depression ecosystem, Brychotherium likely occupied the role of a mid-sized predator, preying on small vertebrates and possibly scavenging larger carcasses. While no limb material has been recovered, comparisons with related teratodontines suggest it was a terrestrial hunter, agile but not specialized for high-speed pursuit. Its moderate body size and generalized anatomy make it an important representative of Afro-Arabian hyaenodont evolution, situated among other teratodontines such as Masrasector, Teratodon and Dissopsalis.
