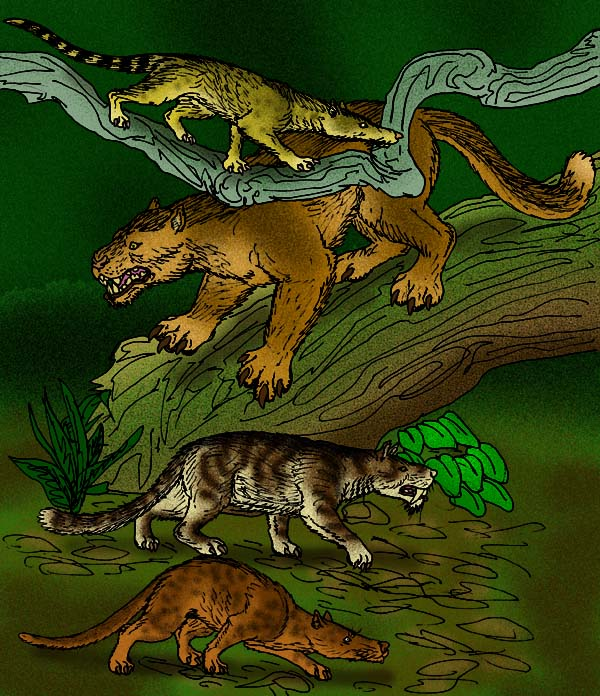
- Various creodonts of the Eocene of Colorado, United States. From top: Tritemnodon, Patriofelis, Machaeroides, and Sinopa

Scientific classification
- Kingdom: Animalia
- Phylum: Chordata
- Class: Mammalia
- Mirorder: Ferae
- Order: †Creodonta; Cope, 1875

Subgroups
- †Hyaenodonta; †Oxyaenidae

Synonyms
- list of synonyms: Creodontia; Creodontidae (Winkler, 1893); Creodontiformes (Kinman, 1994); Creodontina (Pearse, 1936); Creophaga (Kretzoi, 1945); Hyaenodontia (Romer, 1966); Paracarnivora (Kretzoi, 1929); Pseudocreodi (Matthew, 1909); Subdidelphia (Trouessart, 1879)

= Creodonta =

Creodonta Temporal range: Early Paleocene to Late Miocene, 61.6–7.5 Ma (Suspected Late Cretaceous origin for Hyaenodonta, but unconfirmed by fossils yet)

Former order of extinct flesh-eating placental mammals

Creodonta ("meat teeth") is a former order of extinct carnivorous placental mammals that lived from the Early Paleocene (or Late Cretaceous) to the Late Miocene epochs in North America, Eurasia, and Africa. Originally thought to be a single group of animals ancestral to the modern Carnivora, this order is now usually considered a polyphyletic assemblage of two different groups, the oxyaenids and the hyaenodonts, not a natural group. Oxyaenids are first known from the Middle or Late Paleocene of North America, while hyaenodonts hail from the Early Paleocene, or Late Cretaceous, of Europe.

Creodonts were the dominant carnivorous mammals from 55 to 35 million years ago, peaking in diversity and prevalence during the Eocene. The first large, hypercarnivorous mammals appeared with the radiation of the oxyaenids in the late Paleocene. During the Paleogene, "creodont" species were the most abundant terrestrial carnivores in the Old World. In Paleogene Africa, hyaenodonts were the dominant group of large flesh-eaters, persisting until the middle of the Miocene.

"Creodont" groups had an extensive range, both geographically and temporally. They are known from the late Paleocene through the Early Oligocene in North America, the Early Eocene through Middle Miocene in Europe, ^{Including supplementary materials} Late Paleocene through Late Miocene in Asia, and from the Late Paleocene to the Late Miocene in Africa. While most were small-to-medium sized mammals, among their number was Megistotherium and Sarkastodon, both of which were some of the largest terrestrial mammalian hypercarnivores. The last genus, Dissopsalis, went extinct about 7.5 million years ago.

Most modern paleontologists agree both "creodont" families are related to Carnivora, but are not their direct ancestors. It is still unclear how closely the two families are related to each other. In general, classification is complicated by the fact that relationships among fossil mammals are usually decided by similarities in the teeth, but the teeth of hypercarnivorous species may evolve similar shapes through convergent evolution, to deal with the mechanics of eating meat.

"Creodonts" share with the Carnivora, and many other predatory mammal clades, the carnassial shear, a scissors-like modification of upper and lower cheek teeth that was used to slice muscle tissue. This adaptation is also seen in other clades of predatory mammals.

== Systematics and history ==
"Creodonta" was coined by Edward Drinker Cope in 1875. Cope included the oxyaenids and the viverravid Didymictis but omitted the Hyaenodontidae. In 1880, he expanded the term to include families Miacoidea (Miacidae and Viverravidae), Arctocyonidae, Leptictidae (now Pseudorhyncocyonidae), Oxyaenidae, Ambloctonidae and Mesonychidae. Cope originally placed creodonts within the Insectivora. In 1884, however, he regarded them as a basal group from which both carnivorans and insectivorans arose.

Hyaenodontidae was not included among the creodonts until 1909. William Diller Matthew regarded Creodonta as a suborder of order Carnivora, divided in three groups:

- "Inadaptive Creodonta" (Creodonta inadaptiva): a group that includes "Pseudocreodi" (oxyaenids and hyaenodontids) and the mesonychids.
- "Adaptive Creodonta" (Creodonta adaptiva): made up of the miacids and the taxa included in the wastebasket "arctocyonids".
- "Primitive Creodonta" (Creodonta primitiva): made up of Oxyclaenidae.

Over time, various groups and species were removed from this order. It stabilized in the mid-20th century as representing oxyaenids, hyaenodonts, mesonychids, and arctocyonids, which were understood as the major groups of flesh-eating placental mammals that were not members of the Carnivora. Van Valen (1966) removed "arctocyonids" and mesonychids and placed them into Condylarthra. By then, Creodonta contained only the oxyaenids and the hyaenodontids.

More recently, "Creodonta" had been considered to be a nonvalid polyphyletic assemblage of carnivorous placental mammals, with the members members of Creodonta being sister taxa to Carnivoramorpha (carnivorans and their stem-relatives) within clade Pan-Carnivora (in mirorder Ferae). Split in two orders: Oxyaenodonta and Hyaenodonta plus its stem-relatives (genera Altacreodus and Simidectes). Halliday et al. (2015) supported the monophyly of Creodonta, and placed the group as relatives of clade Pholidotamorpha (pangolins and their stem-relatives). However, later studies supported the order being polyphyletic and a closer relation to carnivoramorphs than to pholidotamorphans, with oxyaenids forming a clade with carnivoraforms.

Polly has argued that the only available synapomorphy between oxyaenids and hyaenodontids is a large metastylar blade on the first molar (M1), but he believes that that feature is common for all basal eutheria. Separating Oxyaenidae from Hyaenodontidae would also comport with biogeographic evidence, since the first oxyaenid is known from the North American early Paleocene and the first hyaenodontids are from very late Paleocene of North Africa.

Complicating this arrangement is the tentative endorsement by Gunnell of the erection of a third family, Limnocyonidae. The group includes taxa that were once considered oxyaenids, such as Limnocyon, Thinocyon, and Prolimnocyon. Wortman had even erected a subfamily of Limnocyoninae within the oxyaenids. Van Valen nests the same subfamily (including Oxyaenodon) within Hyaenodontidae. Gunnell is agnostic whether Limnocyonidae is a group within Hyaenodontidae (although a sister group to the rest of hyaenodontids) or entirely separate.

According to Gunnell, the defining features of the oxyaenids include: A small braincase low in the skull. The occiput wide at base and narrowing dorsally (to give it a triangular shape). The lacrimal bone makes a semicircular expansion on the face. The mandibles have heavy symphysis. M1 and m2 form the carnassials, while M3/m3 are absent. The manus and pes are plantigrade or subplantigrade. The fibula articulates with the calcaneum, and the astragalus articulates with the cuboid bone. The phalanges are compressed and fissured at the tip.

Likewise, Gunnell's list of defining features of hyaenodontids includes: Long, narrow skull with a narrow basicranium and a high narrow occiput. The frontal bones are concave between the orbital regions. M2 and m3 form the carnassials. M3 is present in most species, while m3 is always present. Manus and pes range from plantigrade to digitigrade. The fibula articulates with the calcaneum, while the astragalar-cuboid articulation is reduced or absent. Terminal phalanges are compressed and fissured at the tip.

The limnocyonids had the following features according to Gunnell: M3/m3 were reduced or absent, other teeth were unreduced. The rostrum was elongated. The animals themselves were small to medium-sized.

== Morphology ==
=== Size ===
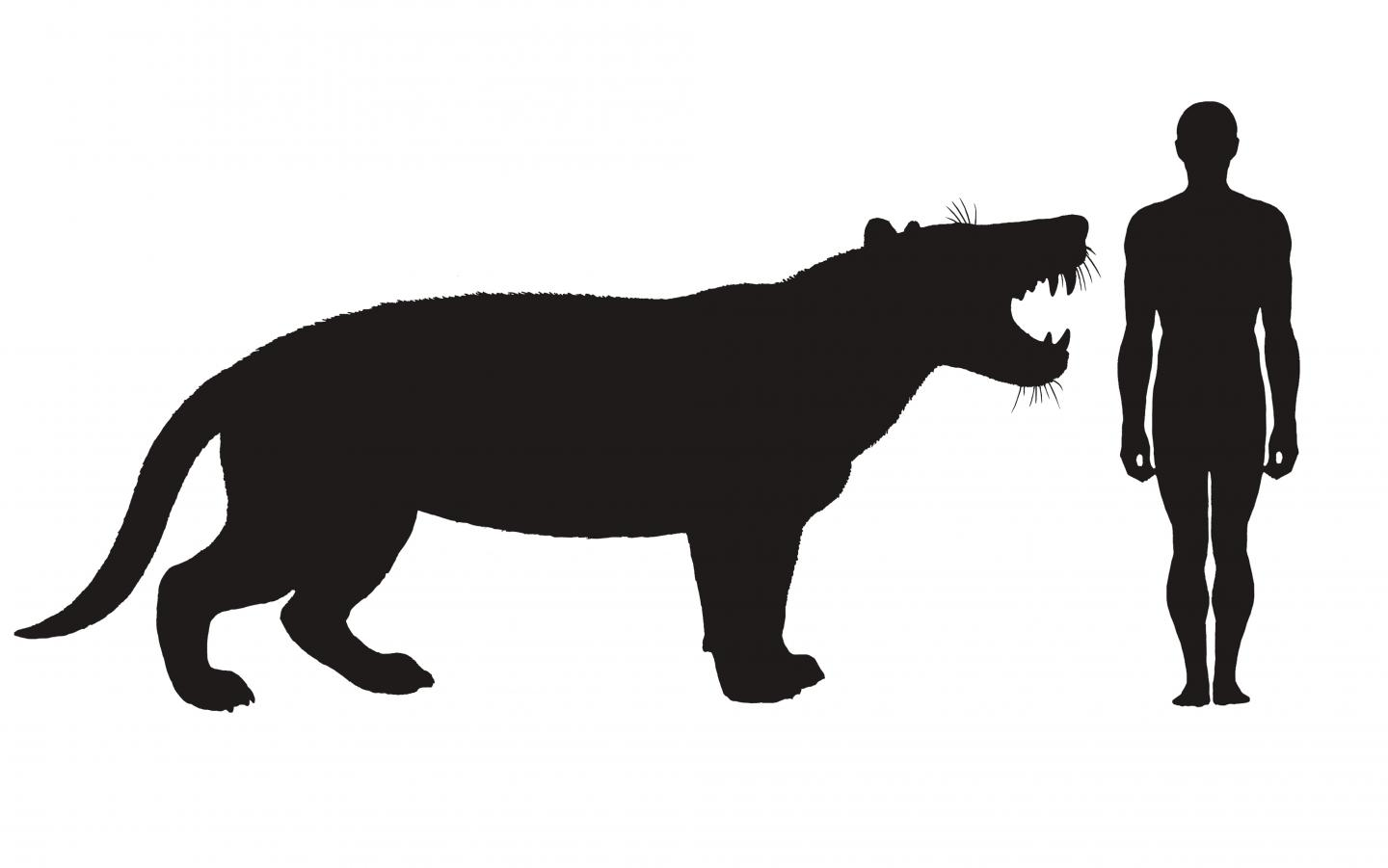
Size comparison between Simbakubwa kutokaafrika and a human

Creodonts ranged in size from the size of weasels to Sarkastodon and large hyainailourines. Sarkastodon dimensions were described as 50% greater than the Patriofelis to which it bore many similarities. Sorkin (2008) study estimated that it could’ve weighed 800 kilograms (1,800 lb), although it may have been an overestimate. The large hyainailourines were presented by Megistotherium, Hyainailouros, and Simbakubwa. The largest North American creodont, was Hemipsalodon grandis, which could’ve weighed 430–760 kilograms (950–1,680 lb).

The larger oxyaenids, however, were not known until late in the Paleocene which saw a radiation of oxyaenids, such as the puma-sized Dipsalidictis and the probably bone-crushing scavenger Dipsalodon. On the other hand, the largest known hyaenodonts didn’t appear until the Early Miocene. Certain creodonts (Arfia, Prolimnocyon and Palaeonictis) seem to have experienced the dwarfing phenomenon during the Paleocene-Eocene Thermal Maximum seen in other mammal genera. A proposed explanation for this phenomenon is that the increased carbon dioxide levels in the atmosphere directly affected carnivores through increased temperature and aridity and also indirectly affected them by reducing the size of their herbivorous prey through the same selective pressures.

=== Dentition ===
Among primitive creodonts the dental formula is 3.1.4.33.1.4.3, but later forms often had reduced numbers of incisors, premolars and/or molars. The canines are always large and pointed. The lateral incisors are large, while the medial incisors are usually small. Premolars are primitive, with one primary cusp and various secondary cusps.

Creodonts have two or three pairs of carnassial teeth. One pair performed the largest cutting function (either M1/m2 or M2/m3). This arrangement is unlike modern carnivorans, which use P4 and m1 for carnassials. This difference suggests convergent evolution among meat-eaters, with a separate evolutionary history and an order-level distinction, given that different teeth evolved as the carnassials both between creodonts and carnivorans, and between oxyaenids and hyaenodonts. Carnassials are also known in other flesh-eating mammal clades, such as in the extinct bat Necromantis, as well as highly unrelated taxa such as the flesh-eating marsupial Thylacoleo.

Different molars were involved in the two major groups of creodonts. In the Oxyaenidae, M1 and m2 that form the carnassials. Among the hyaenodontids, it is M2 and m3. Unlike most modern carnivorans, in which the carnassials are the sole shearing teeth, other creodont molars have a subordinate shearing functions. The difference in which teeth form the carnassials is a major argument for the polyphyly of Creodonta.

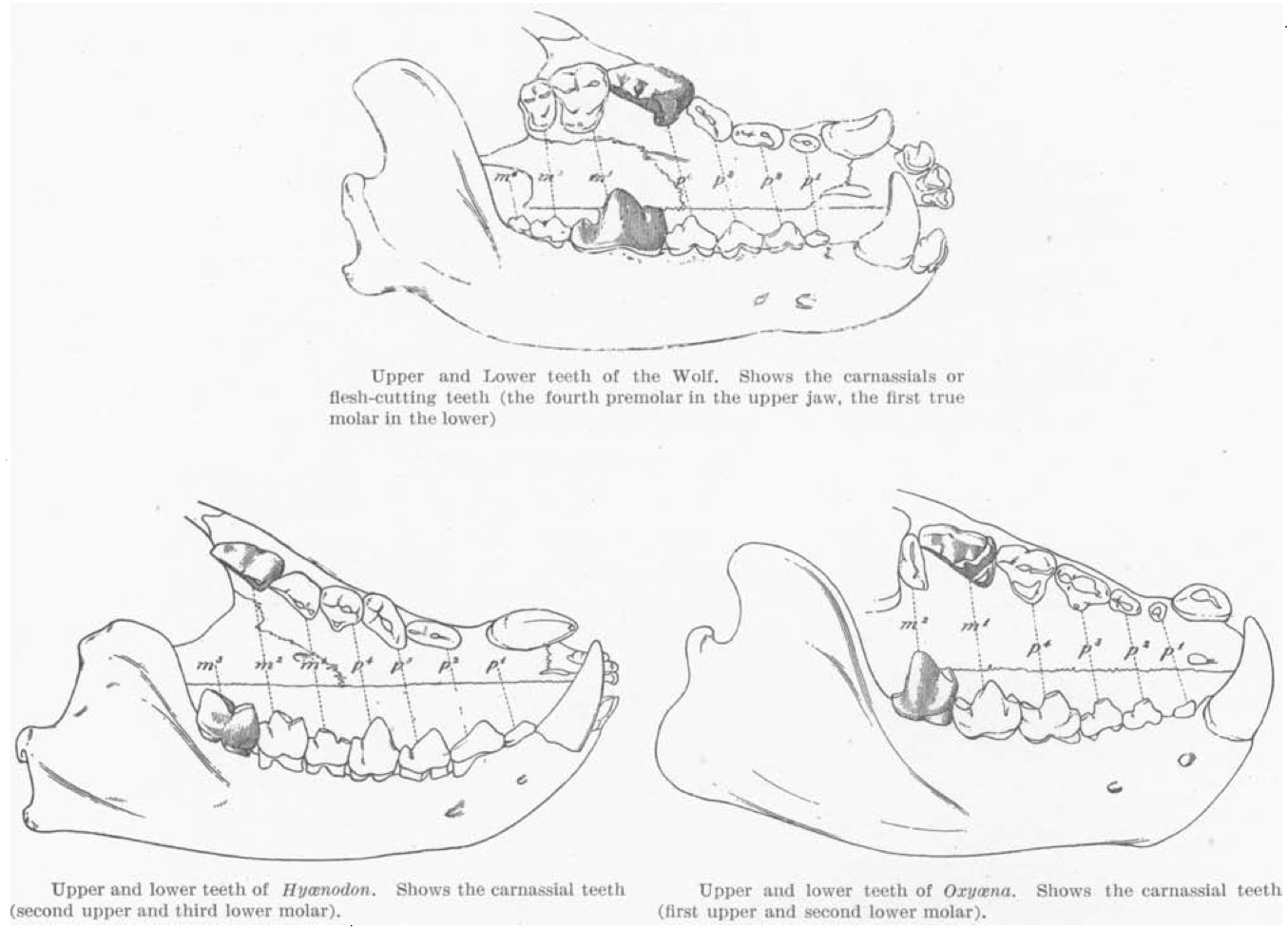
Comparison of carnassial teeth of wolf and typical hyaenodontid and oxyaenid

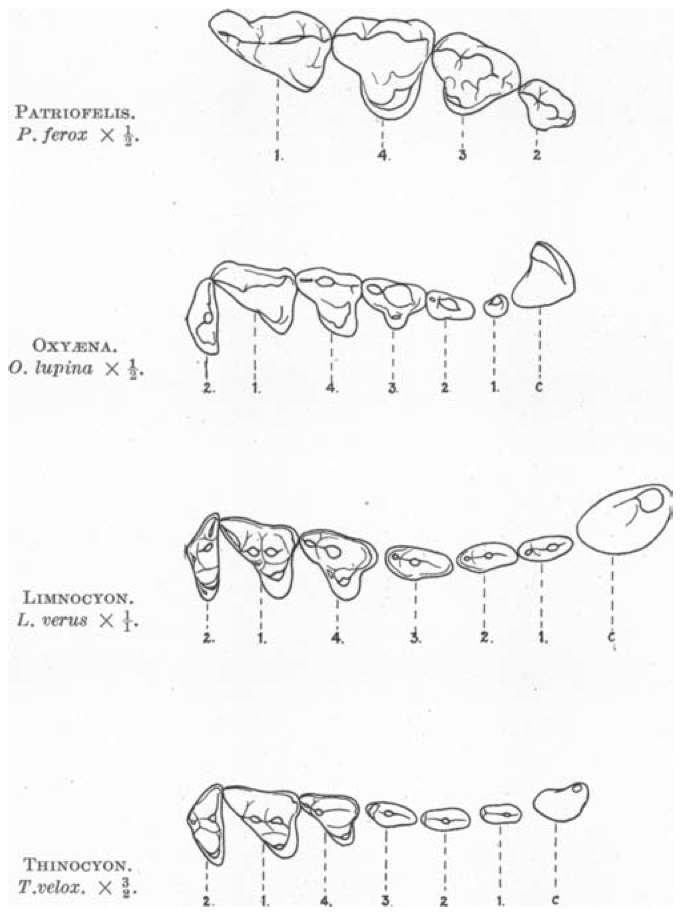
Upper teeth of creodonts from Middle Eocene Bridger Basin, Wyoming

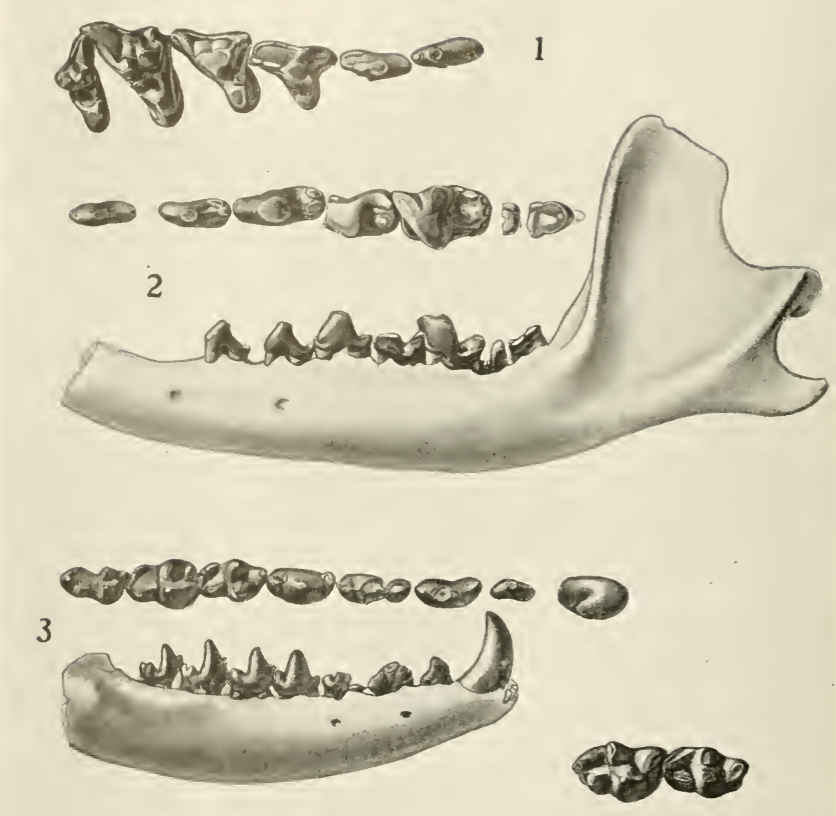
Sinopa fossils: (1) Right upper cheek teeth, P2-M2; (2) Left ramus of mandible (p2-m2); (3) Right ramus of mandible (c-m2)

=== Cranium ===
Creodonts had long, narrow skulls with small brains. The skull narrowed considerably behind the eyes, producing a distinct splanchnocranium and neurocranium segments of the cranium. They had large sagittal crests and usually broad mastoids (which were probably derived features for the group). Many creodonts had proportionately large heads. In basal forms, the auditory bullae was not ossified. Generally the temporal fossae were very broad.

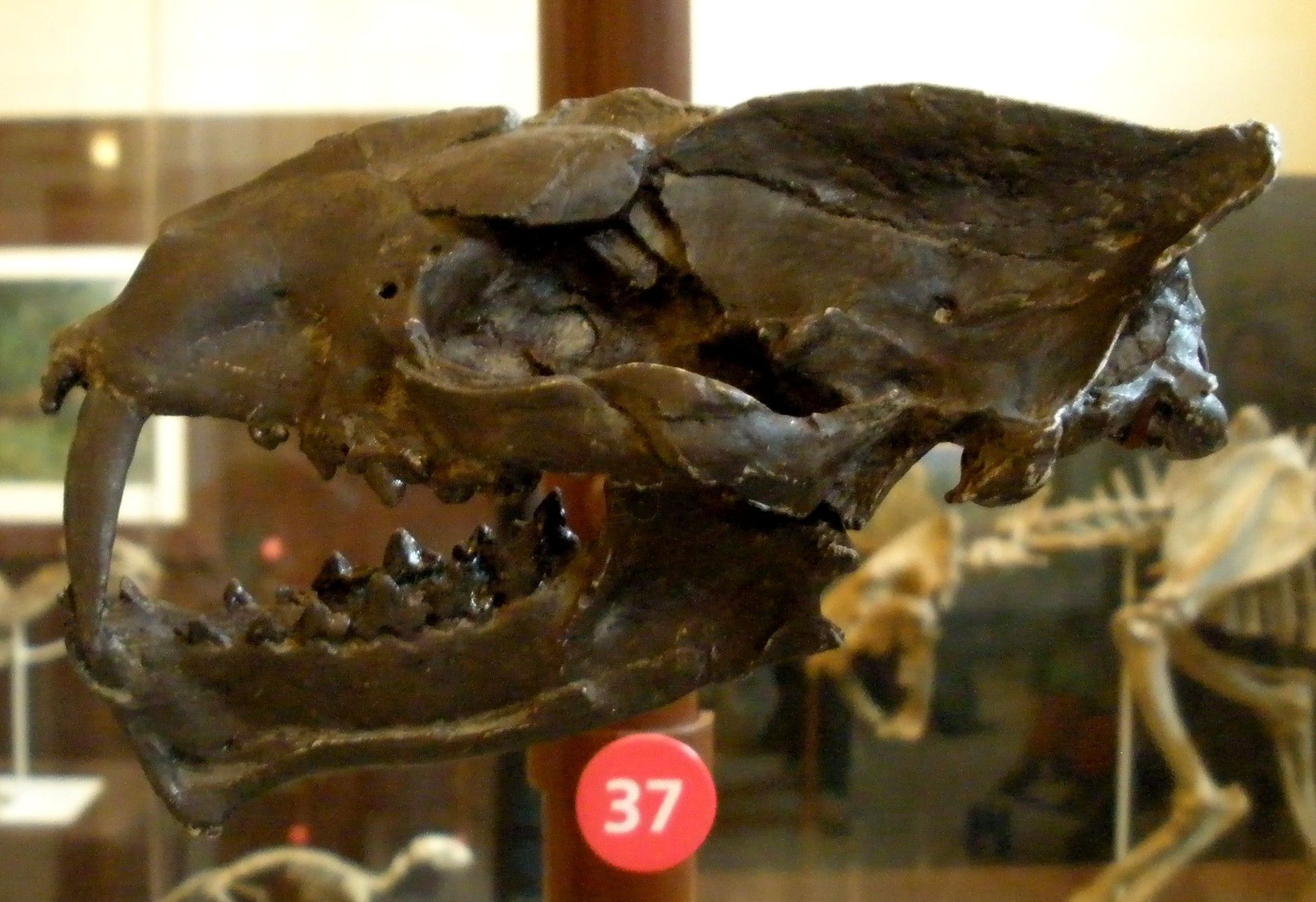
Skull of oxyaenid Machaeroides eothen

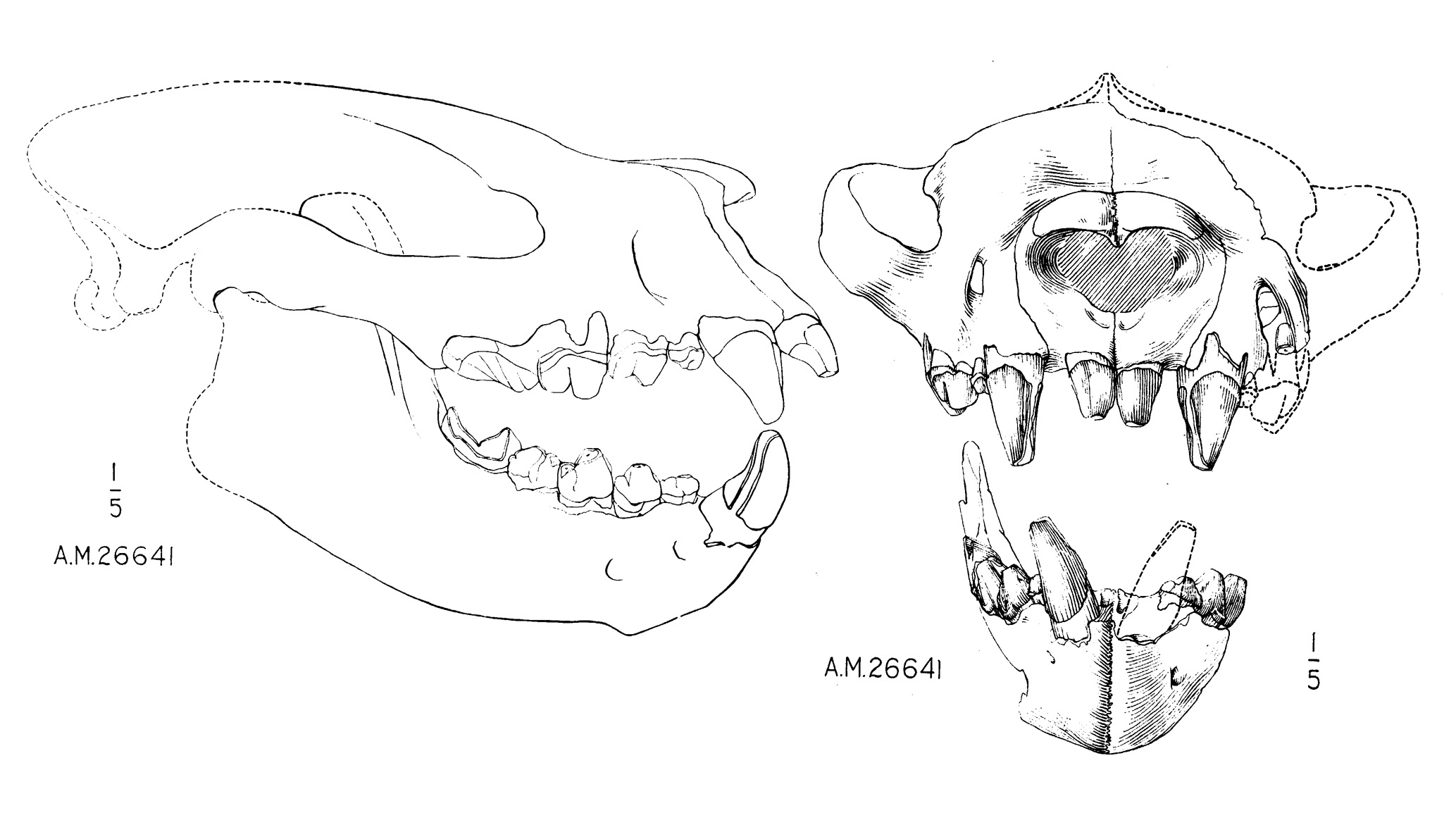
Lateral outline and front view of skull of Sarkastodon mongoliensis

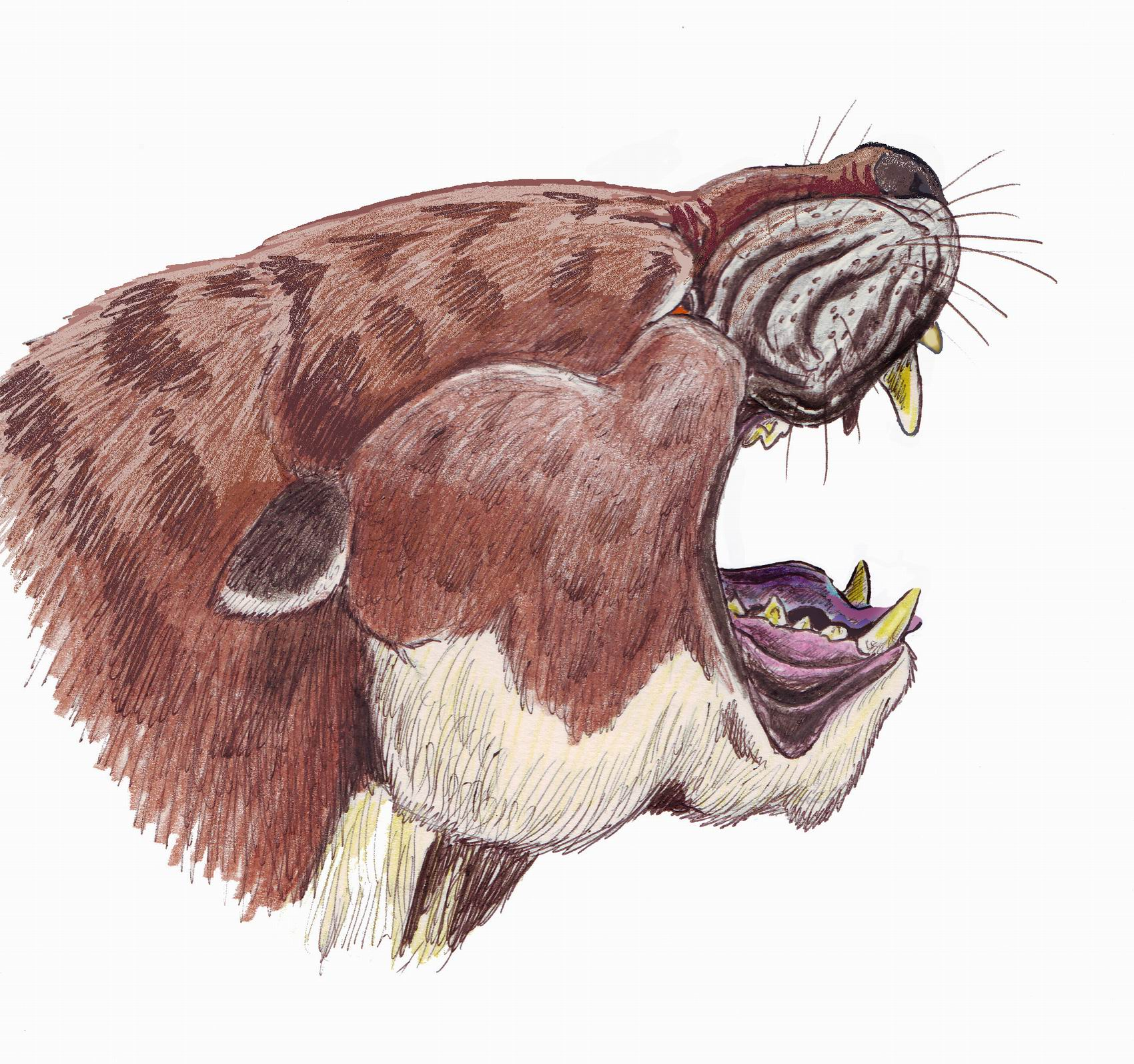
Head of Sarkastodon mongoliensis

Lateral (A) and dorsal (B) views of the skull of the hyaenodontid Apterodon macrognathus by Henry Fairfield Osborn

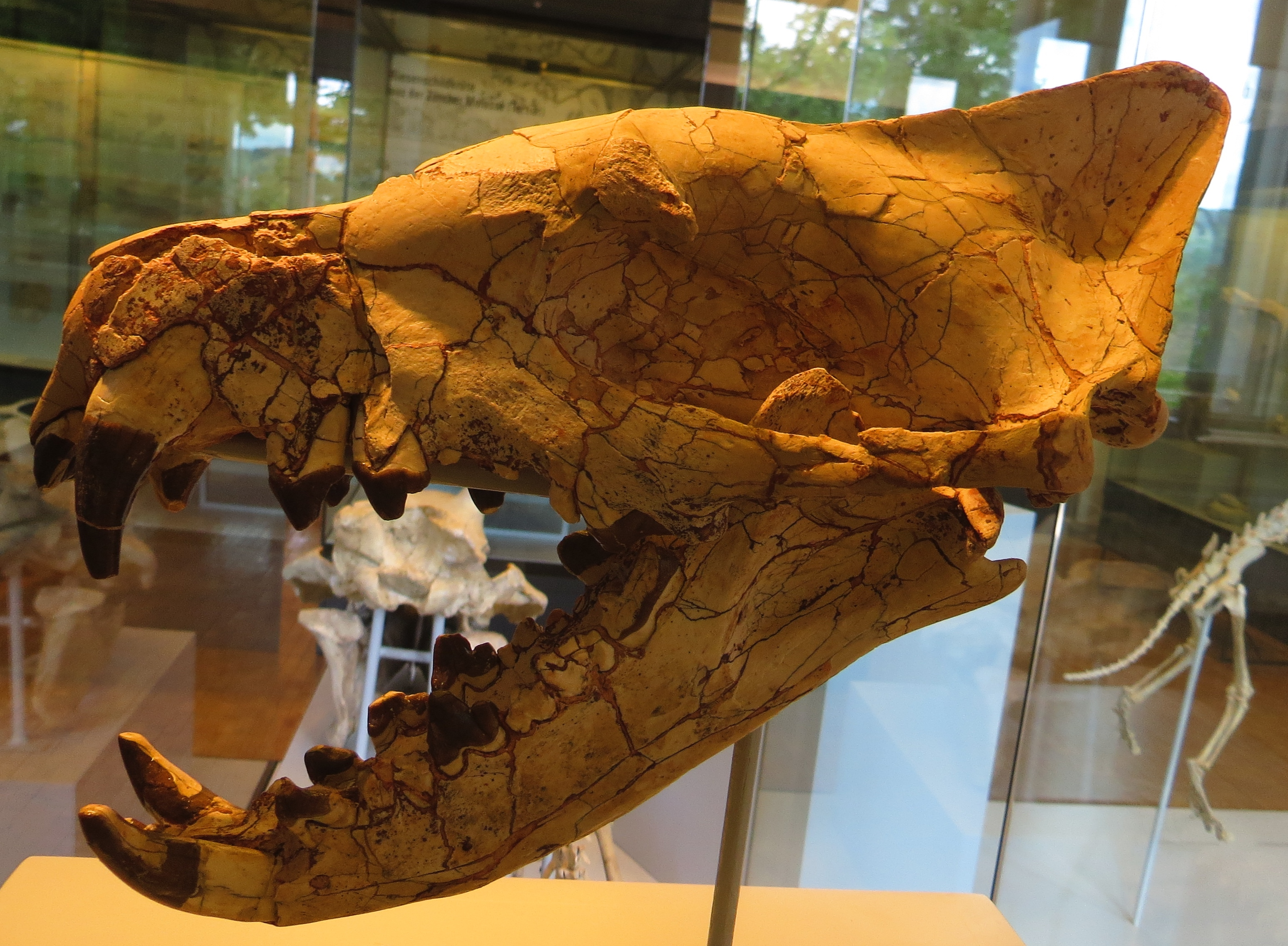
Skull of Hyaenodon horridus

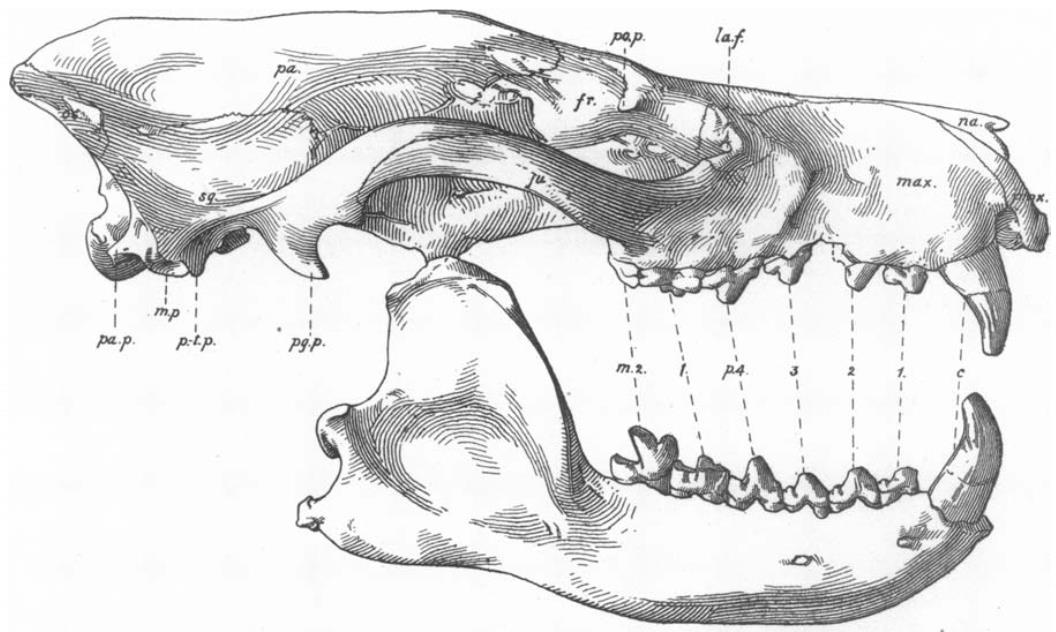
Skull of Limnocyon verus

=== Postcranial skeleton ===
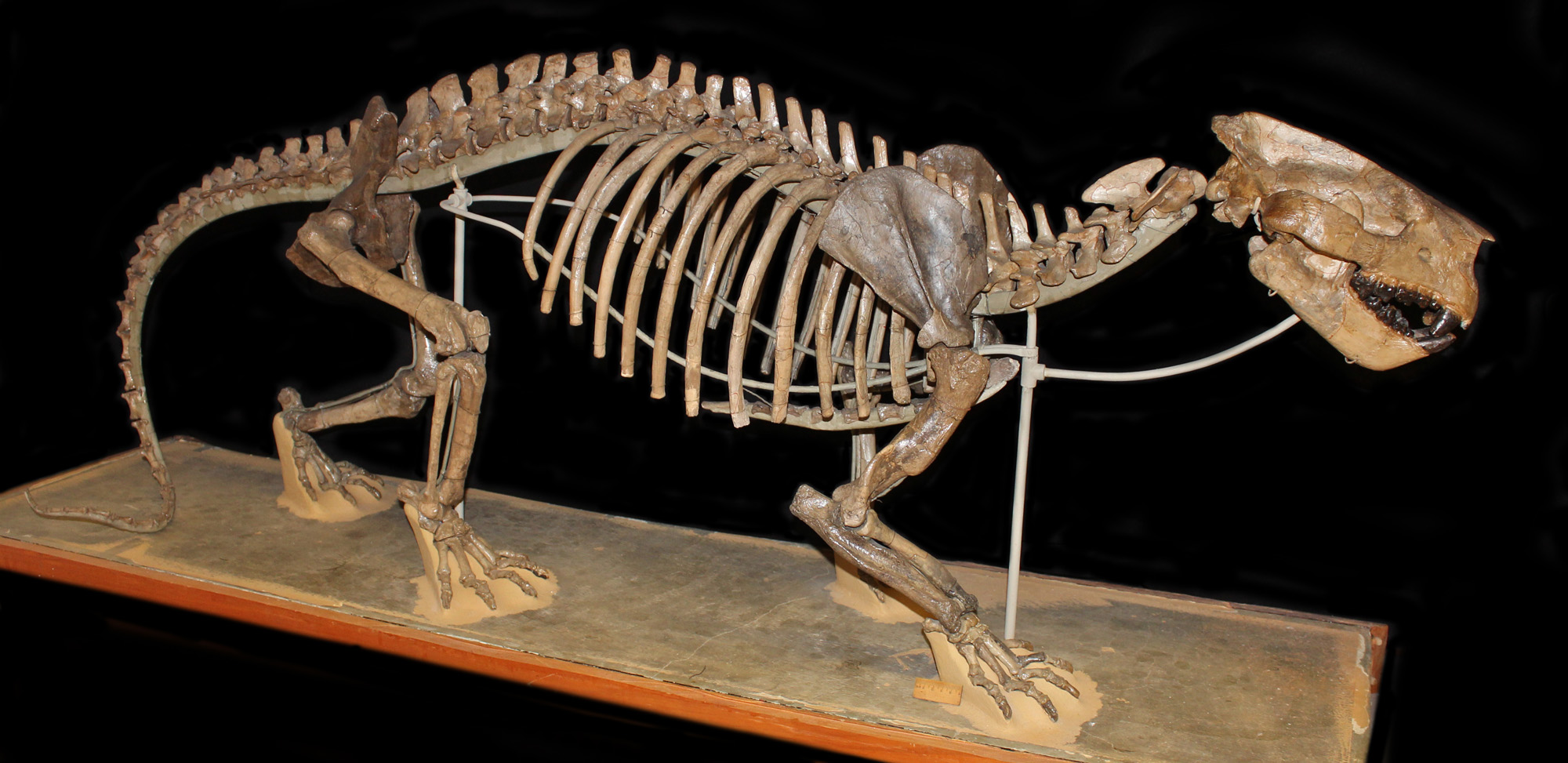
Mount of oxyaenid Patriofelis ferox from the American Museum of Natural History

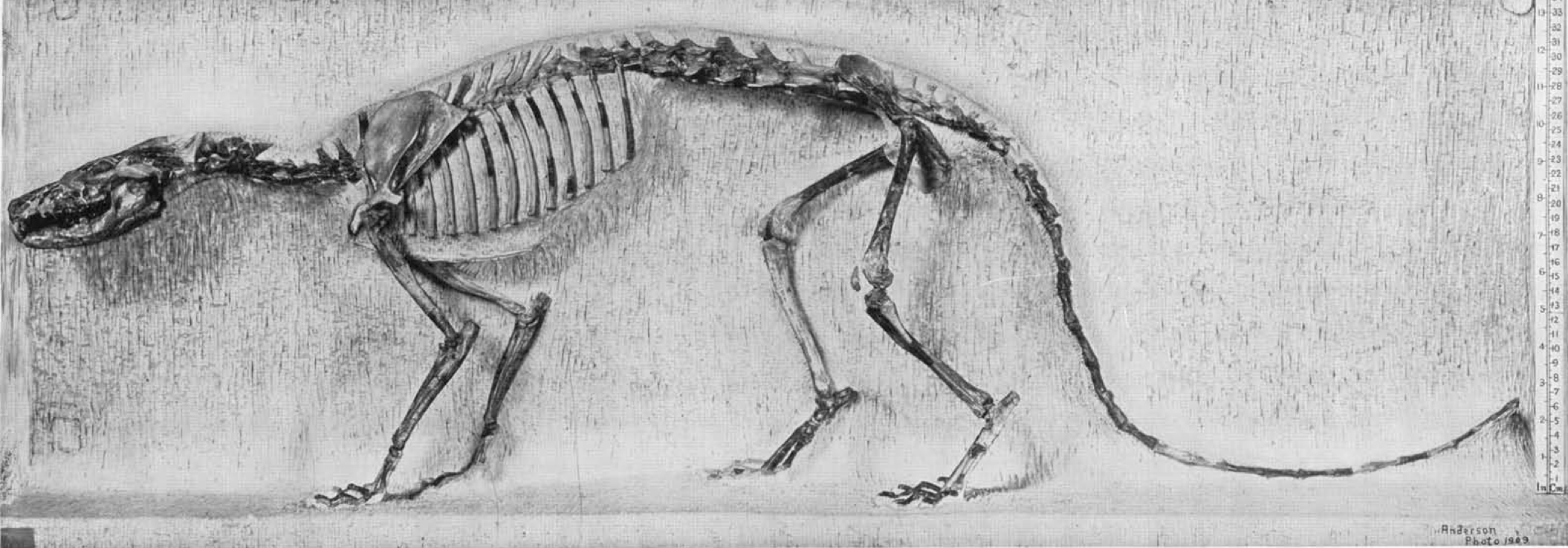
Mounted skeleton of the hyaenodontid Sinopa rapax from Bridger Basin

Creodonts had generalized postcranial skeletons. Their limbs were mesaxonic (with the axis of the foot provided by the middle of their five digits). The terminal phalanges were fused claws. Regressions of the humeri found Oxyaena and Patriofelis had more robust humeri than any felid. Creodonts have been noted to have revolute zygapophyses, interlocking lumbar vertebrae, which stabilizes it against shear forces and dislocations.

== Paleobiology ==
=== Locomotion ===
Hyaenodonts showed transition from plantigrade to digitigrade throughout their evolutionary history. Several hyaenodonts, such as some species of Hyaenodon and Oxyaenoides, were thought to have been cursorial predators.

=== Diet ===
Early creodonts (both oxyaenids and hyaenodonts) displayed the tribosphenic molars common for basal therians. Small forms had somewhat strong postmetacrista-metastellar crests suggesting that they were probably opportunistic feeders, eating such things as eggs, birds, small mammals, insects and possibly plant matter as well, possibly like extant viverrids. Chewing analysis found Lesmesodon likely had a insectivorous-carnivorous diet. Larger forms had greater shearing capacity and the capacity increased over time. Arfia, one of the most common carnivorous mammals in early Eocene North America, developed a more open trigonid on M3 over the course of the Early Eocene, increasing the shearing ability of the carnassials. A similar development can be seen by comparing Oxyaena, Prototomus and Limnocyon with the smaller, more generalized feeders among the creodonts. Pakakali and Anasinopa were considered to be mesocarnivorous.

Some of the last oxyaenids, such as Patriofelis and Machaeroidinae, showed extreme adaptations towards hypercarnivory. Similarly, some of the youngest hyaenodonts in the Miocene, have shown extreme specialization towards hypercarnivory. Hunter-Schreger bands observed in the tooth enamel of various creodonts revealed that among hyaenodonts, Hyaenodon horridus, Hyainailouros, and Pterodon were zigzag bands, suggesting that these predators were osteophagous. Whereas those of Hyaenodon brevirostris and Hyaenodon mustelinus transition from undulating at the base of the tooth to zigzag at the tip, indicating that these species were not as well adapted for feeding on bone. Among oxyaenids, Patriofelis and Sarkastodon were found to have an osteophagous diet.

== Extinction ==
Creodonts began to decline diversity in North America during the Bridgerian-Uintan faunal stage. The last oxyaenids went extinct 41.5 Ma during the Middle Eocene. Some experts suggested their extinction was due to competition with nimravids, however other experts disagree with this hypothesis. The excellent fossil records within North America show that oxyaenids were declining prior to the appearance of replacement taxa such as nimravids. In addition, the last records of machaeroidines predate the earliest records of nimravids in North America. Instead, climatic changes towards the late Eocene played a role in their extinction, as during the towards the late Eocene the climate of the planet began to cooling, resulting in more arid, open environments. Because of their low mobility, oxyaenids went extinct because they weren’t adapted towards the temperate, open forest habitats.

By the Late Eocene, creodont diversity was only 6% of what it was during the Early Eocene in North America and by the Oligocene North American creodonts were presented by a few species of Hyaenodon before going extinct 28 Ma. In Western Europe, oxyaenids would go extinct during the Intra-Ypresian Mammal Turnover event, which coincided with a cooling period following the Paleocene-Eocene Thermal Maximum. European hyaenodonts persisted through the turnover, but experienced a major drop in diversity during Grand Coupure, a faunal turnover that was contemporary with the global Eocene-Oligocene extinction event. The Eocene-Oligocene extinction event correlates with abrupt shift towards a icehouse world, which stems from the expansion of the Antarctic ice sheets and saw sea level decline by 70 m (230 ft). Grande Coupure saw an extinction rate of 60% of western European mammalian lineages, which were replaced by Asian faunal immigrants. This included the arrival of carnivorans from Asia such as later amphicyonids, amphicynodontids, nimravids, and ursids which deprised into Western Europe via new land connection with Asia following the receding of the Turgai Strait. The turnover saw the extinction of European hyainailourines and proviverrines, as well as a notable decline in hyaenodontines. During the Miocene, Afro-Arabian hyaenodonts experienced a massive decline after the early Miocene and went extinct by the late Miocene.

Many experts have argued that the extinction of hyaenodonts was due to competition with carnivorans. Lang et al. (2021) suggested carnivorans may have played a role in their extinction of hyaenodonts due to the adaptive potential of their carnassials. In North America, Friscia and Valkenburgh (2010) argued that carnivorans may have limited the evolution of creodonts, resulting with only the large, hypercarnivorous ecomorphs remaining. They also note the size increase among carnivorans throughout the Eocene, reaching the body sizes of hyaenodonts during the Oligocene. Serio et al. (2024) found that North American creodont disparity showed a degree of morphological differentiations until the middle Eocene, when disparity from carnivorans increased. They argued this suggests that carnivorans competitively replaced hyaenodonts.

Lange-Badré (1979) suggested the decline of the proviverrines coincided with the arrival of carnivorans, hyaenodontines, and hyainailourines. Within the same paper, they hypothesized that Pterodon went extinct due to the climatic cooling and competition from the arriving carnivorans. Within Afro-Arabia, Borths et al. (2017) hypothesized hyaenodonts may have been displaced within the mesocarnivorous niche which forced them to specialize in hypercarnivory, as some of the smallest Miocene hyaenodonts showed extreme specializations towards hypercarnivory. Borths and Stevens (2019) suggested that large hyainailourines may have gone extinct because of loss of diversity of large herbivores and competition with gregarious carnivorans that had larger, more complex brains, which made them more adept for stealing carcasses from the hyainailourines.

However, this hypothesis has been questioned by experts. The discovery of Simbakubwa suggests that their large size was due to changes in the herbivore fauna rather than competition with carnivorans. Additionally, overall brain sizes have little to no correlation in the sociality of carnivorans.

In Europe, Hyaenodon and amphicyonids niche partitioned by preferring different habitats, with the former hunting in more closed environments. Solé et al. (2022) found no evidence of competitive replacement by carnivoranforms have been found in Europe as hyaenodonts were more diverse than carnivoraforms until the Grand Coupure. They also found the carnivorous fauna transition was gradual as proviverrines and hyainailourines went extinct during disappeared MP19-20, while newcomers appeared MP21. Furthermore, body mass dynamics of European hyaenodonts and carnivoramorphans found hyaenodonts didn't experience a decrease in body mass when the body mass of carnivoramorphans increased suggesting a notable niche partition between the two clades. Instead, it’s now thought that hyaenodonts in Europe died out because of climatic changes instead of competition with carnivorans. Christison et al. (2021) conducted a study on carnivoran and hyaenodont dietary niches in the Cypress Hills Formation. Their results showed that only the smallest hyaenodonts in the faunal assemblage had any significant dietary overlap with smaller carnivorans, while larger carnivorans and hyaenodonts were extremely distinct from one another, with the study concluding that it was highly unlikely that the extinction of hyaenodonts in North America can be attributed to competition with carnivorans. Instead, they argued the extinction of hyaenodonts may have been because of the preferences of large prey, such as brontotheres, in addition to the inability to adapt to more open environments due to their relatively short legs.
