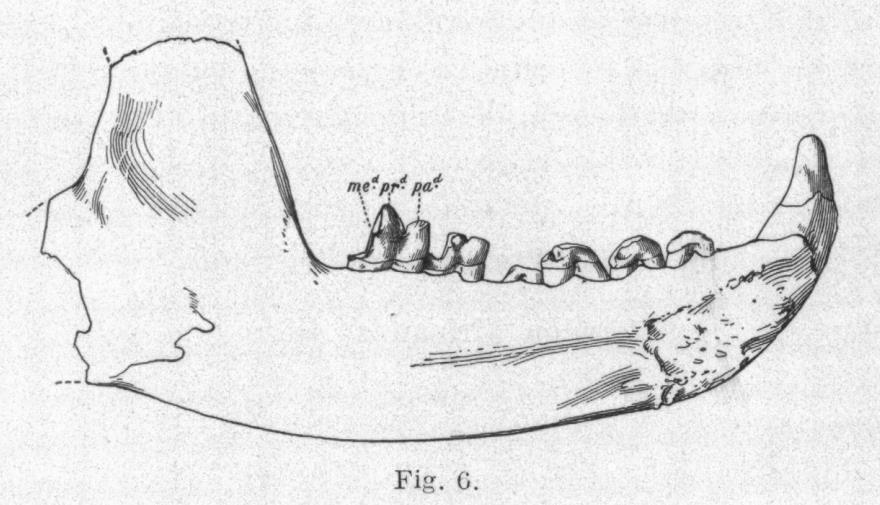
- lower jaw of Metasinopa fraasii

Scientific classification
- Kingdom: Animalia
- Phylum: Chordata
- Class: Mammalia
- Order: †Hyaenodonta
- Superfamily: †Hyainailouroidea
- Family: †Teratodontidae
- Subfamily: †Teratodontinae
- Genus: †Metasinopa; Osborn, 1909

Type species
- †Metasinopa fraasi Osborn, 1909

Species
- †M. ethiopica (Andrews, 1906); †M. fraasi (Osborn, 1909); †M. osborni (Holroyd, 1994); †M. sp. [DPC 4544 & DPC 10199] (Matthew, 2017)

Synonyms
- synonyms of species: M. ethiopica: Brychotherium ethiopica (Holroyd, 1994); Sinopa aethiopica (Hopwood & Hollyfield, 1954); Sinopa ethiopica (Andrews, 1906)

= Metasinopa =

Metasinopa Temporal range: 33.9–30.0 Ma Early Oligocene

Extinct genus of mammals

Metasinopa ("next to Sinopa") is an extinct genus of hyaenodonts from extinct family Teratodontidae that lived during the early Oligocene in Egypt (northern Africa).

== Taxonomy ==
Although Metasinopa fraasi is the only unambiguous species of the genus, the early Miocene species Metasinopa napaki from Uganda was originally assigned to Metasinopa by Savage (1965), but was later moved to Paracynohyaenodon by van Valen (1967), and is now assigned to the Miocene Anasinopa, as A. napaki. "Sinopa" ethiopica has been assigned to Metasinopa following Savage (1965), but may be its own genus considering its younger age relative to M. fraasi.
