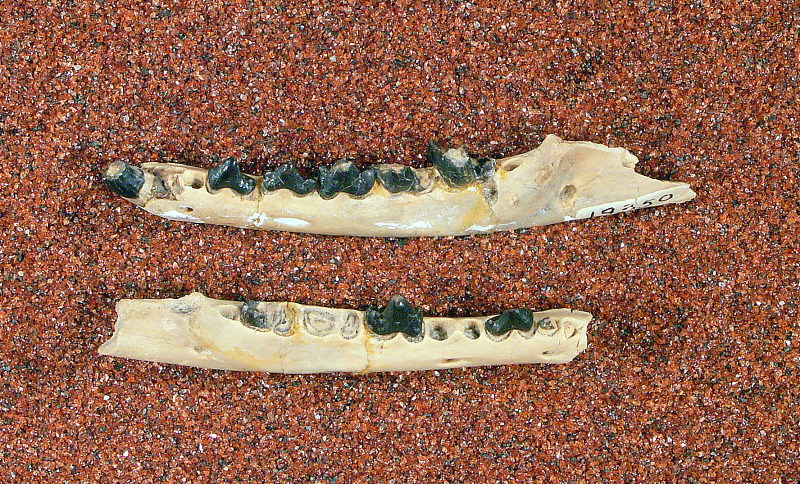
- lower jaw of Prolimnocyon antiquus

Scientific classification
- Kingdom: Animalia
- Phylum: Chordata
- Class: Mammalia
- Order: †Hyaenodonta
- Clade: †Limnocyoninae
- Genus: †Prolimnocyon; Matthew, 1915

Type species
- †Prolimnocyon atavus Matthew, 1915

Species
- †P. antiquus (Matthew & Granger, 1915); †P. atavus (Matthew & Granger, 1915); †P. chowi (Meng, 1998); †P. eerius (Gingerich, 1989); †P. haematus (Gingerich & Deutsch, 1989); †P. sp. [South Pass, Green River Basin, Wyoming] (Muldoon, 2018)

Synonyms
- synonyms of species: P. antiquus: Prolimnocyon elisabethae (Gazin, 1952)

= Prolimnocyon =

Prolimnocyon Temporal range: 57.0–49.2 Ma late Paleocene to middle Eocene

Extinct family of mammals

Prolimnocyon ("before Limnocyon") is an extinct paraphyletic genus of limnocyonin hyaenodonts that lived in Asia and North America during the Late Paleocene to Middle Eocene. Prolimnocyon chowi is one of the earliest known member of the order Hyaenodonta and clade Limnocyoninae.

== Palaeobiology ==
=== Locomotion ===
Prolimnocyon atavus was well adapted for scansorial locomotion. Its hindlimbs contained adaptations such as a cuboid was characterised by a helical proximal cuboid facet, a talus possessing a flattened talar trochlea with a high lateral rim, and a medially projecting lesser trochanter on its femur. On its forelimbs, its humerus had a prominent deltopectoral crest and a reduced greater tubercle, while its radius possessed an ovoid radial head, and its ulna had a radial notch that was oriented laterally. The species also possessed ungual phalanges that were laterally compressed and moderately deep.
