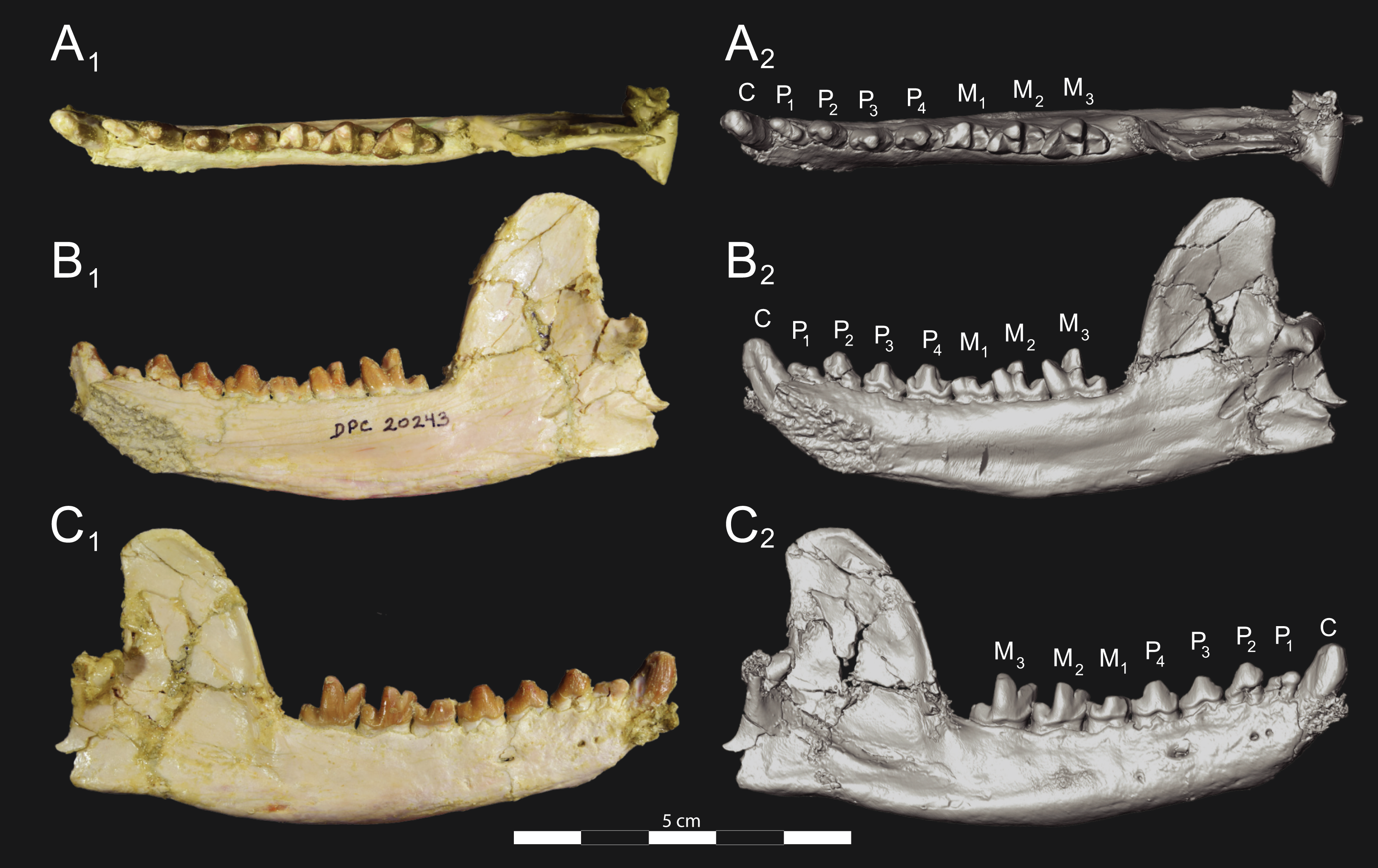
- lower jaw of Brychotherium ephalmos
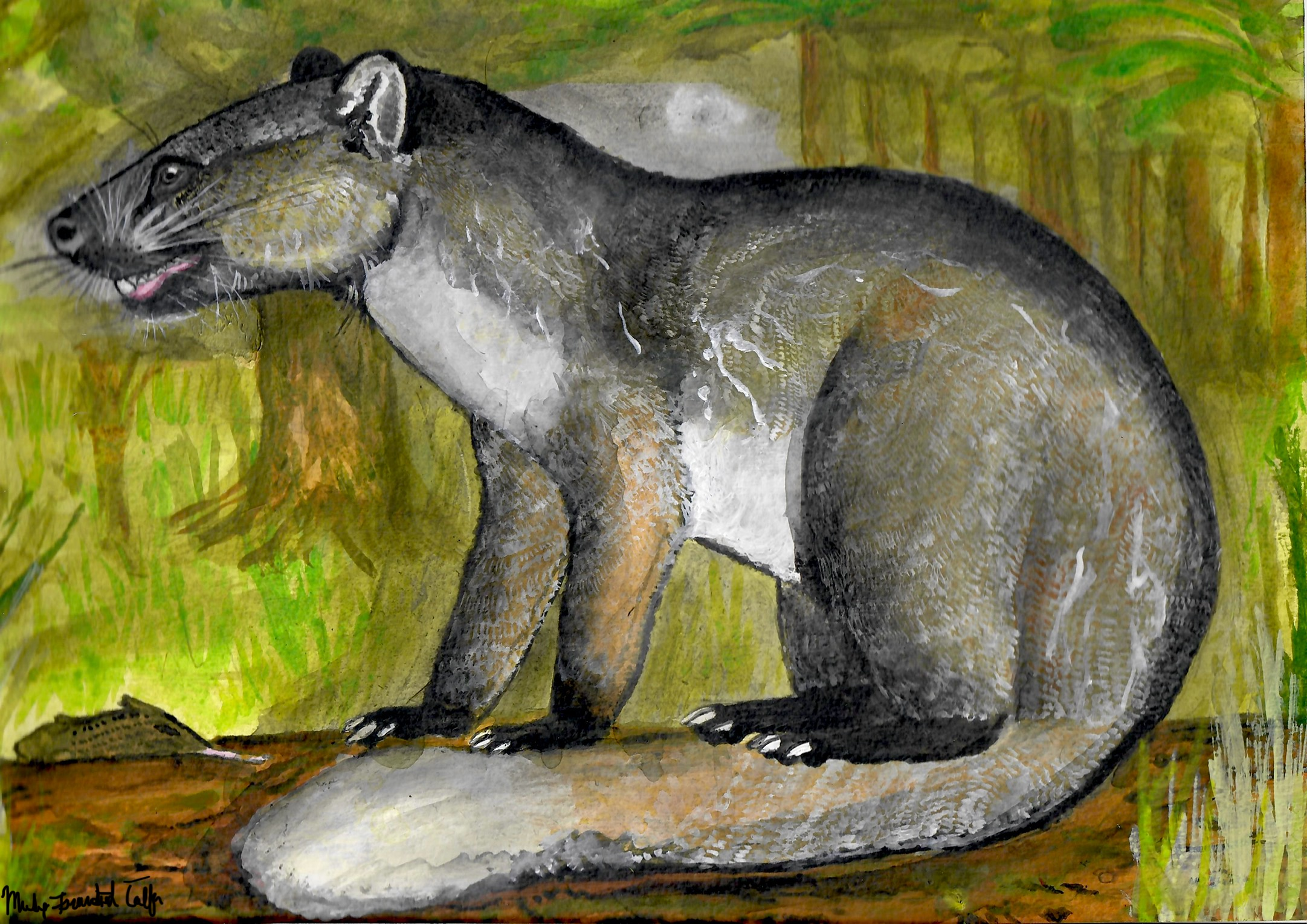
- Life reconstruction of Masrasector nananubis

Scientific classification
- Kingdom: Animalia
- Phylum: Chordata
- Class: Mammalia
- Order: †Hyaenodonta
- Superfamily: †Hyainailouroidea
- Family: †Teratodontidae; Savage, 1965
- Subfamily: †Teratodontinae; Savage, 1965

Type genus
- †Teratodon Savage, 1965

Genera
- [see text]

= Teratodontidae =

Teratodontidae Temporal range: Middle Eocene - Late Miocene 49.3–7.5 Ma

Extinct family of mammals

Teratodontidae ("monstrous teeth") is a family of extinct predatory mammals within the polyphyletic superfamily Hyainailouroidea within extinct order Hyaenodonta.

== Distribution ==
Fossil remains of these mammals are known from Middle Eocene to Late Miocene deposits in Africa and Asia. Teratodontids are primarily known from Afro-Arabia, but a few are known from South Asia.

== Etymology ==
The name of the family translates as "monstrous teeth" (from Ancient Greek τέρας (téras) 'monster', from Ancient Greek ὀδών (odon) 'tooth' and taxonomic suffix "-idae".

== Classification and phylogeny ==
=== Taxonomy ===
- Family: †Teratodontinae (Savage, 1965)
  - Subfamily: †Teratodontinae (Savage, 1965)
    - Genus: †Anasinopa (Savage, 1965)
      - †Anasinopa haasi (Tchernov, 1987)
      - †Anasinopa leakeyi (Savage, 1965)
      - †Anasinopa libyca (Morales, Brewer & Pickford, 2010)
      - †Anasinopa napaki (Savage 1965)
    - Genus: †Brychotherium (Borths, 2016)
      - †Brychotherium atrox (Holroyd, 1994, nomen nudum; sometimes listed as Sinopa atrox)
      - †Brychotherium ephalmos (Borths, 2016)
    - Genus: †Masrasector (Simons & Gingerich, 1974)
      - †Masrasector aegypticum (Simons & Gingerich, 1974)
      - †Masrasector ligabuei (Crochet, 1990)
      - †Masrasector nananubis (Borths & Seiffert, 2017)
      - †Masrasector pithecodacos (Holroyd, 1994)
    - Genus: †Metasinopa (Osborn, 1909)
      - †Metasinopa ethiopica (Andrews, 1906)
      - †Metasinopa fraasii (Osborn, 1909)
      - †Metasinopa osborni (Holroyd, 1994)
      - †Metasinopa sp. [DPC 4544 & DPC 10199] (Matthew, 2017)
    - Tribe: †Dissopsalini (Morales & Pickford, 2017)
      - Genus: †Buhakia (Morlo, 2007)
        - †Buhakia hyaenoides (Morales, 2003)
        - †Buhakia moghraensis (Morlo, 2007)
        - †Buhakia sp. I [Karungu, Kenya] (Savage, 1965)
        - †Buhakia sp. II [GSN GT VI 22'17] (Morales & Pickford, 2017)
      - Genus: †Dissopsalis (Pilgrim, 1910)
        - †Dissopsalis carnifex (Pilgrim, 1910)
        - †Dissopsalis pyroclasticus (Savage, 1965)
    - Tribe: †Teratodontini (Savage, 1965)
      - Genus: †Teratodon (Savage, 1965)
        - †Teratodon enigmae (Savage, 1965)
        - †Teratodon spekei (Savage, 1965)
        - †Teratodon sp. [DPC 8999] (Morlo, 2007)
    - Incertae sedis:
      - †Teratodontinae sp. [BC 2'08] (Pickford, 2008)
      - †Teratodontinae sp. [CBI-1-614] (Solé, 2016)
      - †Teratodontinae sp. [Locality BQ-2, Fayum, Egypt] (Al-Ashqar, 2023)
