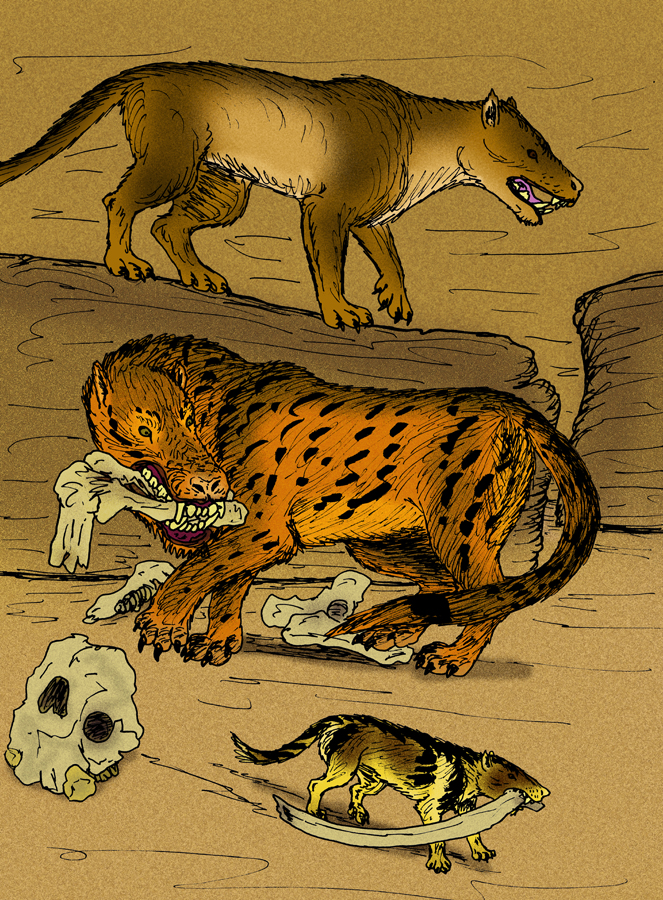
- Comparison of various Early to Middle Miocene hyaenodonts, including the hyainailurids Hyainailouros sulzeri (top) and Megistotherium osteothlastes (center), and teratodontid Dissopsalis carnifex (bottom)

Scientific classification
- Kingdom: Animalia
- Phylum: Chordata
- Class: Mammalia
- Order: †Hyaenodonta
- Superfamily: †Hyainailouroidea
- Family: †Teratodontidae
- Subfamily: †Teratodontinae
- Tribe: †Dissopsalini; Morales & Pickford, 2017

Type genus
- †Dissopsalis Pilgrim, 1910

Genera
- †Buhakia; †Dissopsalis

= Dissopsalini =

Dissopsalini Temporal range: Early—Late Miocene, 20.0–10 Ma

Extinct tribe of mammals

Dissopsalini ("double scissors") is an extinct tribe of hyaenodonts from extinct family Teratodontidae. Fossil remains of these mammals are known from early to late Miocene deposits in Asia and Africa.

== Etymology ==
The name of the family translates as "monstrous teeth" (from Ancient Greek τέρας (téras) 'monster', from Ancient Greek ὀδών (odon) 'tooth' and taxonomic suffix "-idae".

== Classification and phylogeny ==
=== Taxonomy ===
- Tribe: †Dissopsalini (Morales & Pickford, 2017)
  - Genus: †Buhakia (Morlo, 2007)
    - †Buhakia hyaenoides (Morales, 2003)
    - †Buhakia moghraensis (Morlo, 2007)
    - †Buhakia sp. I [Karungu, Kenya] (Savage, 1965)
    - †Buhakia sp. II [GSN GT VI 22’17] (Morales & Pickford, 2017)
  - Genus: †Dissopsalis (Pilgrim, 1910)
    - †Dissopsalis carnifex (Pilgrim, 1910)
    - †Dissopsalis pyroclasticus (Savage, 1965)

== See also ==
- Mammal classification
- Teratodontidae
- Hyaenodonta
