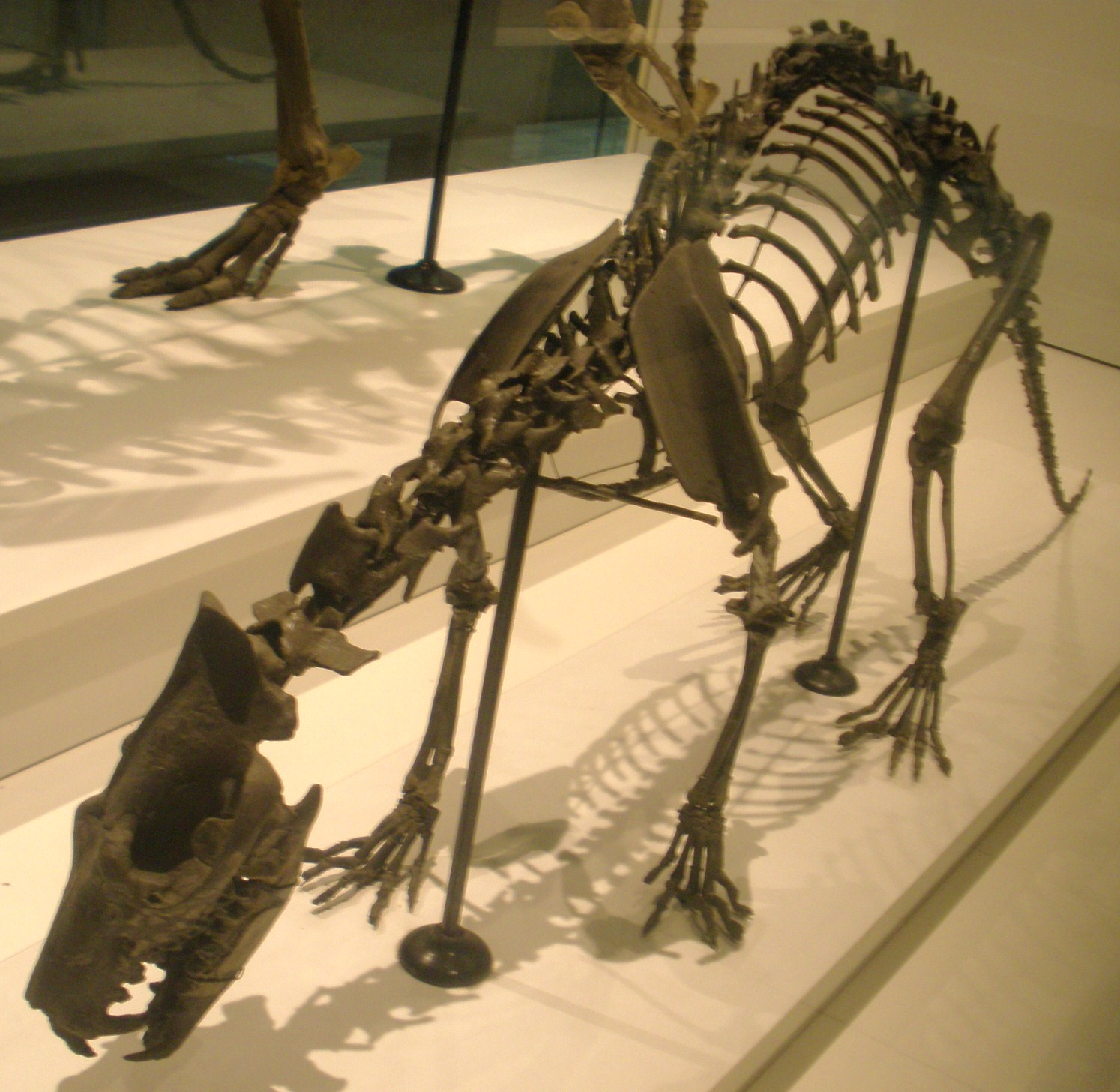
- Skeleton of Sinopa major
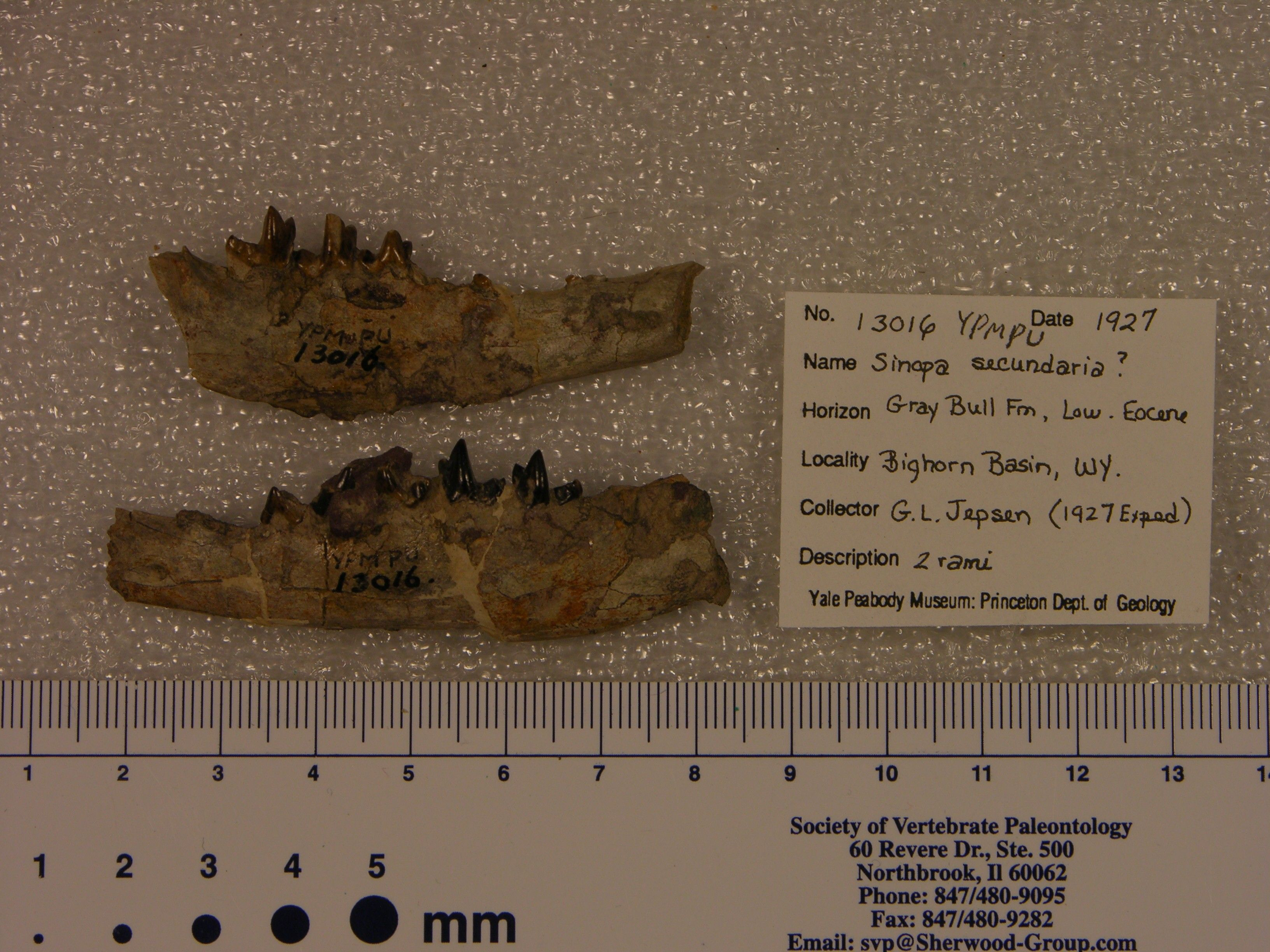
- lower jaw of Prototomus secundarius

Scientific classification
- Kingdom: Animalia
- Phylum: Chordata
- Class: Mammalia
- Order: †Hyaenodonta
- Superfamily: †Limnocyonoidea
- Clade: †Sinopinae; Solé, 2013

Type genus
- †Sinopa Leidy, 1871

Genera
- [see classification]

Synonyms
- list of synonyms: Prototomidae (Morlo, 2014); Sinopaninae (Solé, 2013); Sinopainae (Solé, 2014); Stypolophinae (Trouessart, 1885)

= Sinopinae =

Sinopinae Temporal range: Early to Middle Eocene, 56.0–39.7 Ma

Extinct clade of mammals

Sinopinae ("swift foxes") is an extinct clade of predatory placental mammals from extinct order Hyaenodonta. Fossil remains of these mammals are known from early to middle Eocene deposits in North America and Eurasia.

== Classification and phylogeny ==
=== Taxonomy ===
- Clade: †Sinopinae (Solé, 2013)
  - Genus: †Acarictis (Gingerich & Deutsch, 1989)
    - †Acarictis ryani (Gingerich & Deutsch, 1989)
  - (unranked): †Sinopa clade
    - Genus: †Prototomus ^{(paraphyletic genus)} (Cope, 1874)
      - †Prototomus deimos (Gingerich & Deutsch, 1989)
      - †Prototomus girardoti (Smith & Smith, 2001)
      - †Prototomus martis (Gingerich & Deutsch, 1989)
      - †Prototomus minimus (Smith & Smith, 2001)
      - †Prototomus phobos (Gingerich & Deutsch, 1989)
      - †Prototomus robustus (Matthew & Granger 1915)
      - †Prototomus secundarius (Cope, 1875)
      - †Prototomus viverrinus (Cope, 1874)
    - Genus: †Sinopa (Leidy, 1871)
      - †Sinopa jilinia (Morlo, 2014)
      - †Sinopa lania (Matthew, 1909)
      - †Sinopa longipes (Peterson, 1919)
      - †Sinopa major (Wortman, 1902)
      - †Sinopa minor (Wortman, 1902)
      - †Sinopa piercei (Bown, 1982)
      - †Sinopa pungens (Cope, 1872)
      - †Sinopa rapax (Leidy, 1871)
      - †Sinopa sp. A [AMNH FM 11538] (Matthew, 1906)
    - Incertae sedis:
      - †Sinopinae sp. [FMNH PM 59529] (Tomiya, 2021)
