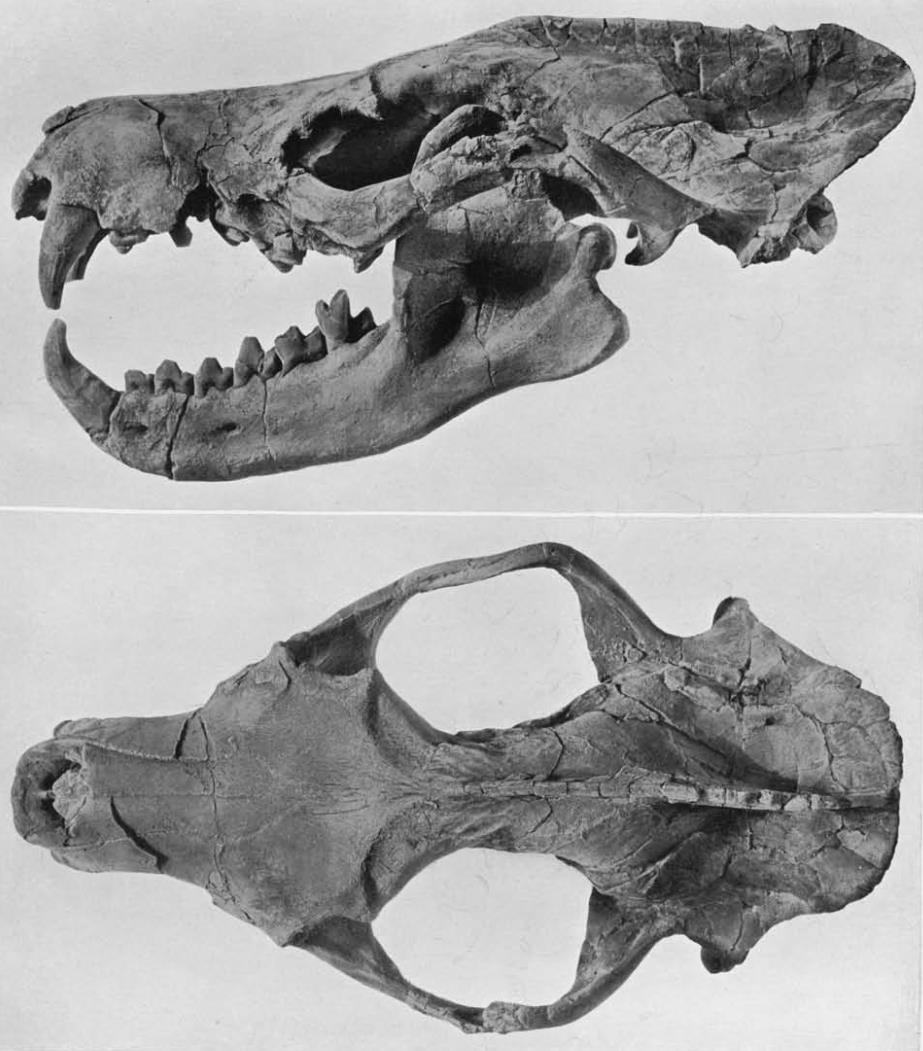
- Skull of Limnocyon verus
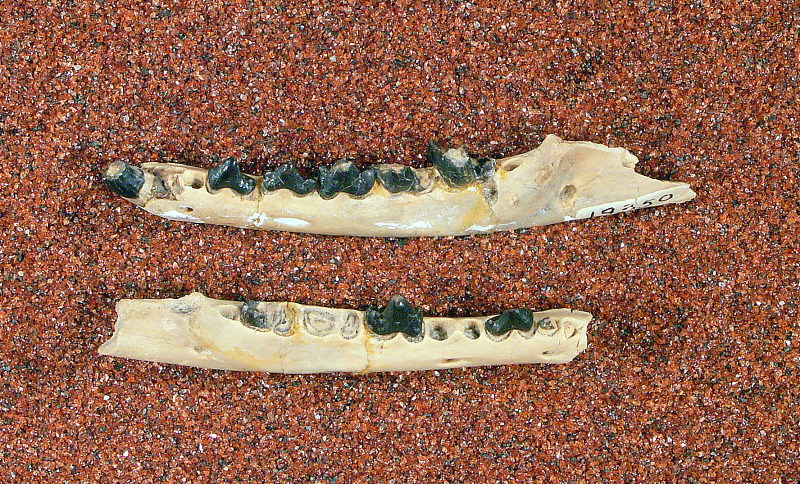
- lower jaw of Prolimnocyon antiquus

Scientific classification
- Kingdom: Animalia
- Phylum: Chordata
- Class: Mammalia
- Order: †Hyaenodonta
- Superfamily: †Limnocyonoidea
- Clade: †Limnocyoninae; Wortman, 1902

Type genus
- †Limnocyon Marsh, 1872

Genera
- [see classification]

Synonyms
- list of synonyms: Limnocyonidae (Gunnell, 1998); Limnocyoninae (Wortman, 1902); Limnocyonini (Van Valen, 1966); Limnocyononae (Lavrov, 1999); Limnocyontidae (Savage, 1973)

= Limnocyoninae =

Limnocyoninae Temporal range: Late Paleocene to Middle Eocene 57.0–40.1 Ma

Extinct family of mammals

Limnocyoninae ("swamp dogs") is a clade of extinct predatory mammals from extinct order Hyaenodonta. Fossil remains of these mammals are known from late Paleocene to late Eocene deposits in North America and Asia. Limnocyonines had only two molars in the upper and lower dentition.

== Classification and phylogeny ==
=== Taxonomy ===
- Clade: †Limnocyoninae (Wortman, 1902)
  - Genus: †Iridodon (Morlo & Gunnell, 2003)
    - †Iridodon datzae (Morlo & Gunnell, 2003)
  - Genus: †Limnocyon ^{(paraphyletic genus)} (Marsh, 1872)
    - †Limnocyon cuspidens (Morlo & Gunnell, 2005)
    - †Limnocyon potens (Matthew, 1909)
    - †Limnocyon verus (Marsh, 1872)
  - Genus: †Oxyaenodon (Matthew, 1899)
    - †Oxyaenodon dysodus (Matthew, 1899)
  - Genus: †Prolaena (Xu, 1979)
    - †Prolaena parva (Xu, 1979)
  - Genus: †Prolimnocyon ^{(paraphyletic genus)} (Matthew & Granger, 1915)
    - †Prolimnocyon antiquus (Matthew & Granger, 1915)
    - †Prolimnocyon atavus (Matthew & Granger, 1915)
    - †Prolimnocyon chowi (Meng, 1998)
    - †Prolimnocyon eerius (Gingerich, 1989)
    - †Prolimnocyon haematus (Gingerich & Deutsch, 1989)
    - †Prolimnocyon sp. [South Pass, Green River Basin, Wyoming] (Muldoon, 2018)
  - Genus: †Thinocyon (Marsh, 1872)
    - †Thinocyon medius (Wortman, 1902)
    - †Thinocyon velox (Marsh, 1872)
  - Incertae sedis:
    - †"Thinocyon" sichowensis (Chow, 1975)
