= Masrasector =

Masrasector Temporal range: Bartonian–Rupelian

Scientific classification
- Kingdom: Animalia
- Phylum: Chordata
- Class: Mammalia
- Order: †Hyaenodonta
- Family: †Teratodontidae
- Subfamily: †Teratodontinae
- Genus: †Masrasector; Simons and Gingerich, 1974

Type species
- Masrasector aegypticum Simons and Gingerich, 1974

Other species
- Masrasector ligabuei Crochet et al., 1990 Masrasector nananubis Borths and Seiffert, 2017

Extinct genus of hyainailouroid hyaenodont

Masrasector is an extinct genus of hyainailouroid hyaenodont that lived in Afro-Arabia from the Bartonian to the Rupelian stages of the Eocene and Oligocene epochs.

== Palaeobiology ==
=== Locomotion ===
Discriminant function analysis performed on the humeri of Masrasector nananubis and other hyaenodonts has found that M. nananubis was fully terrestrial and was likely a fast runner.
