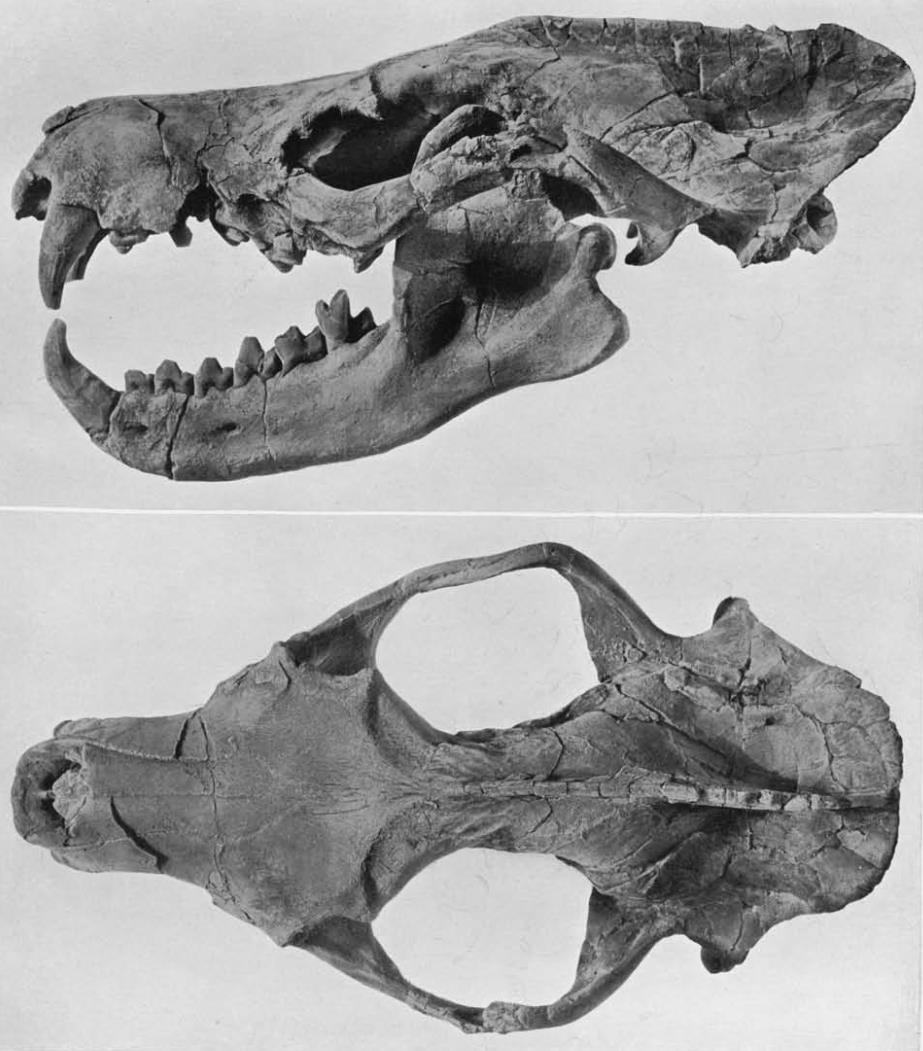
- Skull of Limnocyon verus
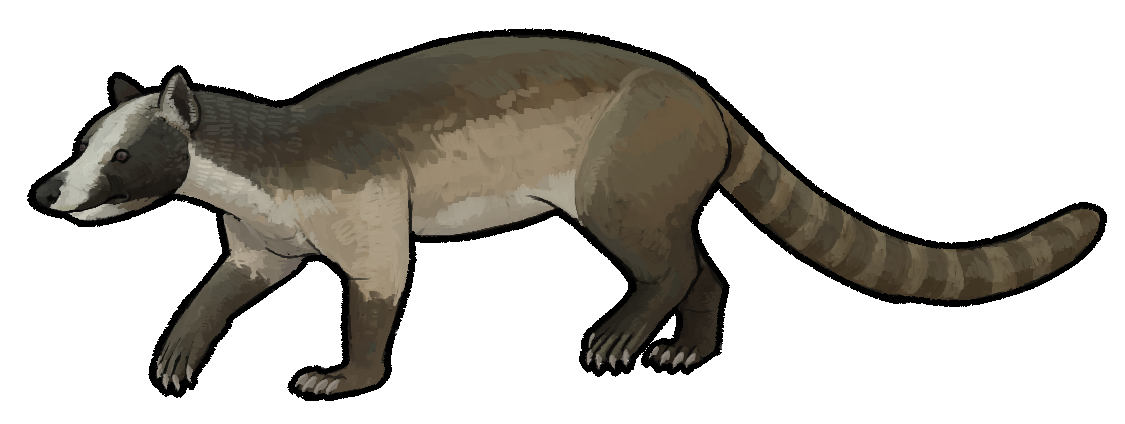
- Life Restoration of L. verus

Scientific classification
- Kingdom: Animalia
- Phylum: Chordata
- Class: Mammalia
- Order: †Hyaenodonta
- Clade: †Limnocyoninae
- Genus: †Limnocyon; Marsh, 1872

Type species
- †Limnocyon verus Marsh, 1872

Species
- †L. cuspidens (Morlo & Gunnell, 2005); †L. potens (Matthew, 1909); †L. verus (Marsh, 1872)

Synonyms
- synonyms of genus: Telmatocyon (Marsh, 1899); synonyms of species: L. potens: Limnocyon douglassi (Peterson, 1919); Limnocyon protens (Kay, 1957); L. verus: Limnocyon riparius (Marsh, 1872); Oxyaenodon wortmani (Van Valen, 1966); Sinopa vera (Matthew, 1899); Sinopa verus (Matthew, 1901); Stypolophus verus; Telmatocyon riparius (Marsh, 1899); Triacodon grandis (Marsh, 1872); Viverravus riparius (Marsh, 1872)

= Limnocyon =

Limnocyon Temporal range: Early-Middle Eocene (Bridgerian to Uintan) 49–40.1 Ma

Extinct genus of mammals

Limnocyon ("swamp dog") is an extinct paraphyletic genus of limnocyonine hyaenodont that lived in North America during the Early to Middle Eocene, going extinct at the end of Uintan stage. Fossils of this animal have been found in California, Utah and Wyoming.

== Description ==
Limnocyon was a small hyaenodont, the smaller species was L. versus with adults weighing 7.78 kg (17.2 lb). L. potens reached even larger sizes weighing 15.84 kg (34.9 lb). Like other limnocyonines, Limnocyon had only two molars in the upper and lower dentition.
