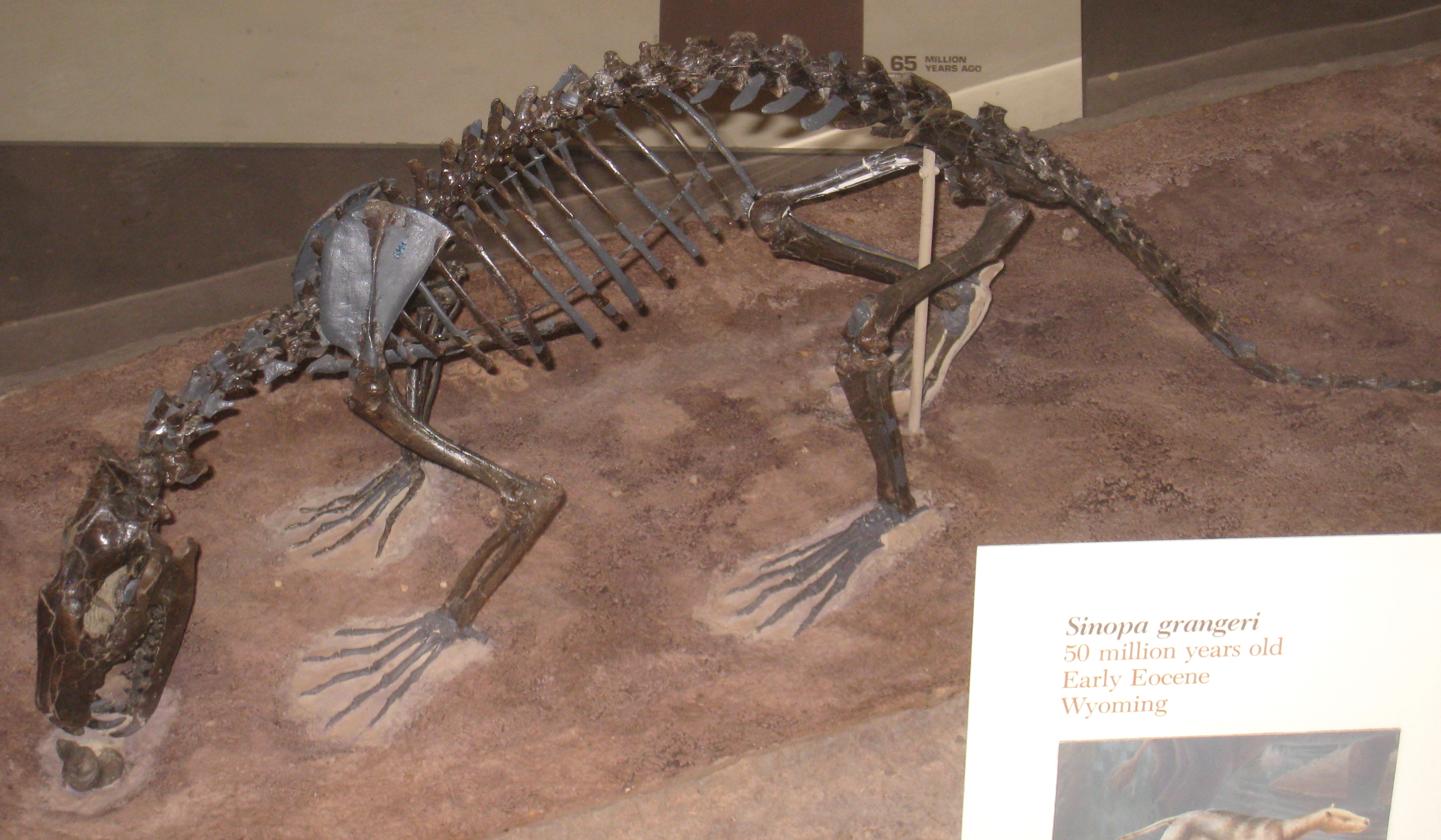
- Sinopa major skeleton
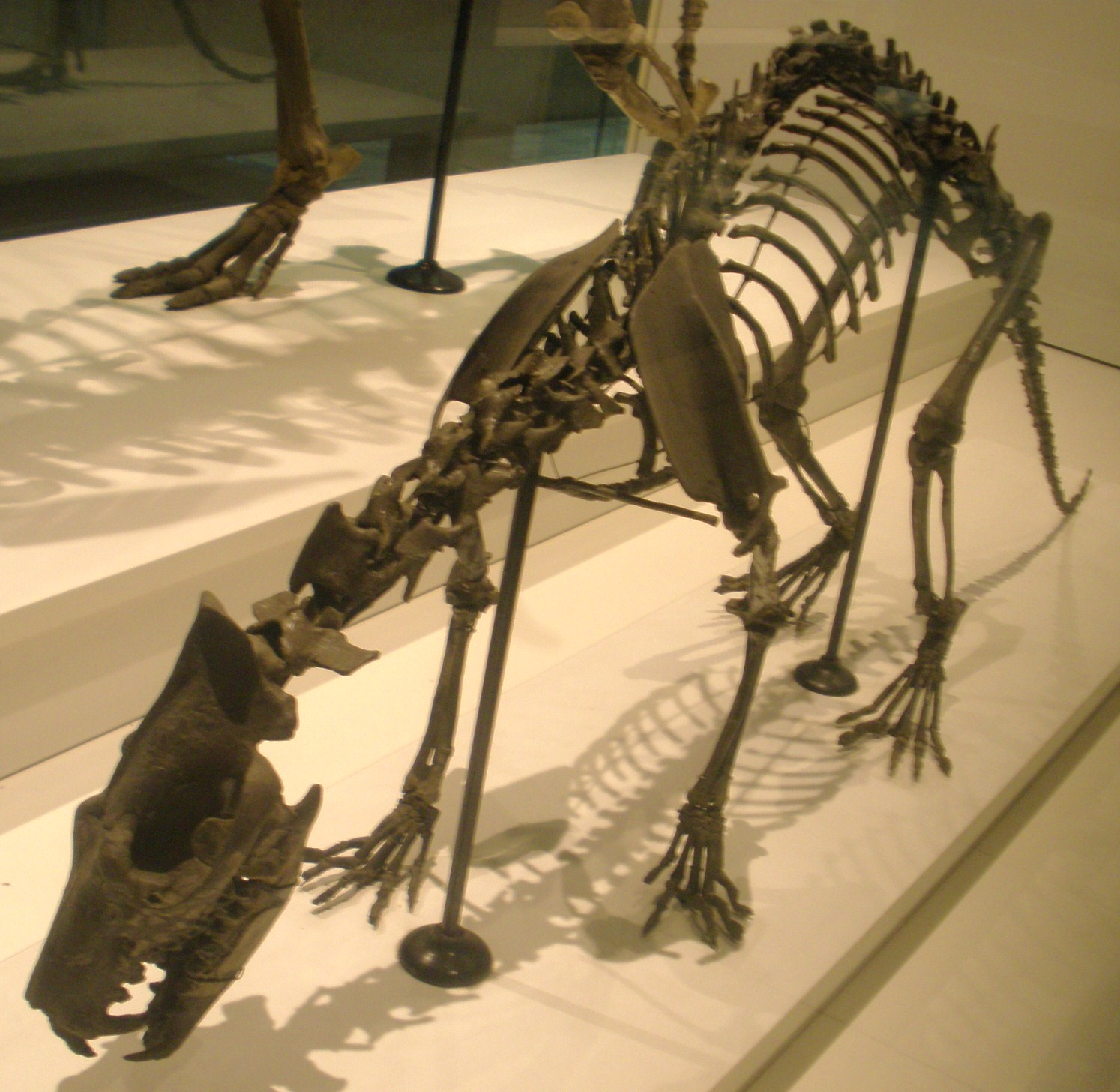
- Sinopa rapax skeleton

Scientific classification
- Kingdom: Animalia
- Phylum: Chordata
- Class: Mammalia
- Order: †Hyaenodonta
- Clade: †Sinopinae
- Genus: †Sinopa; Leidy, 1871

Type species
- †Sinopa rapax Leidy, 1871

Species
- †S. jilinia (Morlo, 2014); †S. lania (Matthew, 1909); †S. longipes (Peterson, 1919); †S. major (Wortman, 1902); †S. minor (Wortman, 1902); †S. piercei (Bown, 1982); †S. pungens (Cope, 1872); †S. rapax (Leidy, 1871); †S. sp. A [AMNH FM 11538] (Matthew, 1906)

Synonyms
- synonyms of genus: Mimocyon (Peterson, 1919); Proviverroides (Bown, 1982); Stypolophus (Cope, 1872); Triacodon (Marsh, 1871); synonyms of species: S. longipes: Miacis longipes (Simpson, 1945); Mimocyon longipes (Peterson, 1919); Proviverra longipes (Dawson, 1980); S. major: Proviverra grangeri (Van Valen, 1965); Proviverra major (Gustafson, 1986); Sinopa grangeri (Matthew, 1906); S. minor: Proviverra minor (Van Valen, 1965); S. piercei: Proviverroides piercei (Bown, 1982); S. pungens: Proviverra pungens (Van Valen, 1965); Stypolophus pungens (Cope, 1872); S. rapax: Proviverra rapax (Van Valen, 1965); Sinopa aculeatus (Cope, 1871); Stypolophus aculeatus (Cope, 1872); Stypolophus rapax; Triacodon aculeatus (Cope, 1872); Triacodon fallax (Marsh, 1872)

= Sinopa =

Sinopa Temporal range: Early to Middle Eocene (Ypresian to Lutetian) 50.5–42.7 Ma

Extinct genus of mammals

Sinopa ("swift fox") is an extinct genus of placental mammals from the extinct subfamily Sinopinae within the extinct order Hyaenodonta, that lived in North America and Asia from the early to middle Eocene.

== Description ==
Sinopa was a small genus of hyaenodont. Its carnassial teeth were the second upper molar and the lower third. Sinopa species had an estimated weight of 1.33–13.97 kg (2.9–30.8 lb).

== Taxonomy ==
The putative African species "Sinopa" ethiopica from Egypt was considered a species of Metasinopa by Savage (1965), although Holroyd (1994) considered it a potential new genus related to Quasiapterodon.

== Palaeobiology ==
=== Locomotion ===
Sinopa was semidigitigrade, and its pelvic morphology indicates that it was a cursorial animal. It was likely adapted for short bursts of speed.
