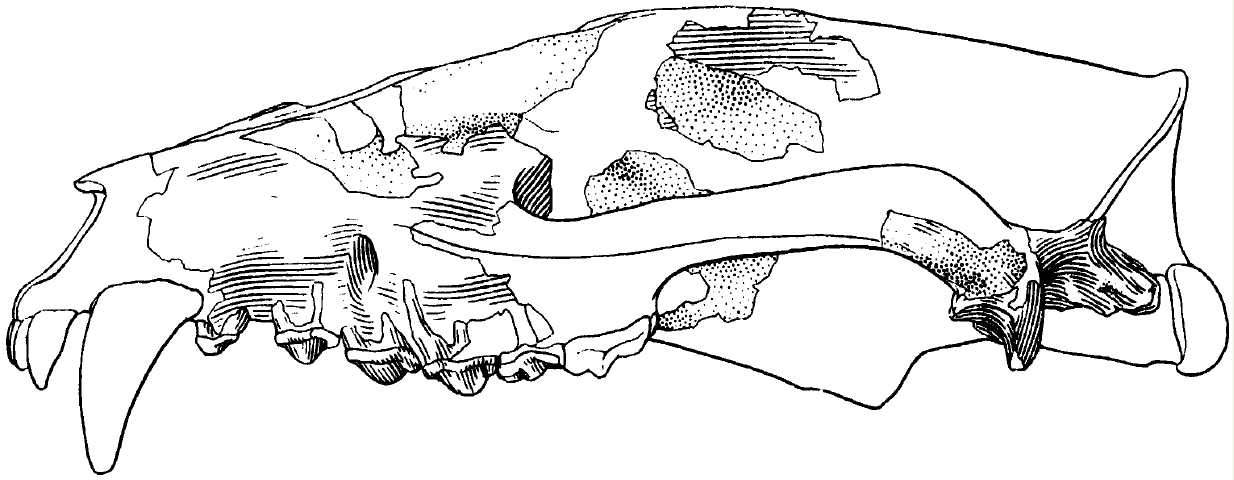
- Dissopsalis carnifex skull restoration, specimen AM19401

Scientific classification
- Kingdom: Animalia
- Phylum: Chordata
- Class: Mammalia
- Order: †Hyaenodonta
- Superfamily: †Hyainailouroidea
- Family: †Teratodontidae
- Subfamily: †Teratodontinae
- Tribe: †Dissopsalini
- Genus: †Dissopsalis; Pilgrim, 1910

Type species
- †Dissopsalis carnifex Pilgrim, 1910

Species
- †D. carnifex (Pilgrim, 1910); †D. pyroclasticus (Savage, 1965)

Synonyms
- synonyms of species: D. carnifex: Dissopsalis ruber (Pilgrim, 1910)

= Dissopsalis =

Dissopsalis Temporal range: Early to Late Miocene (Burdigalian to Tortonian) 16.1–7.5 Ma

Extinct family of mammals

Dissopsalis ('double scissors') is an extinct genus of hyaenodonts from extinct tribe Dissopsalini within family Teratodontidae. The older species, D. pyroclasticus, lived in Kenya during the middle Miocene (15.0 to 11.4 Ma), while the type species, D. carnifex, lived in India and Pakistan during the early to late Miocene (16.1 to 7.5 Ma). Dissopsalis was the last known hyaenodont genus.
