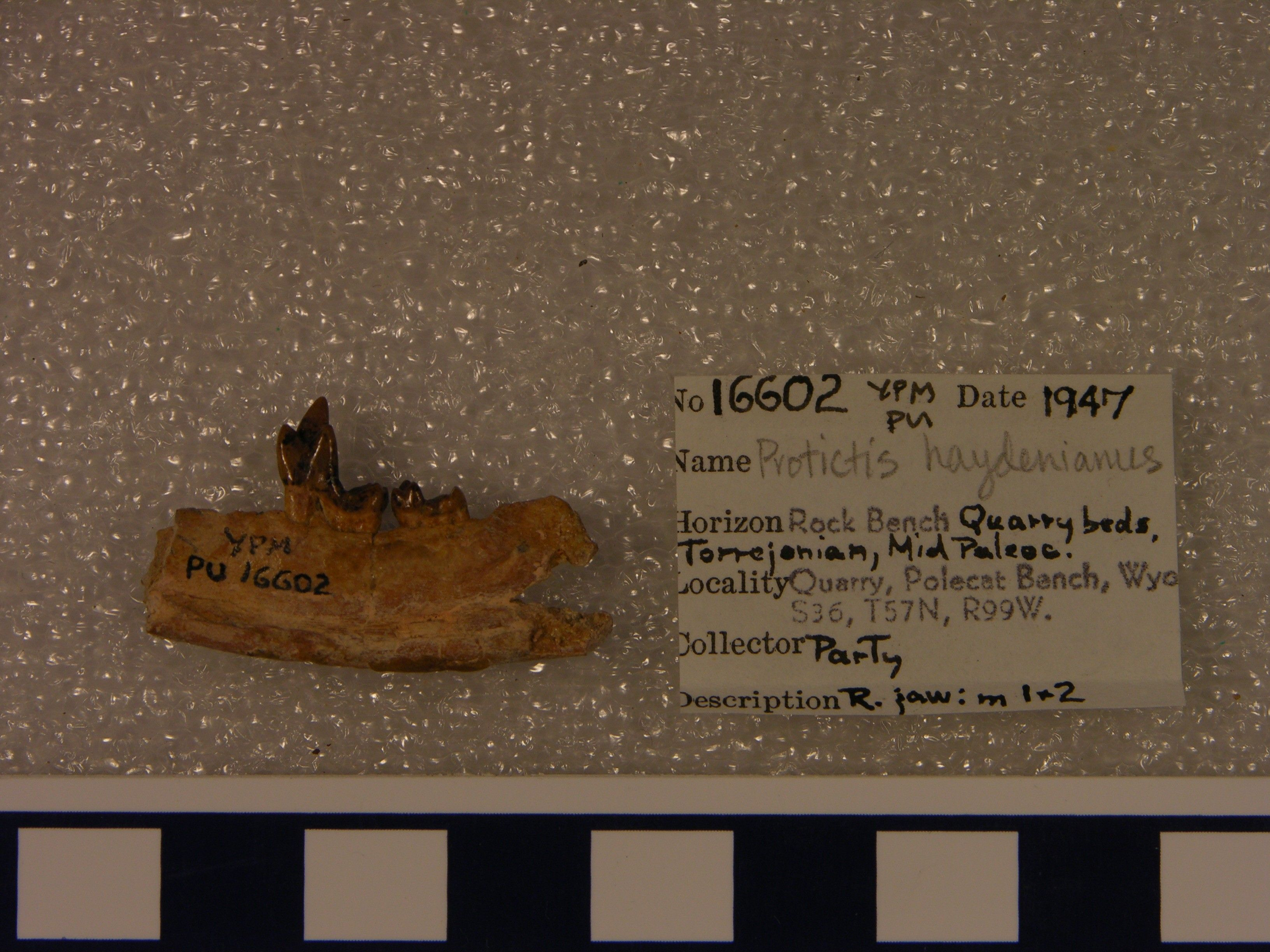
- Lower jaw of Protictis haydenianus

Scientific classification
- Kingdom: Animalia
- Phylum: Chordata
- Class: Mammalia
- Superfamily: †Viverravoidea
- Family: †Viverravidae
- Subfamily: †Didymictinae
- Genus: †Protictis; Matthew, 1937

Type species
- †Protictis haydenianus Cope, 1882

Species
- [see classification]

Synonyms
- synonyms of species: P. aprophatos: Protictoides aprophatos (Flynn & Galiano, 1982); P. haydenianus: Didymictis haydenianus (Cope, 1882); Didymictis primus (Cope, 1884); Prolimnocyon macfaddeni (Rigby, 1980); Viverravus haydenianus

= Protictis =

Protictis Temporal range: 63.8–39.7 Ma early Paleocene to middle Eocene

Extinct genus of carnivores

Protictis ("first weasel") is an extinct paraphyletic genus of placental mammals from extinct subfamily Didymictinae within extinct family Viverravidae, that lived in North America from early Paleocene to middle Eocene.

== Etymology ==
The name of genus Protictis comes from Ancient Greek πρῶτος- (prôtos-) 'first' and Latin ictis.

== Description ==
Protictis was a mongoose-like animal that was lightly built. The species had variable sizes. Parts of the skeleton of P. haydenianus are known and this species was about 75 cm (30 in) long, comparable to the related Didymictis and the modern-day Asian civets. The skull of P. simpsoni shows that this species was larger than P. haydenianus. P. minor, on the other hand, was smaller than P. haydenianus. The morphology of the limb bones of P haydenianus points at a scansorial lifestyle. Protictis had twice as many teeth as modern carnivores. The characteristic carnassials of carnivores were already clearly developed in Protictis, but the long and pointy teeth show that insects were still a major component of this diet. Endocasts of the skull shows that both vision and hearing were important senses, but the position of the eye sockets shows that three-dimensional vision was not as well developed as in modern carnivores.

== Classification and phylogeny ==
=== History of classification ===
Fossils of Protictis are found in the United States and Canada and date mainly from the early to late Paleocene. The holotype of first discovered species (a part of the upper and lower jaw) were described in 1882 by Edward Drinker Cope based on finds in the San Juan Basin in New Mexico and classified as Didymictis haydenianus. William Diller Matthew described Protictis as a subgenus of Didymictis in 1937 and in 1966 MacIntyre classified it as a separate genus.

=== Taxonomy ===
Genus: †Protictis ^{(paraphyletic genus)} (Matthew, 1937)
Subgenus:	Species:	Distribution of the species and type locality:	Age:
	†P. agastor (Gingerich & Winkler, 1985)	USA (Cedar Point Quarry in Wyoming)	60.9 - 56.2 Ma
	†P. haydenianus (Cope, 1882)	USA: Montana; San Juan Basin in New Mexico; Utah; Wyoming	63.8 - 56.2 Ma
	†P. minor (Meehan & Wilson, 2002)	USA (New Mexico)	63.8 - 60.9 Ma
	†P. paralus (Holtzman, 1978)	Canada (Alberta and Saskatchewan); USA: Wyoming; Judson in North Dakota	60.9 - 56.2 Ma
	†P. simpsoni (Meehan & Wilson, 2002)	USA (New Mexico)	63.8 - 60.9 Ma
†Protictoides (Flynn & Galiano, 1982)	†P. aprophatos (Flynn & Galiano, 1982)	USA (Wyoming)	46.2 - 39.7 Ma
