= Pristinictis =

Pristinictis Temporal range: 60.9–60.0 Ma middle Paleocene

Scientific classification
- Kingdom: Animalia
- Phylum: Chordata
- Class: Mammalia
- Infraclass: Placentalia
- Superfamily: †Viverravoidea
- Family: †Viverravidae
- Subfamily: †Didymictinae
- Genus: †Pristinictis; Fox & Youzwyshyn, 1994

Type species
- †Pristinictis connata Fox & Youzwyshyn, 1994

Extinct genus of mammals

Pristinictis ("primitive weasel") is an extinct genus of placental mammals from extinct subfamily Didymictinae within extinct family Viverravidae, that lived in North America during middle Paleocene.
