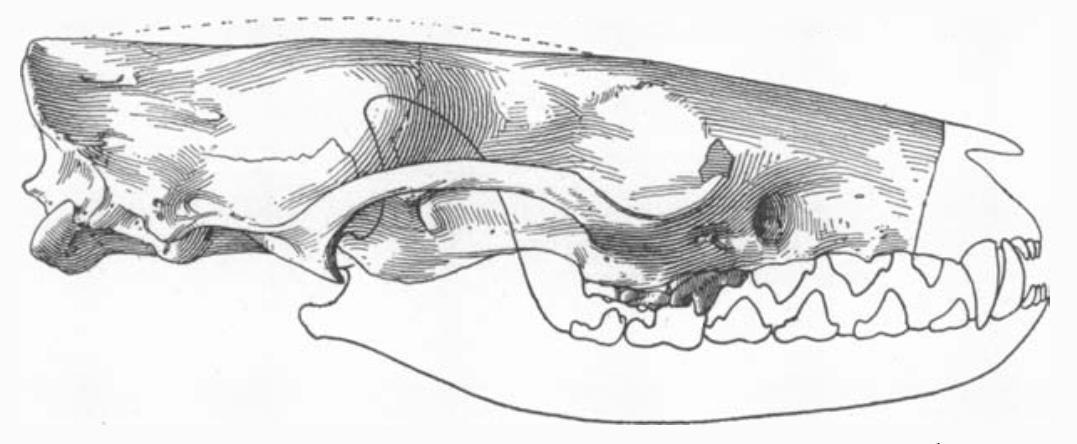
- skull of Viverravus minutus
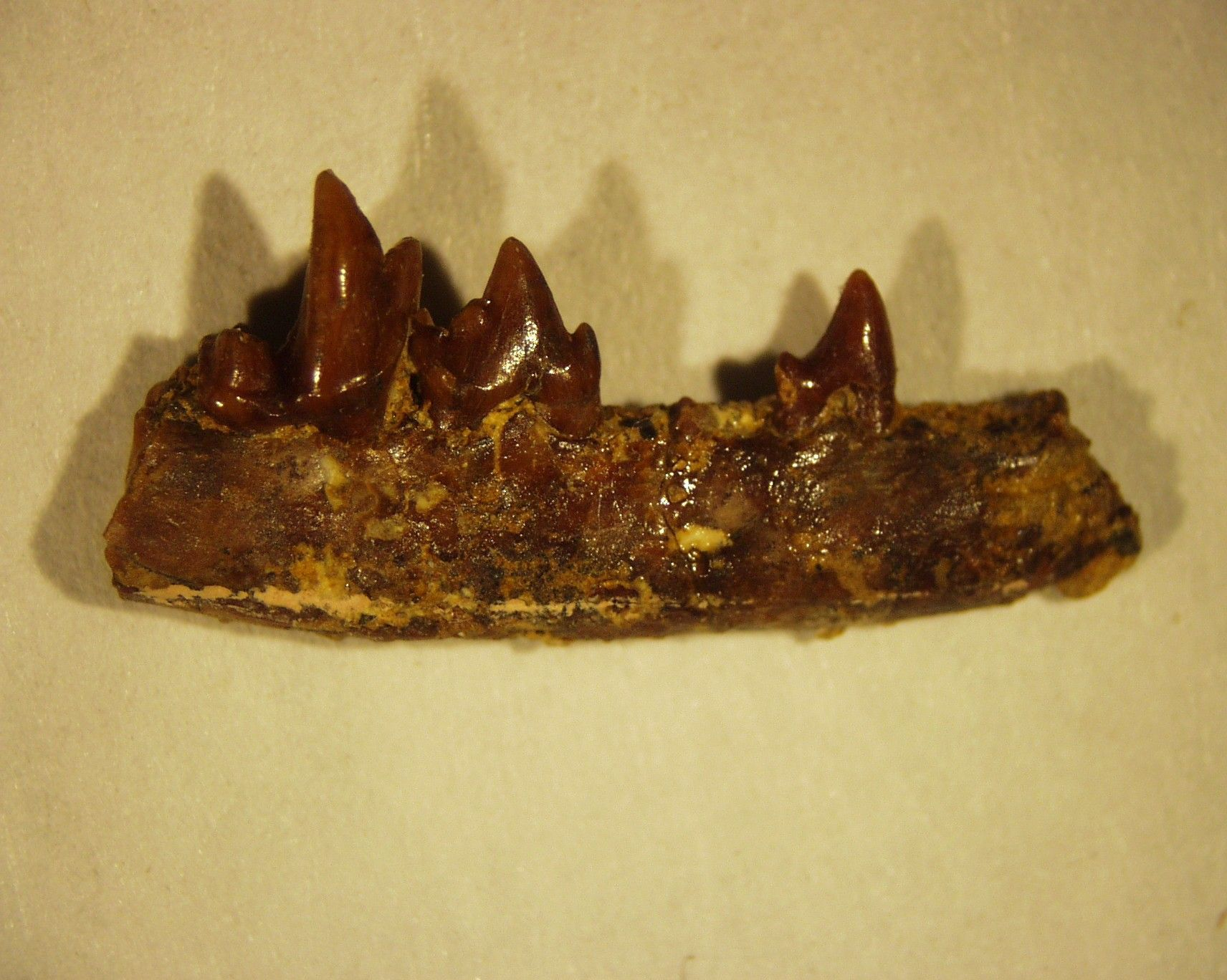
- lower jaw of Simpsonictis tenuis

Scientific classification
- Kingdom: Animalia
- Phylum: Chordata
- Class: Mammalia
- Clade: Carnivoramorpha
- Superfamily: †Viverravoidea
- Family: †Viverravidae
- Subfamily: †Viverravinae; Wortman & Matthew, 1899

Type genus
- †Viverravus Marsh, 1872

Genera
- †Simpsonictis; †Viverravus; †Viverriscus

Synonyms
- Viverravidae (Wortman & Matthew, 1899); Viverravina (Kalandadze & Rautian, 1992); Viverravini (Kalandadze & Rautian, 1992)

= Viverravinae =

Viverravinae Temporal range: 63.8–39.7 Ma early Paleocene – middle Eocene

Extinct subfamily of carnivores

Viverravinae ("ancestors of viverrids") is an extinct subfamily of mammals from extinct family Viverravidae, that lived from the early Palaeocene to the middle Eocene in North America, Asia and Europe.

== Classification and phylogeny ==
=== Classification ===
- Subfamily: †Viverravinae (Wortman & Matthew, 1899)
  - Genus: †Simpsonictis (MacIntyre, 1962)
    - †Simpsonictis jaynanneae (Rigby, 1980)
    - †Simpsonictis pegus (Gingerich & Winkler, 1985)
    - †Simpsonictis tenuis (Simpson, 1935)
  - Genus: †Viverravus (Marsh, 1872)
    - †Viverravus acutus (Matthew & Granger, 1915)
    - †Viverravus gracilis (Marsh, 1872)
    - †Viverravus lawsoni (Hooker, 2010)
    - †Viverravus laytoni (Gingerich & Winkler, 1985)
    - †Viverravus lutosus (Gazin, 1952)
    - †Viverravus minutus (Wortman, 1901)
    - †Viverravus politus (Matthew & Granger, 1915)
    - †Viverravus rosei (Polly, 1997)
    - †Viverravus sicarius (Matthew, 1909)
    - †Viverravus sp. [V11141] (Meng, 1998)
    - †Viverravus sp. [Locality Group 2, Washakie Basin, Wyoming] (Tomiya, 2021)
  - Genus: †Viverriscus (Beard & Dawson, 2009)
    - †Viverriscus omnivorus (Beard & Dawson, 2009)
