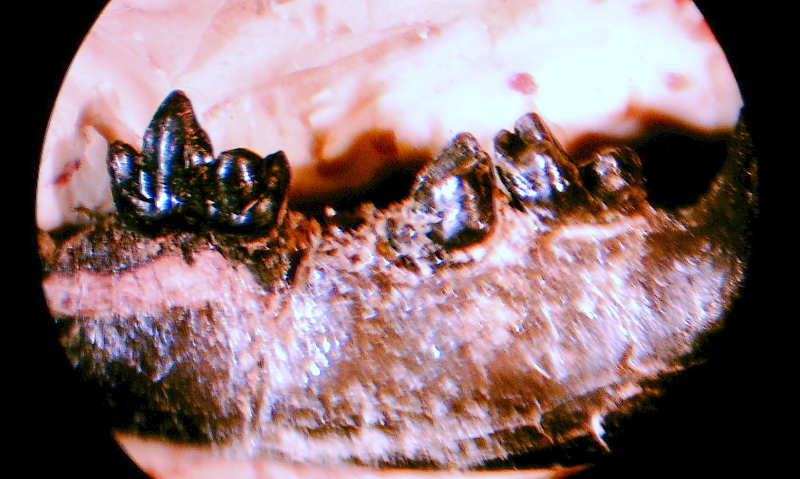
- lower jaw of Bryanictis microlestes

Scientific classification
- Kingdom: Animalia
- Phylum: Chordata
- Class: Mammalia
- Superfamily: †Viverravoidea
- Family: †Viverravidae
- Subfamily: †Didymictinae
- Genus: †Bryanictis; MacIntyre, 1966

Type species
- †Bryanictis microlestes Simpson, 1935

Species
- †B. microlestes (Simpson, 1935); †B. paulus (Meehan & Wilson, 2002); †B. terlinguae (Standhardt, 1986)

Synonyms
- synonyms of species: B. microlestes: Didymictis microlestes (Simpson, 1935); Protictis microlestes (MacIntyre, 1966); B. terlinguae: Protictis terlinguae (Standhardt, 1986)

= Bryanictis =

Bryanictis Temporal range: 63.8–56.2 Ma early to late Paleocene

Extinct genus of mammals

Bryanictis ("Bryan's weasel") is an extinct genus of placental mammals from extinct subfamily Didymictinae within extinct family Viverravidae, that lived in North America, from the early to late Paleocene.
