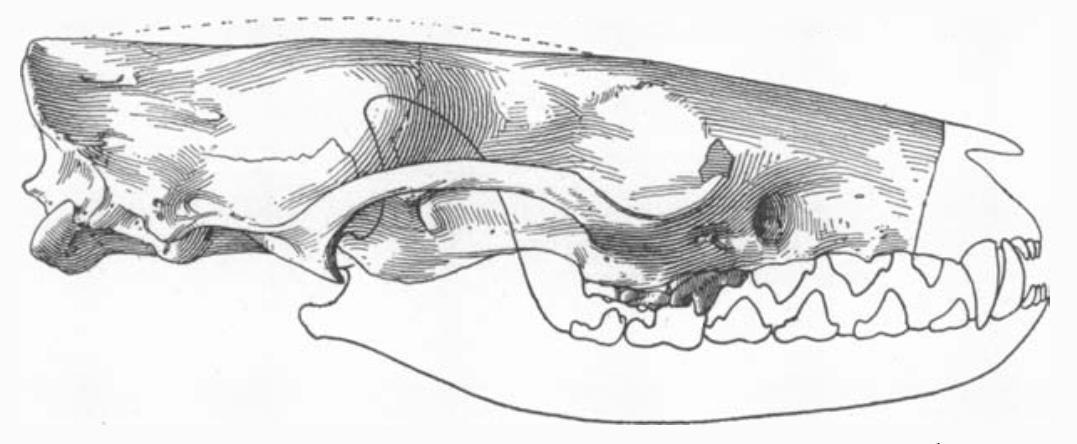
- skull of Viverravus minutus
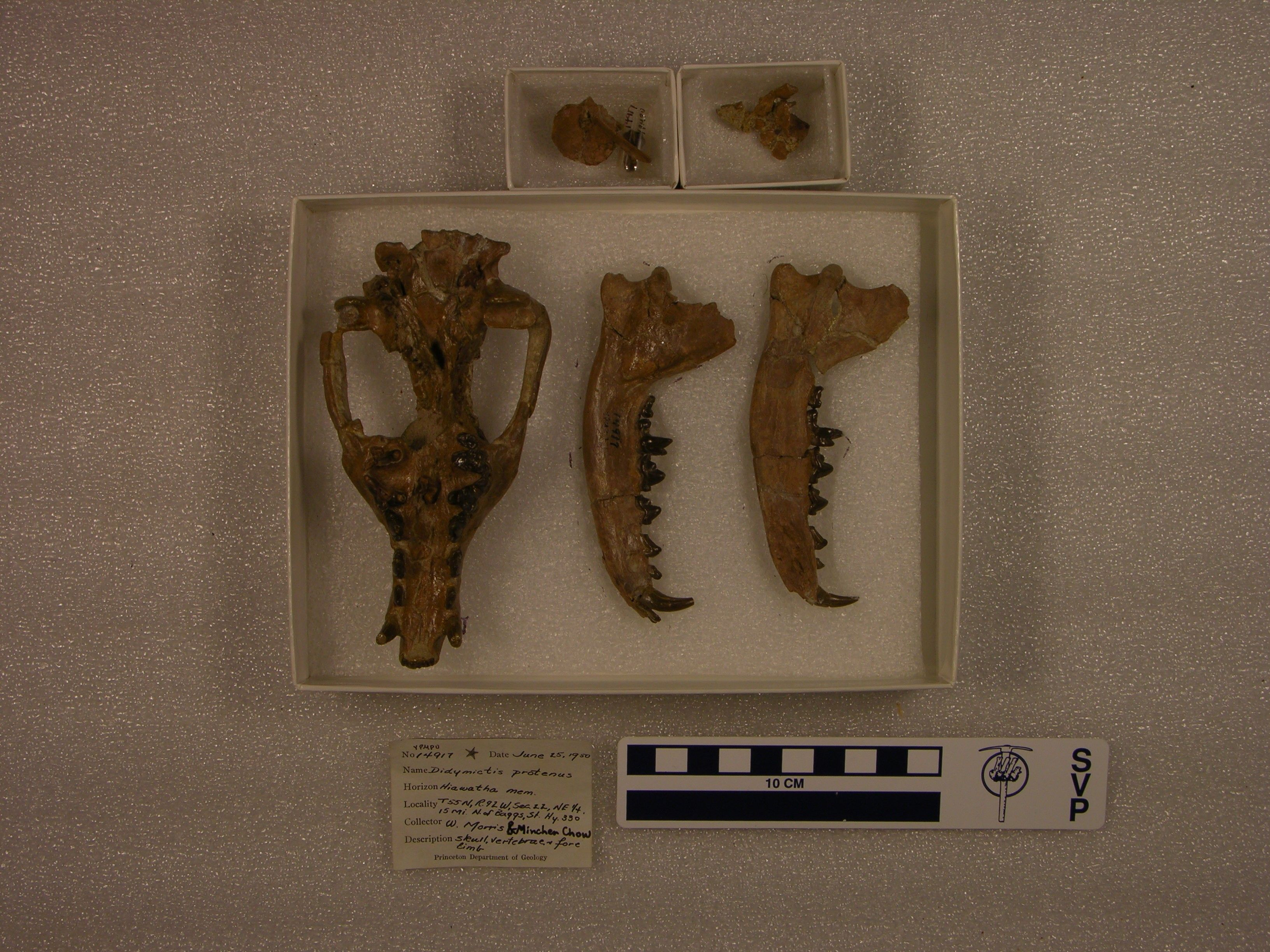
- skull of Didymictis protenus

Scientific classification
- Kingdom: Animalia
- Phylum: Chordata
- Class: Mammalia
- Clade: Pan-Carnivora
- Clade: Carnivoramorpha
- Superfamily: †Viverravoidea; Wortman & Matthew, 1899
- Family: †Viverravidae; Wortman & Matthew, 1899

Type genus
- †Viverravus Marsh, 1872

Genera
- [see classification]

Synonyms
- synonyms of family: Didymictida (Kretzoi, 1945); Didymictidae (Flynn & Galiano, 1982); Viverravidea; Viverravinae (Matthew, 1909)

= Viverravidae =

Viverravidae Temporal range: Early Paleocene - Late Eocene, 66.043–33.9 Ma

Extinct family of carnivorous mammals

Viverravidae ("ancestors of viverrids") is an extinct monophyletic family of mammals from extinct superfamily Viverravoidea within the clade Pan-Carnivora, that lived from the early Palaeocene to the late Eocene in North America, Europe and Asia. They were once thought to be the earliest carnivorans and ancestral to extant ones, but now are placed outside the order Carnivora based on cranial morphology as relatives (a plesion-group) to extant carnivorans. More recent analysis suggest a placement outside of the clade containing hyaenodonts, oxyaenids, and carnivoraformes.

== General characteristics ==
Wang and Tedford propose that they arose in North America 66–60 million years ago, spread to Asia then later to Europe, and were the first carnivoramorphans and possessed the first true pair of carnassial teeth. In viverravids, the skull is elongated and the number of molars is reduced to two (M1/m1 and M2/m2 are present and M3/m3 are absent).

== Classification and phylogeny ==
=== Classification ===
Taxonomy retrieved from the Paleobiology Database

Superfamily: †Viverravoidea (Wortman & Matthew, 1899)
Family: †Viverravidae (Wortman & Matthew, 1899)

- Genus: †Orientictis (Huang & Zheng, 2005)
  - †Orientictis spanios (Huang & Zheng, 2005)
- Genus: †Pappictidops (Qiu & Li, 1977)
  - †Pappictidops acies (Wang, 1978)
  - †Pappictidops obtusus (Wang, 1978)
  - †Pappictidops orientalis (Qiu & Li, 1977)
- Genus: †Preonictis (Tong & Wang, 2006)
  - †Preonictis youngi (Tong & Wang, 2006)
- Genus: †Variviverra (Tong & Wang, 2006)
  - †Variviverra vegetatus (Tong & Wang, 2006)
- Incertae sedis:
  - †Viverravidae sp. [CM 71188 & CM 71189] (Friscia & Rasmussen, 2010)
- Subfamily: †Didymictinae (Flynn & Galiano, 1982)
  - Genus: †Bryanictis (MacIntyre, 1966)
    - †Bryanictis microlestes (Simpson, 1935)
    - †Bryanictis paulus (Meehan & Wilson, 2002)
    - †Bryanictis terlinguae (Standhardt, 1986)
  - Genus: †Didymictis (Cope, 1875)
    - †Didymictis altidens (Cope, 1880)
    - †Didymictis dellensis (Dorr, 1952)
    - †Didymictis leptomylus (Cope, 1880)
    - †Didymictis protenus (Cope, 1874)
    - †Didymictis proteus (Polly, 1997)
    - †Didymictis vancleveae (Robinson, 1966)
    - †Didymictis sp. [Erquelinnes, Hainaut, Belgium] (Dollo, 1909)
  - Genus: †Intyrictis (Gingerich & Winkler, 1985)
    - †Intyrictis vanvaleni (MacIntyre, 1966)
  - Genus: †Pristinictis (Fox & Youzwyshyn, 1994)
    - †Pristinictis connata (Fox & Youzwyshyn, 1994)
  - Genus: †Protictis ^{(paraphyletic genus)} (Matthew, 1937)
    - †Protictis agastor (Gingerich & Winkler, 1985)
    - †Protictis haydenianus (Cope, 1882)
    - †Protictis minor (Meehan & Wilson, 2002)
    - †Protictis paralus (Holtzman, 1978)
    - †Protictis simpsoni (Meehan & Wilson, 2002)
    - Subgenus: †Protictoides (Flynn & Galiano, 1982)
      - †Protictis aprophatos (Flynn & Galiano, 1982)
  - Genus: †Raphictis (Gingerich & Winkler, 1985)
    - †Raphictis gausion (Gingerich & Winkler, 1985)
    - †Raphictis iota (Scott, 2008)
    - †Raphictis machaera (Rankin, 2009)
    - †Raphictis nanoptexis (Rankin, 2009)
  - Incertae sedis:
    - †"Deltatherium" durini (Van Valen, 1978)
- Subfamily: †Ictidopappinae (Van Valen, 1969)
  - Genus: †Ictidopappus (Simpson, 1935)
    - †Ictidopappus mustelinus (Simpson, 1935)
- Subfamily: †Viverravinae (Wortman & Matthew, 1899)
  - Genus: †Simpsonictis (MacIntyre, 1962)
    - †Simpsonictis jaynanneae (Rigby, 1980)
    - †Simpsonictis pegus (Gingerich & Winkler, 1985)
    - †Simpsonictis tenuis (Simpson, 1935)
  - Genus: †Viverravus (Marsh, 1872)
    - †Viverravus acutus (Matthew & Granger, 1915)
    - †Viverravus gracilis (Marsh, 1872)
    - †Viverravus lawsoni (Hooker, 2010)
    - †Viverravus laytoni (Gingerich & Winkler, 1985)
    - †Viverravus lutosus (Gazin, 1952)
    - †Viverravus minutus (Wortman, 1901)
    - †Viverravus politus (Matthew & Granger, 1915)
    - †Viverravus rosei (Polly, 1997)
    - †Viverravus sicarius (Matthew, 1909)
    - †Viverravus sp. [V11141] (Meng, 1998)
    - †Viverravus sp. [Locality Group 2, Washakie Basin, Wyoming] (Tomiya, 2021)
  - Genus: †Viverriscus (Beard & Dawson, 2009)
    - †Viverriscus omnivorus (Beard & Dawson, 2009)

=== Phylogeny ===
The phylogenetic relationships of family Viverravidae are shown in the following cladogram:

- Carnivoramorpha
  - Carnivoraformes
  - ?
    †Carnivoramorpha sp. (UALVP 31176)
  - ?
    †Carnivoramorpha sp. (USNM 538395)
  - ?
    †"Sinopa" insectivorus
  - †Viverravidae sensu lato
    - ?
      †Ravenictis
    - ?
      †Carnivoramorpha sp. (UALVP 50993 & UALVP 50994)
    - †Viverravoidea
      - †Viverravidae sensu stricto
        - - - †Pappictidops
              - - †Pappictidops acies
                - †Pappictidops obtusus
              - †Pappictidops orientalis
            - †Orientictis
              †Orientictis spanios
            - †Preonictis
              †Preonictis youngi
            - †Variviverra
              †Variviverra vegetatus
          - - †Ictidopappinae
              - †Ictidopappus
                †Ictidopappus mustelinus
        - - †Viverravinae
            - †Viverravus
              - - - - - †Viverravus minutus
                      - †Viverravus sicarius
                      - †Viverravus sp. (Locality Group 2, Washakie Basin, Wyoming)
                    - †Viverravus gracilis
                    - †Viverravus lutosus
                  - †Viverravus acutus
                  - †Viverravus rosei
                - †Viverravus laytoni
              - ?
                †Viverravus sp. (V11141)
              - †Viverravus lawsoni
              - †Viverravus politus
            - - †Viverriscus
                †Viverriscus omnivorus
              - †Simpsonictis
                - †Simpsonictis jaynanneae
                - †Simpsonictis pegus
                - †Simpsonictis tenuis
          - ?
            †Viverravidae sp. (CM 71188 & CM 71189)
          - †Didymictinae
            - - †Bryanictis
                - †Bryanictis microlestes
                - †Bryanictis paulus
                - †Bryanictis terlinguae
              - †Intyrictis
                †Intyrictis vanvaleni
            - †Protictis
              - †Protictis haydenianus
              - †Protictis minor
              - †Protictis simpsoni
              - - - †Raphictis
                    - †Raphictis gausion
                    - †Raphictis iota
                    - †Raphictis machaera
                    - †Raphictis nanoptexis
                  - †Protictis paralus
                - - †Protictis agastor
                  - †(Protictoides)
                    †Protictis aprophatos
                  - †Pristinictis
                    †Pristinictis connata
                  - ?
                    †"Deltatherium" durini
                  - †Didymictis
                    - †Didymictis dellensis
                    - †Didymictis proteus
                    - ?
                      †Didymictis sp. (Erquelinnes, Hainaut, Belgium)
                    - - †Didymictis altidens
                      - †Didymictis leptomylus
                      - †Didymictis protenus
                      - †Didymictis vancleveae

== See also ==
- Mammal classification
- Carnivoramorpha
- Miacoidea
