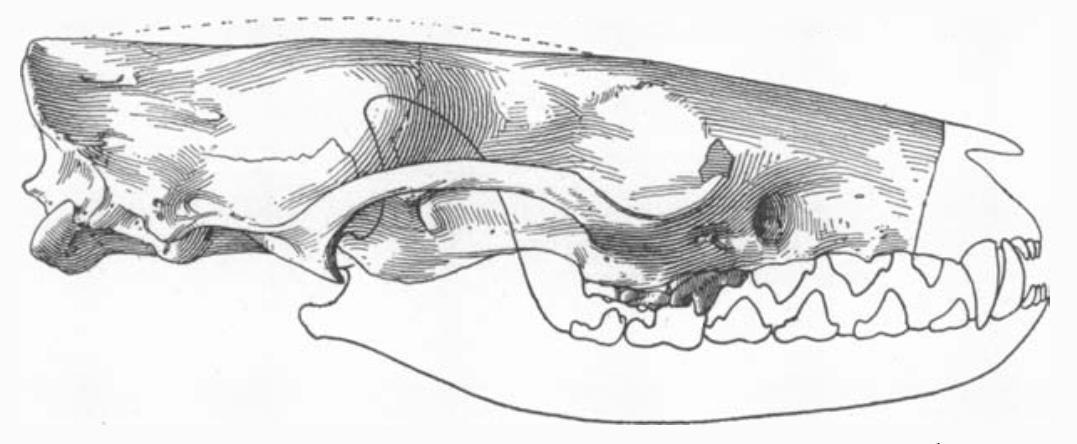
- skull of Viverravus minutus

Scientific classification
- Kingdom: Animalia
- Phylum: Chordata
- Class: Mammalia
- Superfamily: †Viverravoidea
- Family: †Viverravidae
- Subfamily: †Viverravinae
- Genus: †Viverravus; Marsh, 1872

Type species
- †Viverravus gracilis Marsh, 1872

Species
- [see classification]

Synonyms
- synonyms of genus: Triacodon (Marsh, 1871); Xiphacodon (Schlosser, 1890); Ziphacodon (Marsh, 1872); synonyms of species: V. gracilis: Didymictis dawkinsianus (Cope, 1881); Harpalodon vulpinus (Marsh, 1872); Triacodon fallax (Marsh, 1871); Viverravus dawkinsianus (Cope, 1881); Viverravus nitidus (Marsh, 1872); Viverravus vulpinus (Marsh, 1872); Ziphacodon ugatus (Marsh, 1872); Ziphacodon rugatus (Marsh, 1872); V. laytoni: Protictis laytoni (Gingerich & Winkler, 1985); Viverravus bowni (Gingerich, 1987); V. politus: Protictis schaffi (Gingerich & Winkler, 1985); Viverravus schaffi (Gingerich & Winkler, 1985)

= Viverravus =

Viverravus Temporal range: 60.9–39.7 Ma Middle Paleocene to Middle Eocene

Extinct genus of mammals

Viverravus ("ancestor of Viverra") is an extinct genus of placental mammals from extinct subfamily Viverravinae within extinct family Viverravidae, that lived in North America, Europe and Asia from the middle Paleocene to middle Eocene.

== Classification and phylogeny ==
=== Taxonomy ===
Genus: †Viverravus (Marsh, 1872)
Species:	Distribution of the species and type locality:	Age:
†V. acutus (Matthew & Granger, 1915)	USA (Colorado and Wyoming)	56.2–50.5 Ma
†V. gracilis (Marsh, 1872)	USA: Colorado; Utah; Grizzly Buttes, Bridger Formation in Wyoming	54.9–46.2 Ma
†V. lawsoni (Hooker, 2010)	UK (Abbey Wood, Blackheath Beds Formation in Greater London)	56.0–55.2 Ma
†V. laytoni (Gingerich & Winkler, 1985)	Canada (Alberta); USA (Princeton Quarry, Fort Union Formation, Clark's Fork Basin in Wyoming)	60.9–54.9 Ma
†V. lutosus (Gazin, 1952)	USA: Colorado; Knight Formation in Wyoming	54.9–46.2 Ma
†V. minutus (Wortman, 1901)	USA (Colorado, Nevada, Utah and Wyoming)	54.9–39.7 Ma
†V. politus (Matthew & Granger, 1915)	USA (Colorado and Wyoming)	60.9–50.5 Ma
†V. rosei (Polly, 1997)	USA (Wyoming)	56.2–50.5 Ma
†V. sicarius (Matthew, 1909)	USA: Colorado; Utah; Bridger Formation in Wyoming	50.5–39.7 Ma
†V. sp. [V11141] (Meng, 1998)	China (Inner Mongolia)	42.0–39.9 Ma
†V. sp. [Locality Group 2, Washakie Basin, Wyoming] (Tomiya, 2021)	USA (Wyoming)	47.0–46.2 Ma
