= Intyrictis =

Intyrictis Temporal range: 63.8–60.9 Ma early Paleocene

Scientific classification
- Kingdom: Animalia
- Phylum: Chordata
- Class: Mammalia
- Infraclass: Placentalia
- Superfamily: †Viverravoidea
- Family: †Viverravidae
- Subfamily: †Didymictinae
- Genus: †Intyrictis; Gingerich & Winkler, 1985

Type species
- †Intyrictis vanvaleni MacIntyre, 1966

Synonyms
- synonyms of species: I. vanvaleni: Bryanictis vanvaleni (MacIntyre, 1966); Protictis vanvaleni (MacIntyre, 1966)

Extinct genus of mammals

Intyrictis ("MacIntyre's weasel") is an extinct genus of placental mammals from extinct subfamily Didymictinae within extinct family Viverravidae, that lived in North America during the early Paleocene.
