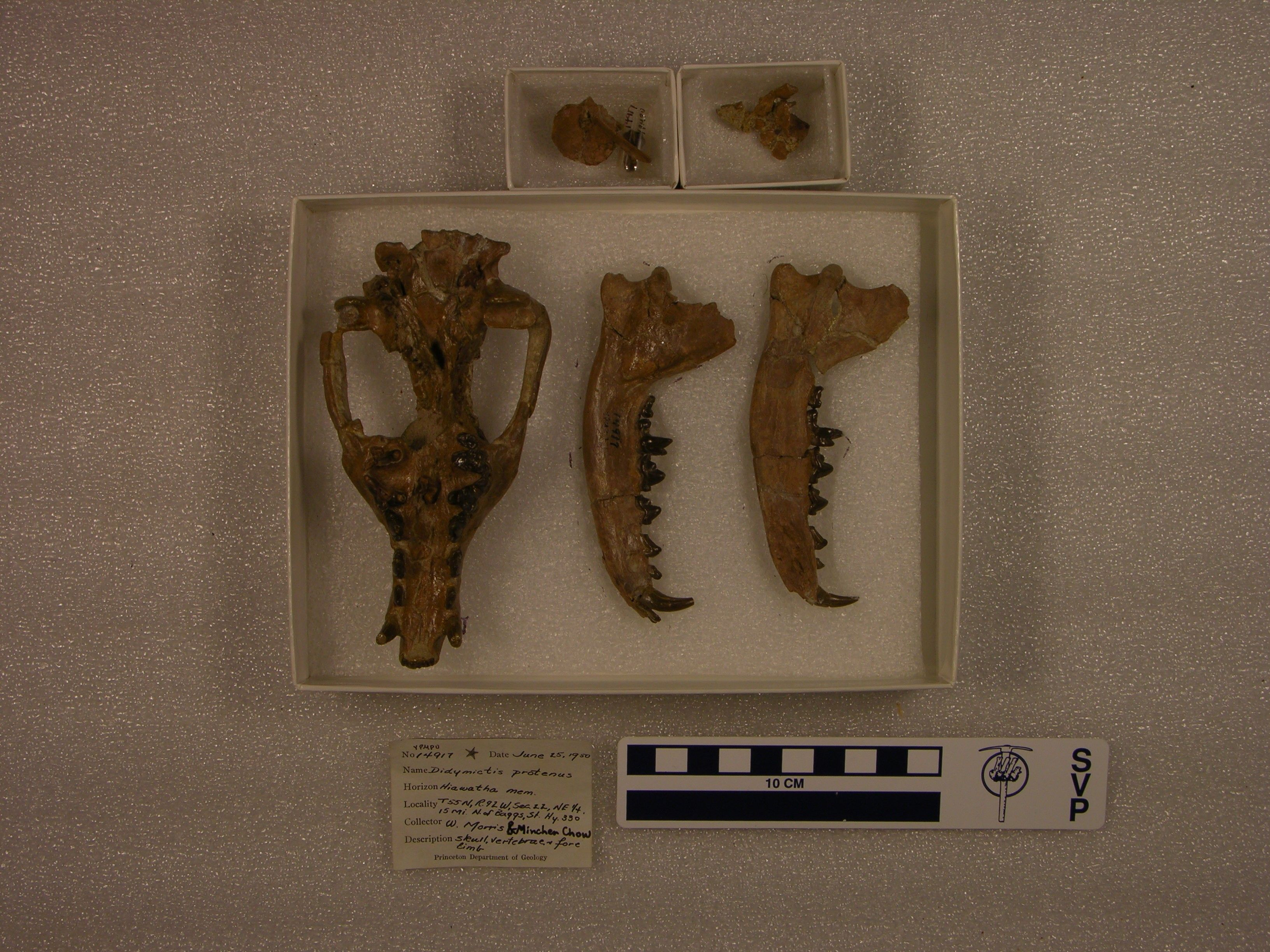
- skull of Didymictis protenus

Scientific classification
- Kingdom: Animalia
- Phylum: Chordata
- Class: Mammalia
- Clade: Carnivoramorpha
- Superfamily: †Viverravoidea
- Family: †Viverravidae
- Subfamily: †Didymictinae; Flynn & Galiano, 1982

Type genus
- †Didymictis Cope, 1875

Genera
- †Bryanictis; †Didymictis; †Intyrictis; †Pristinictis; †Protictis ^{(paraphyletic genus)}; †Raphictis; Incertae sedis: †"Deltatherium" durini

Synonyms
- Didymictida (Flynn & Galiano, 1982); Didymictidae (Flynn & Galiano, 1982)

= Didymictinae =

Didymictinae Temporal range: 63.8–39.7 Ma early Paleocene - middle Eocene

Extinct subfamily of carnivores

Didymictinae ("double weasels") is an extinct subfamily of mammals from extinct family Viverravidae, that lived from the early Palaeocene to the middle Eocene in North America and Europe.

== Classification and phylogeny ==
=== Classification ===
- Subfamily: †Didymictinae (Wortman & Matthew, 1899)
  - Genus: †Bryanictis (MacIntyre, 1966)
    - †Bryanictis microlestes (Simpson, 1935)
    - †Bryanictis paulus (Meehan & Wilson, 2002)
    - †Bryanictis terlinguae (Standhardt, 1986)
  - Genus: †Didymictis (Cope, 1875)
    - †Didymictis altidens (Cope, 1880)
    - †Didymictis dellensis (Dorr, 1952)
    - †Didymictis leptomylus (Cope, 1880)
    - †Didymictis protenus (Cope, 1874)
    - †Didymictis proteus (Polly, 1997)
    - †Didymictis vancleveae (Robinson, 1966)
    - †Didymictis sp. [Erquelinnes, Hainaut, Belgium] (Dollo, 1909)
  - Genus: †Intyrictis (Gingerich & Winkler, 1985)
    - †Intyrictis vanvaleni (MacIntyre, 1966)
  - Genus: †Pristinictis (Fox & Youzwyshyn, 1994)
    - †Pristinictis connata (Fox & Youzwyshyn, 1994)
  - Genus: †Protictis (Matthew, 1937)
    - †Protictis agastor (Gingerich & Winkler, 1985)
    - †Protictis haydenianus (Cope, 1882)
    - †Protictis minor (Meehan & Wilson, 2002)
    - †Protictis paralus (Holtzman, 1978)
    - †Protictis simpsoni (Meehan & Wilson, 2002)
    - †Protictis aprophatos (Flynn & Galiano, 1982)
  - Genus: †Raphictis (Gingerich & Winkler, 1985)
    - †Raphictis gausion (Gingerich & Winkler, 1985)
    - †Raphictis iota (Scott, 2008)
    - †Raphictis machaera (Rankin, 2009)
    - †Raphictis nanoptexis (Rankin, 2009)
  - Incertae sedis:
    - †"Deltatherium" durini (Van Valen, 1978)
