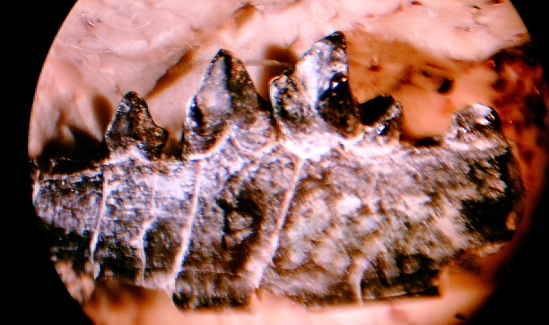
- lower jaw of Ictidopappus mustelinus

Scientific classification
- Kingdom: Animalia
- Phylum: Chordata
- Class: Mammalia
- Family: †Viverravidae
- Subfamily: †Ictidopappinae; Van Valen, 1969
- Genus: †Ictidopappus; Simpson, 1935

Type species
- †Ictidopappus mustelinus Simpson, 1935

Synonyms
- synonyms of subfamily: Ictidopappini (Van Valen, 1969)

= Ictidopappus =

Ictidopappus Temporal range: 63.8–60.9 Ma early Paleocene

Extinct genus of carnivores

Ictidopappus ("grandfather of weasels") is an extinct genus of mammals from extinct subfamily Ictidopappinae within extinct family Viverravidae, that lived in North America during the early Paleocene.
