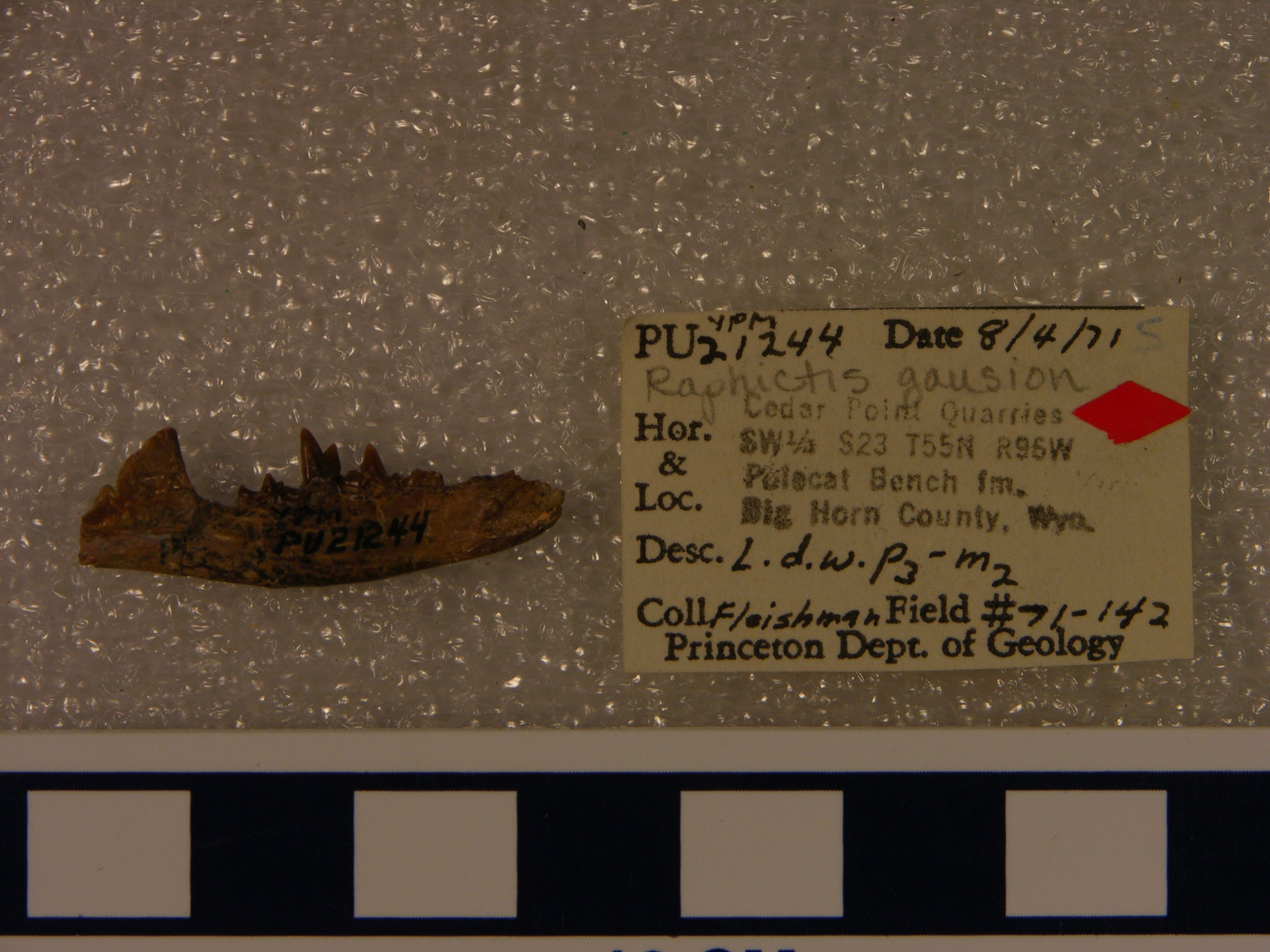
- lower jaw of Raphictis gausion

Scientific classification
- Kingdom: Animalia
- Phylum: Chordata
- Class: Mammalia
- Superfamily: †Viverravoidea
- Family: †Viverravidae
- Subfamily: †Didymictinae
- Genus: †Raphictis; Gingerich & Winkler, 1985

Type species
- †Raphictis gausion Gingerich & Winkler, 1985

Species
- †R. gausion (Gingerich & Winkler, 1985); †R. iota (Scott, 2008); †R. machaera (Rankin, 2009); †R. nanoptexis (Rankin, 2009)

= Raphictis =

Raphictis Temporal range: 58.9–57.4 Ma late Paleocene

Extinct genus of carnivores

Raphictis ("needle weasel") is an extinct genus of placental mammals from extinct subfamily Didymictinae within extinct family Viverravidae, that lived in North America during late Paleocene.
