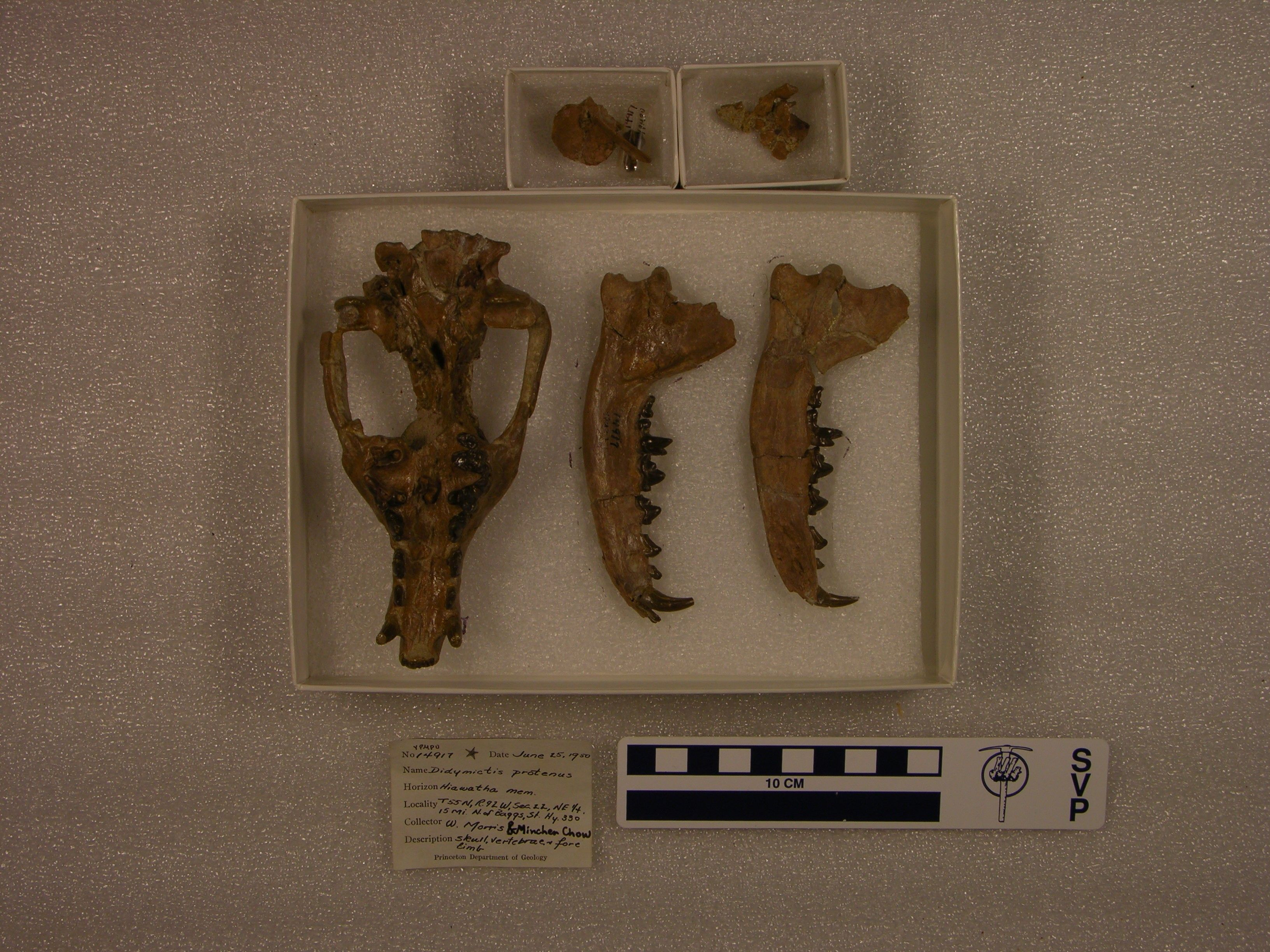
- Skull of Didymictis protenus

Scientific classification
- Kingdom: Animalia
- Phylum: Chordata
- Class: Mammalia
- Superfamily: †Viverravoidea
- Family: †Viverravidae
- Subfamily: †Didymictinae
- Genus: †Didymictis; Cope, 1875

Type species
- †Didymictis protenus Cope, 1874

Species
- [see classification]

Synonyms
- synonyms of species: D. altidens: Viverravus altidens (Cope, 1880); D. dellensis: Protictis dellensis (Dorr, 1952); D. leptomylus: Viverravus leptomylus (Cope, 1880); D. protenus: Didymictis curtidens (Cope, 1882); Limnocyon protenus (Cope, 1874); Viverravus curtidens (Cope, 1882); Viverravus protenus; D. proteus: Didymictis protenus proteus (Simpson, 1937)

= Didymictis =

Didymictis Temporal range: Late Paleocene—Middle Eocene (Thanetian to Lutetian), 60.9–46.2 Ma

Extinct genus of mammals

Didymictis ("double weasel") is an extinct genus of placental mammals from the extinct subfamily Didymictinae within the extinct family Viverravidae, that lived in North America and Europe from the Late Paleocene to Middle Eocene.

== Classification and phylogeny ==
=== History of species and classification ===
D. protenus is known from the earliest through late Wasatchian (early Eocene) of western North America. Cope assigned his specimen, "one entire and a portion of the other mandibular ramus, with teeth well preserved", to the creodont genus Limnocyon and named his new species L. protenus. Cope later created a new genus and renamed his species Didymictis protenus.

D. proteus is known from the Late Paleocene and earliest Eocene of Wyoming and the only species present in the Tiffanian and Clarkforkian stages. It is slightly larger than D. leptornylus and slightly smaller than D. protenus. Simpson in 1937 named a new subspecies, Didymictis protenus proteus, which Polly in 1997 reranked as the species D. proteus. Dorr in 1952 described Didymictis dellensis, which Gingerich and Winkler in 1985 included in Protictis dellensis. Polly in 1997 finally included these species in D. proteus.

D. leptomylus is known from the early Wasatchian of western North America, but by far fewer specimens than D. proteus.

D. vancleveae is known from a fragmented jaw with several teeth (Colorado) described by Robinson in 1966 and another tooth (Wyoming) tentatively assigned to this species. Robinson described D. vancleveae as larger than D. altidens and probably the youngest Didymicits. He assumed that the genus grew larger as it evolved.

=== Taxonomy ===
Genus: †Didymictis (Cope, 1875)
Species:	Distribution of the species and type locality:	Age:
†D. altidens (Cope, 1880)	USA (Colorado and Wyoming)	54,9 - 46,2 Ma
†D. dellensis (Dorr, 1952)	Canada (Saskatchewan); USA (Wyoming)	60,9 - 54,9 Ma
†D. leptomylus (Cope, 1880)	USA (Colorado and Wyoming)	54,9 - 50,5 Ma
†D. protenus (Cope, 1874)	USA (Colorado,New Mexico and Wyoming)	56,2 - 50,5 Ma
†D. proteus (Polly, 1997)	Canada (Alberta); USA (Colorado, South Carolina and Wyoming)	60,9 - 50,5 Ma
†D. vancleveae (Robinson, 1966)	USA (Colorado and Wyoming)	50,5 - 46,2 Ma
†D. sp. [Erquelinnes, Hainaut, Belgium] (Dollo, 1909)	Belgium (Hainaut Province)	56,0 - 55,2 Ma

== Description ==
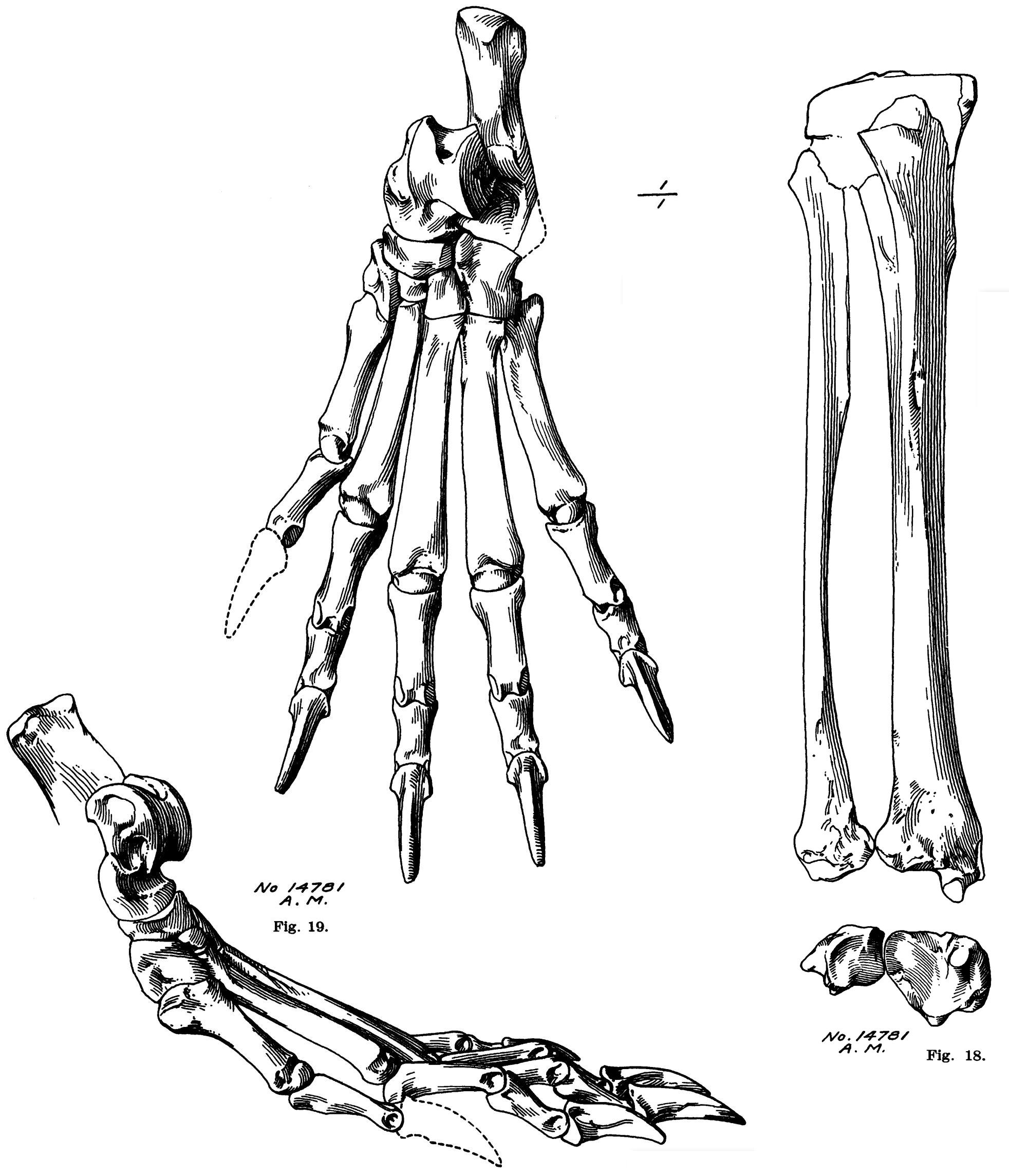
Postcrania of Didymictis

Didymictis is the only viverravid genus for which there are considerable postcranial remains. The genus was primarily terrestrial but at least partly cursorial, similar to a civets.

Didymictis had an elongated and relatively large skull with small and low braincase and a long and narrow basicranial region. The occipital and sagittal crests are very high. The limbs are of moderate length with subdigitigrade and five-toed feet. The dentition (3.1.4.23.1.4.2) contrasts those of basal carnivoraforms by the sharp differentiation between sectorial and tubercular dentition, the loss of the last molar and an elongated second molar, similar to the dentition in bears and raccoons. The permanent second mandibular premolar of Didymictis erupted before its third and fourth mandibular premolars, which erupted simultaneously; its first and second mandibular molars likewise erupted before the third and fourth premolars, while the permanent first maxillary molar's eruption preceded the eruption of the second, third, and fourth maxillary premolars.

Comparing Didymictis to Vulpavus, a much smaller and more agile carnivoraform, Heinrich and Rose in 1997 noted that Didymictis' limbs, especially the hindlimb, are similar to those in extant carnivorans adapted for speed, and the forelimbs to some extent are specialized to digging. The authors concluded that Didymictis was a relatively specialized terrestrial carnivore capable of hunting with speed or pursuing by digging.
