= Pass Peak Formation =

Geologic formation in Wyoming, United States

- Stratigraphic range: Ypresian (Wasatchian); ~55.8–50 Ma
- Type: Formation

Location
- Coordinates: 42.7°N 110.1°W
- Approximate paleocoordinates: 47.7°N 93.5°W
- Region: Wyoming
- Country: United States
- Extent: Green River Basin
- Pass Peak Formation (the United States) Pass Peak Formation (Wyoming)

The Pass Peak Formation is a Wasatchian geologic formation in Wyoming. It preserves fossils dating back to the Ypresian stage of the Eocene period.

== Fossil content ==
The following fossils have been found in the formation:

=== Mammals ===
Artiodactyls

- Diacodexis sp.

Erinaceomorpha

- Diacodon celatus

Glires

- Paramys copei

Macroscelidea

- Adapisoricidae indet.

Perissodactyla

- Hyracotherium cf. vasacciense

Placentalia

- Hyopsodus cf. wortmani

== Wasatchian correlations ==
Wasatchian correlations in North America
Formation	Wasatch	DeBeque	Claron	Indian Meadows	Pass Peak	Tatman	Willwood	Golden Valley	Coldwater	Allenby	Kamloops	Ootsa Lake	Margaret	Nanjemoy	Hatchetigbee	Tetas de Cabra	Hannold Hill	Coalmont	Cuchara	Galisteo	San Jose	Ypresian (IUCS) • Itaboraian (SALMA) Bumbanian (ALMA) • Mangaorapan (NZ)
Basin	Powder River Uinta Piceance Colorado Plateau Wind River Green River Bighorn	Piceance	Colorado Plateau	Wind River	Green River	Bighorn		Williston	Okanagan	Princeton	Buck Creek	Nechako	Sverdrup	Potomac	GoM	Laguna Salada	Rio Grande	North Park	Raton	Galisteo	San Juan	Pass Peak Formation (North America)
Country	United States								Canada					United States		Mexico	United States					Pass Peak Formation (North America)
Copelemur																						Pass Peak Formation (North America)
Coryphodon																						Pass Peak Formation (North America)
Diacodexis																						Pass Peak Formation (North America)
Homogalax																						Pass Peak Formation (North America)
Oxyaena																						Pass Peak Formation (North America)
Paramys																						Pass Peak Formation (North America)
Primates																						Pass Peak Formation (North America)
Birds																						Pass Peak Formation (North America)
Reptiles																						Pass Peak Formation (North America)
Fish																						Pass Peak Formation (North America)
Insects																						Pass Peak Formation (North America)
Flora																						Pass Peak Formation (North America)
Environments	Alluvial-fluvio-lacustrine	Fluvial				Fluvial	Fluvio-lacustrine	Fluvial	Lacustrine		Fluvio-lacustrine		Deltaic-paludal	Shallow marine		Fluvial	Shallow marine	Fluvial		Fluvial		Wasatchian volcanoclastics Wasatchian fauna Wasatchian flora
Volcanic	Yes	No							Yes	No	Yes	No	Yes	No						Yes	No	Wasatchian volcanoclastics Wasatchian fauna Wasatchian flora

== See also ==
- List of fossiliferous stratigraphic units in Wyoming
- Paleontology in Wyoming
