= Hannold Hill Formation =

Geologic unit in the western United States

- Stratigraphic range: Wasatchian; 55.8–50 Ma
- Type: Geological formation
- Unit of: Tornillo Group

Location
- Coordinates: 29.4°N 103.1°W
- Approximate paleocoordinates: 33.7°N 89.0°W
- Region: Texas
- Country: United States

Type section
- Named for: Hannold Hill
- Hannold Hill Formation (the United States) Hannold Hill Formation (Texas)

The Hannold Hill Formation is an Early Eocene (Wasatchian) geologic unit in the western United States. It preserves the fossilized remains of the ray Myliobatis and gar.

== Fossil content ==
The following fossils have been reported from the formation:

Glires

- Paramys excavatus

Pantodonta

- Caenolambda jepseni
- Coryphodon armatus
- Coryphodon sp.

Perissodactyla

- Hyracotherium vasacciense
- Minippus index

Placentalia

- Hyopsodus cf. wortmani
- Hyopsodus sp.
- Phenacodus sp.

Primates

- Phenacolemurinae indet.

== Wasatchian correlations ==
Wasatchian correlations in North America
Formation	Wasatch	DeBeque	Claron	Indian Meadows	Pass Peak	Tatman	Willwood	Golden Valley	Coldwater	Allenby	Kamloops	Ootsa Lake	Margaret	Nanjemoy	Hatchetigbee	Tetas de Cabra	Hannold Hill	Coalmont	Cuchara	Galisteo	San Jose	Ypresian (IUCS) • Itaboraian (SALMA) Bumbanian (ALMA) • Mangaorapan (NZ)
Basin	Powder River Uinta Piceance Colorado Plateau Wind River Green River Bighorn	Piceance	Colorado Plateau	Wind River	Green River	Bighorn		Williston	Okanagan	Princeton	Buck Creek	Nechako	Sverdrup	Potomac	GoM	Laguna Salada	Rio Grande	North Park	Raton	Galisteo	San Juan	Hannold Hill Formation (North America)
Country	United States								Canada					United States		Mexico	United States					Hannold Hill Formation (North America)
Copelemur																						Hannold Hill Formation (North America)
Coryphodon																						Hannold Hill Formation (North America)
Diacodexis																						Hannold Hill Formation (North America)
Homogalax																						Hannold Hill Formation (North America)
Oxyaena																						Hannold Hill Formation (North America)
Paramys																						Hannold Hill Formation (North America)
Primates																						Hannold Hill Formation (North America)
Birds																						Hannold Hill Formation (North America)
Reptiles																						Hannold Hill Formation (North America)
Fish																						Hannold Hill Formation (North America)
Insects																						Hannold Hill Formation (North America)
Flora																						Hannold Hill Formation (North America)
Environments	Alluvial-fluvio-lacustrine	Fluvial				Fluvial	Fluvio-lacustrine	Fluvial	Lacustrine		Fluvio-lacustrine		Deltaic-paludal	Shallow marine		Fluvial	Shallow marine	Fluvial		Fluvial		Wasatchian volcanoclastics Wasatchian fauna Wasatchian flora
Volcanic	Yes	No							Yes	No	Yes	No	Yes	No						Yes	No	Wasatchian volcanoclastics Wasatchian fauna Wasatchian flora
