= Las Tetas de Cabra Formation =

Geological formation in Baja California, Mexico

- Stratigraphic range: Wasatchian; ~55.8–50 Ma
- Type: Formation

Lithology
- Primary: Sandstone
- Other: Siltstone

Location
- Coordinates: 28.7°N 114.1°W
- Approximate paleocoordinates: 31.1°N 97.0°W
- Region: Baja California
- Country: Mexico

Type section
- Named for: Loma las Tetas de Cabra
- Las Tetas de Cabra Formation (Mexico)

The Las Tetas de Cabra Formation is a geologic formation in Mexico. It preserves fossils dating back to the Wasatchian of the Early Eocene period.

== Fossil content ==
The following fossils have been reported from the formation:

=== Mammals ===
Acreodi

- Dissacus sp.
- Wyolestes iglesius

Artiodactyls

- Diacodexis cf. gracilis

Cimolesta

- cf. Esthonyx sp.

Didelphimorphia

- Esteslestes ensis

Ferae

- cf. Oxyaena sp.

Glires

- ?Paramyidae indet.

Hyaenodonta

- Prolimnocyon sp.

Pantodonta

- Caenolambda jepseni

Perissodactyls

- Eohippus cf. angustidens

Placentalia

- Ectocion ignotum
- Meniscotherium chamense
- Phenacodus vortmani
- cf. Hyopsodus sp.

Theriiformes

- Ferae indet.

=== Reptiles ===
- cf. Saniwa sp.
- Boidae indet.
- Iguanidae indet.

=== Amphibians ===
- Caudata indet.

=== Fish ===
- cf. Galeorhinus sp.

=== Invertebrates ===
Gastropods

- Gastropoda indet.

=== Flora ===
- Celtis sp.
- Chenopodiaceae indet.
- Heliantheae indet.
- Ulmaceae indet.

== Wasatchian correlations ==
Wasatchian correlations in North America
Formation	Wasatch	DeBeque	Claron	Indian Meadows	Pass Peak	Tatman	Willwood	Golden Valley	Coldwater	Allenby	Kamloops	Ootsa Lake	Margaret	Nanjemoy	Hatchetigbee	Tetas de Cabra	Hannold Hill	Coalmont	Cuchara	Galisteo	San Jose	Ypresian (IUCS) • Itaboraian (SALMA) Bumbanian (ALMA) • Mangaorapan (NZ)
Basin	Powder River Uinta Piceance Colorado Plateau Wind River Green River Bighorn	Piceance	Colorado Plateau	Wind River	Green River	Bighorn		Williston	Okanagan	Princeton	Buck Creek	Nechako	Sverdrup	Potomac	GoM	Laguna Salada	Rio Grande	North Park	Raton	Galisteo	San Juan	Las Tetas de Cabra Formation (North America)
Country	United States								Canada					United States		Mexico	United States					Las Tetas de Cabra Formation (North America)
Copelemur																						Las Tetas de Cabra Formation (North America)
Coryphodon																						Las Tetas de Cabra Formation (North America)
Diacodexis																						Las Tetas de Cabra Formation (North America)
Homogalax																						Las Tetas de Cabra Formation (North America)
Oxyaena																						Las Tetas de Cabra Formation (North America)
Paramys																						Las Tetas de Cabra Formation (North America)
Primates																						Las Tetas de Cabra Formation (North America)
Birds																						Las Tetas de Cabra Formation (North America)
Reptiles																						Las Tetas de Cabra Formation (North America)
Fish																						Las Tetas de Cabra Formation (North America)
Insects																						Las Tetas de Cabra Formation (North America)
Flora																						Las Tetas de Cabra Formation (North America)
Environments	Alluvial-fluvio-lacustrine	Fluvial				Fluvial	Fluvio-lacustrine	Fluvial	Lacustrine		Fluvio-lacustrine		Deltaic-paludal	Shallow marine		Fluvial	Shallow marine	Fluvial		Fluvial		Wasatchian volcanoclastics Wasatchian fauna Wasatchian flora
Volcanic	Yes	No							Yes	No	Yes	No	Yes	No						Yes	No	Wasatchian volcanoclastics Wasatchian fauna Wasatchian flora

== See also ==
- List of fossiliferous stratigraphic units in Mexico
