= Coalmont Formation =

Geologic formation in Colorado, US

- Stratigraphic range: Paleocene-Wasatchian; ~60–50 Ma
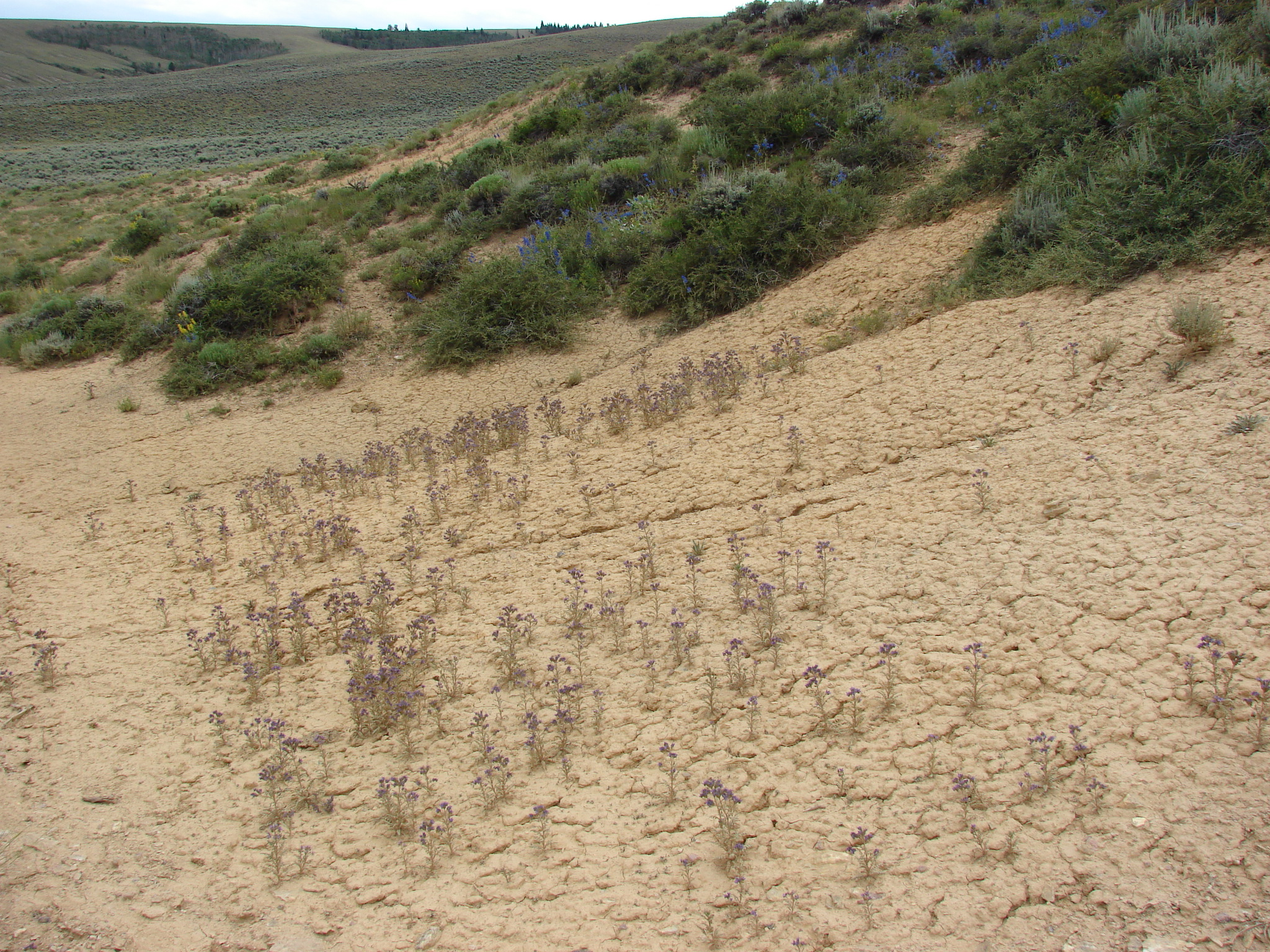
- Coalmont Formation, Jackson County, Colorado
- Type: Formation
- Underlies: North Park Formation
- Overlies: Cretaceous strata
- Thickness: 9,000 feet (2,700 m)

Lithology
- Primary: Sandstone
- Other: Clay, Shale, Coal

Location
- Coordinates: 40.4°N 106.5°W
- Approximate paleocoordinates: 45.0°N 90.3°W
- Region: Colorado
- Country: United States
- Extent: North Park intermountain basin

Type section
- Named for: Coalmont, Jackson County, Colorado
- Named by: A. L. Beekly
- Coalmont Formation (the United States) Coalmont Formation (Colorado)

The Coalmont Formation (Tmc) is a geologic formation that outcrops in the North Park intermountain basin in Colorado. It contains fossil plants and coal layers dating back to the Paleogene period.

== Fossil content ==
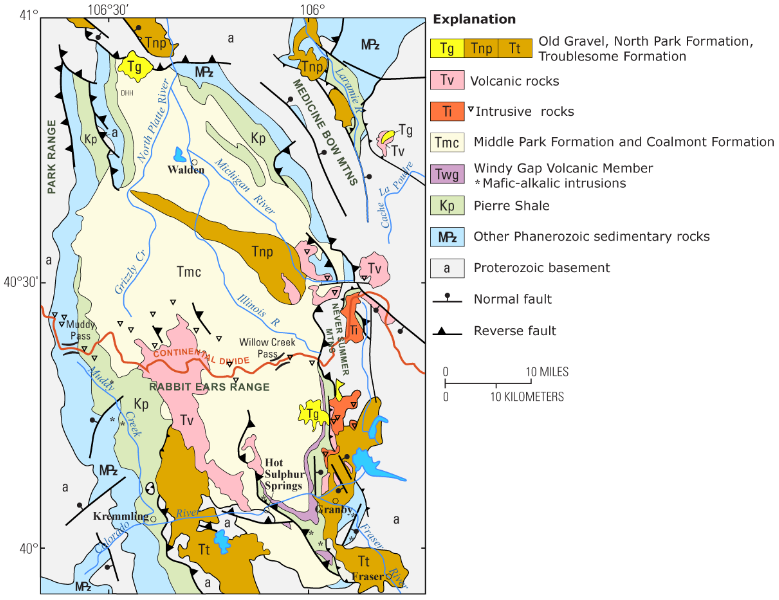
Geologic map of the North Park Basin with the Coalmont Formation indicated in light green (Tmc)

The following fossils have been reported from the formation:

=== Insects ===
- Calandrites hindsi
- ?Calandrites ursorum
- ?Carabites arapahoensis
- Curculio beeklyi
- Ophryastites hendersoni

=== Flora ===
- Allantodiopsis erosa
- Ampelopsis acerifolia
- Betula stevensoni
- Carya antiquorum
- Cercidiphyllum arcticum
- Cissus marginata
- Eucommia serrata
- Fraxinus eocenica
- Glyptostrobus nordenskioldi
- Hydromystria expansa
- Lastrea goldiana
- Laurophyllum perseanum
- Laurus socialis
- Lygodium coloradense
- Metasequoia occidentalis
- Mimosites coloradensis
- Nordenskioldia borealis
- Persea brossiana
- Platanus nobilis
- P. raynoldsi
- Prunus corrugis
- Pterocarya hispida
- Quercus greenlandica
- Q. sullyi
- ?Robinia wardi
- Sassafras thermale
- Sparganium antiquum

== Wasatchian correlations ==
Wasatchian correlations in North America
Formation	Wasatch	DeBeque	Claron	Indian Meadows	Pass Peak	Tatman	Willwood	Golden Valley	Coldwater	Allenby	Kamloops	Ootsa Lake	Margaret	Nanjemoy	Hatchetigbee	Tetas de Cabra	Hannold Hill	Coalmont	Cuchara	Galisteo	San Jose	Ypresian (IUCS) • Itaboraian (SALMA) Bumbanian (ALMA) • Mangaorapan (NZ)
Basin	Powder River Uinta Piceance Colorado Plateau Wind River Green River Bighorn	Piceance	Colorado Plateau	Wind River	Green River	Bighorn		Williston	Okanagan	Princeton	Buck Creek	Nechako	Sverdrup	Potomac	GoM	Laguna Salada	Rio Grande	North Park	Raton	Galisteo	San Juan	Coalmont Formation (North America)
Country	United States								Canada					United States		Mexico	United States					Coalmont Formation (North America)
Copelemur																						Coalmont Formation (North America)
Coryphodon																						Coalmont Formation (North America)
Diacodexis																						Coalmont Formation (North America)
Homogalax																						Coalmont Formation (North America)
Oxyaena																						Coalmont Formation (North America)
Paramys																						Coalmont Formation (North America)
Primates																						Coalmont Formation (North America)
Birds																						Coalmont Formation (North America)
Reptiles																						Coalmont Formation (North America)
Fish																						Coalmont Formation (North America)
Insects																						Coalmont Formation (North America)
Flora																						Coalmont Formation (North America)
Environments	Alluvial-fluvio-lacustrine	Fluvial				Fluvial	Fluvio-lacustrine	Fluvial	Lacustrine		Fluvio-lacustrine		Deltaic-paludal	Shallow marine		Fluvial	Shallow marine	Fluvial		Fluvial		Wasatchian volcanoclastics Wasatchian fauna Wasatchian flora
Volcanic	Yes	No							Yes	No	Yes	No	Yes	No						Yes	No	Wasatchian volcanoclastics Wasatchian fauna Wasatchian flora

== See also ==
- Coalmont, Colorado
- List of fossiliferous stratigraphic units in Colorado
- Paleontology in Colorado
