= Hatchetigbee Bluff Formation =

Geologic formation in the southern United States

- Stratigraphic range: Ypresian (Wasatchian); ~55–50 Ma
- Type: Formation
- Unit of: Wilcox Group
- Sub-units: Bashi Member

Lithology
- Primary: Marl, sandstone
- Other: Shale, siltstone

Location
- Coordinates: 31.3°N 86.1°W
- Approximate paleocoordinates: 33.1°N 71.7°W
- Region: Alabama, Georgia, Louisiana, Mississippi
- Country: United States
- Extent: Gulf of Mexico Basin

Type section
- Named for: Hatchetigbee Bluff, Tombigbee River, Washington County, Alabama
- Named by: Smith & Johnson
- Year defined: 1887
- Hatchetigbee Bluff Formation (the United States) Hatchetigbee Bluff Formation (Alabama)

The Hatchetigbee Bluff Formation is a geologic formation in Alabama, Georgia, Louisiana and Mississippi. The youngest unit of the Wilcox Group preserves fossils dating back to the Ypresian stage of the Eocene period, or Wasatchian in the NALMA classification. The formation is named for Hatchetigbee Bluff on the Tombigbee River, Washington County, Alabama.

== Wasatchian correlations ==
Wasatchian correlations in North America
Formation	Wasatch	DeBeque	Claron	Indian Meadows	Pass Peak	Tatman	Willwood	Golden Valley	Coldwater	Allenby	Kamloops	Ootsa Lake	Margaret	Nanjemoy	Hatchetigbee	Tetas de Cabra	Hannold Hill	Coalmont	Cuchara	Galisteo	San Jose	Ypresian (IUCS) • Itaboraian (SALMA) Bumbanian (ALMA) • Mangaorapan (NZ)
Basin	Powder River Uinta Piceance Colorado Plateau Wind River Green River Bighorn	Piceance	Colorado Plateau	Wind River	Green River	Bighorn		Williston	Okanagan	Princeton	Buck Creek	Nechako	Sverdrup	Potomac	GoM	Laguna Salada	Rio Grande	North Park	Raton	Galisteo	San Juan	Hatchetigbee Bluff Formation (North America)
Country	United States								Canada					United States		Mexico	United States					Hatchetigbee Bluff Formation (North America)
Copelemur																						Hatchetigbee Bluff Formation (North America)
Coryphodon																						Hatchetigbee Bluff Formation (North America)
Diacodexis																						Hatchetigbee Bluff Formation (North America)
Homogalax																						Hatchetigbee Bluff Formation (North America)
Oxyaena																						Hatchetigbee Bluff Formation (North America)
Paramys																						Hatchetigbee Bluff Formation (North America)
Primates																						Hatchetigbee Bluff Formation (North America)
Birds																						Hatchetigbee Bluff Formation (North America)
Reptiles																						Hatchetigbee Bluff Formation (North America)
Fish																						Hatchetigbee Bluff Formation (North America)
Insects																						Hatchetigbee Bluff Formation (North America)
Flora																						Hatchetigbee Bluff Formation (North America)
Environments	Alluvial-fluvio-lacustrine	Fluvial				Fluvial	Fluvio-lacustrine	Fluvial	Lacustrine		Fluvio-lacustrine		Deltaic-paludal	Shallow marine		Fluvial	Shallow marine	Fluvial		Fluvial		Wasatchian volcanoclastics Wasatchian fauna Wasatchian flora
Volcanic	Yes	No							Yes	No	Yes	No	Yes	No						Yes	No	Wasatchian volcanoclastics Wasatchian fauna Wasatchian flora

== See also ==
- List of fossiliferous stratigraphic units in Alabama
- List of fossiliferous stratigraphic units in Georgia (U.S. state)
- List of fossiliferous stratigraphic units in Louisiana
- List of fossiliferous stratigraphic units in Mississippi
- Paleontology in Alabama
- Paleontology in Georgia (U.S. state)
- Paleontology in Louisiana
- Paleontology in Mississippi
