= DeBeque Formation =

Geologic formation in Colorado, United States

- Stratigraphic range: Late Paleocene-Early Eocene (Clarkforkian-Wasatchian); ~56–50 Ma
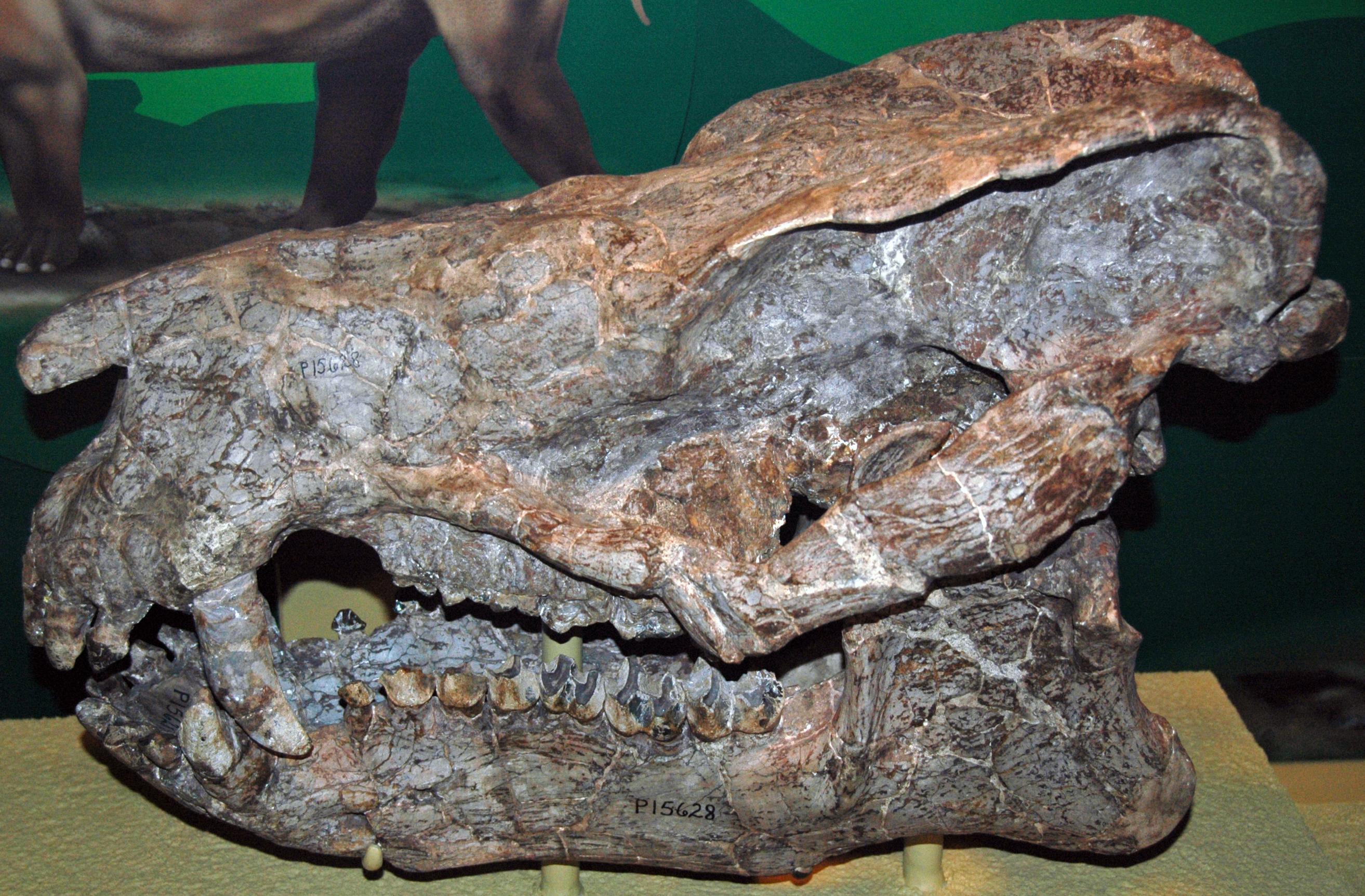
- Fossil from the DeBeque Formation
- Type: Formation
- Sub-units: Atwell Gulch Member

Lithology
- Primary: Claystone

Location
- Coordinates: 40.0°N 107.9°W
- Approximate paleocoordinates: 44.8°N 91.8°W
- Region: Colorado
- Country: United States
- DeBeque Formation (the United States) DeBeque Formation (Colorado)

The DeBeque Formation is a geologic formation in Colorado's Piceance Basin, preserving fossils which date back to the Late Paleocene to Early Eocene period (Clarkforkian to Wasatchian in the NALMA classification. Examples of these fossils are held in the University of Colorado Museum of Natural History.

== Wasatchian correlations ==
Wasatchian correlations in North America
Formation	Wasatch	DeBeque	Claron	Indian Meadows	Pass Peak	Tatman	Willwood	Golden Valley	Coldwater	Allenby	Kamloops	Ootsa Lake	Margaret	Nanjemoy	Hatchetigbee	Tetas de Cabra	Hannold Hill	Coalmont	Cuchara	Galisteo	San Jose	Ypresian (IUCS) • Itaboraian (SALMA) Bumbanian (ALMA) • Mangaorapan (NZ)
Basin	Powder River Uinta Piceance Colorado Plateau Wind River Green River Bighorn	Piceance	Colorado Plateau	Wind River	Green River	Bighorn		Williston	Okanagan	Princeton	Buck Creek	Nechako	Sverdrup	Potomac	GoM	Laguna Salada	Rio Grande	North Park	Raton	Galisteo	San Juan	DeBeque Formation (North America)
Country	United States								Canada					United States		Mexico	United States					DeBeque Formation (North America)
Copelemur																						DeBeque Formation (North America)
Coryphodon																						DeBeque Formation (North America)
Diacodexis																						DeBeque Formation (North America)
Homogalax																						DeBeque Formation (North America)
Oxyaena																						DeBeque Formation (North America)
Paramys																						DeBeque Formation (North America)
Primates																						DeBeque Formation (North America)
Birds																						DeBeque Formation (North America)
Reptiles																						DeBeque Formation (North America)
Fish																						DeBeque Formation (North America)
Insects																						DeBeque Formation (North America)
Flora																						DeBeque Formation (North America)
Environments	Alluvial-fluvio-lacustrine	Fluvial				Fluvial	Fluvio-lacustrine	Fluvial	Lacustrine		Fluvio-lacustrine		Deltaic-paludal	Shallow marine		Fluvial	Shallow marine	Fluvial		Fluvial		Wasatchian volcanoclastics Wasatchian fauna Wasatchian flora
Volcanic	Yes	No							Yes	No	Yes	No	Yes	No						Yes	No	Wasatchian volcanoclastics Wasatchian fauna Wasatchian flora

== See also ==
- List of fossiliferous stratigraphic units in Colorado
- Paleontology in Colorado
