= Tatman Formation =

Geologic formation in Wyoming, United States

- Stratigraphic range: Ypresian (Lostcabinian); ~55.8–50 Ma
- Type: Formation

Lithology
- Primary: Shale

Location
- Coordinates: 44.2°N 108.6°W
- Approximate paleocoordinates: 49.0°N 91.5°W
- Region: Wyoming
- Country: United States
- Extent: Bighorn Basin
- Tatman Formation (the United States) Tatman Formation (Wyoming)

The Tatman Formation is a Wasatchian geologic formation in Wyoming. It preserves fossils dating back to the Ypresian stage of the Eocene period.

== Fossil content ==
The following fossils have been recovered from the formation:

=== Flora ===
- Allantoidiopsis erosa
- Cercidiphyllum genetrix
- Cnemidaria magna
- Dombeya novimundi
- Eugenia americana
- Lygodium kaulfussi
- Platanus wyomingensis
- Platycarya castaneopsis
- Populus meigsii
- Salvinia preauriculata
- Thelypteris iddingsii
- Zingiberopsis isonervosa
- Alnus sp.
- Equisetum sp.
- aff. Typha sp.
- Alismataceae indet.
- Monocotyledoneae indet.

== Wasatchian correlations ==
Wasatchian correlations in North America
Formation	Wasatch	DeBeque	Claron	Indian Meadows	Pass Peak	Tatman	Willwood	Golden Valley	Coldwater	Allenby	Kamloops	Ootsa Lake	Margaret	Nanjemoy	Hatchetigbee	Tetas de Cabra	Hannold Hill	Coalmont	Cuchara	Galisteo	San Jose	Ypresian (IUCS) • Itaboraian (SALMA) Bumbanian (ALMA) • Mangaorapan (NZ)
Basin	Powder River Uinta Piceance Colorado Plateau Wind River Green River Bighorn	Piceance	Colorado Plateau	Wind River	Green River	Bighorn		Williston	Okanagan	Princeton	Buck Creek	Nechako	Sverdrup	Potomac	GoM	Laguna Salada	Rio Grande	North Park	Raton	Galisteo	San Juan	Tatman Formation (North America)
Country	United States								Canada					United States		Mexico	United States					Tatman Formation (North America)
Copelemur																						Tatman Formation (North America)
Coryphodon																						Tatman Formation (North America)
Diacodexis																						Tatman Formation (North America)
Homogalax																						Tatman Formation (North America)
Oxyaena																						Tatman Formation (North America)
Paramys																						Tatman Formation (North America)
Primates																						Tatman Formation (North America)
Birds																						Tatman Formation (North America)
Reptiles																						Tatman Formation (North America)
Fish																						Tatman Formation (North America)
Insects																						Tatman Formation (North America)
Flora																						Tatman Formation (North America)
Environments	Alluvial-fluvio-lacustrine	Fluvial				Fluvial	Fluvio-lacustrine	Fluvial	Lacustrine		Fluvio-lacustrine		Deltaic-paludal	Shallow marine		Fluvial	Shallow marine	Fluvial		Fluvial		Wasatchian volcanoclastics Wasatchian fauna Wasatchian flora
Volcanic	Yes	No							Yes	No	Yes	No	Yes	No						Yes	No	Wasatchian volcanoclastics Wasatchian fauna Wasatchian flora

== See also ==
- List of fossiliferous stratigraphic units in Wyoming
- Paleontology in Wyoming
- Wasatch Formation
- Willwood Formation
