= Cuchara Formation =

Geologic formation in Colorado, US

- Stratigraphic range: Wasatchian; ~55.8–50 Ma
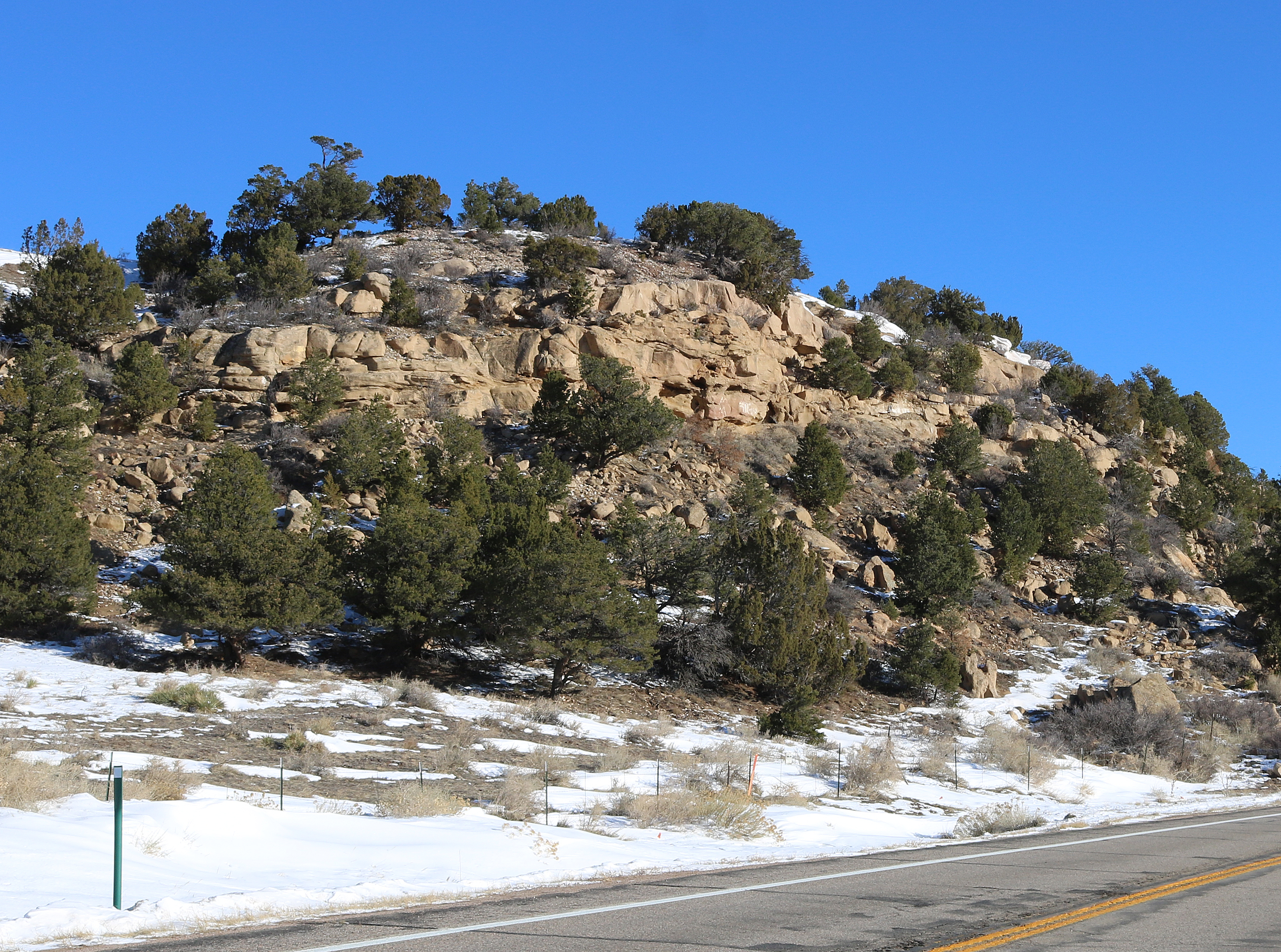
- Along Highway 12 just north of La Veta
- Type: Formation

Location
- Coordinates: 37.8°N 105.1°W
- Approximate paleocoordinates: 42.2°N 89.4°W
- Region: Colorado
- Country: United States
- Extent: Raton Basin
- Cuchara Formation (the United States) Cuchara Formation (Colorado)

The Cuchara Formation is a geologic formation in Colorado. It preserves fossils dating back to the Ypresian stage of the Eocene period, or Wasatchian in the NALMA classification.

== Fossil content ==
The following fossils have been reported from the formation:

=== Mammals ===
Ferae

- Didymictis sp.

Perissodactyla

- Hyracotherium sp.

Placentalia

- Phenacodus intermedius

== Wasatchian correlations ==
Wasatchian correlations in North America
Formation	Wasatch	DeBeque	Claron	Indian Meadows	Pass Peak	Tatman	Willwood	Golden Valley	Coldwater	Allenby	Kamloops	Ootsa Lake	Margaret	Nanjemoy	Hatchetigbee	Tetas de Cabra	Hannold Hill	Coalmont	Cuchara	Galisteo	San Jose	Ypresian (IUCS) • Itaboraian (SALMA) Bumbanian (ALMA) • Mangaorapan (NZ)
Basin	Powder River Uinta Piceance Colorado Plateau Wind River Green River Bighorn	Piceance	Colorado Plateau	Wind River	Green River	Bighorn		Williston	Okanagan	Princeton	Buck Creek	Nechako	Sverdrup	Potomac	GoM	Laguna Salada	Rio Grande	North Park	Raton	Galisteo	San Juan	Cuchara Formation (North America)
Country	United States								Canada					United States		Mexico	United States					Cuchara Formation (North America)
Copelemur																						Cuchara Formation (North America)
Coryphodon																						Cuchara Formation (North America)
Diacodexis																						Cuchara Formation (North America)
Homogalax																						Cuchara Formation (North America)
Oxyaena																						Cuchara Formation (North America)
Paramys																						Cuchara Formation (North America)
Primates																						Cuchara Formation (North America)
Birds																						Cuchara Formation (North America)
Reptiles																						Cuchara Formation (North America)
Fish																						Cuchara Formation (North America)
Insects																						Cuchara Formation (North America)
Flora																						Cuchara Formation (North America)
Environments	Alluvial-fluvio-lacustrine	Fluvial				Fluvial	Fluvio-lacustrine	Fluvial	Lacustrine		Fluvio-lacustrine		Deltaic-paludal	Shallow marine		Fluvial	Shallow marine	Fluvial		Fluvial		Wasatchian volcanoclastics Wasatchian fauna Wasatchian flora
Volcanic	Yes	No							Yes	No	Yes	No	Yes	No						Yes	No	Wasatchian volcanoclastics Wasatchian fauna Wasatchian flora

== See also ==
- List of fossiliferous stratigraphic units in Colorado
- Paleontology in Colorado
