= Wasatchian =

North American faunal stage

The Wasatchian North American Stage on the geologic timescale is the North American faunal stage according to the North American Land Mammal Ages chronology (NALMA), typically set from 55,000,000 to 50,100,000 years BP.

It is usually considered to be within the Eocene, more specifically the Early Eocene.

The Wasatchian is preceded by the Clarkforkian and followed by the Bridgerian NALMA stages.

== Definition ==
The age is named after the Wasatch Formation, a highly fossiliferous stratigraphic unit stretching across six of the United States from Idaho and Montana in the north through Utah and Wyoming to Colorado and New Mexico in the south.

== Substages ==
The Wasatchian is considered to contain the following substages:

- Sandcouleean: shares lower boundary with the beginning of the Wasatchian age and shares upper boundary with the base of the Graybullian.
- Graybullian: shares lower boundary with the end of the Sandcouleean subage and upper boundary with the base of the Lysitean.
- Lysitean: shares lower boundary with the end of the Graybullian subage and upper boundary with the base of the Lostcabinian.
- Lostcabinian: shares lower boundary with the end of the Lysitean subage and upper boundary with the beginning of the Bridgerian.

== Wasatchian correlations ==
Wasatchian correlations in North America
Formation	Wasatch	DeBeque	Claron	Indian Meadows	Pass Peak	Tatman	Willwood	Golden Valley	Coldwater	Allenby	Kamloops	Ootsa Lake	Margaret	Nanjemoy	Hatchetigbee	Tetas de Cabra	Hannold Hill	Coalmont	Cuchara	Galisteo	San Jose	Ypresian (IUCS) • Itaboraian (SALMA) Bumbanian (ALMA) • Mangaorapan (NZ)
Basin	Powder River Uinta Piceance Colorado Plateau Wind River Green River Bighorn	Piceance	Colorado Plateau	Wind River	Green River	Bighorn		Williston	Okanagan	Princeton	Buck Creek	Nechako	Sverdrup	Potomac	GoM	Laguna Salada	Rio Grande	North Park	Raton	Galisteo	San Juan	Wasatchian (North America)
Country	United States								Canada					United States		Mexico	United States					Wasatchian (North America)
Copelemur																						Wasatchian (North America)
Coryphodon																						Wasatchian (North America)
Diacodexis																						Wasatchian (North America)
Homogalax																						Wasatchian (North America)
Oxyaena																						Wasatchian (North America)
Paramys																						Wasatchian (North America)
Primates																						Wasatchian (North America)
Birds																						Wasatchian (North America)
Reptiles																						Wasatchian (North America)
Fish																						Wasatchian (North America)
Insects																						Wasatchian (North America)
Flora																						Wasatchian (North America)
Environments	Alluvial-fluvio-lacustrine	Fluvial				Fluvial	Fluvio-lacustrine	Fluvial	Lacustrine		Fluvio-lacustrine		Deltaic-paludal	Shallow marine		Fluvial	Shallow marine	Fluvial		Fluvial		Wasatchian volcanoclastics Wasatchian fauna Wasatchian flora
Volcanic	Yes	No							Yes	No	Yes	No	Yes	No						Yes	No	Wasatchian volcanoclastics Wasatchian fauna Wasatchian flora
