= Estancia Basin =

Endorheic basin in the United States

The Estancia Basin is an endorheic basin located in north-central New Mexico. The watershed covers portions of Santa Fe, Bernalillo, Torrance, and Lincoln counties. It has a total area of 2,400 square miles (6,200 km^{2}).
