= San Jose Formation =

Geologic formation in New Mexico, USA

- Stratigraphic range: Wasatchian; ~55.8–50 Ma
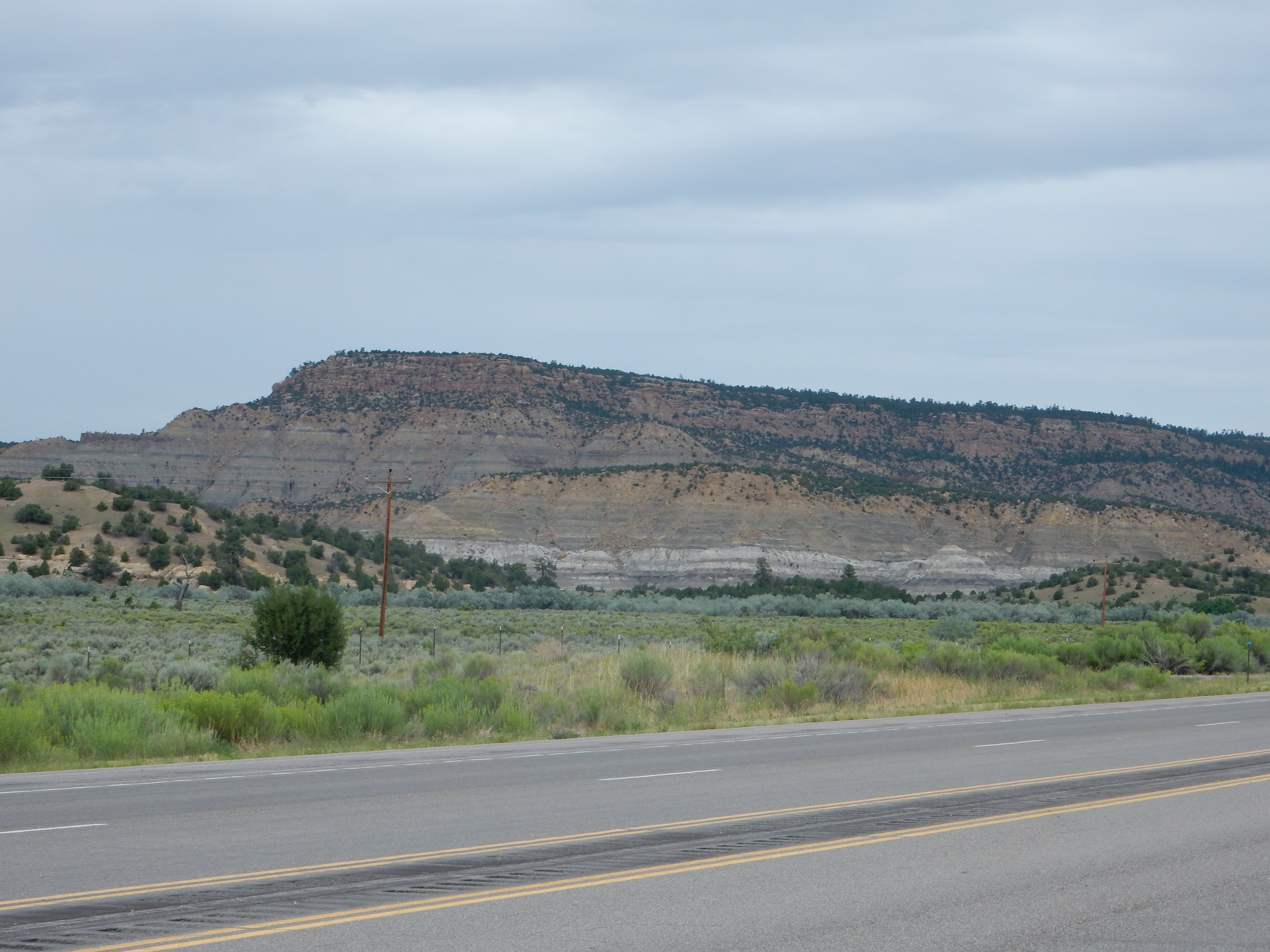
- San Jose Formation capping Mesa de Cuba, northern New Mexico
- Type: Formation
- Sub-units: Cuba Mesa, Ditch Canyon, Llaves, Regina & Tapicitos Members
- Overlies: Nacimiento Formation
- Thickness: 430 m (1,410 ft)

Lithology
- Primary: Sandstone
- Other: Shale

Location
- Coordinates: 36.29°N 107.06°W
- Approximate paleocoordinates: 41.2°N 91.7°W
- Region: New Mexico
- Country: United States
- Extent: San Juan Basin

Type section
- Named for: San Jose Valley (36.180°N 106.927°W)
- Named by: G.G. Simpson
- Year defined: 1948
- San Jose Formation (the United States) San Jose Formation (New Mexico)

The San Jose Formation is an Early Eocene (Wasatchian in the NALMA classification) geologic formation in the San Juan Basin of New Mexico and Colorado.

== Description ==
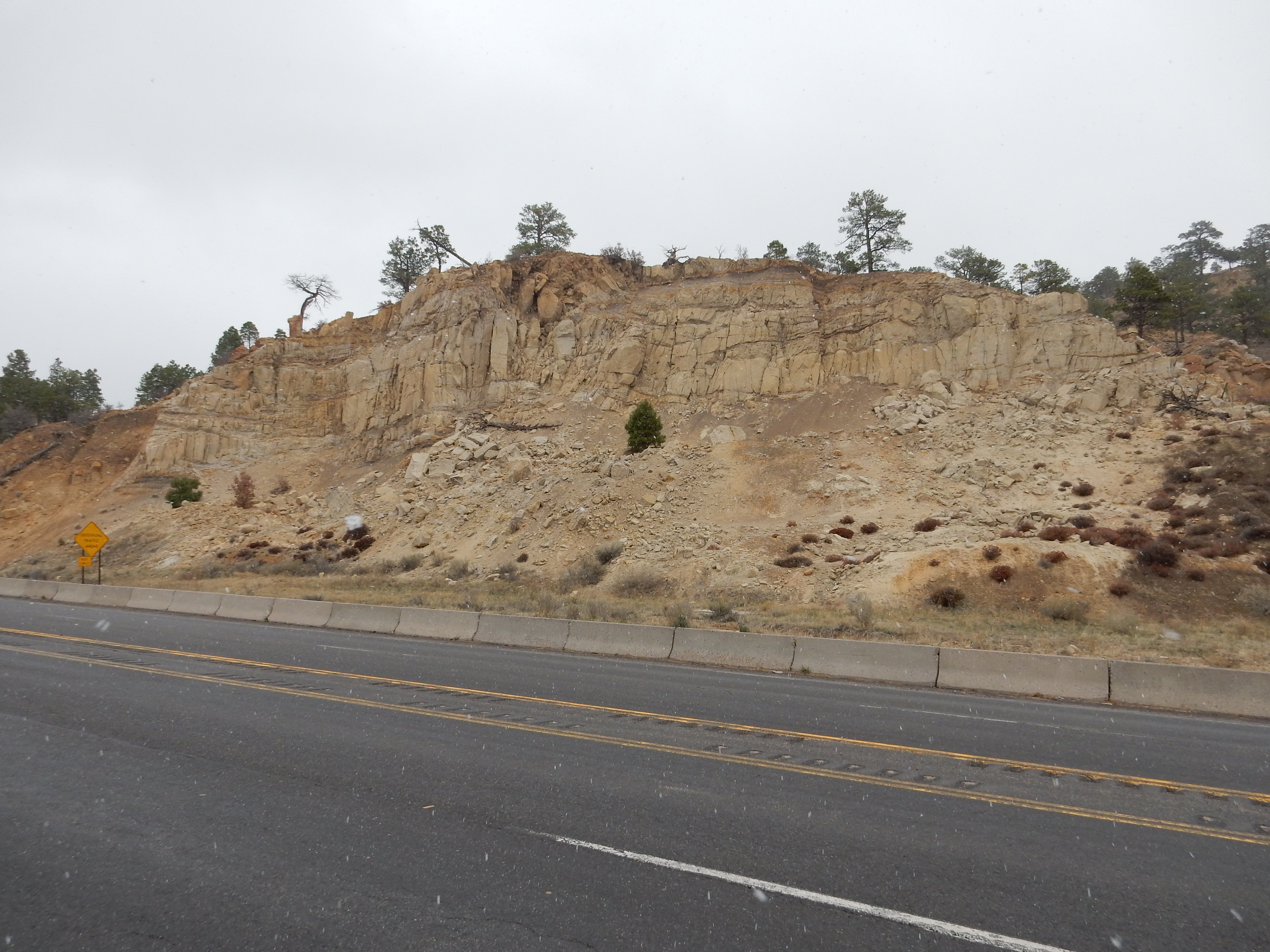
Road cut in the San Jose Formation, near Cuba, New Mexico

The San Jose Formation is mostly sandstone but with some mudstone beds. The formation was deposited by high-energy streams on a muddy floodplain that was the last preserved sedimentation episode in the San Juan Basin. Stream direction was from the northwest, north, and east towards the south.

The basal Cuba Mesa Member is found throughout the depositional basin and is a coarse-grained sheet sandstone. The Regina Member is floodplain mudstone and disconnected sheet sandstone that intertongues with the sandstone-dominated Ditch Canyon Member in the northwestern part of the basin and the Llaves Member on the east side of the basin. The uppermost member is the siltstone-dominated Tapicitos Member. The Cuba Mesa Member was deposited during subsidence in the basin center, while the later members were deposited during episodes of monoclinal folding along the Nacimiento Fault on the west escarpment of the Nacimiento Mountains.

== Paleontology ==
The mudstone beds of the San Jose Formation are locally rich in fossils. These include the Almagre and Largo faunas of the early Eocene.

=== Fossil content ===
Among others, the following fossils have been reported from the formation:

==== Mammals ====
Primates

- Copelemur tutus
- Cantius angulatus
- C. frugivorus
- Microsyops angustidens
- M. latidens
- Omomyidae indet.

Artiodactyls

- Bunophorus grangeri
- Diacodexis cf. metsiacus
- Simpsonodus chacensis

Carnivora

- Vulpavus australis

Cimolesta

- Esthonyx bisulcatus

Ferae

- Ambloctonus sinosus
- Oxyaena lupina
- O. simpsoni

Glires

- Knightomys depressus
- K. reginensis
- Paramys copei
- P. nini

Hyaenodonta

- Hyaenodontidae indet.

Insectivora

- Apatemys bellulus

Pantodonta

- Coryphodon armatus

Perissodactyla

- Eohippus angustidens
- Systemodon tapirinus
- Xenicohippus osborni

Placentalia

- Copecion brachypternus
- Hyopsodus lysitensis
- Hyopsodus cf. mentalis
- Hyopsodus minor
- Meniscotherium chamense
- M. tapiacitum
- Hyopsodus sp.

Taeniodonta

- Ectoganus gliriformis

Theriiformes

- Creodonta indet.

=== Reptiles ===
Snakes

- Cheilophis huerfanoensis
- Saniwa ensidens
- Sanjuanophis froehlichi
- cf. Calamagras primus
- cf. Saniwa sp.

Turtles

- Baena arenosa
- Baptemys garmanii
- Echmatemys lativertebralis
- Hadrianus majusculus
- Planetochelys dithyros
- Trionyx leptomitus
- Baltemys sp.
- Chelydridae indet.
- Trionychidae indet.

Lizards

- Paraglyptosaurus cf. yatkolai
- Lacertilia indet.

== History of investigation ==
In late 1874, Edward Drinker Cope was a member of the Wheeler Survey but ignored orders from Wheeler to proceed north from the Chama River to Colorado. Instead, he headed south to explore the area north of the San Pedro Mountains, where fossils had been reported. He found early Eocene fossils in the badlands north of Regina, New Mexico and spent about seven weeks collecting fishes, reptiles, and what was then the oldest known mammal fossils in North America. He also collected the fossil of a giant flightless bird. Cope later wrote his father that this was "the most important find in geology I have ever made".

In 1948, G.G. Simpson visited the same area and assigned the fossil beds to the San Jose Formation. In 1967, the formation was divided (in ascending order) into the Cuba Mesa Member, Regina Member, Llaves Member, and Tapicitos Member.

== See also ==
- List of fossiliferous stratigraphic units in Colorado
- List of fossiliferous stratigraphic units in New Mexico
- Paleontology in Colorado
- Paleontology in New Mexico
