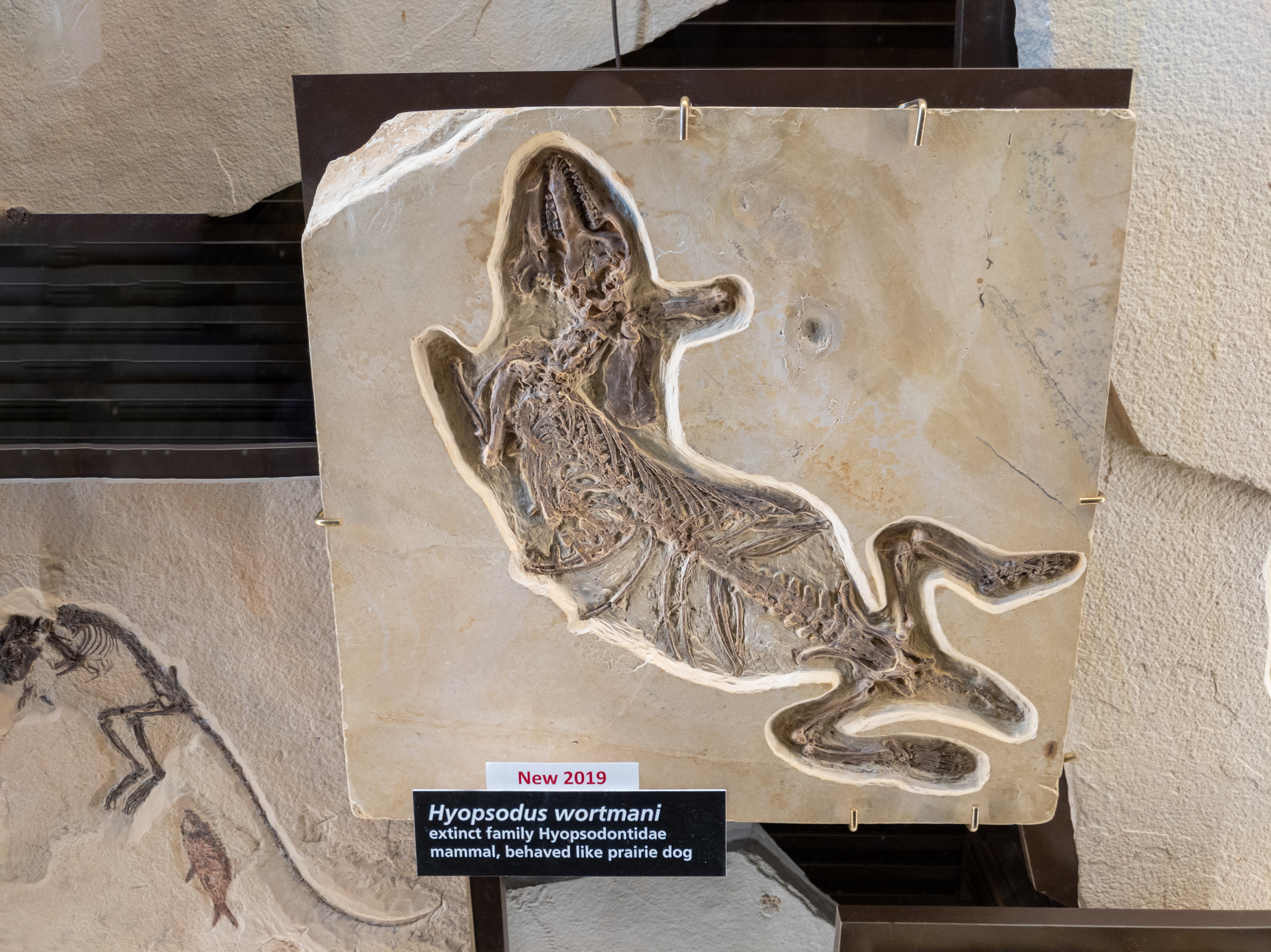
- H. wortmani fossil at Fossil Butte National Monument

Scientific classification
- Kingdom: Animalia
- Phylum: Chordata
- Class: Mammalia
- Family: †Hyopsodontidae
- Genus: †Hyopsodus; Leidy, 1870

Type species
- †Hyopsodus paulus

Species
- H. fangxianensis Huang, 1995; H. fastigatus Russell and Wickenden, 1933; H. huashigouensis Tong, 1989; H. itinerans Godinot, 1978; H. latidens Denison, 1937; H. lepidus Matthew, 1909; H. loomisi McKenna, 1960; H. lysitensis Gingerich, 1974; H. markmani Abel and Cook, 1925; H. mentalis Cope, 1875; H. minor Loomis, 1905; H. minusculus Leidy, 1873; H. miticulus Cope, 1874; H. paulus Leidy, 1870; H. pauxillus Gingerich, 1994; H. powellianus Cope, 1884; H. pygmaeus Cope, 1871; H. sholemi Krishtalka, 1979; H. simplex Loomis, 1905; H. tonksi Eaton, 1982; H. uintensis Osborn, 1902; H. walcottianus Matthew, 1915; H. wardi Hooker, 1979; H. wortmani Osborn, 1902

= Hyopsodus =

Hyopsodus Temporal range: Early Eocene 56–45 Ma

Extinct genus of mammals

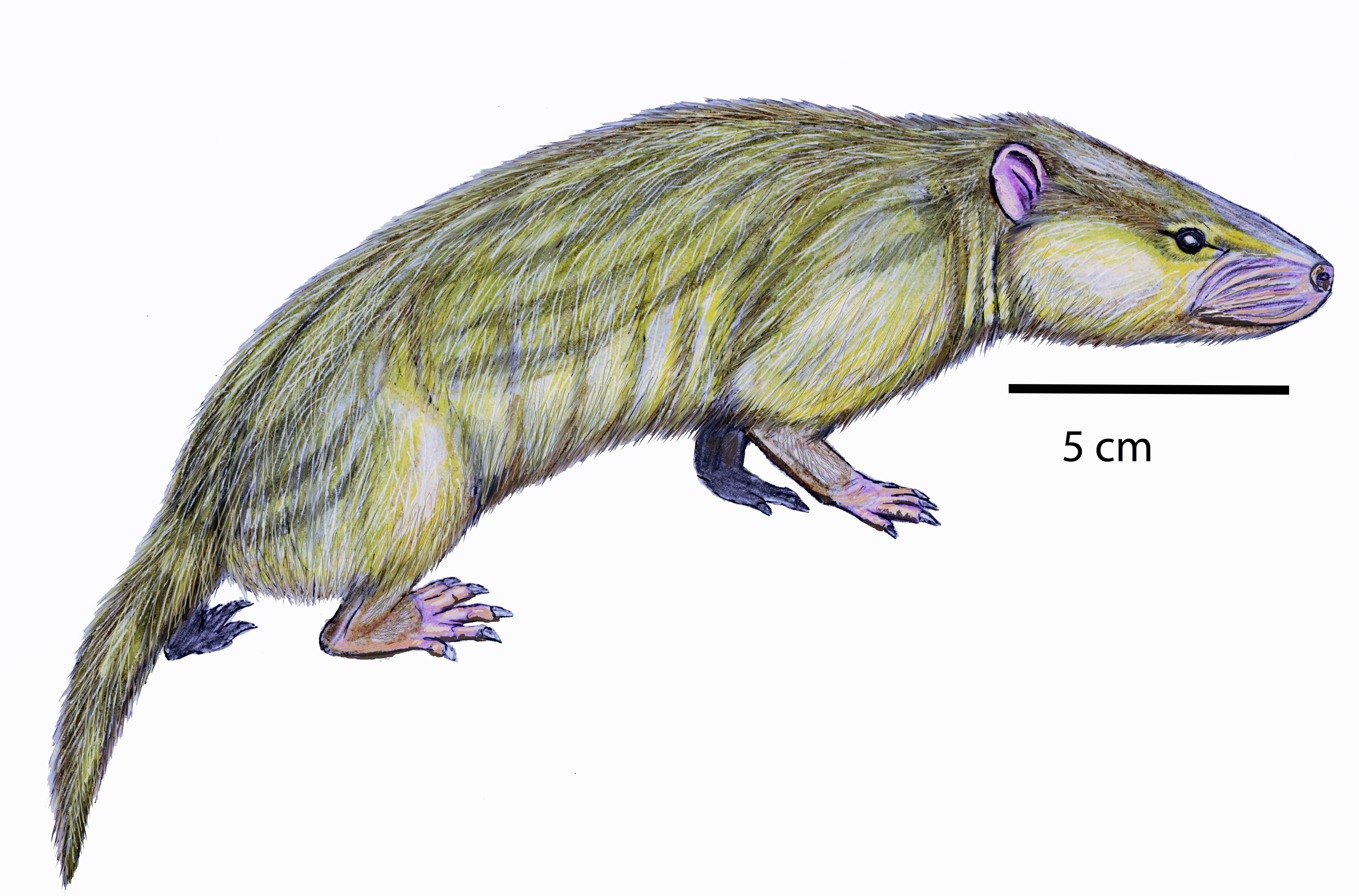
Restoration of Hyopsodus sp.

Hyopsodus is a genus of extinct early ungulate mammal of the family Hyopsodontidae, a group associated with or basal to the Perissodactyla. It was a small mammal with skull of about 6 cm in length. Fossils of this genus have been found in the Eocene of North America, especially the Bighorn Basin region of the United States. It has also been found in Eurasia.

== Taxonomy ==
Eighteen species of Hyopsodus have been described from North America, four from Asia, and two from Europe. The exact number and identity of species has been contested, as is common when taxa are erected based on fragmentary materials. However, there is broad agreement that multiple species in the genus lived in the Wasatchian, Uintan, and Bridgerian North American Land Mammal Ages, and they have been used both to reconstruct paleoenvironments and to study evolutionary change.

== Appearance and habits ==
Members of the genus had a long spinal column with short limbs and tail, making them one of the few genera of Paleogene mammal with a common name: "tube-sheep" Reconstructing their appearance in life was originally difficult, as remains are common but often consist only of fragmentary jaws or skulls and teeth. (In H. paulus, this preservation has been observed in predator coprolites, along with lizard scutes.) However, several whole individuals in the genus have been found beautifully preserved in life positions in lagerstatten in fossil lakes. They show Hyopsodus individuals had an arched back with a posture similar to a hyrax, rather than a weasel-like tube-shaped body.

Study of the limbs in H. lepidus has shown these animals were not adapted either for life as underground diggers like moles and groundhogs, or for life in the trees. However, they would have moved quickly on the ground, and could have dug for food or shelter as pigs and bandicoots do. An endocast of the brain of H. lepidus has shown it had an excellent sense of smell and an expanded ability to process sounds. Though they did not have a sophisticated echolocation system like bats, they may have had basic terrestrial echolocation to help them avoid or find objects in the dark, like modern shrews and tenrecs. It is likely H. lepidus was a nocturnal ground-dweller in damp closed forests and by the edges of lakes. H. wortmani had strong chest muscles and could have dug burrows or swum. The teeth of all species show they were omnivores; at least one species, H. lovei, had a battery of procumbent incisors worn by chewing, and likely had a specialized diet. Hyopsodus species may have occupied a variety of niches later taken by other flexible forest feeders such as rats, small early perissodactyls, and hypocarnivores like raccoons.
