= Golden Valley Formation =

Geologic formation in North Dakota

- Stratigraphic range: Late Paleocene-Early Eocene (Clarkforkian-Wasatchian); ~57–52 Ma
- Type: Geological formation
- Sub-units: Bear Den & Camels Butte Members
- Underlies: White River Group
- Overlies: Sentinel Butte Formation
- Thickness: up to 122 metres (400 ft)

Lithology
- Primary: Claystone, mudstone, siltstone, sandstone
- Other: Lignite, conglomerate

Location
- Coordinates: 48.5°N 102.7°W
- Approximate paleocoordinates: 52.9°N 82.2°W
- Region: North Dakota
- Country: United States
- Extent: Williston Basin

Type section
- Named for: Golden Valley, North Dakota
- Named by: Benson & Laird
- Year defined: 1947
- Golden Valley Formation (the United States) Golden Valley Formation (North Dakota)

The Golden Valley Formation is a stratigraphic unit of Late Paleocene to Early Eocene age in the Williston Basin of North Dakota. It is present in western North Dakota and was named for the city of Golden Valley by W.E. Benson and W.M. Laird in 1947. It preserves significant assemblages of fossil plants and vertebrates, as well as mollusk and insect fossils.

== History ==
The Golden Valley Formation was named in 1947.

Between 1958–61, a large field expedition conducted by the Yale Peabody Museum recovered a plethora of crocodilian remains from the White Butte and Turtle Valley sites (collectively referred to as the South Heart Locality) within the Golden Valley Formation.

== Stratigraphy ==
The Golden Valley Formation is present as a series of outliers in western North Dakota. It is underlain by the Sentinel Butte Formation and unconformably overlain by the White River Group. It reaches thicknesses of up to 122 metres (400 ft) and is subdivided into two members: the Bear Den Member (lower) and the Camels Butte Member (upper).

== Lithologies ==
The base of the Bear Den Member consists of kaolinitic claystone, mudstone and sandstone that weather to white, light grey, orange, and purple. These are overlain by grey or brownish carbonaceous sediments and, in some areas, a bed of lignite (the Alamo Bluff lignite). In places the sequence is capped by a siliceous bed (the Taylor bed) that represents a weathering surface or paleosol. The Bear Den Member reaches a maximum thickness of about 15 metres (50 ft).

The Camels Butte Member consists of montmorillonitic and micaceous claystone, siltstone, lignite, poorly cemented sandstone and conglomerate. The upper part includes a massive fluvial sandstone that caps many of the major buttes in southwestern North Dakota. The Camels Butte Member reaches a maximum thickness of about 107 metres (350 ft).

== Depositional environment ==
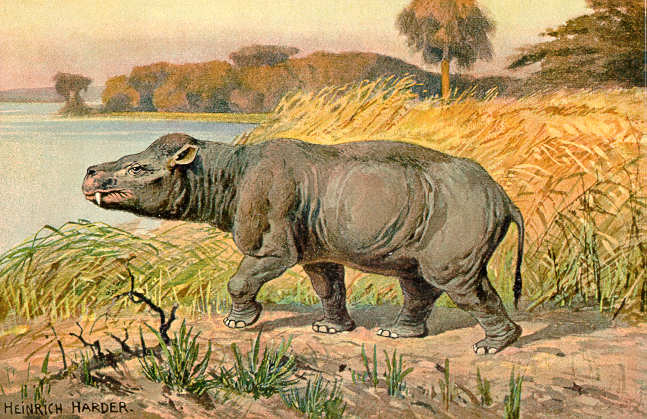
A Coryphodon: Restoration by Heinrich Harder

The Golden Valley Formation was deposited in a broad swampy lowland crossed by fluvial channels. Deposition occurred during late Paleocene (Clarkforkian) to early Eocene (Wasatchian) time, a period that spans the Paleocene-Eocene Thermal Maximum.

== Paleontology ==
Plant fossils collected from throughout the formation include floating and rooted aquatic plants such as Salvinia, Nelumbo and Isoetes, and lowland forest plants such as the ferns Onoclea and Osmunda, the conifers Glyptostrobus and Metasequoia, and the dicots Platanus and Cercidiphyllum.

The vertebrate fossils have come primarily from the upper, early Eocene Camels Butte Member. They include the remains of mammals such as Coryphodon, Hyracotherium, Homogalax, Sinopa, Didymictis, Hyopsodus, Paramys and others; there are also remains of fish, amphibians, and reptiles such as Trionyx, Peltosaurus, and four genera of crocodilians.

Invertebrate fossils include shells of freshwater mollusks such as Viviparus, Unio, Hydrobia, and Planorbis, and the wing casing of a crabid beetle.
