= Galisteo Basin =

Basin in New Mexico

Coordinates: 35°27′32″N 105°58′12″W

The Galisteo Basin (Tewa: Thanugeh) is a surface basin and a closely related groundwater basin in north-central New Mexico. Its primary watercourse is the Galisteo River or Galisteo Creek (Tewa: Thanugeˀin Kǫ́ Huuˀu, Eastern Keres: Kwé Chéna Há), a partially perennial stream which flows from the eastern highlands down into the Rio Grande about three miles above the Santo Domingo Pueblo. The Galisteo basin covers approximately 467,200 acres and runs from San Miguel County in the east, across Santa Fe County, and into Sandoval County at its westernmost point, the Rio Grande. Northeast of Galisteo Basin rise the Sangre de Cristo Mountains and to the southwest lie the Sandia Mountains. Because of its location lying between mountain ranges and connecting the upper Rio Grande Valley with the Great Plains, the Galisteo Basin was used as a trade route by prehistoric and historic indigenous and later also by the Spanish explorers.

== Geology ==
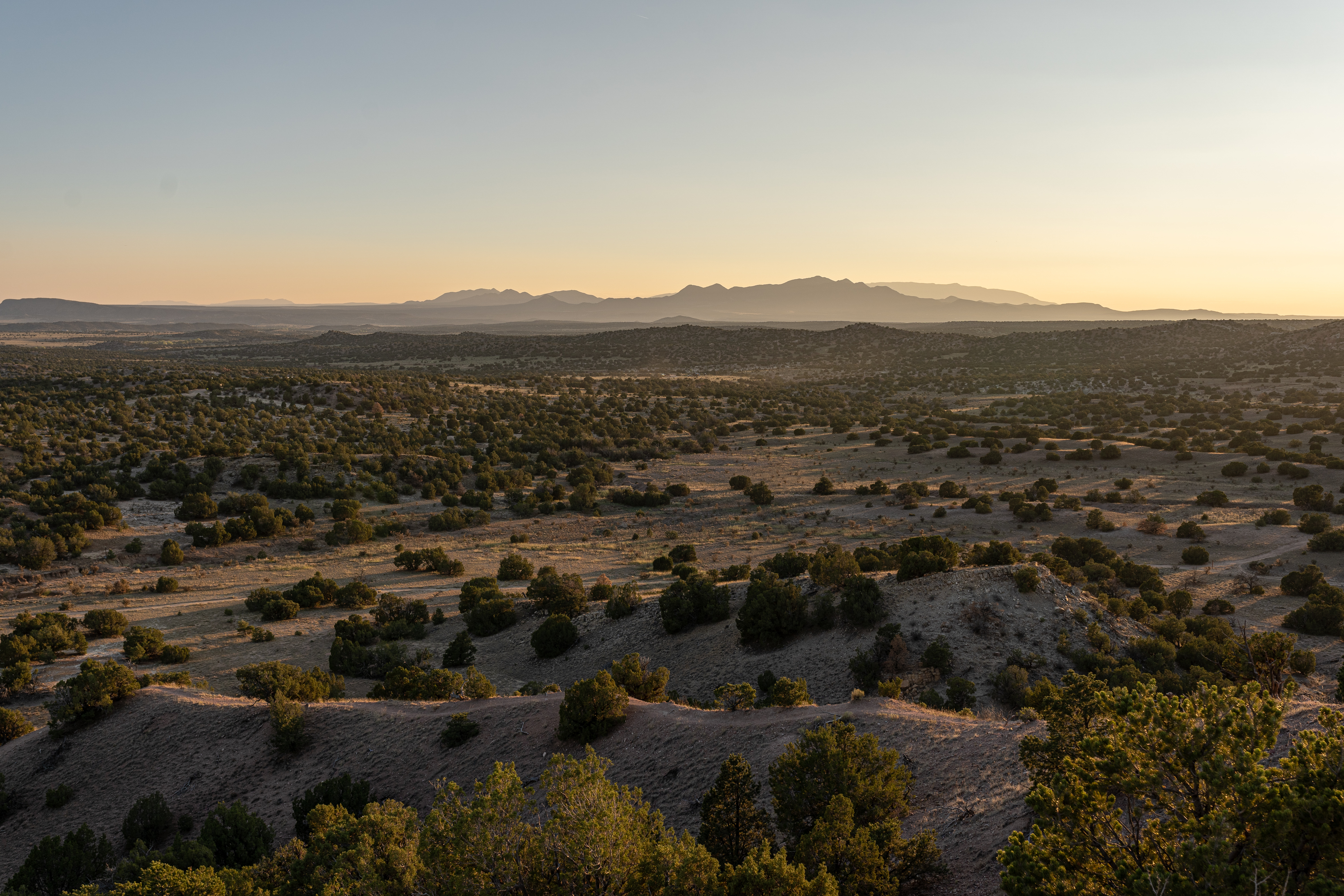
looking out over the Galisteo Basin at sunset

The Galisteo Basin drains the southern Sangre de Cristo Mountains, shares its northern drainage divide (height of land) with the Santa Fe Basin and its eastern drainage divide with the Pecos Basin. To the west it is bounded by the Rio Grande, and to the south by the drainage divide with the Estancia Basin, by the Ortiz Mountains. and the drainage divide with the Arroyo de la Vega de la Tanos, which flows off the western slopes of the Ortiz Mountains.

== Hydrology ==
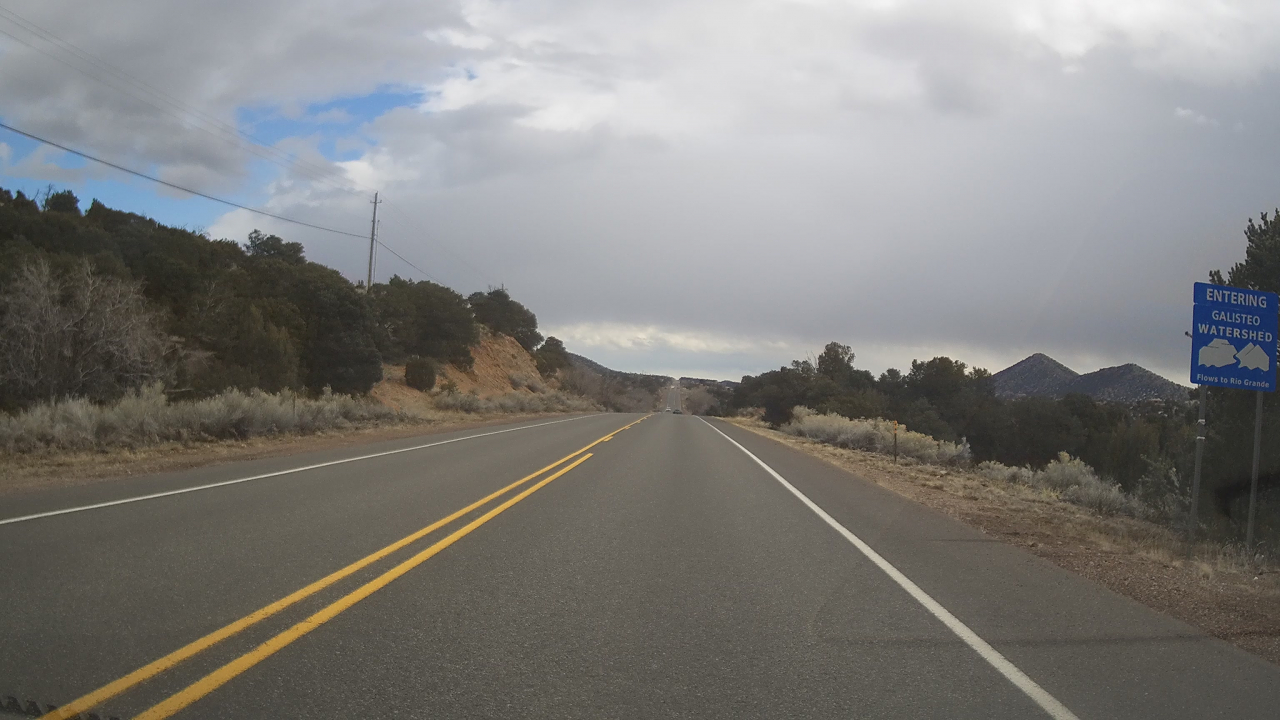
the rim of the Galisteo Basin closest to Santa Fe

The north fork of the Galisteo River arises in the southern Sangre de Cristo Mountains on the slopes of Thompson Peak and Glorieta Baldy. It includes flow from Grasshopper Canyon Creek, Deer Creek and Apache Canyon Creek. It is joined by the east fork just south of the town of Galisteo. The east fork of the Galisteo River, also known as the San Cristobal Arroyo, flows off of Rowe Mesa and Glorieta Mesa. A major tributary of the east fork is Padre Springs Creek. The south fork joins the river about 3.5 miles (5.6 km) below the east fork. The south fork of the Galisteo River, also known as the Arroyo de la Jara, drains from the eastern and southern slopes of the basin. Its major contributor is Gaviso Arroyo.

After the three fork join, the river flows northwest for about 30 miles (48 km) into the Rio Grande. The tracks of the BNSF railroad run beside the Galisteo River for most of this distance, turning south about 2 miles before the river enters the Rio Grande. After the three fork join, the river receives flow from the north off the height of land south of the city of Santa Fe, including Gallina Arroyo, San Marcos Arroyo and Canada de la Cueva. From the south it receives flow off the eastside of the Ortiz Mountains from Arroyo la Joya, Arroyo Canamo, Cunningham Creek, and Arroyo Viejo.

== History ==
The Galisteo Basin has a rich history of habitation by Puebloan peoples and is widely considered one of the most impressive archeological sites in the United States. Most of the sites are currently closed to the public. The most famous Pueblo ruin within the basin is San Cristobal Pueblo. From the 14th to the early 15th century, the pueblos in Galisteo Basin were trade centers. After 1680, the basin was abandoned. Various peoples, known and unknown, inhabited the area, including the Tano (Arizona Tewa), East Rio Grande Keresan, Pecos, and Tewa. The Cerrillos Turquoise Mines were located within the basin, with turquoise from the site being traded across the Indigenous Southwest.

== See also ==
- Ancestral Puebloans
- Galisteo, New Mexico
- Geography of the United States
- Pueblo
