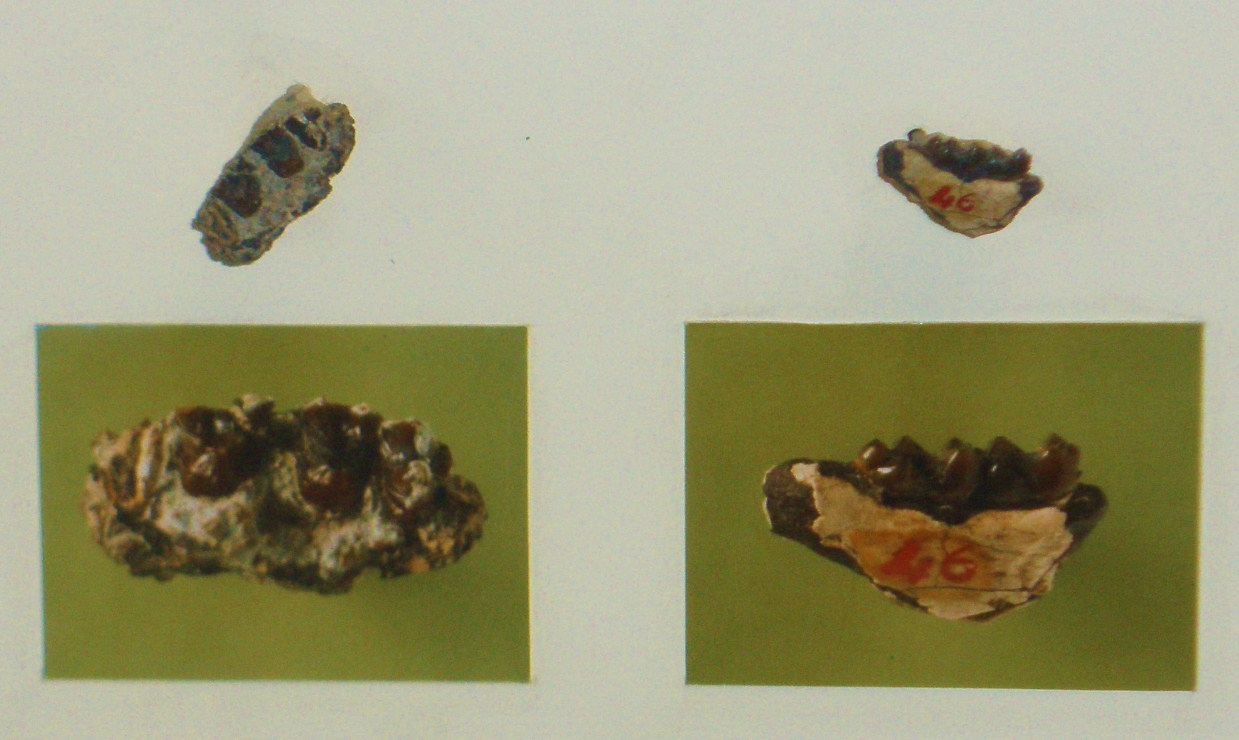
- Jaw fragments of Diacodexis
- Restoration of Diacodexis antunesi

Scientific classification
- Kingdom: Animalia
- Phylum: Chordata
- Class: Mammalia
- Order: Artiodactyla
- Family: †Diacodexeidae
- Genus: †Diacodexis; Cope, 1882

Species
- †D. antunesi; †D. gracilis; †D. ilicis; †D. kelleyi; †D. metsiacus; †D. minutus; †D. primus; †D. secans; †D. woltonensis; ?†D. absarokae

= Diacodexis =

Diacodexis Temporal range: Early Eocene (Wasatchian-Bridgerian) ~55.4–46.2 Ma

Extinct genus of Artiodactyls

Diacodexis is an extinct genus of small herbivorous mammals belonging to the family Diacodexeidae that lived in North America and Europe from 55.4 mya to 46.2 mya, existing for approximately 9.2 million years.

== Description ==
Diacodexis is the oldest known even-toed ungulate. In life, it would have resembled a modern duiker, measuring about 50 centimetres (1.6 ft) in body length, but with a much longer tail. Unlike most later species of artiodactyl, it still had five toes on each foot, although the third and fourth toes were already elongated. It may also have had small hooves on each toe. Its teeth suggest that it was a herbivorous browser.

D. ilicis possessed a very simple neocortex, characterised by an almond-shaped gyrus instead of parallel sulci as some earlier authors had believed.

As suggested by its long legs, Diacodexis is believed to have been fast-running, capable of leaping relatively far.

== Fossil distribution ==
Diacodexis was widespread, with fossils having been found throughout Europe and North America. However, the genus is currently considered paraphyletic, with the various species likely being a loose conglomerate of basal artiodactyls, rather than a natural grouping.
