= Copelemur =

Copelemur Temporal range: Early Eocene (Wasatchian-Bridgerian) ~50.3–46.2 Ma

Scientific classification
- Kingdom: Animalia
- Phylum: Chordata
- Class: Mammalia
- Order: Primates
- Suborder: Strepsirrhini
- Family: †Notharctidae
- Subfamily: †Notharctinae
- Genus: †Copelemur; Gingerich & Simons, 1977

Type species
- †Copelemur tutus Cope, 1877

Species
- C. australotutus; C. praetutus; C. tutus

Extinct genus of primates

Copelemur is a genus of adapiform primate that lived in North America during the early Eocene.
