= Wind River Basin =

Basin in Wyoming, United States

Coordinates: 43.1°N 107.8°W

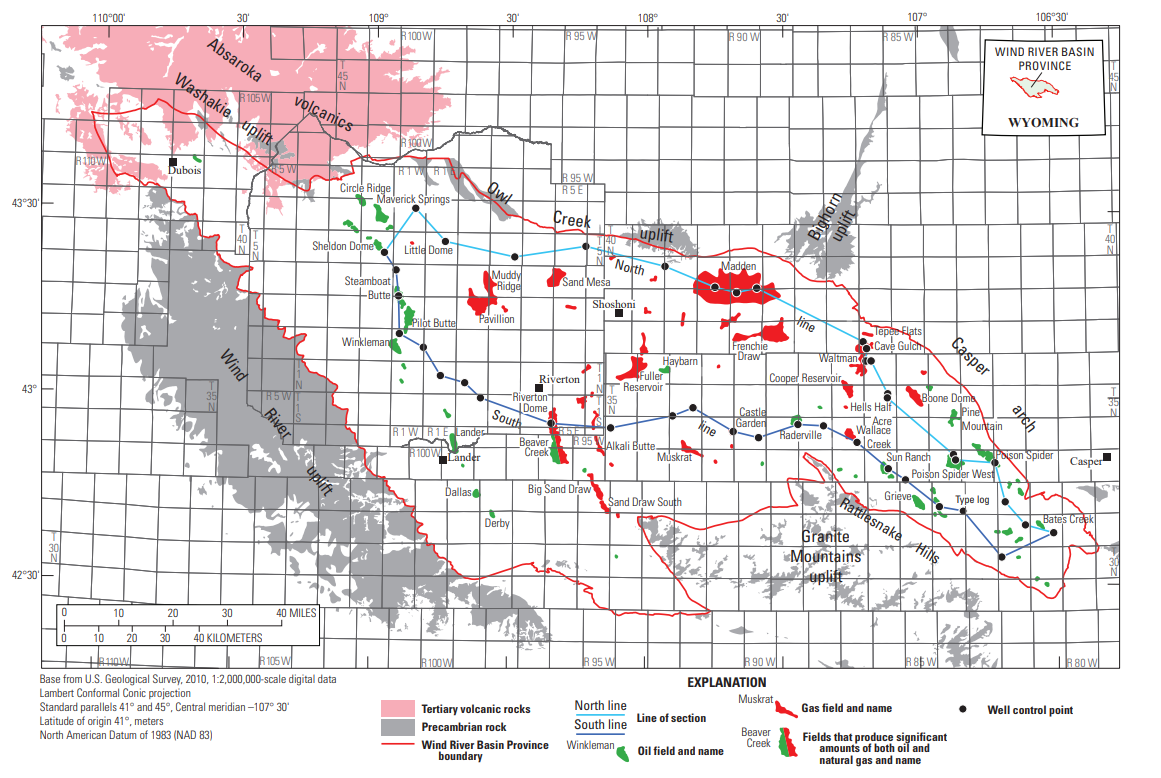
Wind River Basin Structural Map

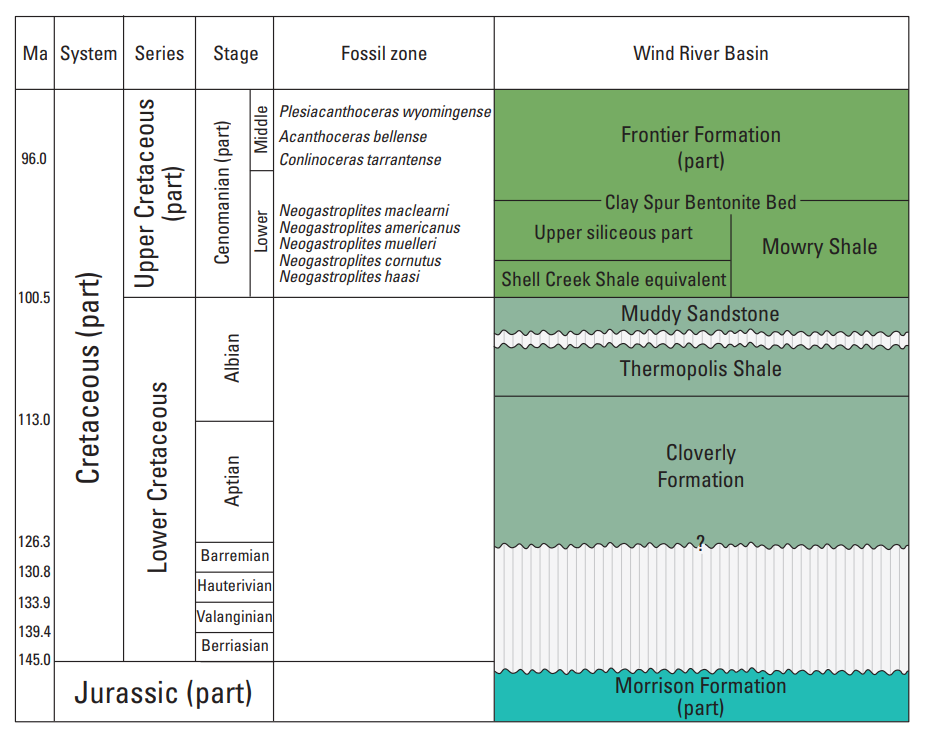
Wind River Basin Stratigraphy

The Wind River Basin is a semi-arid intermontane foreland basin in central Wyoming, United States. It is bounded by Laramide uplifts on all sides. On the west is the Wind River Range and on the North are the Absaroka Range and the Owl Creek Mountains. The Casper Arch separates the Wind River from the Powder River Basin to the east and the Sweetwater Uplift (Granite Range) lies to the south. The basin contains a sequence of 10,000–12,000 feet (3,000–3,700 meters) of predominantly marine sediments deposited during the Paleozoic and Mesozoic Eras. During the Laramide over 18,000 feet (5,500 meters) of Eocene lacustrine and fluvial sediments were deposited within the basin. Following the Eocene an additional 3,000 feet (910 meters) of sediments were deposited before, and as the basin was uplifted in the late Tertiary.

The geological formations within the basin are significant producers of petroleum and natural gas. The basin contains over 60 oil and gas fields mostly as structural traps within seventeen different formations. The primary reservoirs include the Pennsylvanian Tensleep Sandstone, the Permian Phosphoria Formation and the Cretaceous Muddy Creek and Frontier sandstones.

== Pollution from Fracking ==
In 2015 a peer-reviewed study came out revealing water wells in Pavilion are contaminated with fracking wastes. This contamination, linked to chemicals used in hydraulic fracturing, extends to the entire Wind River Basin's groundwater. The study is a challenge to the EPA's previous position by suggesting that fracking, a widespread method for oil and gas extraction in the U.S., might be causing widespread contamination. Contrary to industry assurances about the safety of water wells in the area, the study's conclusions are drawn from an exhaustive analysis of data, including the levels of methanol and diesel compounds. These indicators point to possible contamination from fracking fluid and chemical storage in unlined pits. Furthermore, the research highlights a concerning upward flow of groundwater in the basin, a factor that raises alarms about the possibility of long-term contamination migrating closer to the surface. This new evidence contradicts earlier conclusions from the EPA and state regulators, who had previously downplayed the impact of fracking on water resources.

== History ==
The first oil strike within the basin was from the Dallas dome in the western part of the basin. This discovery in 1884 was the first commercial production in Wyoming.

== Population ==
The Wind River Basin is home to the cities of Riverton and Lander as well as the towns of Shoshoni, Pavillion, and Hudson, the Census Designated Place of Crowheart, and the unincorporated communities of Kinnear, Morton, and Midvale Much of the Wind River Basin is within the boundaries of the Wind River Indian Reservation. The basin is drained primarily by the Wind River and its tributaries.

== See also ==
- Bighorn Basin
- Wyoming Basin shrub steppe
