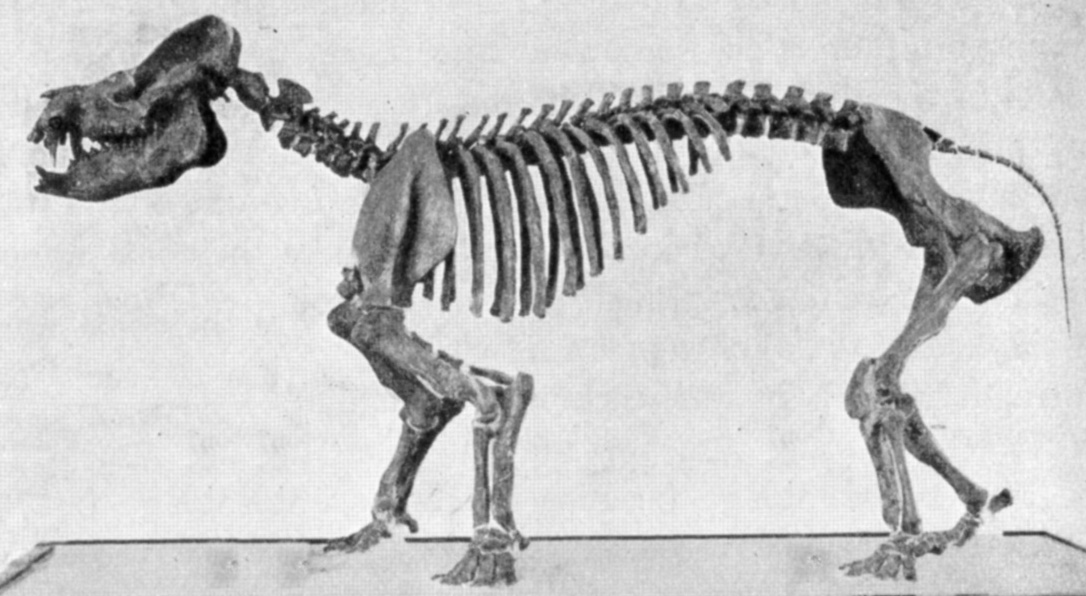
- Skeleton of Coryphodon

Scientific classification
- Kingdom: Animalia
- Phylum: Chordata
- Class: Mammalia
- Order: †Pantodonta
- Family: †Coryphodontidae
- Genus: †Coryphodon; Owen, 1845

Type species
- †Coryphodon eocaenus Owen 1845

Synonyms
- Bathmodon; Ectacodon; Letalophodon?; Loxolophodon?; Manteodon; Metalophodon

= Coryphodon =

Coryphodon Temporal range: Late Paleocene - Middle Eocene, 57–46 Ma

Pantodont mammal genus from the Paleocene epoch

Coryphodon (from Greek κορῦφὴ, "point", and ὀδοὺς, "tooth", meaning peaked tooth, referring to "the development of the angles of the ridges into points [on the molars].") is an extinct genus of pantodonts of the family Coryphodontidae.

Coryphodon was a pantodont, a member of the world's first group of large browsing mammals. It migrated across what is now northern North America (being among the largest of fauna in Wasatch Formation), replacing Barylambda, an earlier pantodont. It is regarded as the ancestor of the genus Hypercoryphodon of Late Eocene Mongolia.

Coryphodon is known from many specimens in North America and considerably fewer in Europe, Mongolia, and China. It is a small to medium-sized coryphodontid which differs from other members of the family in dental characteristics.

== Description ==
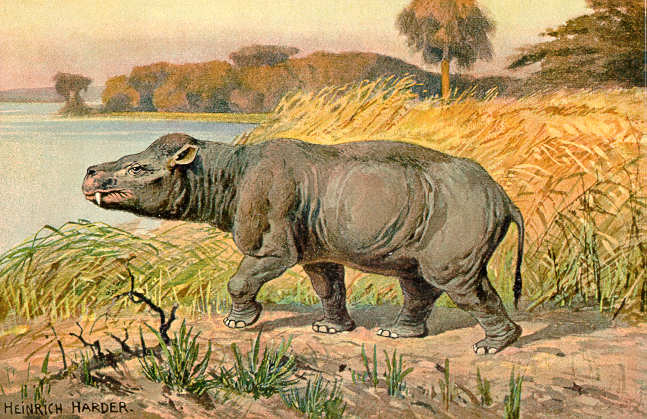
Restoration by Heinrich Harder

At about 1 metre (3.3 ft) at shoulder height and 2.5 metres (8.2 ft) in body length, Coryphodon is one of the largest-known mammals of its time. The creature was very slow, with long upper limbs and short lower limbs, which were needed to support its weight. Coryphodon does not seem to have been in need of much in the way of defences, however, since most known predators of the time seem to have been much smaller than Coryphodon.

Coryphodon had one of the smallest brain/body ratios of any mammal, living or extinct, possessing a brain weighing just 90 grams (3.2 oz) and a body weight of around 500 kilograms (1,100 lb).

The dentition of Coryphodon is similar to those of basal ungulates, the dental formula being 3,1,4,33,1,4,3 × 2 = 44. Coryphodon bore tusks derived from the canines, not dissimilar to those of dinocerates. It is because of this that Coryphodon was originally grouped with the Dinocerata in the obsolete order Amblypoda. The skull lacks a sagittal crest, having a broad, flat roof. The incisors of Coryphodon were rather small. Tooth enamel in Coryphodon contains oblique lines of nested chevrons; this arrangement is believed to have been an adaptation for protecting the enamel against breakage.

Features of the postcranial skeleton of Coryphodon suggest a semi-aquatic lifestyle. Notably, the trunk vertebrae had reduced neural spines, which in mammals are commonly linked to more water-adapted modes of movement. The limbs of Coryphodon were rather stout, and the feet were short, bearing 5 toes that had small hoof bones. In terms of anatomy, the feet of Coryphodon were similar to those of Uintatherium, though this is purely due to convergence.

Estimates of Coryphodon's body mass have varied considerably. Based on a regression analysis of ungulates, Uhen & Gingerich 1995 estimated the mean body mass for the type species C. eocaenus to 340 kg (750 lb), 600 kg (1,300 lb) for C. radians, and possibly as much as 700 kg (1,500 lb) for C. proterus and C. lobatus.

== Taxonomy and systematics ==
Since the first fossil was found in Wyoming, the taxonomy of Coryphodon and its family have been in disarray – five described genera have been synonymized with Coryphodon and thirty-five proposed species have been declared invalid.

=== Species ===
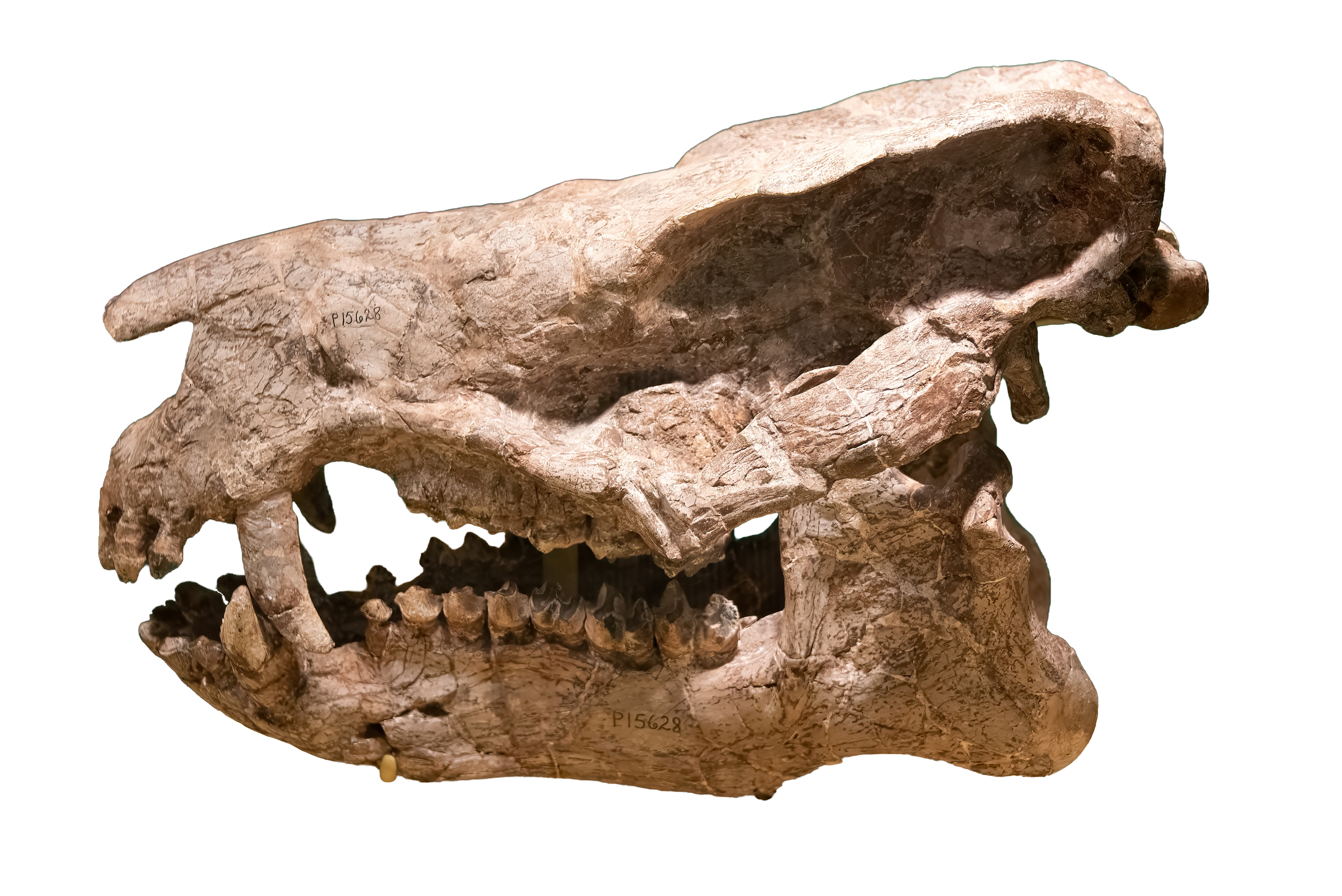
C. lobatus skull

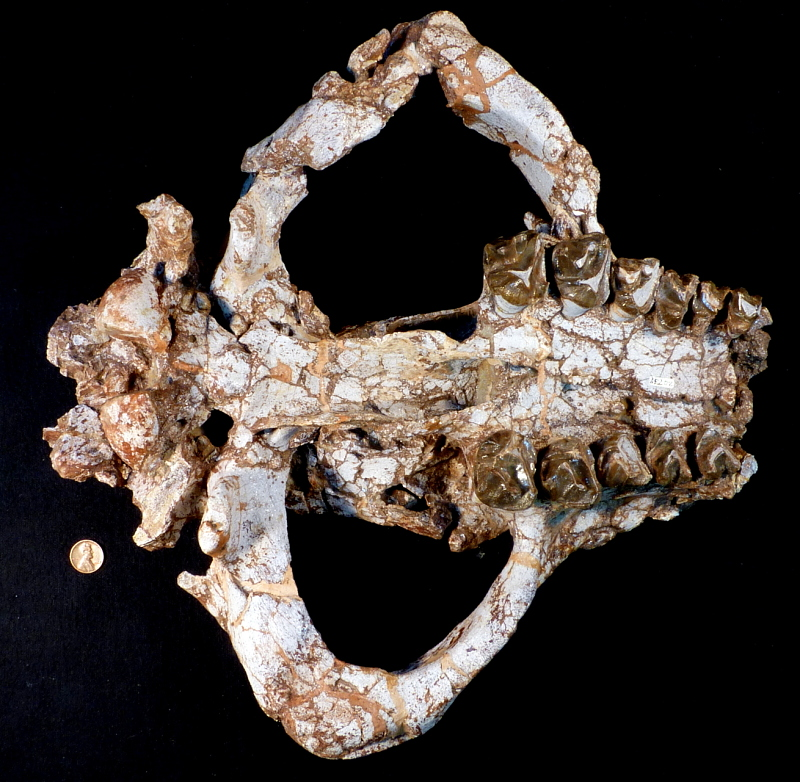
Coryphodon skull

- C. anax was named by Cope (1882); it was synonymized with Coryphodon lobatus by Osborn (1898) and Uhen and Gingerich (1995).
- C. anthracoideus was named by de Blainville (1846).
- C. armatus was named by Cope (1872).
- C. dabuensis was named by Zhai (1978).
- C. eocaenus was named by Owen (1846); it was reassigned to Lophiodon eocaenum by Blainville (1846); it was revalidated by Cope (1877), Lucas (1984) and Uhen and Gingerich (1995).
- C. gosseleti (=C. grosseleti lapsus calami) was named by Malaquin (1899).
- C. hamatus was named by Marsh (1876); it was synonymized with Coryphodon anthracoideus by Lucas (1984) and Lucas and Schoch (1990); it was synonymized with Coryphodon radians by Uhen and Gingerich (1995).
- C. lobatus was named by Cope (1877).
- C. marginatus was named by Cope (1882); it was synonymized with Coryphodon eocaenus by Lucas (1984) and Uhen and Gingerich (1995).
- C. oweni was named by Hebert (1856).
- C. pisuqti was named by Dawson (2012)
- C. proterus was named by Simons (1960).
- C. repandus was named by Cope (1882); it was synonymized with Coryphodon radians by Uhen and Gingerich (1995).
- C. radians was named by Cope (1872).
- C. singularis? was named by Osborn (1898); it is a nomen dubium due its to pathology.
- C. subquadratus? was named by Cope (1882); it was synonymized with Manteodon.
- C. tsaganensis was named by Reshetov (1976)
- C. ventanus was named by Osborn (1898); it was synonymized with Coryphodon lobatus by Uhen and Gingerich (1995).

=== Synonyms ===
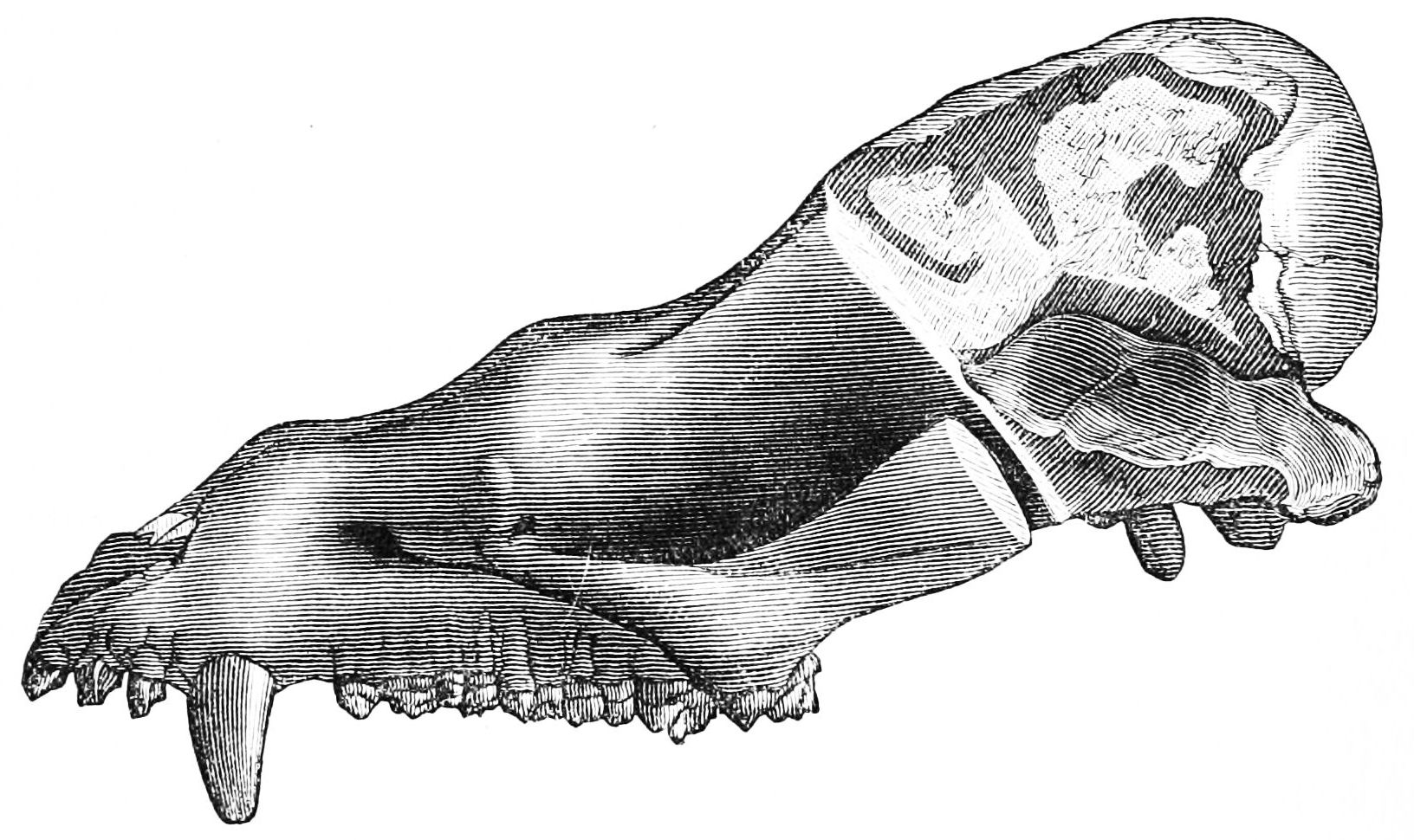
Skull of C. elephantopus

- Bathmodon radians was named by Cope (1872); it was synonymized with Coryphodon anthracoideus by Lucas (1998b); it was reassigned to Coryphodon radians by Cope (1877), Simpson (1948a), Simpson (1951), Simpson (1981) and Uhen and Gingerich (1995).
- Bathmodon semicinctus was named by Cope (1872); it was reassigned to Loxolophodon semicinctus by Cope (1872); it was revalidated by Cope (1873); it was reassigned to Coryphodon semicinctus by Wheeler (1961); it was synonymized with Coryphodon radians by Gazin (1962); it was considered a nomen dubium by Uhen and Gingerich (1995).
- Ectacodon cinctus was named by Cope (1882); it was reassigned to Coryphodon cinctus by Osborn (1898); it was synonymized with Coryphodon radians by Uhen and Gingerich (1995).
- Letalophodon?
- Loxolophodon? was named by Cope, (1872)
- Manteodon subquadratus was named by Cope (1882); it was reassigned to Coryphodon subquadratus by Lucas (1984); it was synonymized with Coryphodon radians by Uhen and Gingerich (1995).
- Metalophodon testis was named by Cope (1882); it was reassigned to Coryphodon testis by Osborn (1898); it was synonymized with Coryphodon radians by Uhen and Gingerich (1995).

=== Size evolution ===
Coryphodon evolved from the Late Paleocene C. proterus, one of the largest species found and the only one known from the Clarkforkian NALMA. The body size then decreased until C. eocaenus appears at the Clarkforkian-Wasatchian transition (55.4 Ma, near the PETM), from where Coryphodon evolved into the large species C. radians. C. radians in its turn evolved into two contemporaneous species that appear in the Early Eocene, the small C. armatus and the very large C. lobatus. These changes in size are thought to be linked to global climate change, with the size minimum in the Coryphodon lineage occurring shortly after Paleocene-Eocene boundary.

== Paleobiology ==
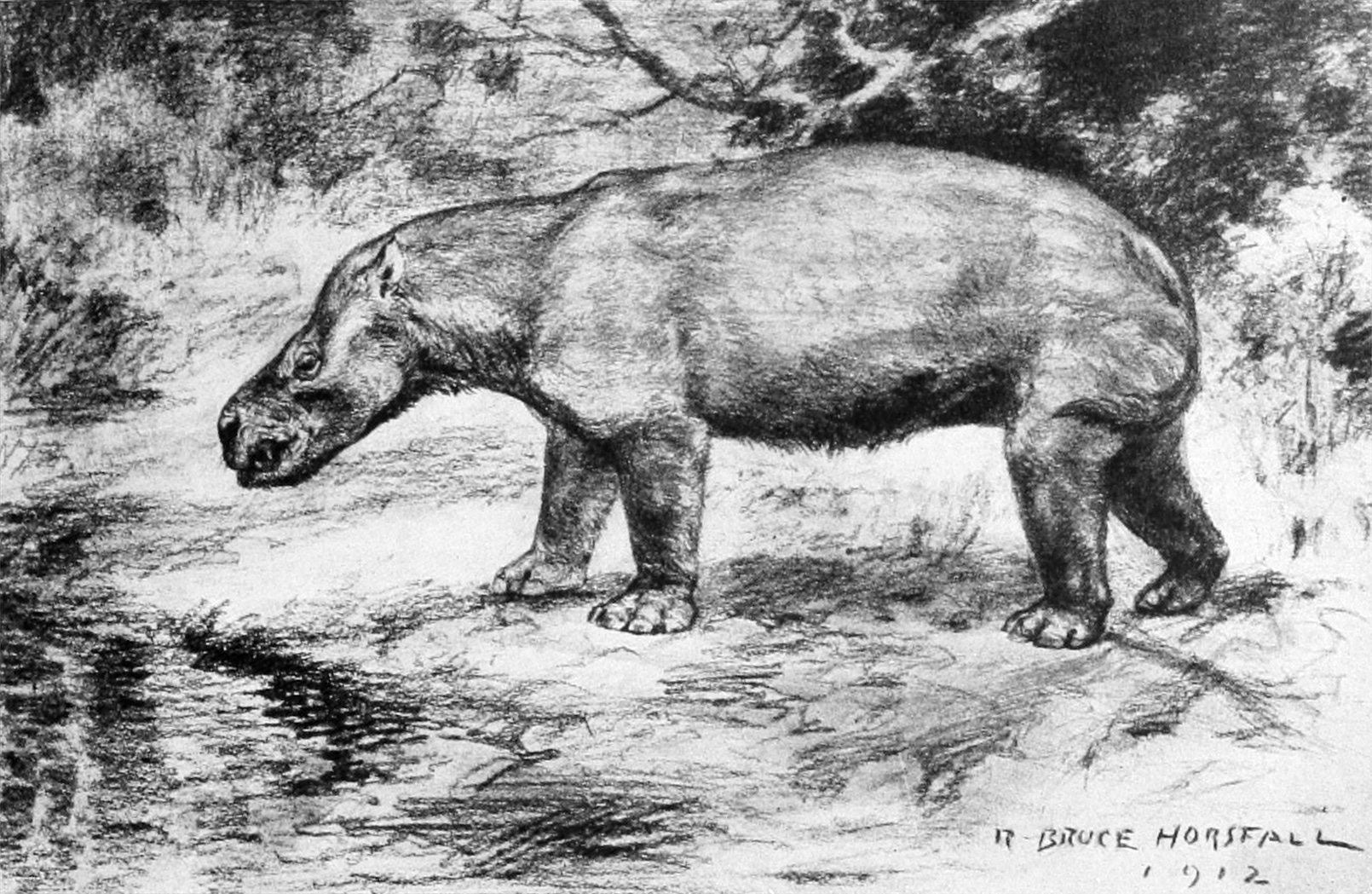
Individual walking towards a swamp, Robert Bruce Horsfall

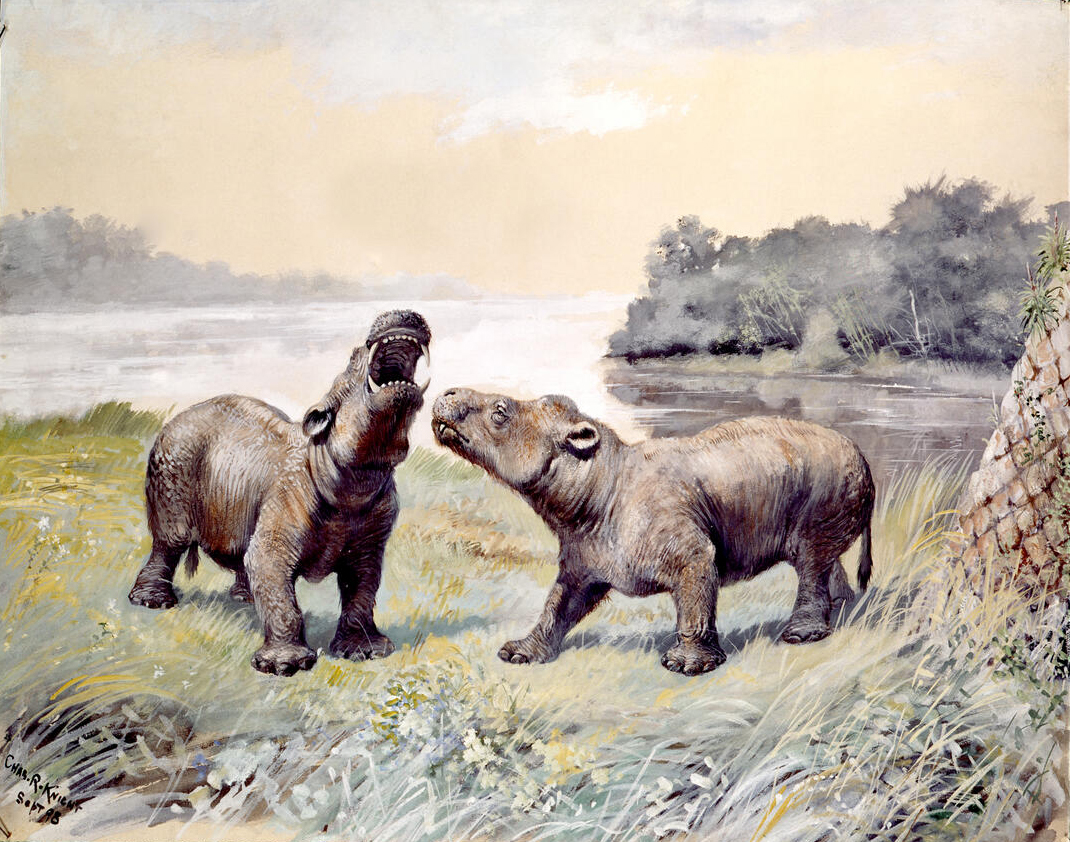
Restoration by Charles R. Knight

=== Feeding and diet ===
Coryphodon had a semi-aquatic lifestyle, likely living in swamps and marshes like a hippopotamus, although it was not closely related to modern hippos or any other animal known today. Coryphodon had very strong neck muscles and short tusks that were probably used to uproot swamp plants. The other teeth in the mouth were suited for processing plants that had been grabbed by browsing.

Fossils found on Ellesmere Island, near Greenland, show that Coryphodon once lived there in warm swamp forests of huge trees, similar to the modern cypress swamps of the American South. Though the climate of the Eocene was much warmer than today, plants and animals living north of the Arctic Circle still experienced months of complete darkness and 24-hour summer days. Isotopic studies of tooth enamel revealed that during the summer period of extended daylight Coryphodon would eat soft vegetation such as flowering plants, aquatic plants and leaves. However during the extended periods of darkness when plant photosynthesis was impossible, Coryphodon would switch to a diet of leaf litter, twigs, evergreen needles and most revealingly fungi, an organism and food source that does not require light to grow. Not only does this study reveal the dietary range of Coryphodon, but it also reveals the behaviour of the northern populations living within the Arctic Circle. In this respect, Coryphodon did not migrate south or hibernate, it simply switched between two seasonal food sources.

=== Sexual dimorphism ===
Uhen & Gingerich 1995 noticed a sexual dimorphism in Coryphodon: the canines tend to be either very large or very small compared to cheek teeth, and, comparing to modern hippos, there is reason to assume males had larger canines than females.

== Sources ==
- Owen, Richard (1845). Odontography; a treatise on the comparative anatomy of the teeth. London: Hippolyte Bailliere. OCLC 727240564.
- Uhen, Mark D.; Gingerich, Philip D. (1995). "Evolution of Coryphodon (Mammalia, Pantodonta) in the Late Paleocene and Early Eocene of Northwestern Wyoming" (PDF). Contributions from the Museum of Paleontology, University of Michigan. 29 (10): 259–89. OCLC 742731820.
- Palmer, D. (1999). The Marshall Illustrated Encyclopedia of Dinosaurs and Prehistoric Animals. London: Marshall Editions. ISBN 1-84028-152-9.
- Eberle, Jaelyn J.; Fricke, Henry C.; Humphrey, John D.; Hackett, Logan; Newbrey, Michael G.; Hutchison, J. Howard (June 2009). "Seasonal variability in Arctic temperatures during early Eocene time". Earth and Planetary Science Letters. 296 (3–4): 481–486. Bibcode:2010E&PSL.296..481E. doi:10.1016/j.epsl.2010.06.005.
- "Taxonomic history of the genus †Coryphodon Owen, 1845". After McKenna & Bell, 1997, and Alroy, 2002.
- Eberle, Jaelyn J.; Fricke, Henry C.; Humphrey, John D. (2009). "Lower latitude mammals as year-round residents in Eocene Arctic forests". Geology. 37 (6): 499–502. Bibcode:2009Geo....37..499E. doi:10.1130/g25633a.1.
