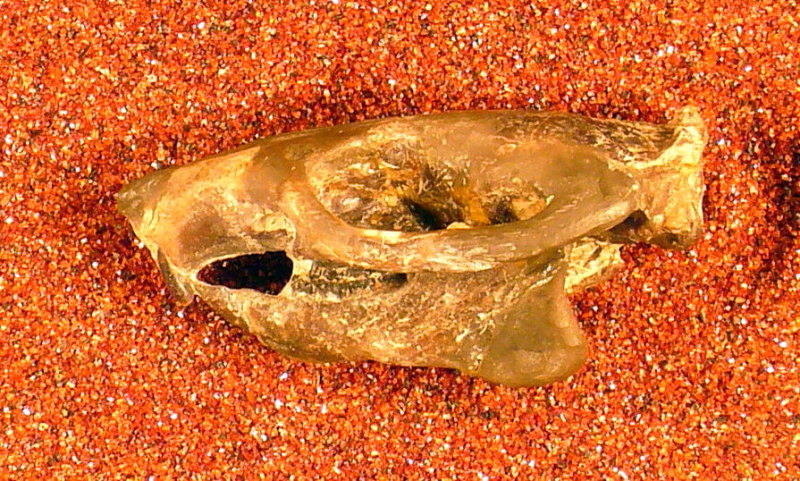
- Skull

Scientific classification
- Kingdom: Animalia
- Phylum: Chordata
- Class: Mammalia
- Order: Rodentia
- Suborder: Sciuromorpha
- Infraorder: Protrogomorpha
- Family: †Ischyromyidae
- Genus: †Paramys; Leidy, 1871

Species
- P. adamus; P. atavus; P. compressidens; P. copei; P. delicatior; P. delicatus; P. excavatus; P. hunti; P. nini; P. pycnus; P. simpsoni; P. taurus

= Paramys =

Paramys Temporal range: Late Paleocene - Middle Eocene

Extinct genus of rodents

Paramys is an extinct genus of rodents from North America, Europe, and Asia. It is one of the oldest genera of rodents known and probably lived in trees. While the genus name literally means "near a mouse", it coexisted with Thisbemys, a similar rodent, thus yielding a reference to Pyramus and Thisbe.

== Description ==
The brain of both the Early Eocene P. copei and the Middle Eocene P. delicatus was characterised by a lower neocortical surface area, smaller paraflocculi, and larger olfactory bulbs relative to total endocranial volume of later rodents, and they both possessed encephalisation quotients higher than that of Ischyromys typus. The enamel in Paramys incisors was about 50 µm thick. Paramys incisor enamel had pauciserial Hunter-Schreger bands (HSBs) with about 2-3 enamel prisms per band. The interprismatic matrix ran parallel to enamel prisms.

== Palaeobiology ==
=== Locomotion ===
P. delicatus possessed more robust limbs and could apply a greater mechanical advantage using its limbs relative to most living squirrels, including living semi-fossorial squirrels. This suggests that it was a semi-fossorial animal that was adapted for scratch-digging.
