= Wasatch Formation =

Geologic formation in the western United States

- Stratigraphic range: Early Eocene (Clarkforkian-Bridgerian) (typically Wasatchian); ~56.8–46.2 Ma
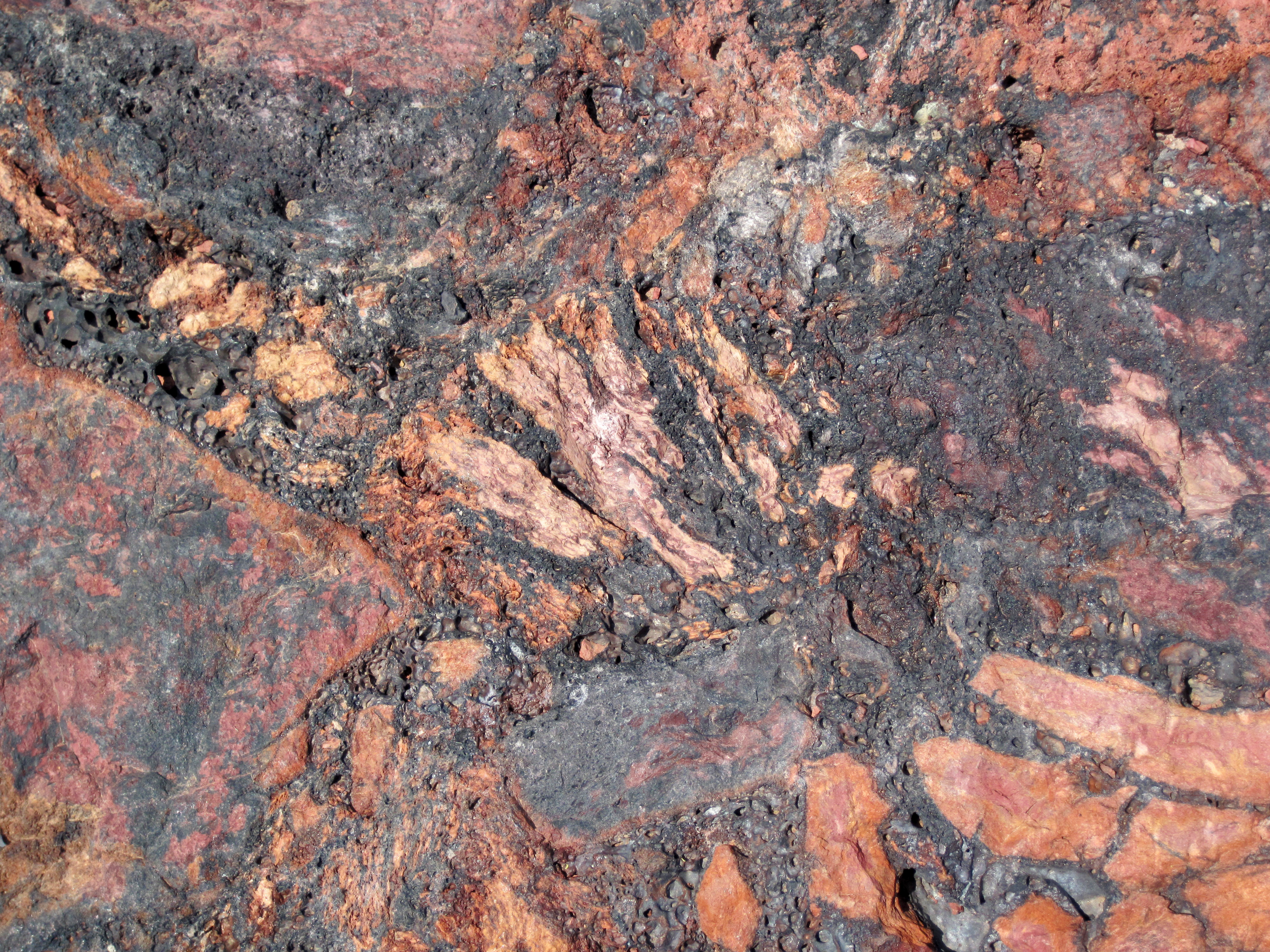
- Clinker-bed breccia from the Wasatch Formation (Wyoming)
- Type: Formation
- Sub-units: See text
- Underlies: Green River & Fowkes Formations, Santa Fe Group
- Overlies: Fort Union, Williams Fork, Torrejon & Evanston Formations
- Thickness: Variable, up to 1,500 m (4,900 ft)

Lithology
- Primary: Mudstone, shale, siltstone, sandstone
- Other: Claystone, lignite

Location
- Coordinates: 41.2°N 108.8°W
- Approximate paleocoordinates: 46.0°N 92.6°W
- Region: Colorado, Idaho, Montana, Wyoming, Utah
- Country: United States
- Extent: Powder River, Green River, Wind River, Bighorn, Piceance & Uinta Basins

Type section
- Named for: Wasatch Range
- Named by: Hayden
- Location: Echo Canyon, Summit County & Weber Canyon, Ogden, Utah
- Year defined: 1873
- Coordinates: 40.88°N 110.97°W (Echo Canyon); 41°08′09″N 111°54′14″W (Weber Canyon)
- Region: Utah
- Wasatch Formation (the United States) Wasatch Formation (Wyoming)

The Wasatch Formation (Tw) is an extensive highly fossiliferous geologic formation stretching across several basins in Idaho, Montana, Wyoming, Utah and western Colorado. It preserves fossils dating back to the Early Eocene period. The formation defines the Wasatchian or Lostcabinian (55.8 to 50.3 Ma), a period of time used within the NALMA classification, but the formation ranges in age from the Clarkforkian (56.8 to 55.8 Ma) to Bridgerian (50.3 to 46.2 Ma).

Wasatch fauna consists of many groups of mammals, including numerous genera of primates, artiodactyls, perissodactyls, rodents, carnivora, insectivora, hyaenodonta and others. A number of birds, several reptiles and fish and invertebrates complete the diverse faunal assemblages. Fossil flora and ichnofossils also have been recovered from the formation.

The formation, first named as Wasatch Group in 1873 by Ferdinand Vandeveer Hayden, was deposited in alluvial, fluvial and lacustrine environments and comprises sandstones, siltstones, mudstones and shales with coal or lignite beds representing wet floodplain settings.

The Wasatch Formation is an unconventional tight gas reservoir formation in the Uinta and Piceance Basins of Utah and the coal seams of the formation are mined in Wyoming. At the Fossil Butte National Monument, the formation crops out underlying the Green River Formation. In the Silt Quadrangle of Garfield County, Colorado, the formation overlies the Williams Fork Formation.

== Description ==
=== Definition ===
The Wasatch Formation was first named as the Wasatch Group by Ferdinand Vandeveer Hayden in the 1873 edition of his original 1869 publication titled "Preliminary field report of the United States Geological Survey of Colorado and New Mexico: U.S. Geological and Geographical Survey of the Territories", based on sections in the Echo and Weber Canyons, of the Wasatch Mountains. In the language of the native Ute people, Wasatch means "mountain pass" or "low pass over high range." According to William Bright, the mountains were named for a Shoshoni leader who was named with the Shoshoni term wasattsi, meaning "blue heron".

=== Outcrops ===
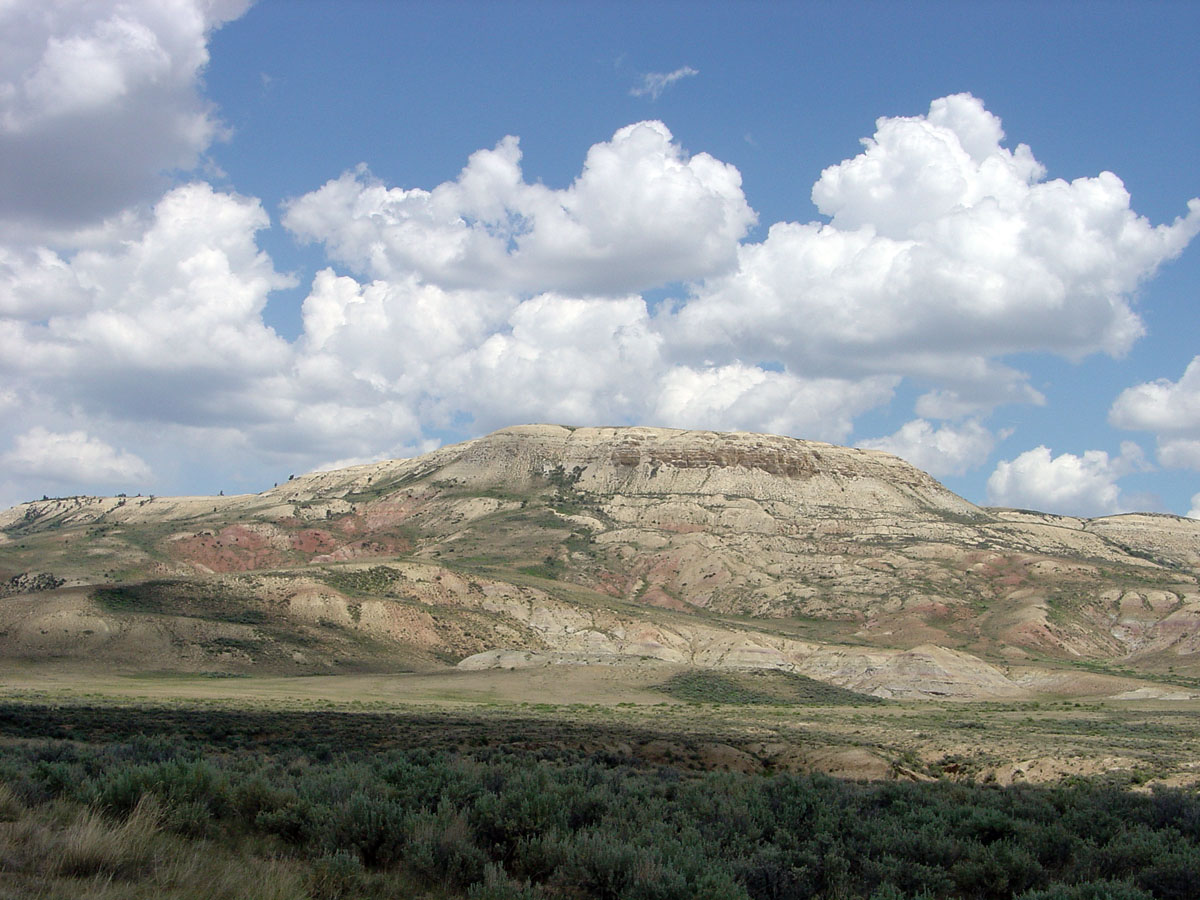
View of Fossil Butte with the Wasatch Formation outcropping in the lower areas

At the base of Fossil Butte are the bright red, purple, yellow and gray beds of the Wasatch Formation. Eroded portions of these horizontal beds slope gradually upward from the valley floor and steepen abruptly. Overlying them and extending to the top of the butte are the much steeper buff-to-white beds of the Green River Formation, which are about 300 feet (91 m) thick. The Wasatch Formation ranges from about 3,000 feet (910 m) in the western part of the Uinta Basin, thinning to 2,000 feet (610 m) in the east. In the Silt Quadrangle of Garfield County, Colorado, the formation overlies the Williams Fork Formation. The formation is exposed in the Desolation and Gray Canyons pertaining to the Colorado Plateau in northeastern Utah, and in Flaming Gorge National Recreation Area at the border of southwestern Wyoming and northeastern Utah.

=== Extent ===
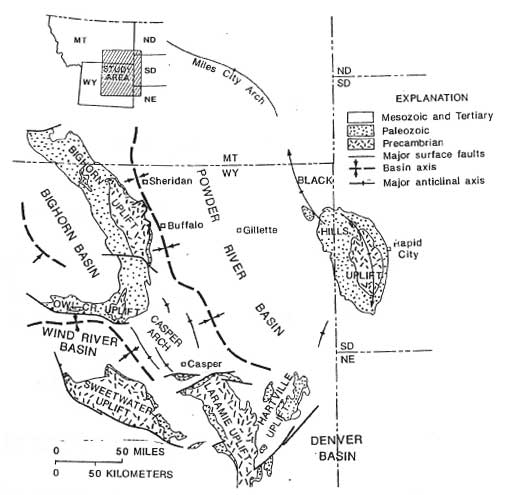
Map of the Powder and Wind River and Bighorn Basins

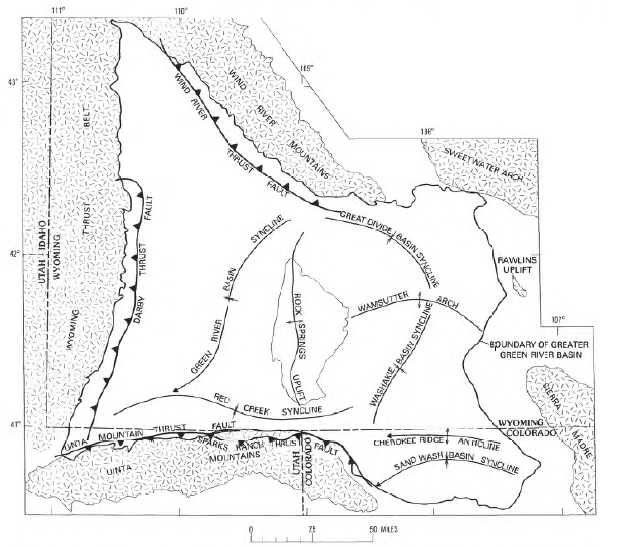
Map of the Green River Basin

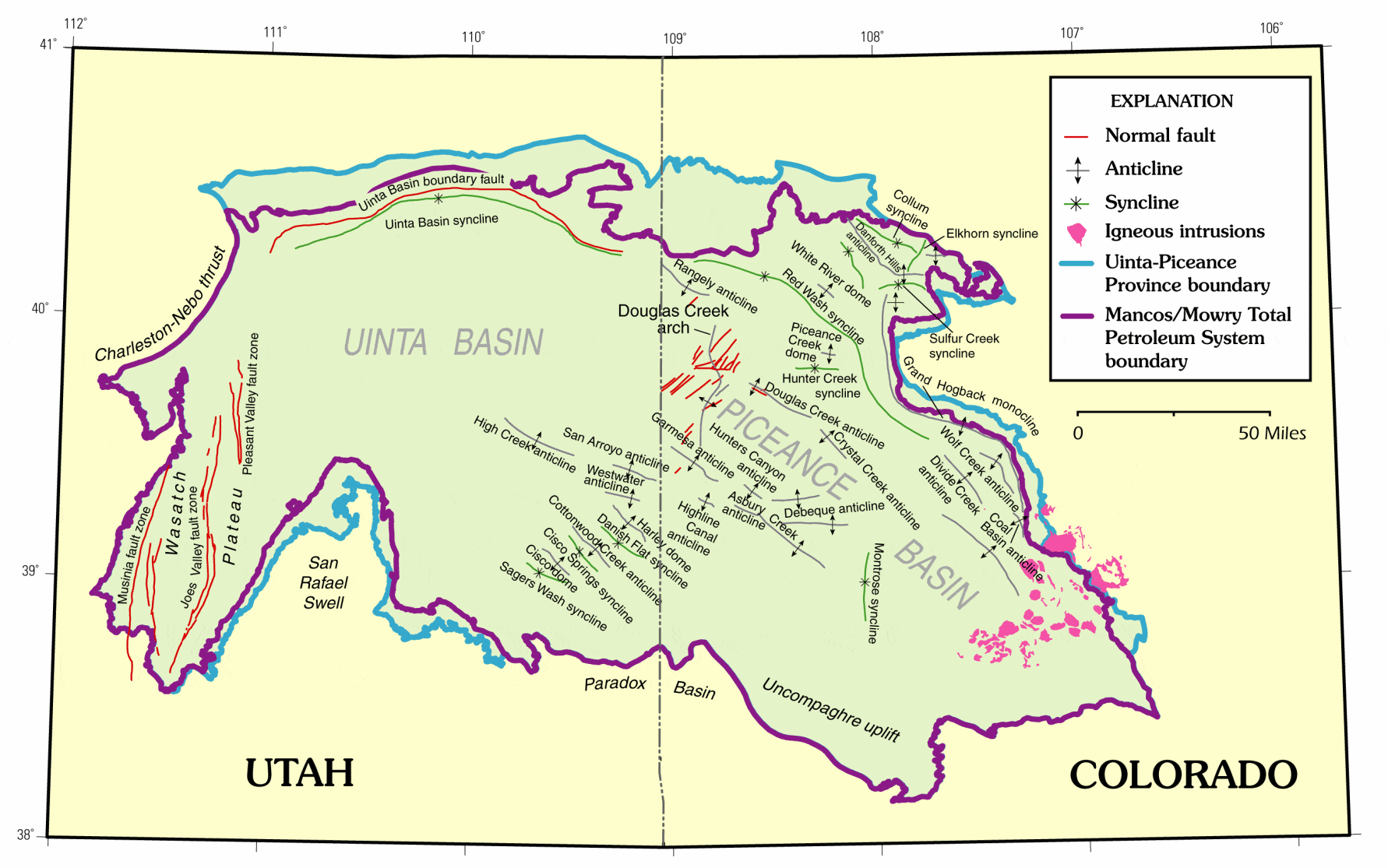
Map of the Uinta and Piceance Basins

The Wasatch Formation is found across six states in the northwestern United States, from Montana and Idaho in the north across Utah and Wyoming to Colorado in the southwest. The formation is part of several geologic provinces; the eponymous Wasatch uplift, Uinta uplift, Green River, Piceance, Powder River, Uinta and Paradox Basins and the Colorado Plateau sedimentary province and Yellowstone province.

In Montana, the formation overlies the Fort Union Formation and is overlain by the White River Formation. There is a regional, angular unconformity between the Fort Union and Wasatch Formations in the northern portion of the Powder River Basin.

=== Subdivision ===
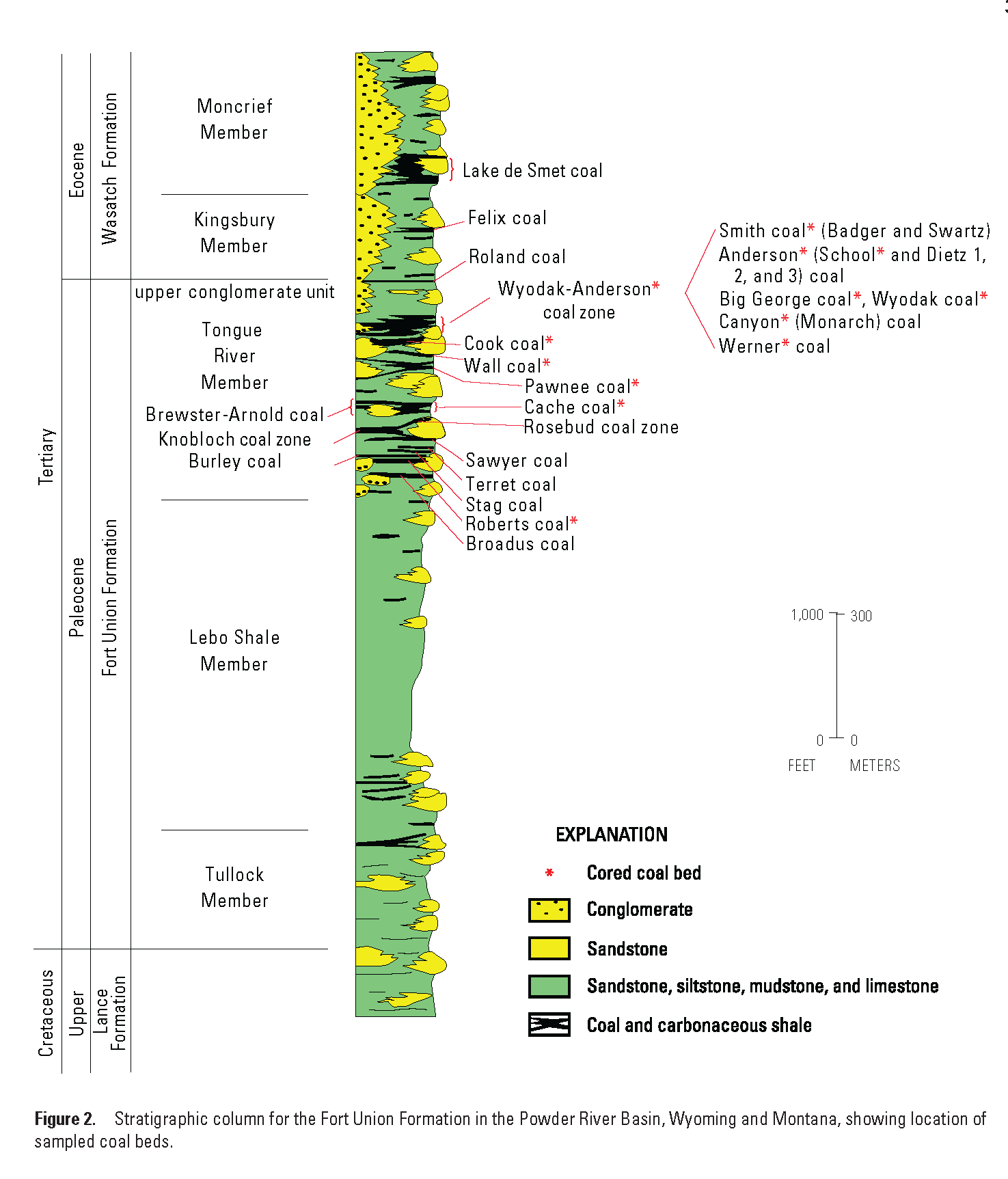
Generalized stratigraphy of the Wasatch Formation

Many local subdivisions of the formation exist, the following members have been named in the literature:

Member	States	Lithologies	Notes
Alkali Creek Tongue	Wyoming	Mudstones and sandstones	
Atwell Gulch	Colorado	Sandstones and mudstones	
Bullpen	Wyoming		
Cathedral Bluffs Tongue	Colorado, Wyoming	Mudstones and sandstones	
Chappo	Wyoming		
Cowley Canyon	Utah		
Desertion Point Tongue	Wyoming		
Hiawatha	Colorado, Utah, Wyoming		
Kingsbury Conglomerate	Wyoming	Feldspathic conglomerates	
Knight	Utah, Wyoming		
La Barge	Wyoming		
Lookout Mountain Conglomerate	Wyoming	Conglomerates	
Luman Tongue	Wyoming		
Main Body	Wyoming	Mudstones	
Molina	Colorado	Sandstones	
Moncrief	Wyoming	Feldspathic conglomerates	
New Fork Tongue	Wyoming		
Nightingale	Wyoming		
Niland Tongue	Colorado, Wyoming		
Ramsey Ranch	Wyoming		
Red Desert Tongue	Wyoming		
Renegade Tongue	Colorado, Utah		
Shire	Colorado	Sandstones and mudstones	
Tunp	Wyoming		

=== Lithologies and facies ===
In the Fossil Basin at the Fossil Butte National Monument, Wyoming, the Wasatch Formation consists primarily of brightly variegated mudstones with subordinate interbedded siltstones, sandstones, and conglomerates and represents deposition on an intermontane alluvial plain. In Mesa County, Colorado, the formation comprises interbedded purple, lavender, red, and gray claystones and shales with local lenses of gray and brown sandstones, conglomeratic sandstones, and volcanic sandstones that are predominantly fluvial and lacustrine in origin. Along the western margin of the Powder River Basin, the Wasatch Formation contains two thick conglomeratic members (in descending order, the Moncrief Member and Kingsbury Conglomerate Member).

The Molina Member of the formation is a zone of distinctly sandier fluvial strata. The over- and underlying members of the Molina are the Atwell Gulch and Shire members, respectively. These members consist of infrequent lenses of fluvial-channel sandstones interbedded within thick units of variegated red, orange, purple and gray overbank and paleosol mudstones.

The Molina Member represents a sudden change in the tectonic and/or climatic regimes, that caused an influx of laterally-continuous, fine, coarse and locally conglomeratic sands into the basin. The type section of the Molina is located near the small town of Molina on the western edge of the basin and is about 90 metres (300 ft) thick. These sandy strata of the Molina Member form continuous, erosion-resistant benches that extend to the north of the type section for approximately 25 kilometres (16 mi). The benches are cut by canyons or "gulches", from which the Atwell Gulch and Shire Gulch members get their names. The Molina forms the principle target within the Wasatch Formation for natural gas exploration, although it is usually called the "G sandstone" in the subsurface.

==== Provenance ====
Detrital zircons collected from the middle part of the formation in the Powder River Basin of Wyoming, where the Wasatch Formation reaches a thickness of more than 1,500 metres (4,900 ft) were gathered for U-Pb geochronological analysis. The detrital zircon age spectrum ranged from 1433 to 2957 Ma in age, and consisted of more than 95% Archean age grains, with an age peak of about 2900 Ma. The 2900 Ma age peak is consistent with the age of Archean rocks at the core of the Bighorn Mountains. The sparse Proterozoic grains were likely derived from the recycling of Paleozoic sandstone units. The analysis concluded that the Wasatch sandstone is a first cycle sediment, the Archean core of the Bighorn uplift was exposed and shedding sediment into the Powder River Basin during time of deposition of the Wasatch Formation and the Powder River Basin Wasatch detrital zircon age spectra are distinct from the coeval Willwood Formation in the Bighorn Basin west of the Bighorn Mountains. Cobbles and pebbles in the Wasatch are rich in feldspathic rock fragments, with individual samples containing as much as 40 percent, derived from erosion of the Precambrian core of the Bighorn Mountains. Part of the feldspar has been replaced by calcite cement. Glauconite is present in the Wasatch, although always in volumes of less than 1 percent of the grains. It most probably was derived from the nearby, friable, glauconite-bearing Mesozoic strata of the eastern Bighorn Mountains.

The presence of the Kingsbury Conglomerate at the base of the Wasatch Formation indicates that tectonic activity in the immediate vicinity of the Powder River Basin was intensifying. The conglomerate consists of Mesozoic and Paleozoic rock fragments. The lack of Precambrian fragments indicates that the metamorphic core of the Bighorn Mountains had not been dissected by this early deformation. Deformation in the upper part of the formation has been interpreted as the result of the last phase of uplift during the Laramide orogeny.

=== Correlations ===
The basal part of the Wasatch Formation is equivalent to the Flagstaff Formation in the southwest part of the Uinta Basin. The Wasatch Formation is correlated with the Sentinel Butte and Golden Valley Formations of the Williston Basin.

== Paleontological significance ==
The Wasatch Formation is the defining formation for the Wasatchian, ranging from 55.8 to 50.3 Ma, within the NALMA classification. The Wasatchian followed the Clarkforkian stage (56.8-55.8 Ma) and is defined by the simultaneous first appearance of adapid and omomyid euprimates, hyaenodontid creodonts, perissodactyls and artiodactyls. The deposits of the formation were laid down during a period of globally high temperatures during the Paleocene-Eocene Thermal Maximum (PETM). Mean annual temperatures were around 25 °C (77 °F) and temperature variations were minimal during this time.

At the Fossil Butte National Monument, the Wasatch Formation preserved ichnofossils attributed to arthropods and described as Lunulichnus tuberosus. Trace fossils are common within the upper part of the Main Body Member. These traces occur in three distinct alluvial depositional settings: flood basin/alluvial plain, crevasse splay, and fluvial channel. Flood basin deposits (dominated by alluvial paleosols with pronounced color variegation) are characterized by common Planolites, rare Skolithos and small, meniscate plug-shaped burrows, possibly Celliforma.

Crevasse splay deposits (current-rippled to planar laminated, fine-grained sandstone to siltstone) are characterized by a mixed assemblage of vertical (Arenicolites, Skolithos, unwalled sinuous shafts, shafts with discoidal lenses of sediment), sub-vertical (Camborygma and Thalassinoides) and horizontal (Scoyenia, Rusophycus, Taenidium, Planolites and Palaeophycus) burrows. Large, vertically oriented burrows (Camborygma, cf. Ophiomorpha, Spongeliomorpha and Thalassinoides) are the dominant forms within fluvial channel deposits.

=== Fossil content ===
Among the following fossils have been found in the formation:

==== Mammals ====
Primates

- Absarokius abbotti
- A. gazini
- Anaptomorphus aemulus
- Anemorhysis sublettensis
- Arapahovius gazini
- Artimonius nocerai
- A. witteri
- Cantius frugivorus
- C. mckennai
- C. nunienus
- Carpodaptes cf. hazelae
- Chiromyoides minor
- Chlororhysis knightensis
- Copelemur australotutus
- C. praetutus
- C. tutus
- Ignacius frugivorus
- Loveina minuta
- L. sheai
- L. zephyri
- Microsyops angustidens
- M. knightensis
- M. latidens
- M. cf. elegans
- M. cf. scottianus
- Notharctus robinsoni
- N. venticolus
- Omomys carteri
- O. lloydi
- Plesiadapis dubius
- Plesiadapis cf. cookei
- Plesiadapis cf. rex
- Simpsonlemur cf. jepseni
- Smilodectes sororis
- Steinius cf. vespertinus
- Tetonius matthewi
- Tetonoides pearcei
- cf. Trogolemur myodes
- Uintanius rutherfurdi
- Utahia carina
- Walshina mcgrewi
- Washakius insignis
- W. izetti
- cf. Choctawius sp.
- Cantius sp.
- Carpolestes sp.
- Chlororhysis sp.
- Loveina sp.
- Microsyops sp.
- Notharctus sp.
- Omomys sp.
- Phenacolemur sp.
- Picrodus sp.
- Tetonius sp.
- Trogolemur sp.
- Uintasorex sp.
- Phenacolemurinae indet.

Artiodactyls

- Antiacodon pygmaeus
- Bunophorus cf. etsagicus
- B. grangeri
- B. macropternus
- B. sinclairi
- Diacodexis secans
- Gagadon minimonstrum
- Hexacodus pelodes
- H. uintensis
- Antiacodon sp.
- Bunophorus sp.
- Diacodexis sp.
- Hexacodus sp.
- Microsus sp.
- Dichobunidae indet.

Perissodactyls

- Arenahippus pernix
- Cardiolophus semihians
- cf. Dilophodon destitutus
- Eotitanops borealis
- Heptodon calciculus
- H. posticus
- Homogalax protapirinus
- Hyrachyus modestus
- Hyracotherium vasacciense
- Lambdotherium popoagicum
- Minippus index
- Orohippus proteros
- Orohippus cf. pumilus
- Palaeosyops fontinalis
- Protorohippus venticolum
- Xenicohippus craspedotum
- Eotitanops borealis
- Helaletes sp.
- Heptodon sp.
- Homogalax sp.
- Hyrachyus sp.
- Hyracotherium sp.
- Lambdotherium sp.
- Orohippus sp.
- Palaeosyops sp.
- Equidae indet.
- Helaletidae indet.
- Isectolophidae indet.
- Perissodactyla indet.
- Tapiroidea indet.

Hyaenodonta

- Gazinocyon vulpeculus
- Iridodon datzae
- Prolimnocyon antiquus
- Prototomus secundarius
- Tritemnodon cf. strenuus
- Prolimnocyon sp.
- Sinopa sp.
- Thinocyon sp.
- Tritemnodon sp.
- Hyaenodontidae indet.

Acreodi

- Dissacus cf. praenuntius
- Hapalodectes leptognathus
- Pachyaena ossifraga
- Wyolestes dioctes
- Dissacus sp.
- ?Mesonyx sp.
- Mesonychidae indet.

Carnivora

- Miacis latidens
- Vulpavus australis
- V. canavus
- Miacis sp.
- Vulpavus sp.
- Miacidae indet.

Cimolesta

- Amaramnis gregoryi
- Esthonyx acutidens
- Esthonyx cf. bisulcatus
- Palaeoryctes cruoris
- Palaeoryctes cf. punctatus
- ?Trogosus cf. latidens
- Esthonyx sp.
- Trogosus sp.

Dinocerata

- cf. Bathyopsis fissidens
- Probathyopsis cf. harrisorum
- Bathyopsis sp.

Erinaceomorpha

- Adunator meizon

Eutheria

- Aceroryctes dulcis
- Arctocyon nexus
- Bessoecetor cf. septentrionalis
- Chriacus oconostotae
- Lambertocyon gingerichi
- Palaeosinopa incerta
- P. lacus
- Palaeosinopa cf. didelphoides
- cf. Palaeosinopa lutreola
- Thryptacodon australis
- T. pseudarctos
- Chriacus sp.
- Claenodon sp.

Ferae

- Ambloctonus major
- Brachianodon westorum
- Didymictis altidens
- D. cf. protenus
- Oxyaena forcipata
- O. lupina
- Protictis agastor
- P. paralus
- Raphictis cf. gausion
- Tubulodon pearcei
- Tytthaena parrisi
- Uintacyon asodes
- Viverravus cf. acutus
- V. gracilis
- V. lutosus
- V. minutus
- V. sicarius
- Didymictis sp.
- Patriofelis sp.
- Viverravus sp.

Glires

- Acritoparamys francesi
- Knightomys depressus
- K. huerfanensis
- Leptotomus parvus
- Lophiparamys murinus
- Microparamys hunterae
- M. minutus
- Mysops fraternus
- ?Notoparamys blochi
- Paramys copei
- P. delicatior
- P. delicatus
- P. excavatus
- P. taurus
- P. wyomingensis
- Pauromys schaubi
- Pseudotomus robustus
- Reithroparamys delicatissimus
- R. huerfanensis
- R. cf. debequensis
- Sciuravus bridgeri
- S. nitidus
- S. wilsoni
- Thisbemys perditus
- Tuscahomys ctenodactylops
- Microparamys sp.
- Paramys sp.
- Reithroparamys sp.
- Tillomys sp.
- Cylindrodontidae indet.
- Paramyidae indet.
- Rodentia indet.
- Sciuravidae indet.

Insectivora

- Apatemys bellulus
- A. bellus
- A. cf. whitakeri
- Labidolemur soricoides
- Unuchinia dysmathes
- Apatemys sp.

Leptictida

- Palaeictops cf. bicuspis
- Prodiacodon cf. concordiarcensis
- Prodiacodon cf. furor
- Prodiacodon cf. tauricinerei

Lipotyphla

- Cedrocherus aceratus
- Eoictops novaceki
- Entomolestes sp.
- Adapisoricinae indet.

Macroscelidea

- Aletodon cf. quadravus
- Apheliscus nitidus
- Apheliscus cf. insidiosus
- Dorraletes diminutivus
- Haplomylus speirianus
- Haplomylus cf. scottianus
- Litocherus lacunatus
- Scenopagus priscus
- Scenopagus sp.

Multituberculata

- Ectypodus cf. powelli
- Neoplagiaulax cf. hazeni
- Neoplagiaulax cf. hunteri
- Ptilodus kummae
- Mesodma sp.
- Ectypodus sp.
- Parectypodus sp.
- ?Prochetodon sp.
- Ptilodus sp.

Pantodonta

- Barylambda faberi
- Coryphodon armatus
- C. lobatus
- C. radians
- Coryphodon sp.

Pholidota

- Palaeanodon sp.

Placentalia

- Copecion brachypternus
- Ectocion collinus
- E. osbornianus
- E. superstes
- Hyopsodus loomisi
- H. minor
- H. minusculus
- H. paulus
- H. powellianus
- H. wortmani
- H. cf. mentalis
- H. cf. walcottianus
- Meniscotherium chamense
- M. cf. robustum
- M. cf. tapiacitum
- Phenacodus grangeri
- P. intermedius
- P. trilobatus
- P. vortmani
- Ectocion sp.
- Hyopsodus sp.
- Phenacodus sp.

Soricomorpha

- Leptacodon cf. munusculum
- Nyctitherium serotinum
- Leptacodon sp.
- Wyonycteris sp.

Taeniodonta

- Stylinodon mirus

Theriiformes

- Copedelphys innominata
- Herpetotherium knighti
- H. innominatum
- Peradectes elegans
- P. chesteri
- Peratherium edwardi
- P. marsupium
- Ectoganus sp.
- Oodectes sp.
- Paleotomus sp.
- Stylinodon sp.
- Uintacyon sp.
- Epoicotheriidae indet.
- Leptictidae indet.
- Marsupialia indet.
- Metacheiromyidae indet.
- Nyctitheriidae indet.
- Oxyaenidae indet.
- Pantolestidae indet.
- Stylinodontidae indet.

==== Birds ====
- Eocrex primus
- Limnofregata hutchisoni
- Presbyornis sp.

==== Reptiles ====
- Anosteira ornata
- Apodosauriscus minutus
- Arpadosaurus gazinorum
- A. sepulchralis
- Baena arenosa
- Boavus occidentalis
- Boverisuchus vorax
- Calamagras primus
- Dunnophis microechinus
- Echmatemys stevensoniana
- Echmatemys cf. cibollensis
- Emys wyomingensis
- Entomophontes incrustatus
- Eodiploglossus borealis
- cf. Eoglyptosaurus donohoei
- Glyptosaurus agmodon
- G. sylvestris
- Machaerosaurus torrejonensis
- Notomorpha testudinea
- Palaeoxantusia amara
- Palepidophyma lilliputiana
- Parasauromalus olseni
- Provaranosaurus fatuus
- Psilosemys wyomingensis
- Restes rugosus
- Saniwa ensidens
- Scincoideus grassator
- Suzanniwana revenanta
- Trionyx aequa
- Xenochelys lostcabinensis
- Xestops savagei
- X. vagans
- cf. Crocodylus affinis
- Allognathosuchus sp.
- Anolbanolis sp.
- Coniophis sp.
- Echmatemys sp.
- Tinosaurus sp.
- Palaeoxantusia sp.
- Paranolis sp.
- Parasauromalus sp.
- Procaimanoidea sp.
- Stylinodon sp.
- Suzanniwana sp.
- Tinosaurus sp.
- cf. Jepsibaena sp.
- cf. Restes sp.
- cf. Saniwa sp.
- Amphisbaenidae indet.
- Anguidae indet.
- Anguimorpha indet.
- Baenidae indet.
- Crocodylia indet.
- Crocodylidae indet.
- Emydidae indet.
- Gerrhonotinae indet.
- Glyptosaurinae indet.
- Helodermatidae indet.
- Iguania indet.
- Lacertilia indet.
- Squamata indet.
- Trionychidae indet.

==== Amphibians ====
- Caudata indet.

==== Bony fish ====
- Goniobasis carterii
- G. tenera
- Diplomystus sp.
- Lepisosteus sp.
- ?Notogoneus sp.
- Centrarchidae indet.
- aff. Amblyopsidae indet.
- Actinopterygii indet.

==== Cartilaginous fish ====
- Washakiebatis kirklandi

==== Invertebrates ====
Bivalves

- Asimina vesperalis
- Davidia antiqua
- Unio wasatchensis

Gastropods

- Viviparus paludinaeformis
- Ferrissia cf. minuta

Mollusks

- Mollusca indet.

==== Flora ====
- Allantodiopsis erosa
- Allophylus flexifolia
- Ampelopsis acerifolia
- Beringiaphyllum cupanioides
- Carya antiquorum
- Castanea intermedia
- Cercidiphyllum arcticum
- Cissus marginata
- Dillenites garfieldensis
- Dombeya novimundi
- Ficus artocarpoides
- Ficus planicostata
- Fraxinus eocenica
- Hovenia cf. oregonensis
- Metasequoia occidentalis
- Nyssa alata
- Osmunda greenlandica
- Penosphyllum cordatum
- Platanus raynoldsi
- Platycarya americana
- Populus wyomingiana
- Prunus corrugis
- Rhamnus goldiana
- cf. Schoepfia republicensis
- Stillingia casca
- Syzygioides americana
- Ternstroemites aureavallis
- Zizyphus fibrillosus
- Alnus sp.
- Celtis sp.
- Cinnamomophyllum sp.
- Sloanea sp.
- Apocynaceae indet.
- Dicotyledonae indet.
- Lauraceae indet.
- cf. Magnoliales indet.

==== Ichnofossils ====
- Lunulichnus tuberosus
- Arenicolites
- Camborygma
- Celliforma
- Palaeophycus
- Planolites
- Rusophycus
- Scoyenia
- Skolithos
- Spongeliomorpha
- Taenidium
- Thalassinoides
- cf. Ophiomorpha

=== Herbivore expansion ===
The mammal fauna of the formation is part of the fourth phase of herbivore expansion spanning about 115 Ma from the Aptian to Holocene, and correlated with the Wind River and Wilcox Formations of the United States and the Laguna del Hunco Formation of Argentina.

== Economic geology ==
=== Petroleum geology ===
The Wasatch Formation is a tight gas reservoir rock in the Greater Natural Buttes Field in the Uinta Basin of Utah and Colorado. The formation is characterized by porosity ranging from 6 to 20% and permeability of up to 1 mD. Based on 409 samples from the Wasatch Formation, average porosity is 8.75 percent and average permeability is 0.095 mD. The production rates after 2 years are 100–1,000 mscf/day for gas, 0.35–3.4 barrel per day for oil, and less than 1 barrel per day for water. The water:gas ratio ranges from 0.1 to 10 barrels per million standard cubic feet, indicating that free water is produced along with water dissolved in gas in the reservoir. Oil in the Bluebell-Altamont Field in the Uinta Basin and gas in the Piceance Creek Field in the Piceance Basin are produced from the Wasatch Formation.

As of May 2019, tight gas from the Wasatch Formation and underlying Mesaverde Group has been produced more than 1.76 trillion cubic feet (TCF) of gas from over 3,000 wells in the Uinta Basin, mostly from the Natural Buttes gas field in the eastern part of the basin. In the Piceance Basin, the Mesaverde Group and Wasatch Formation produced more than 7.7 TCF from over 12,000 wells, mostly from the central part of the basin.

=== Mining ===
==== Coal ====
Coal is mined from the Wasatch Formation in Wyoming. Together with the Fort Union Formation, the Wasatch Formation represents the thickest coal bed deposits in the state.

==== Uranium ====
The fluvial sandstones contain uranium roll front deposits. The formation is the main producer of uranium in the state. Ore zones contain uraninite and pyrite. Oxidized ores include uranophane, meta-autunite, and phosphuranylite.

== Wasatchian correlations ==
Wasatchian correlations in North America
Formation	Wasatch	DeBeque	Claron	Indian Meadows	Pass Peak	Tatman	Willwood	Golden Valley	Coldwater	Allenby	Kamloops	Ootsa Lake	Margaret	Nanjemoy	Hatchetigbee	Tetas de Cabra	Hannold Hill	Coalmont	Cuchara	Galisteo	San Jose	Ypresian (IUCS) • Itaboraian (SALMA) Bumbanian (ALMA) • Mangaorapan (NZ)
Basin	Powder River Uinta Piceance Colorado Plateau Wind River Green River Bighorn	Piceance	Colorado Plateau	Wind River	Green River	Bighorn		Williston	Okanagan	Princeton	Buck Creek	Nechako	Sverdrup	Potomac	GoM	Laguna Salada	Rio Grande	North Park	Raton	Galisteo	San Juan	Wasatch Formation (North America)
Country	United States								Canada					United States		Mexico	United States					Wasatch Formation (North America)
Copelemur																						Wasatch Formation (North America)
Coryphodon																						Wasatch Formation (North America)
Diacodexis																						Wasatch Formation (North America)
Homogalax																						Wasatch Formation (North America)
Oxyaena																						Wasatch Formation (North America)
Paramys																						Wasatch Formation (North America)
Primates																						Wasatch Formation (North America)
Birds																						Wasatch Formation (North America)
Reptiles																						Wasatch Formation (North America)
Fish																						Wasatch Formation (North America)
Insects																						Wasatch Formation (North America)
Flora																						Wasatch Formation (North America)
Environments	Alluvial-fluvio-lacustrine	Fluvial				Fluvial	Fluvio-lacustrine	Fluvial	Lacustrine		Fluvio-lacustrine		Deltaic-paludal	Shallow marine		Fluvial	Shallow marine	Fluvial		Fluvial		Wasatchian volcanoclastics Wasatchian fauna Wasatchian flora
Volcanic	Yes	No							Yes	No	Yes	No	Yes	No						Yes	No	Wasatchian volcanoclastics Wasatchian fauna Wasatchian flora

== See also ==
- List of fossiliferous stratigraphic units in Colorado
- List of fossiliferous stratigraphic units in Wyoming
- List of fossiliferous stratigraphic units in Utah
- Paleontology in Colorado
- Paleontology in Utah
- Paleontology in Wyoming
- 2014 West Salt Creek landslide
