= Bridger Formation =

Geologic formation in Wyoming, United States

- Stratigraphic range: Bridgerian - Uintan; ~ 49.09–45.57 Ma
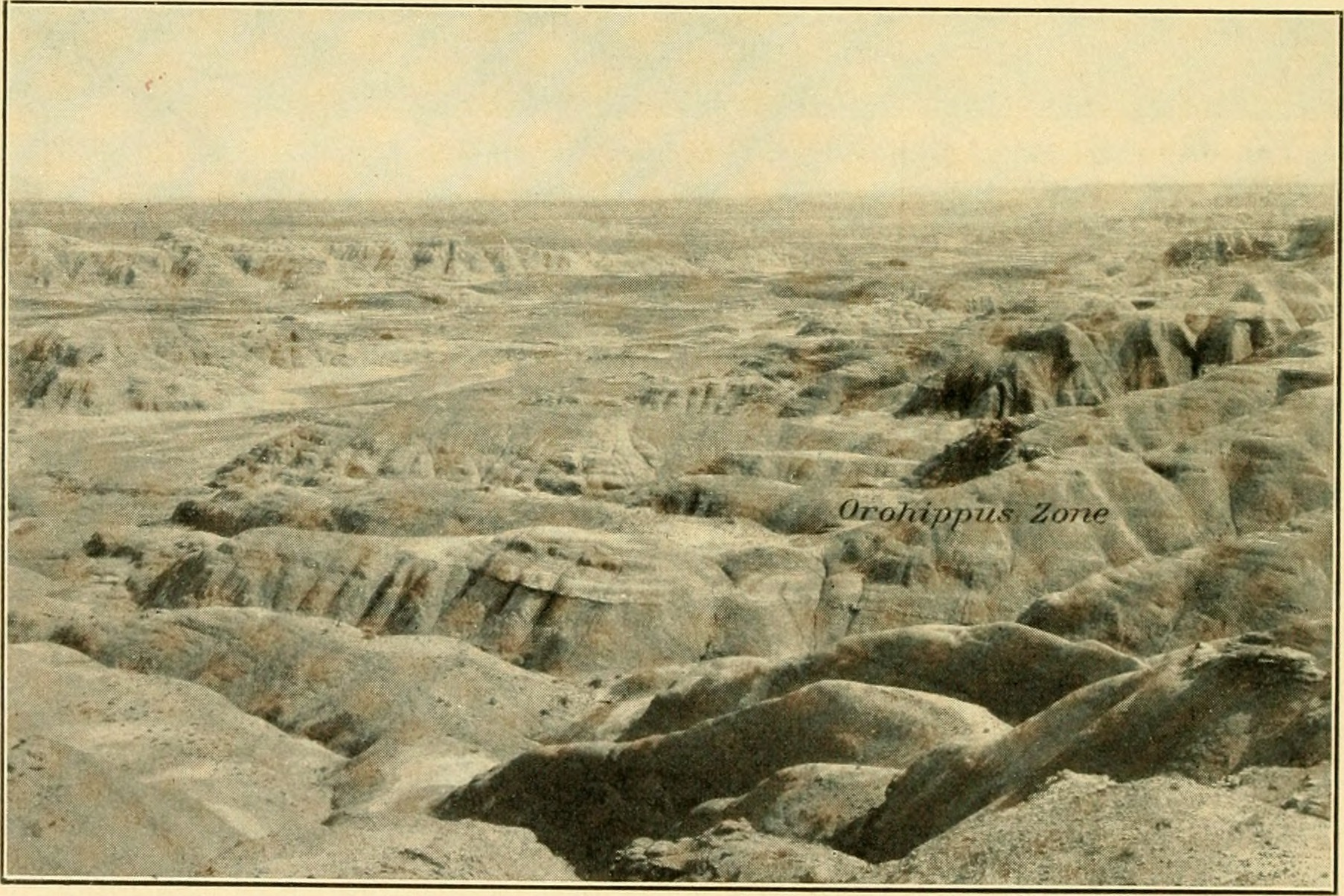
- Grizzly Buttes, a major feature of the Bridger Formation
- Type: Formation
- Underlies: Bishop Conglomerate
- Overlies: Green River Formation
- Thickness: 215 feet (66 m) - 270 feet (82 m)

Location
- Region: Wyoming
- Country: United States

Type section
- Named for: Bridger Wilderness
- Named by: F.V. Hayden
- Bridger Formation (the United States) Bridger Formation (Wyoming)

The Bridger Formation is a geologic formation in southwestern Wyoming. It preserves fossils dating back to the Bridgerian and Uintan stages of the Paleogene Period. The formation was named by American geologist Ferdinand Vandeveer Hayden for Fort Bridger, which had itself been named for mountain man Jim Bridger. The Bridger Wilderness covers much of the Bridger Formation's area.

== History ==
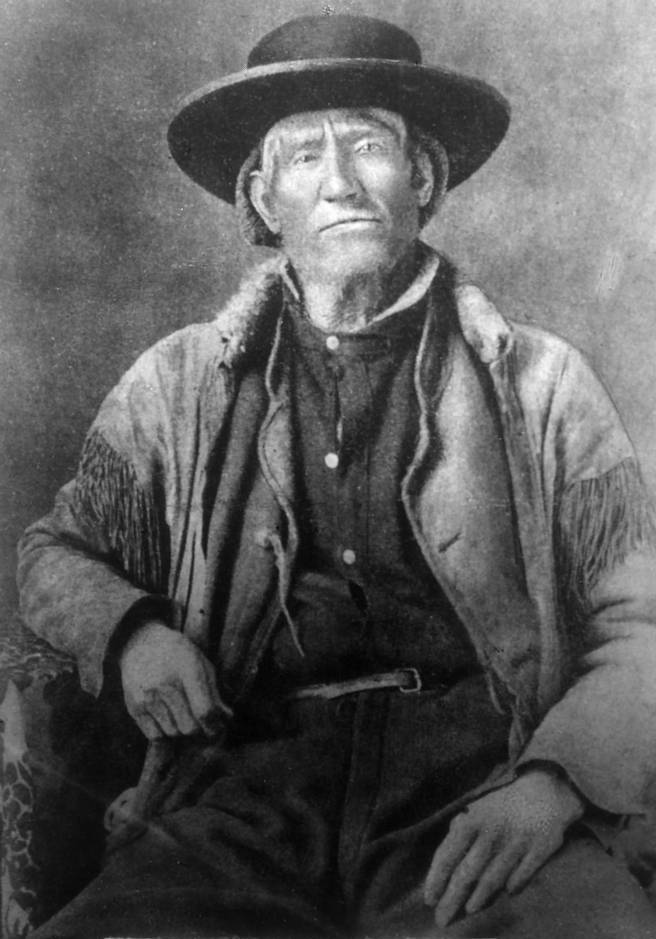
Jim Bridger

Before colonization, the lands making up the Bridger Formation had been inhabited by the Apsáalooke, Bannock, Eastern Shoshone, Hinono'eino, Očhéthi Šakówiŋ, Só'taeo'o, Tsétsêhéstâhese, and Ute nations. European settlers began to settle the area around the Bridger Formation in the 19th century, beginning with the establishment of the Oregon Trail in 1830. Fort Bridger – for which the formation would later be named – was established in 1843 by Jim Bridger and Louis Vasquez. In 1868, the remaining Indigenous communities in the area were displaced by the Treaty of Fort Bridger, removing them to the Fort Hall Indian Reservation and Wind River Indian Reservation.

The first documented fossils to be recovered from the Bridger Formation were discovered on 11 August 1849 by Captain Howard Stansbury, who documented the discovery of fossilized shells and wood in his expedition report while scouting out the region for the United States Army Corps of Topographical Engineers. In the early-1860s, trapper Jack Robinson claimed to have discovered a number of sites along the base of the Uinta Mountains where grizzly bears had been turned to stone. When these claims were called into question by judge William A. Carter, Robinson brought Carter a bag filled with the fossils. One of the specimens recovered by Robinson was a well-preserved skull which resembled that of a grizzly bear. Judger Carter invited Louis Agassiz to observe the local strata, but Agassiz declined as the journey would have involved riding horseback to the site, a mode of transportation Agassiz abhorred. Carter's son-in-law, Dr. J. Van A. Carter, would go on to send a number of fossils to palaeontologist Joseph Leidy at the University of Pennsylvania in 1869. These fossils included the first Bridgerian fossil taxa, Omomys carteri; and the skull discovered by Robinson, which was described as Palaeosyops paludosus. Another researcher responsible for sending off specimens was Dr. Joseph K. Corson, a close friend of Leidy's who hosted him and his family on two three to Fort Bridger in 1872, 1873, and 1879.

The Bridger Formation was described and named in 1869 by H.V. Hayden while conducting a geological survey in the region on behalf of the United States Geological and Geographical Survey of the Territories. The famously fossiliferous Bridger Formation attracted a number of famed palaeontologists including Henry Fairfield Osborn, William Berryman Scott, and F. Speir Jr. The Bridger Formation also became a battleground in the Bone Wars between Edward Drinker Cope and Othniel Charles Marsh.

The Bridger Formation did not see a proper scientific mission until 1903, when Walter W. Granger and William Diller Matthew initiated a three-year survey of the strata, during which time Matthew identified the Bridger Formation's distinct members by using local limestone layers as marker beds. Later expeditions brought other researchers to the region, including Charles Lewis Gazin.

== Geology ==
The Bridger Formation overlies the Green River Formation and underlies the Bishop Conglomerate. The boundary with the former occurs in the mid-Eocene after the region completed a transition to a drier environment from a moist climate in the early Eocene. Limestone deposits like the Sage Creek Formation separate the three distinct members which make up the Bridger Formation: Blacks Fork (Bridger B), Twin Buttes (Bridger C & D), and Turtle Bluff (Bridger E). The limestone surrounding the Bridger Formation was deposited on the beds of lakes and ponds at the site during the Eocene. William Diller Matthew used this limestone as marker beds in his initial description of the Bridger Formation in 1909.

Portions formerly considered to be part of the Bridger Formation have since been reassigned to the nearby Uinta Formation.

== Palaeobiology ==
Dozens of Early Eocene (50.3 - 46.2 Ma) mammalian and invertebrate genera are known from the Bridger Formation.

== Eutherians ==
=== Artiodactyls ===
==== Achaenodontidae ====
Genus	Species	Location	Stratigraphic position	Material	Images
Achaenodon	A. insolens	Wyoming		AMNH 5143, fragmentary mandible	
Achaenodon	A. robustus	Wyoming		PU 10033, partial skull and mandible	
Helohyus	H. lentus	Sweetwater County, Wyoming			
Helohyus	H. milleri	Sweetwater County, Wyoming	Bridger B & C		
Helohyus	H. plicodon	southwestern Wyoming	Bridger B & C		
Parahyus	P. vagus	Wyoming		YPM 10972, partial mandible	

==== Homacodontidae ====
Genus	Species	Location	Stratigraphic position	Material	Images
Antiacodon	A. pygmaeus	southwestern Wyoming	Bridger C & D		
Antiacodon	A. venustus	Sweetwater County, Wyoming	Bridger D	YPM 11765, a tooth	
Homacodon	H. vagans	southwestern Wyoming	Bridger C & D	YPM 13129, skull and jaws	
Microsus	M. cuspidatus	southwestern Wyoming	Bridger B - D		

=== Carnivoramorphans ===
==== Stem Carnivoramophans ====
Genus	Species	Location	Stratigraphic position	Material	Images
Oodectes	O. herpestoides	Uinta County, Wyoming		AMNH 140008, nearly-complete skull	

==== Miacidae ====
Genus	Species	Location	Stratigraphic position	Material	Images
Harpalodon	H. sylvestris	Washakie County, Wyoming			
Miacis	M. bathygnathus	Henry's Fork Hill, Sweetwater County, Wyoming	Bridger C		
Miacis	M. edax	Wyoming			
Miacis	M. parvivorus	Lincoln and Uinta Counties, Wyoming	Bridger B & C		
Miacis	M. vorax	Wyoming			
Miacis	M. vulpinus	Wyoming			
Miocyon	M. major	Blue Point Marker, Park County, Wyoming			
Uintacyon	U. jugulans	Henry's Fork Hill, Sweetwater County, Wyoming	Bridger C		
Vulpavus	V. ovatus	Little Dry Creek, Uinta County, Wyoming			
Vulpavus	V. profectus	Uinta County, Wyoming			

==== Viverravidae ====
Genus	Species	Location	Stratigraphic position	Material	Images
Viverravus	V. nitidus	Wyoming			

=== Carnivorans ===
Genus	Species	Location	Stratigraphic position	Material	Images
Palaearctonyx	P. meadi	Twin Buttes, Sweetwater Counties, Wyoming			

=== Cimolestans ===
==== Apatemyidae ====
Genus	Species	Location	Stratigraphic position	Material	Images
Apatemys	A. bellus	central and southern Wyoming	Bridger C	YPM 13512, partial mandible	
Apatemys	A. bellulus	southwestern and central Wyoming	Bridger C	YPM 13513, partial mandible; USNM 22386, mandible	

==== Esthonychidae ====
Genus	Species	Location	Stratigraphic position	Material	Images
Megalesthonyx	M. hopsoni	Wyoming			
Tillodon	T. fodiens	Millersville, Uinta County, Wyoming			
Trogosus	T. castoridens	southwestern Wyoming			
Trogosus	T. gazini	Uinta County, Wyoming		USNM 364762, partial skeleton	
Trogosus	T. hyracoides	Granger Station, Sweetwater County, Wyoming			
Trogosus	T. latidens	Lincoln and Sweetwater counties, Wyoming			
Trogosus	T. vetulus	Lincoln and Sweetwater counties, Wyoming			

==== Pantolestidae ====
Genus	Species	Location	Stratigraphic position	Material	Images
Pantolestes	P. elegans	Wyoming			
Pantolestes	P. intermedius	Wyoming			
Pantolestes	P. longieundus	Wyoming			
Pantolestes	P. natans	Wyoming			
Pantolestes	P. phocipes	Wyoming			

=== Creodontans ===
==== Hyaenodontidae ====
Genus	Species	Location	Stratigraphic position	Material	Images
Didelphodus	D. altidens	southwestern Wyoming			
Entemodon	E. comptus	Honeycomb Buttes, Fremont County, Wyoming			
Iridodon	I. datzae	Cathedral Bluffs, Sweetwater County, Wyoming		UMMP 103465, mandible	
Limnocyon	L. cuspidens	Ice Castle, Uinta County, Wyoming		UMMP 103465, mandible	
Limnocyon	L. medius	Henry's Fork Hill, Uinta County, Wyoming	Bridger D		
Limnocyon	L. velox	southwestern Wyoming			
Limnocyon	L. verus	Uinta County, Wyoming	Bridger C		
Prolimnocyon	P. antiquus	Sweetwater County, Wyoming			
Proviverra	P. americana	Wyoming			
Sinopa	S. aculeatus	Wyoming			
Sinopa	S. agilis	Uinta County, Wyoming			
Sinopa	S. eximia	Wyoming			
Sinopa	S. grangeri	Cottonwood Creek, Sublette County, Wyoming			
Sinopa	S. insectivorus	Cottonwood Creek, Sublette County, Wyoming			
Sinopa	S. major	southwestern Wyoming			
Sinopa	S. minor	Church Buttes, Uinta County, Wyoming			
Sinopa	S. pungens	Cottonwood Creek, Sublette County, Wyoming			
Sinopa	S. rapax	southwestern Wyoming			
Tritemnodon	T. hians	Wyoming			
Tritemnodon	T. strenuus	Davis Ranch, Johnson County, Wyoming			

==== Oxyaenidae ====
Genus	Species	Location	Stratigraphic position	Material	Images
Aelurotherium	A. bicuspis	Henry's Fork, Uinta County, Wyoming			
Aelurotherium	A. latidens	Grizzly Butte, Uinta County, Wyoming			
Machaeroides	M. eothen	Twin Buttes, Sweetwater County, Wyoming			
Machaeroides	M. simpsoni	Davis Ranch, Johnson County, Wyoming			
Patriofelis	P. ferox	central and southwestern Wyoming			
Patriofelis	P. ulta	southwestern Wyoming			

=== Dinoceratans ===
Genus	Species	Location	Stratigraphic position	Material	Images
Bathyopsis	B. fissidens	southwestern Wyoming	Bridger B.		
Eobasileus	E. cornutus	southwestern Wyoming			
Uintatherium	U. anceps	southwestern Wyoming	Bridger C & D.		

=== Eulipotyphlans ===
==== Erinaceomorpha ====
Genus	Species	Location	Stratigraphic position	Material	Images
Talpavus	T. nitidus	southwestern Wyoming	Bridger C	YPM 13511, fragmentary jaw	

==== Geolabididae ====
Genus	Species	Location	Stratigraphic position	Material	Images
Centetodon	C. bacchanalis	Hyopsodus Hill, Sublette County, Wyoming			
Centetodon	C. bembicophagus	southwestern Wyoming			
Centetodon	C. pulcher	southwestern Wyoming	Bridger C & D		
Marsholestes	M. dasypelix	Uinta County, Wyoming			

==== Nyctitheriidae ====
Genus	Species	Location	Stratigraphic position	Material	Images
Nyctilestes	N. serotinus	Uinta County, Wyoming			
Nyctitherium	N. gunnelli	Uinta County, Wyoming		SDSNH 110393, partial mandible	
Nyctitherium	N. priscus	Wyoming			
Nyctitherium	N. serotinum	central and southwestern Wyoming			
Nyctitherium	N. velox	Hyopsodus Hill, Sublette County, Wyoming			

=== Leptictidans ===
Genus	Species	Location	Stratigraphic position	Material	Images
Hypictops	H. syntaphus	Uinta County, Wyoming	Bridger D		
Palaeictops	P. bridgeri	central Wyoming			

=== Macroscelids ===
Genus	Species	Location	Stratigraphic position	Material	Images
Scenopagus	S. curtidens	western Wyoming			
Scenopagus	S. edenensis	southwestern Wyoming			
Scenopagus	S. priscus	western Wyoming			

=== Mesonychids ===
Genus	Species	Location	Stratigraphic position	Material	Images
Harpagolestes	H. immanis	southern Wyoming		AMNH 13143, a partial skull and jaws	
Harpagolestes	H. macrocephalus	Lincoln and Uinta counties, Wyoming			
Mesonyx	M. lanius	Wyoming			
Mesonyx	M. obtusidens	Uinta County, Wyoming			
Synoplotherium	S. canius	Bitter Creek, Sweetwater County, Wyoming			

=== Perissodactyls ===
==== Amynodontidae ====
Genus	Species	Location	Stratigraphic position	Material	Images
Orthocynodon	O. antiquus	Wyoming			

==== Brontotheriidae ====
Genus	Species	Location	Stratigraphic position	Material	Images
Palaeosyops	P. fontinalis	western Wyoming			
Palaeosyops	P. paludosus	central & southwestern Wyoming			
Palaeosyops	P. robustus	southwestern Wyoming			
Telmatherium	T. validus	Duncan Ranch, Fremont County, Wyoming	Bridger D	YPM 11120, a partial skull	
Telmatherium	T. validus	Sweetwater County, Wyoming	Bridger D	YPM 11120, a partial skull	
Mesatirhinus	M. junius	Duncan Ranch, Fremont County, Wyoming		PU 10008	

==== Equidae ====
Genus	Species	Location	Stratigraphic position	Material	Images
Oligotomus	O. cinctus	Wyoming			
Orohippus	O. agilis	Wyoming		YPM 1268, partial skeleton	
Orohippus	O. ballardi	Wyoming		YPM 1268, partial skeleton	
Orohippus	O. major	Millersville, Uinta County, Wyoming		YPM 11270, fragmentary maxilla	
Orohippus	O. osbornianus	Blacks Fork, Uinta County, Wyoming			
Orohippus	O. procyoninus	Wyoming			
Orohippus	O. progressus	Wyoming		AMNH 12120, partial skull	
Orohippus	O. pumilus	southwestern Wyoming			
Orohippus	O. sylvaticus	Uinta County, Wyoming			
Orohippus	O. uintanus	Wyoming			

==== Hyopsodontidae ====
Genus	Species	Location	Stratigraphic position	Material	Images
Hyopsodus	H. minusculus	southern and central Wyoming	Bridger B		
Hyopsodus	H. lepidus	southwestern Wyoming	Bridger C		
Hyopsodus	H. paulus	southwestern Wyoming	Bridger B - D		
Hyopsodus	H. pygmaeus	Wyoming			
Hyopsodus	H. tonski	north and central Wyoming			

==== Hyrachyidae ====
Genus	Species	Location	Stratigraphic position	Material	Images
Hyrachyus	H. eximius	southwestern Wyoming			
Hyrachyus	H. minor	southwestern Wyoming			
Hyrachyus	H. paradoxus	Wyoming			

==== Hyracodontidae ====
Genus	Species	Location	Stratigraphic position	Material	Images
Triplopus	T. cubitalis	Wyoming			
Triplopus	T. obliquidens	Wyoming			

==== Isectolophidae ====
Genus	Species	Location	Stratigraphic position	Material	Images
Isectolophus	I. latidens	Lone Tree, Uinta County, Wyoming	Bridger D	PU 10251, fragmentary skull; YPM 12563, partial skull	
Isectolophus	I. radinskyi	Lone Spring, Uinta County, Wyoming	Bridger D		

==== Tapiroidea ====
Genus	Species	Location	Stratigraphic position	Material	Images
Helaletes	H. nanus	central & southwestern Wyoming		YPM 11080, partial jaws and cheek teeth; YPM 11807, partial skeleton	

=== Palaeanodonta ===
Genus	Species	Location	Stratigraphic position	Material	Images
Brachianodon	B. westorum	southwestern Wyoming			
Metacheiromys	M. marshi	southwestern Wyoming	Bridger C		

=== Pholidotans ===
Genus	Species	Location	Stratigraphic position	Material	Images
Tetrapassalus	T. proius	southwestern Wyoming			

=== Plesiadapiformes ===
Genus	Species	Location	Stratigraphic position	Material	Images
Alveojunctus	A. minutus	Vass Quarry, Hot Springs County, Wyoming			

=== Primates ===
==== Microsyopidae ====
Genus	Species	Location	Stratigraphic position	Material	Images
Microsyops	M. angustidens	Blackrock Meadows, Teton County, Wyoming			
Microsyops	M. annectens	Sublette County, Wyoming			
Microsyops	M. elegans	southwestern Wyoming		YPM 11794, fragmentary mandible	
Microsyops	M. knightensis	Honeycomb Buttes, Sweetwater County, Wyoming		YPM 11794, fragmentary mandible	
Microsyops	M. scottianus	southern Wyoming		YPM 11794, fragmentary mandible	
Uintasorex	U. parvulus	southwestern Wyoming	Bridger D	AMNH 12052, partial mandible	

==== Notharctidae ====
Genus	Species	Location	Stratigraphic position	Material	Images
Notharctus	N. robinsoni	southwestern Wyoming		UW 3007, fragmentary mandibles	
Notharctus	N. robustior	southwestern Wyoming	Bridger C & D	USNM 3750, fragmentary mandibles	
Notharctus	N. tenebrosus	southwestern Wyoming			
Notharctus	N. venticolus	Sweetwater County, Wyoming		AMNH 4715b, partial upper and lower jaws	
Smilodectes	S. gracilis	southwestern Wyoming		YPM 11800, partial mandible	

==== Omomyidae ====
Genus	Species	Location	Stratigraphic position	Material	Images
Anaptomorphus	A. aemulus	southwestern Wyoming		AMNH 5010, partial mandible	
Anaptomorphus	A. westi	southwestern Wyoming			
Gazinius	G. amplus	central and southern Wyoming			
Gazinius	G. bowni	Uinta County, Wyoming			
Hemiacodon	H. engardae	Donna's Locality, Uinta County, Wyoming		UCM 67874, fragmentary mandible	
Hemiacodon	H. gracilis	Uinta County, Wyoming		YPM 11806, fragmentary mandible	
Omomys	O. carteri	southwestern Wyoming			
Trogolemur	T. myodes	Sweetwater County, Wyoming		AMNH 12399, partial mandible	
Washakius	W. insignis	southwestern Wyoming		ANSP 10332, partial mandible; AMNH 55672	

=== Rodentia ===
==== Cylindrodontidae ====
Genus	Species	Location	Stratigraphic position	Material	Images
Mysops	M. fraternus	Green Locality, Sweetwater County, Wyoming			
Mysops	M. minimus	Grizzly Buttes, Uinta County, Wyoming			
Mysops	M. parvus	Grizzly Buttes, Uinta County, Wyoming			

==== Ischyromyidae ====
Genus	Species	Location	Stratigraphic position	Material	Images
Acritoparamys	A. wyomingensis	southern Wyoming			
Leptotomus	L. parvus	southwestern Wyoming			
Mytonomys	M. coloradensis	Van Houten's Locality, Park County, Wyoming			
Paramys	P. delicatior	southwestern Wyoming			
Paramys	P. delicatus	southwestern Wyoming			
Pseudotomus	P. hians	Cottonwood Creek, Sublette County, Wyoming			
Pseudotomus	P. horribilis	Grizzly Buttes, Uinta County, Wyoming		AMNH 5025, skull	
Pseudotomus	P. robustus	southwestern Wyoming			
Quadratomus	Q. grandis	southwestern Wyoming			
Thisbemys	T. corrugatus	southern and central Wyoming			
Thisbemys	T. perditus	Sweetwater County, Wyoming			

==== Paramyidae ====
Genus	Species	Location	Stratigraphic position	Material	Images
Franimys	F. buccatus	Wyoming			

==== Reithroparamyidae ====
Genus	Species	Location	Stratigraphic position	Material	Images
Reithroparamys	R. delicatissimus	western Wyoming			
Reithroparamys	R. huerfanensis	southern Wyoming			

==== Sciuravidae ====
Genus	Species	Location	Stratigraphic position	Material	Images
Knightomys	K. cuspidatus	Vass Quarry, Hot Springs County, Wyoming			
Knightomys	K. depressus	central and southern Wyoming			
Knightomys	K. huerfanensis	central and southern Wyoming			
Knightomys	K. senior	central and southern Wyoming			
Taxymys	T. lucaris	Sublette County, Wyoming			
Tillomys	T. parvidens	Grizzly Buttes, Uinta County, Wyoming			
Tillomys	T. senex	Sublette County, Wyoming			

== Metatherians ==
=== Herpetotheriidae ===
Herpetotheriids reported from the Bridger Formation
Genus	Species	Location	Stratigraphic position	Material	Images
Herpetotherium	H. innominatum	western Wyoming			
Herpetotherium	H. knighti	western Wyoming			
Peratherium	P. comstocki	central Wyoming			
Peratherium	P. marsupium	southwestern Wyoming			

=== Peradectidae ===
Peradectids reported from the Bridger Formation
Genus	Species	Location	Stratigraphic position	Material	Images
Armintodelphys	A. blacki	Lightning Butte, Sweetwater County, Wyoming			
Peradectes	P. chesteri	southwestern Wyoming			

== Birds ==
=== Gruiformes ===
Gruiformes reported from the Bridger Formation
Genus	Species	Location	Stratigraphic position	Material	Images
Aletornis	A. bellus	Grizzly Buttes, Uinta County, Wyoming			
Aletornis	A. gracilis	Henry's Fork, Sweetwater County, Wyoming			
Aletornis	A. nobilis	Grizzly Buttes, Uinta County, Wyoming			
Aletornis	A. pernix	Henry's Fork, Sweetwater County, Wyoming			
Aletornis	A. venustus	Henry's Fork, Sweetwater County, Wyoming			

=== Strigiformes ===
Owls reported from the Bridger Formation
Genus	Species	Location	Stratigraphic position	Material	Images
Minerva	M. leptosteus	Grizzly Buttes, Uinta County, Wyoming		YUPM 512, partial tibia	
Minerva	M. saurodosis	Lodge-Pole Trail, Uinta County, Wyoming		ANSP 9131, partial humerus	

== Fish ==
=== Amiidae ===
Amia includes the genus jr synonyms Hypamia, Protamia, and Pappichthys. The amiids A. (Pr.) gracilis and A. (Pr.) media were first listed as Bridger Formation taxa, but were listed as from the Laney Member of the Green river Formation by Grande and Bemis (1998). The species A. (Pa.) cornsonii, A. depressus, A. (H.) elegans, and A. newberrianus are either Bridger formation or Green River Formation per Grande and Bemis.

Genus	Species	Location	Stratigraphic position	Material	Notes	Images
Amia	A. (Pa.) cornsonii	"Upper Green River", southwestern Wyoming		USNM 3961, a centrum and dentary fragment (holotype); USNM 5476, 5475 and 3960 isolated centra (plesiotypes)	Nomen dubium per Grande & Bemis (1998) as Amiinae indeterminate	
Amia	A. depressus	"Southwestern Wyoming"		Isolated "vertebrae and cranial bones" (Holotype, now lost?)	Nomen dubium per Grande & Bemis (1998) as Amiinae indeterminate	
Amia	A. (H.) elegans	Dry Creek, Uinta County, Wyoming		ANSP 5580, isolated centrum	Nomen dubium per Grande & Bemis (1998) as Amiinae indeterminate	
Amia	A. (Pr.) laevis	"Cottonwood Creek", Wyoming		USNM 3968 - Fragmentary premaxilla, dentary, quadrate, cranium, branchiostegal, pterygoid, and two centra	Nomen dubium per Grande & Bemis (1998) as Amiinae indeterminate	
Amia	A. newberrianus	"Southwestern Wyoming"		ANSP 5632, vertebral centrum (Now lost?)	Nomen dubium per Grande & Bemis (1998) as Amiinae indeterminate	
Amia	A. (Pa.) plicatus	Wyoming		AMNH 2539 - skull bones and vertebrae (syntypes); USNM 3958 - skull bones and vertebrae (syntypes)	Nomen dubium per Grande & Bemis (1998) as Amiinae indeterminate	
Amia	A. (Pa.) sclerops	"bluffs of Cottonwood Creek", Wyoming		USNM 3965, partial left dentary	Nomen dubium per Grande & Bemis (1998) as Amiinae indeterminate	
Amia	A. (Pr.) uintaensis	Dry Creek Cañon, Uinta County, Wyoming		ANSP 3151, 5558, 5622, 8044 - vertebral centra, a basioccipital (Syntypes)	Nomen dubium per Grande & Bemis (1998) as Amiinae indeterminate	

=== Ariidae ===
Genus	Species	Location	Stratigraphic position	Material	Images
Rhineastes	R. peltatus	Wyoming			
Rhineastes	R. smithii	Wyoming			

=== Lepisosteidae ===
Genus	Species	Location	Stratigraphic position	Material	Images
Lepisosteus	L. atrox	Wyoming			
Lepisosteus	L. simplex	Wyoming			

=== Osteoglossidae ===
Genus	Species	Location	Stratigraphic position	Material	Images
Phareodus	P. encaustus	Wyoming			
Phareodus	P. testis	Wyoming			

== Reptiles ==
=== Crocodilia ===
Crocodilians reported from the Bridger Formation
Genus	Species	Location	Stratigraphic position	Material	Images
Crocodilus	C. elliottii	Wyoming			
Crocodilus	C. grypus	Wyoming			
Crocodilus	C. parvus	Wyoming			
Crocodilus	C. sulciferus	Wyoming			
Boverisuchus	B. vorax	Wyoming			
Borealosuchus	B. wilsoni	Wyoming			
Allognathosuchus	A. polyodon	Wyoming			
Brachyuranochampsa	B. zangerli	Wyoming			

=== Squamates ===
==== Anguidae ====
Anguids reported from the Bridger Formation
Genus	Species	Location	Stratigraphic position	Material	Images
Glyptosaurus	G. sphenodon	Henry's Fork, Sweetwater County, Wyoming		YPM 1051, partial maxilla and two teeth	
Glyptosaurus	G. sylvestris	Big Horn and Uinta counties, Wyoming		YPM 526, left frontal; YPM 521, fragmentary skull and jaws; several cervical and dorsal vertebrae; and several osteoderms; YPM 522, a skull fragment; frontal; and two body scutes; YPM 523, patch of cranial scutes	
Paraglyptosaurus	P. princeps	southwestern Wyoming		YPM 524, partially-complete skull and jaw; dermal scutes; USNM 6004, partially-complete skull; YPM 525, partially-complete frontal bones	
Xestops	X. vagans	southwestern Wyoming		YPM 541, partial skeleton; AMNH 3819, left frontal	

==== Boidae ====
Boas reported from the Bridger Formation
Genus	Species	Location	Stratigraphic position	Material	Images
Boavus	B. brevis	Grizzly Buttes, Uinta County, Wyoming		PMNH 468, a thoracic vertebra	
Boavus	B. occidentalis	Grizzly Buttes, Uinta County, Wyoming		PMNH 511, a dorsal vertebra; YPM 467, vertebra; YPM 2765, vertebra; YPM 2766, vertebra	
Lithophis	L. sargenti	Grizzly Buttes, Uinta County, Wyoming		YPM 2719, a thoracic vertebra	
Protagras	P. lacustris	Cottonwood Creek, Sublette County, Wyoming			

==== Chamaeleonidae ====
Chameleons reported from the Bridger Formation
Genus	Species	Location	Stratigraphic position	Material	Images
Tinosaurus	T. pristinus	Uinta County, Wyoming		PAS 9134, partial dentary and eight teeth	
Tinosaurus	T. stenodon	Henry's Fork Hill, Sweetwater County, Wyoming		YUM 615, partial dentary and three teeth	

==== Rhineuridae ====
Rhineurids reported from the Bridger Formation
Genus	Species	Location	Stratigraphic position	Material	Images
Lestophis	L. anceps	Grizzly Buttes, Uinta County, Wyoming		YPM 520, vertebra	
Lestophis	L. crassus	Marsh Creek, Uinta County, Wyoming		YPM 531, cervical vertebra	
Spathorhynchus	S. fossorium	Twin Buttes, Sweetwater County, Wyoming	Bridger B		

==== Teiidae ====
Teiids reported from the Bridger Formation
Genus	Species	Location	Stratigraphic position	Material	Images
Iguanavus	I. exilis	Henry's Fork, Sweetwater County, Wyoming			

==== Varanidae ====
Varanids reported from the Bridger Formation
Genus	Species	Location	Stratigraphic position	Material	Images
Saniwa	S. ensidens	southern Wyoming		USNM 2185, partial skeleton and skull; LACM CIT 5117, four vertebrae; YPM 609, partial skeleton and a tooth; YPM 610, fragmentary skeleton including several vertebrae; YPM 611, partial vertebra; YPM 612, partial skeleton	
Saniwa	S. major	Lodge-Pole Trail, Uinta County, Wyoming			

=== Testudines ===
==== Baenidae ====
Baenids reported from the Bridger Formation
Genus	Species	Location	Stratigraphic position	Material	Images
Baena	B. arenosa	Uinta County, Wyoming		USNM 103, partial carapace; AMNH 1675, carapace; AMNH 5971, skull; carapace; vertebrae; AMNH 5977, mostly-complete skeleton; ANSP 10055, carapace; CM 3227, partial carapace; CM 3406, nearly-complete carapace	
Chisternon	C. hebraicum	Cottonwood Creek, Sublette County, Wyoming	Bridger B	USNM 2275, partial carapace	
Chisternon	C. undatum	Uinta County, Wyoming			

==== Carettochelyidae ====
Carettochelyids reported from the Bridger Formation
Genus	Species	Location	Stratigraphic position	Material	Images
Anosteira	A. ornata	southwestern Wyoming			
Anosteira	A. radulina	Ham's Fork, Lincoln County, Wyoming		USNM 4096, partial carapace	

==== Dermatemydidae ====
Dermatemydids reported from the Bridger Formation
Genus	Species	Location	Stratigraphic position	Material	Images
Baptemys	B. wyomingensis	Natrona and Uinta Counties, Wyoming		AMNH 5934, complete carapace; fragmentary cervical vertebrae; pelvis; AMNH 5967, partially-complete skull; crushed carapace; YPM 484, nearly complete skull; crushed carapace with complete plastron; partial limb bones; one complete toe	

==== Emydidae ====
Emydids reported from the Bridger Formation
Genus	Species	Location	Stratigraphic position	Material	Images
Emys	E. jaensi	Sweetwater County, Wyoming		USNM 962, partial carapace	
Emys	E. latilabiatus	Blacks Fork, Uinta County, Wyoming			
Emys	E. stevensonianus	Fort Bridger, Uinta County, Wyoming		USNM 963, partial carapace; USNM 965, partial carapace; USNM 967, partial carapace	
Emys	E. wyomingensis	Fort Bridger, Uinta County, Wyoming		ANSP 9777, plastron fragment	
Hybemys	H. arenarius	Little Sandy Creek, Sublette County, Wyoming			

==== Geoemydidae ====
Geoemydids reported from the Bridger Formation
Genus	Species	Location	Stratigraphic position	Material	Images
Echmatemys	E. haydeni	Levett Creek Quarry, Uinta County, Wyoming		USNM 109, partial carapace	
Echmatemys	E. septaria	Uinta County, Wyoming			
Echmatemys	E. wyomingensis	Uinta County, Wyoming			

==== Testudinidae ====
Testudinids reported from the Bridger Formation
Genus	Species	Location	Stratigraphic position	Material	Images
Hadrianus	H. allabiatus	Cottonwood Creek, Sublette County, Wyoming	Bridger B		
Hadrianus	H. corsoni	Cottonwood Creek, Sublette County, Wyoming	Bridger B	ANSP 10050, plastron	
Hadrianus	H. octonaria	Cottonwood Creek, Sublette County, Wyoming	Bridger B		
Hadrianus	H. quadratus	Cottonwood Creek, Sublette County, Wyoming	Bridger B		

==== Trionychidae ====
Trionychids reported from the Bridger Formation
Genus	Species	Location	Stratigraphic position	Material	Images
Apalone	A. extensa	Grizzly Buttes, Uinta County, Wyoming		AMNH 5951, partial carapace	
Apalone	A. heteroglypta	Wyoming			
Apalone	A. postera	Uinta County, Wyoming	Bridger C	AMNH 6133, partial carapace	
Apalone	A. trionychoides	Cottonwood Creek, Sublette County, Wyoming		USNM 4094, partial carapace	
Axestemys	A. byssina	Blacks Fork, Sweetwater County, Wyoming		USNM 4089, partial skeleton; USNM 12589, fragmentary skull and partial plastron	
Axestemys	A. cerevisia	Opal, Lincoln County, Wyoming		UW 2382, carapace with plastron; cervical vertebra; partial girdles	
Axestemys	A. salebrosa	Dry Creek, Uinta County, Wyoming	Bridger C	AMNH 3941, partial carapace	
Axestemys	A. uintaensis	Little Dry Creek, Uinta County, Wyoming			
Hummelichelys	H. annae	Sweetwater County, Wyoming		FMNH P 27241, nearly-complete carapace with plastron	
Hummelichelys	H. ellipticus	Grizzly Buttes, Uinta County, Wyoming		AMNH 1117, carapace	
Hummelichelys	H. grangeri	Cottonwood Creek, Sublette County, Wyoming		AMNH 3942, partial carapace	
Hummelichelys	H. guttatus	Uinta County, Wyoming			
Plastomenus	P. molopinus	Grizzly Buttes, Uinta County, Wyoming		AMNH 6072, fragmentary carapace	
Plastomenus	P. oedemius	Sublette and Uinta Counties, Wyoming	Bridger B	AMNH 3937, a partial carapace	
Plastomenus	P. tantillus	Cottonwood Creek, Sublette County, Wyoming	Bridger B	AMNH 6018, partial carapace	
Plastomenus	P. thomasi	Sublette and Uinta Counties, Wyoming		AMNH 5980, nearly-complete carapace with plastron	
Plastomenus	P. visendus	Rattlesnake Hills, Fremont County, Wyoming		AMNH 1895, carapace	
Platypeltis	P. serialis				
Platypeltis	P. trepida	Grizzly Buttes, Uinta County, Wyoming		AMNH 5925, partial carapace	
Trionyx	T. concentricus	Cottonwood Creek, Sublette County, Wyoming		AMNH 1049, partial carapace	

=== Incertae sedis ===
Reptiles of uncertain placement reported from the Bridger Formation
Genus	Species	Location	Stratigraphic position	Material	Images
Naocephalus	N. porrectus	Cottonwood Creek, Sublette County, Wyoming	Bridger B		

== See also ==
- List of fossiliferous stratigraphic units in Wyoming
- Paleontology in Wyoming
