= Uintasorex =

Scientific classification
- Kingdom: Animalia
- Phylum: Chordata
- Class: Mammalia
- Order: †Plesiadapiformes
- Family: †Microsyopidae
- Subfamily: †Uintasoricinae
- Genus: †Uintasorex

Type species
- †Uintasorex parvulus Matthew, 1909

Species
- †Uintasorex montezumicus Lillegraven, 1976; †Uintasorex parvulus Matthew, 1909; †Uintasorex cf. sp. Gazin, 1958

Eocene primate from North America

Uintasorex is a genus of primate which lived in North America during the Eocene epoch. Fossils belonging to Uintasorex have been dated to the Bridgerian and Uintan stages, roughly 50.3 to 42 million years ago.

== Etymology ==
The genus name derives from the Latin word for "shrew" (-sorex), combined with a reference to the Uinta Mountains where the holotype fossils were discovered.

== Description ==
Like other microsyopids, the most discussed feature of Uintasorex is its extremely tiny size. It is thought to have been smaller than the mouse lemur, the smallest extant primate. Uintasorex was once thought to have been insectivorous based on its body mass and the principle of Kay's threshold, which suggested that primates lighter than 500 grams tend to be insectivorous and those heavier than 500 grams are folivorous, but the validity of this rule has come into question and can no longer be considered valid.

The hardness of their enamel allowed Uintasorex teeth to endure long enough after death to undergo fossilization, and much of what is known about the genus comes from dental remains. A defining feature of microsyopids is a distinctive twinning between the hypoconulid-entoconid cusps of the molars, and within the family this feature is most developed in Uintasorex. Well-defined crests on the upper and lower molars suggest the presence of interradicular fibers, a trait seen in other uintasoricinids. Uintasorex sp. is distinguished from U. parvulus by a larger tooth size.

== Discovery and species ==
The first specimen of Uintasorex (YPM VP 013519) was discovered by John W. Chew and L. Lamothe in July 1874. The fossils were uncovered at the Henry's Fork locality of the Bridger Formation in Sweetwater County, Wyoming. Other specimens of Uintasorex have been recovered from the Bridger Formation at the Hypsodus Hill, Twin Buttes, and Tabernacle Butte locality, as well as the Friars Formation, Green River Formation, Tepee Trail Formation, and Wasatch Formation.

The type species of Uintasorex is U. parvulus. Other species include U. montezumicus and an as-yet unnamed species tenatively known as "Uintasorex sp.". U. montezumicus is defined by UCMP 104179, a tooth recovered from the Solstice Hill locality of the Friars Formation in California. Uintasorex sp. is based on a collection of tiny Uintasorex teeth recovered from the Green River Formation in Utah which went uncatalogued in the archives of the Carnegie Museum of Natural History until they were rediscovered and described by Charles L. Gazin in 1958.

== Classification ==
Uintasorex was described by William Diller Matthew in 1909 and assigned to Apatemyidae because of its resemblance to Apatemys, Phenacolemur, Trogolemur, and some other fossil tarsiers. William King Gregory supported this classification when he proposed the order Soricomorpha in 1910, as did Edward Troxell in June 1923. In the coming decades, however, the genus was shuffled among a number of families including Anaptomorphidae (Gazin 1958; Robinson 1966, 1968; Simons 1963; Simpson 1940, 1959); Chiromyidae (Teilhard 1922); Plesiadapidae (Scholosser 1923, Abel 1931); and Primates, incertae sedis (Simpson 1945). For much of the 20th century, there was much controversy over whether microsyopsids belonged to Primates or Insectivora, but the latter is now considered a wastebasket taxon.

In 1969 two genera, Uintasorex and Niptomomys, were reassigned by anthropologist Frederick Szalay to Uintasoricinae, a new subfamily within Microsyopidae. The suggestion that Uintasorex had been a microsyopid was first privately put forward by Donald E. Russell in 1965, and the idea that the species represented a distinct family from the other taxa it was being grouped received its first mention as a footnote in a 1958 paper by Charles L. Gazin. The relationship was formally established when Szalay assigned previously-unstudied dental fragments to specimen AMNH 55664, Uintasorex teeth collected from the Tabernacle Butte locality in Wyoming, identifying the distinct dental features that are now considered ubiquitous in the family Uintasoricinae. Alveojunctus, Berruvius, Navajovius, and Palenochtha have also been included in Uintasoricinae.
