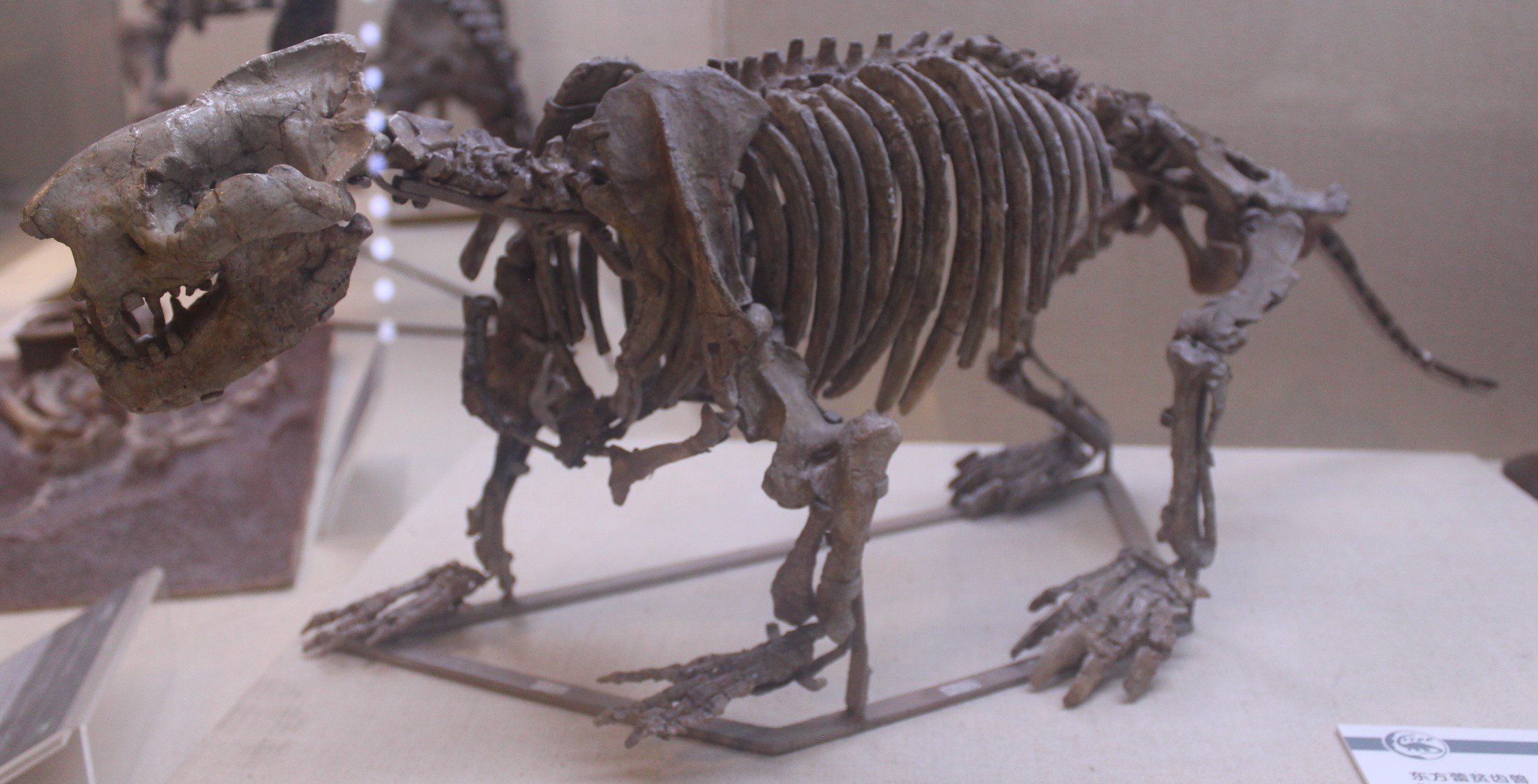
- Holotype skeleton (IVPP V5596) of E. antelios, Paleozoological Museum of China
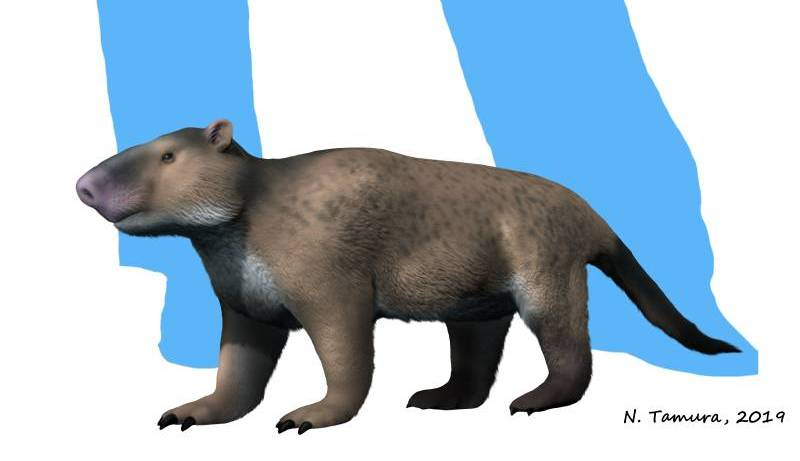
- Reconstruction of Ernanodon antelios

Scientific classification
- Kingdom: Animalia
- Phylum: Chordata
- Class: Mammalia
- Infraclass: Placentalia
- Order: †Palaeanodonta
- Family: †Ernanodontidae
- Genus: †Ernanodon; Ding, 1979

Type species
- †Ernanodon antelios Ding, 1979

= Ernanodon =

Ernanodon Temporal range: 62.22–56.0 Ma middle to late Paleocene

Extinct genus of mammal

Ernanodon ("a sprout of toothless animals") is an extinct genus of placental mammal from extinct family Ernanodontidae within extinct order Palaeanodonta, that lived from the middle to late Paleocene in China (Nongshan Formation) and Mongolia.

== Characteristics of taxa and history of classification ==
Ernanodon antelios was a relatively small animal about 50 centimetres (20 in) in length, not including the tail. When it was first discovered and examined, it was thought to be a primitive anteater. It and Eurotamandua of Eocene Germany helped to support a now-abandoned hypothesis that there was movement between the faunas of South America (the homeland of anteaters and other xenarthrans), and the faunas of Europe and Asia, by way of North America. This was further supported by the alleged European Phorusrhacid Strigogyps, also of Eocene Germany.

The view of E. antelios being an anteater has been discarded, and the idea that there was any extensive Paleocene faunal interchange with South America has been rethought due to Eurotamandua being now regarded as a scaleless relative of the modern-day pangolin.

E. antelios' placement within Xenarthra is further questioned because it lacks the distinctive joints that characterize Xenarthra, the same reason why Eurotamandua is no longer regarded as a xenarthran. Recent studies from new remains found in Late Paleocene Mongolian strata have led to the assessment that E. antelios is closely related to genus Metacheiromys within the order Palaeanodonta, which in the study, was reaffirmed to be the sister taxon of order Pholidota (the pangolins).

== See also ==
- Mammal classification
- Ernanodontidae
