= Osmunda greenlandica =

Scientific classification
- Kingdom: Plantae
- Clade: Tracheophytes
- Division: Polypodiophyta
- Class: Polypodiopsida
- Order: Osmundales
- Family: Osmundaceae
- Genus: Osmunda
- Species: †O. greenlandica

Binomial name
- †Osmunda greenlandica (Heer) Brown

Extinct species of fern

Osmunda greenlandica is an extinct species of ferns in the genus Osmunda.
