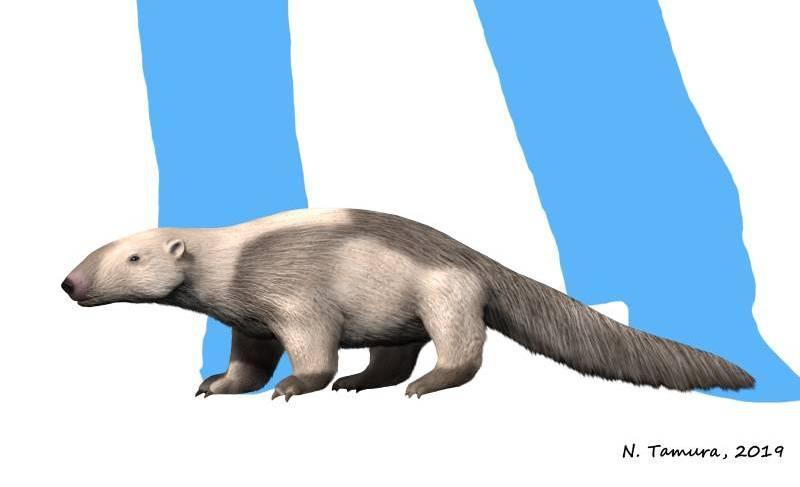
- Reconstruction of Metacheiromys marshi
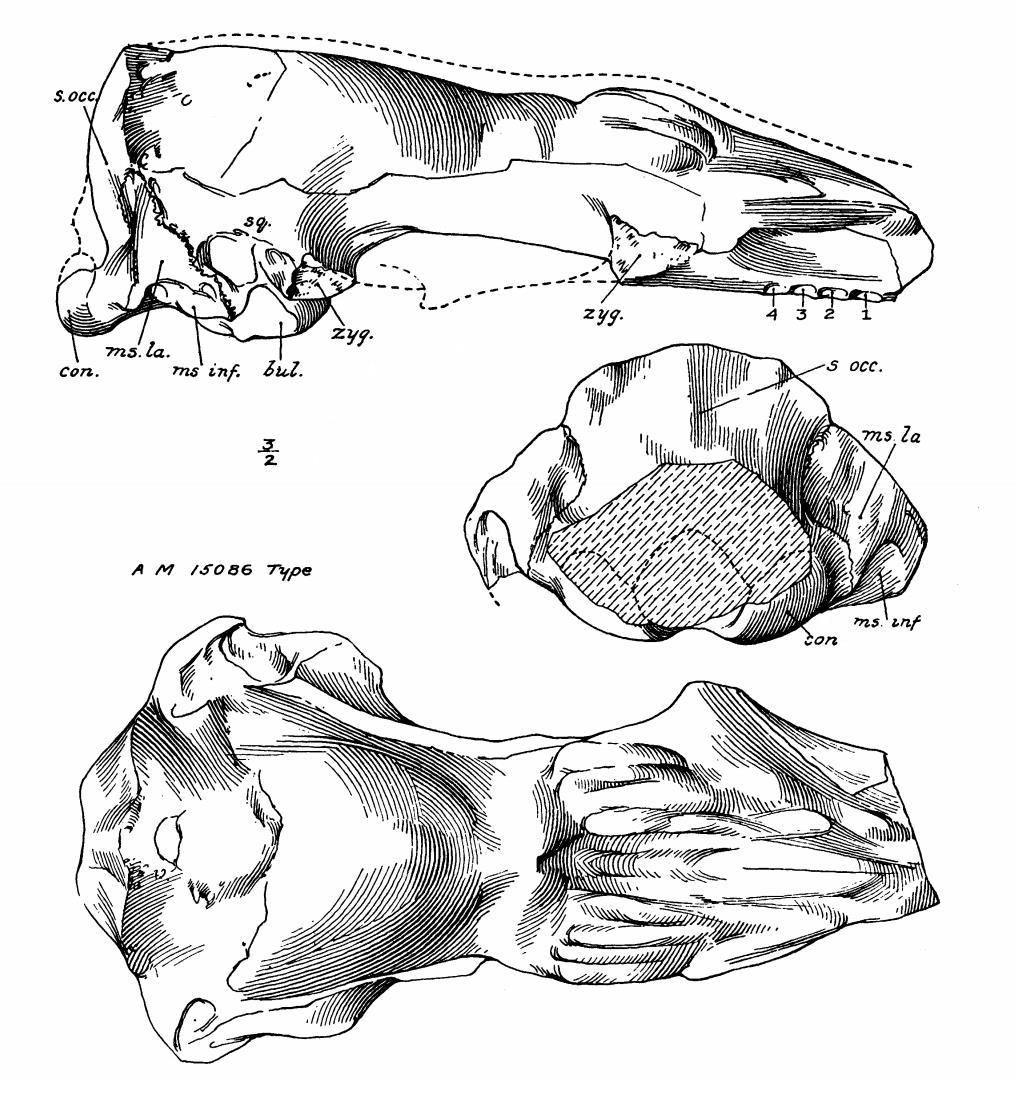
- skull of Palaeanodon ignavus

Scientific classification
- Kingdom: Animalia
- Phylum: Chordata
- Class: Mammalia
- Order: †Palaeanodonta
- Family: †Metacheiromyidae; Wortman, 1903

Type genus
- †Metacheiromys Wortman, 1903

Genera
- [see classification]

Synonyms
- Metachiromyidae (Wortman, 1903)

= Metacheiromyidae =

Metacheiromyidae Temporal range: 57.4–46.2 Ma late Paleocene to middle Eocene

Extinct family of mammals

Metacheiromyidae ("next to Cheiromys") is an extinct paraphyletic family of myrmecophagous placental mammals within extinct order Palaeanodonta, that lived in North America and Europe from the late Paleocene to middle Eocene.

== Classification and phylogeny ==
=== Taxonomy ===
- Family: †Metacheiromyidae ^{(paraphyletic family)} (Pilgrim, 1932)
  - Genus: †Brachianodon (Gunnell & Gingerich, 1993)
    - †Brachianodon westorum (Gunnell & Gingerich, 1993)
  - Genus: †Mylanodon (Secord, 2002)
    - †Mylanodon rosei (Secord, 2002)
  - Subfamily: †Metacheiromyinae ^{(paraphyletic subfamily)} (Wortman, 1903)
    - Genus: †Metacheiromys (Wortman, 1903)
      - †Metacheiromys dasypus (Osborn, 1904)
      - †Metacheiromys marshi (Wortman, 1903)
    - Genus: †Palaeanodon (Matthew, 1918)
      - †Palaeanodon ignavus (Matthew, 1918)
      - †Palaeanodon nievelti (Gingerich, 1989)
      - †Palaeanodon parvulus (Matthew, 1918)
      - †Palaeanodon sp. [Le Quesnoy] (Gheerbrant, 2005)
  - Subfamily: †Propalaeanodontinae (Schoch, 1984)
    - Genus: †Propalaeanodon (Rose, 1979)
      - †Palaeanodon parvulus (Rose, 1979)

== See also ==
- Mammal classification
- Palaeanodonta
