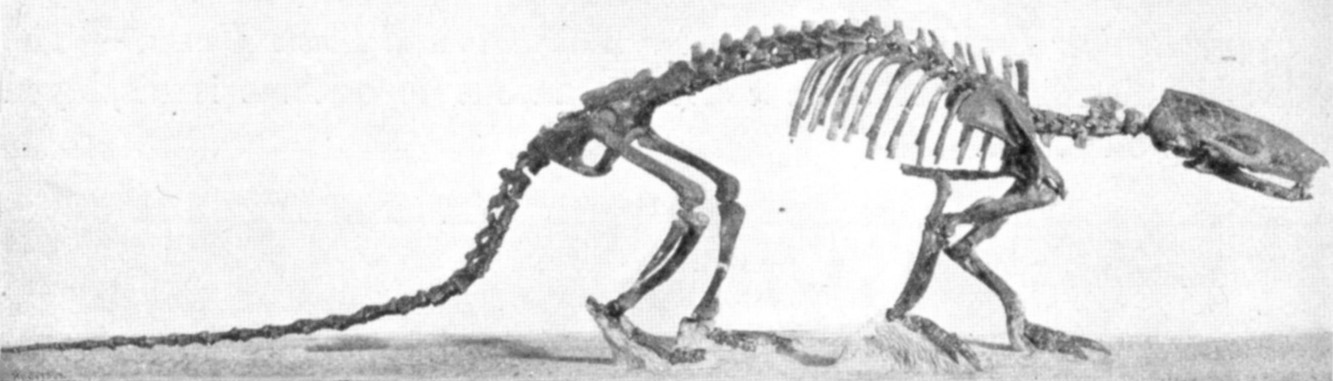
- Skeleton of Metacheiromys marshi
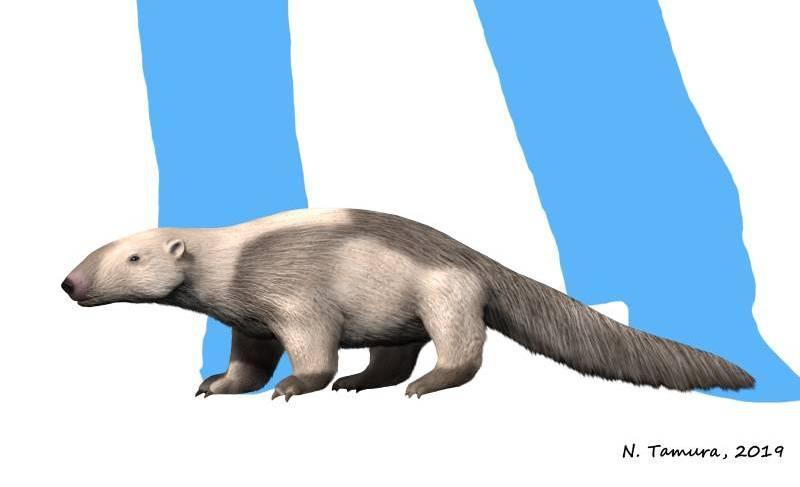
- Reconstruction of Metacheiromys marshi

Scientific classification
- Kingdom: Animalia
- Phylum: Chordata
- Class: Mammalia
- Order: †Palaeanodonta
- Family: †Metacheiromyidae
- Subfamily: †Metacheiromyinae
- Genus: †Metacheiromys; Wortman, 1903

Type species
- †Metacheiromys marshi Wortman, 1903

Species
- †M. dasypus (Osborn, 1904); †M. marshi (Wortman, 1903)

Synonyms
- synonyms of species: M. dasypus: Metacheiromys osborni (Simpson, 1931); M. marshi: Metacheiromys tatusia (Osborn, 1904)

= Metacheiromys =

Metacheiromys Temporal range: 50.0–46.2 Ma early to middle Eocene

Extinct genus of mammal

Metacheiromys ("next to Cheiromys") is an extinct genus of placental mammals belonging to the extinct paraphyletic subfamily Metacheiromyinae within the extinct paraphyletic family Metacheiromyidae in the extinct order Palaeanodonta. The genus lived in North America (what is now Wyoming) from the early to middle Eocene.

== Etymology ==
The generic name means "next to Cheiromys" because the scientist who saw the bones mistakenly thought that the animal was a primate with hands like those of the lemurs from genus Daubentonia, whose synonym is Cheiromys.

== Taxonomy ==
Metacheiromys and its relatives, including the enigmatic Ernanodon, constitute the order Palaeanodonta, thought to be the sister taxon of pangolins.

== Description ==
Metacheiromys was a small creature, and measured around 45 centimetres (18 in) long. Metacheiromys marshi had a frontal diploic vein foramen relatively ventrally positioned in the orbit. Unlike pangolins, it possessed a superior olfactory sinus, an occipital emissary vein, a condyloid canal, and separate foramina for the exit of the internal jugular vein and for the glossopharyngeal, vagus, and accessory nerves. The genus had long claws and a narrow head similar in shape to that of an armadillo or an anteater (though it was actually related to the modern pangolins).

== Palaeobiology ==
=== Diet ===
The presence of an orbital gyrus in Metacheiromys suggests it was myrmecophagous and had a protrusile tongue. The shape of its claws suggests that it probably dug through the soil in search of food, most likely small invertebrates. Unlike modern anteaters or pangolins, it had powerful canine teeth, but only a very few cheek teeth, instead using horny pads in its mouth to crush its food.

=== Locomotion ===
The malleus of Metacheiromys had a disproportionately large mallear head, an adaptation for detection of seismic vibrations of very low frequencies. This, together with its enlarged tympanic cavity, strongly suggests that Metacheiromys was a fossorial animal. The small size of the petrosal lobules, which control eye movements during locomotion, in Metacheiromys indicates that it was a slow-moving animal.

== See also ==
- Mammal classification
- Metacheiromyinae
