= Dental caries (non-human) =

Tooth decay in animals

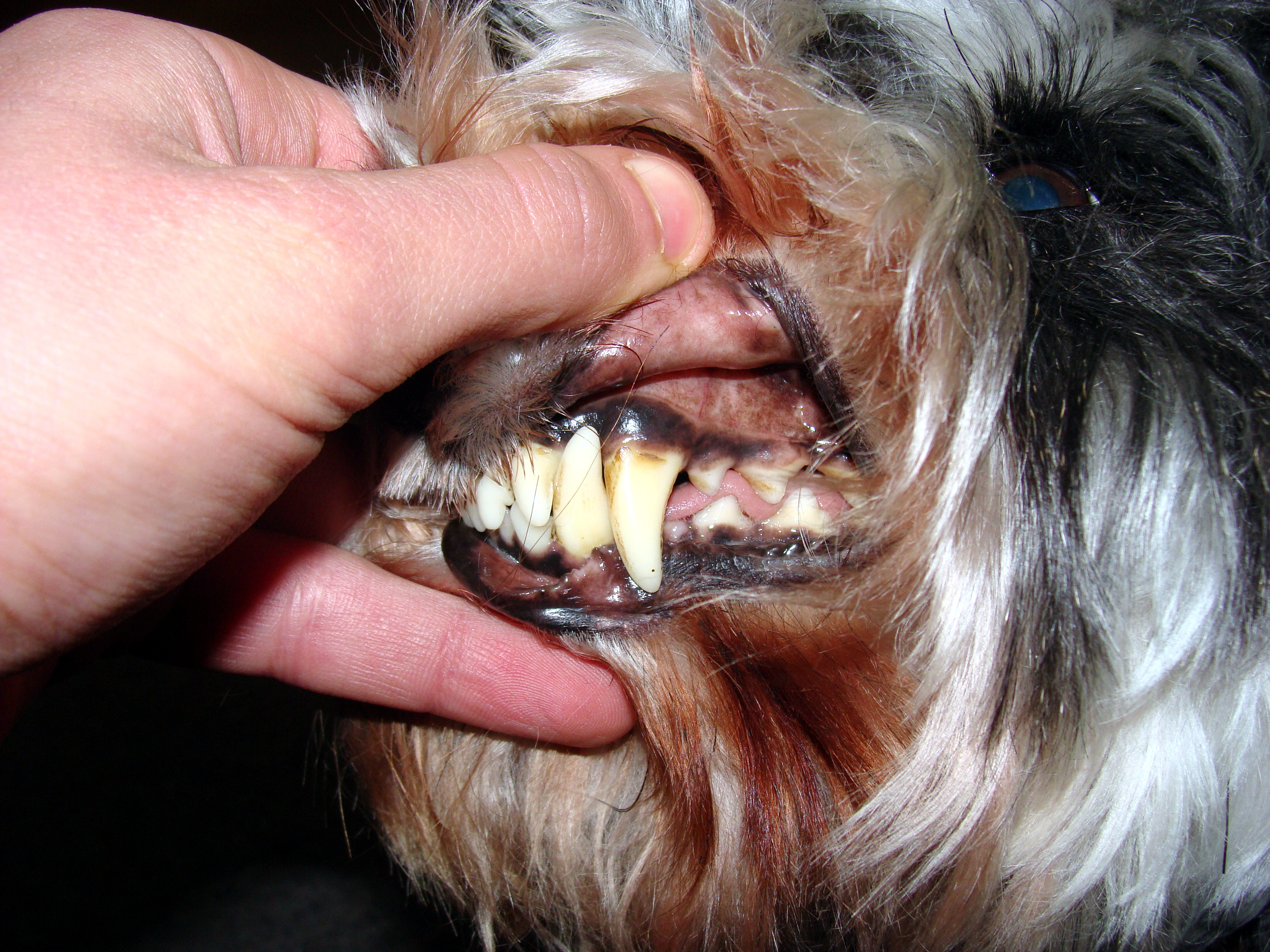
Dental caries infestation in a dog

Dental caries, also known as tooth decay, is uncommon among companion animals. The bacteria Streptococcus mutans and Streptococcus sanguis cause dental caries by metabolising sugars. Prehistoric primates eating fruit suffered from cavities.

The term feline cavities is commonly used to refer to feline odontoclastic resorptive lesions, however, saccharolytic acid-producing bacteria (the same responsible for Dental plaque) are not involved in this condition.

== In dogs ==
Although rarely seen in cats, the incidence of caries in dogs has been estimated at 5%. Dogs are less likely than humans to have tooth decay due to the very high pH of dog saliva, which prevents an acidic environment from forming and the subsequent demineralization of enamel which would occur.

== Symptoms ==
Dental caries in dogs are often recognized very late but there are some symptoms that could indicate tooth decay. Red, swollen, or receding gums and bloody saliva could be symptoms of dental caries. Other signs of decay are similar to humans. This includes a discolouration of teeth, an accumulation of calculus and halitosis. One-sided chewing, increased scratching of the face and avoidance of solid food could also be signs of dental caries.

== Reasons for dental caries ==
A main reason for dental caries in dogs is unfavourable shape or positioning of the teeth, as well as the intake of foods which contain sugar.

It has been shown that some dogs are more susceptible to dental caries than others. Thus, it is likely dogs with caries are prone to additional tooth decay.

== Formation of dental caries ==
The formation of dental caries in dogs can be divided into two stages:

The demineralisation of the inorganic part of the tooth is described as the first stage. Even though the jaw of the carnivore is a scissor-like shape that helps reduce food residue, dental caries are mainly caused by leftover sugar-containing food in small notches of the teeth or interdental space. In the long run, this can cause dissolution of the inorganic substance of the teeth. Within this process the dentin is the most susceptible and vulnerable part of the teeth which suffers the most damage. In severe cases the bacteria infest the enamel, which then need to be removed. The enamel layer in canine teeth is thinner than in humans (2–3 mm) at less than 0.6 mm.

In the second phase, the dentin gets dissolved which causes a cavity in the enamel. Most cases of dental caries in dogs only get recognized in later stages because the decay is not obvious from the outside.

== Treatment options ==
If a tooth is infected by dental caries there are two main treatment options. Teeth with dental caries get extracted in most veterinary clinics. A second option is specialized vets that can save teeth from an extraction. If there remains enough enamel the tooth can be repaired. In the case of decay to the tooth pulp, a root canal treatment is needed.
