= Microsyops =

Microsyops Temporal range: Early-Mid Eocene (Wasatchian-Uintan) ~50.3–40.4 Ma

Scientific classification
- Kingdom: Animalia
- Phylum: Chordata
- Class: Mammalia
- Order: †Plesiadapiformes
- Family: †Microsyopidae
- Subfamily: †Microsyopinae
- Genus: †Microsyops; Leidy, 1872

Species
- M. elegans; M. annectens; M. latidens

Extinct genus of primates

Microsyops is a plesiadapiform found in the Middle Eocene in North America. It is in the family Microsyopidae, a plesiadapiform family characterized by distinctive lanceolate lower first incisors. It appears to have had a more developed sense of smell than other early primates. It is believed to have eaten fruit, and its fossils show the oldest known dental cavities in a mammal.

There are nine species of Microsyops that exist in the fossil record from the middle Wasatchian (~53 million years ago) through Uintan (~42 million years ago) North American Land Mammal Ages. Microsyops is primarily known from the Rocky Mountain region of the United States, though fossils have also been found in California and Texas.

== Morphology ==
=== Dental morphology ===
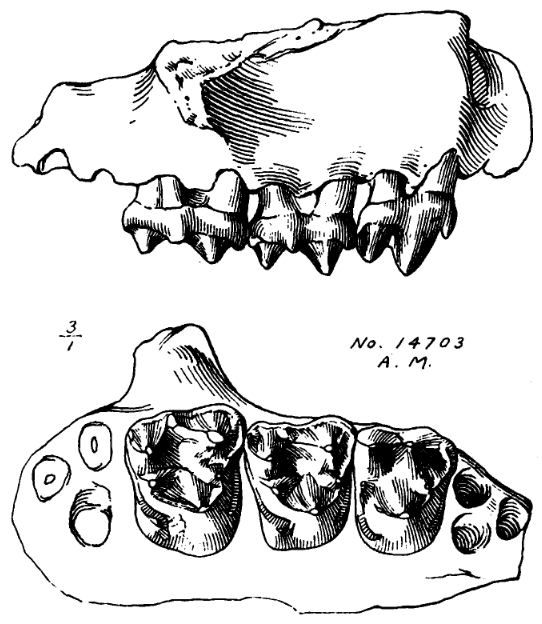
Upper dentition of Microsyops scottianus

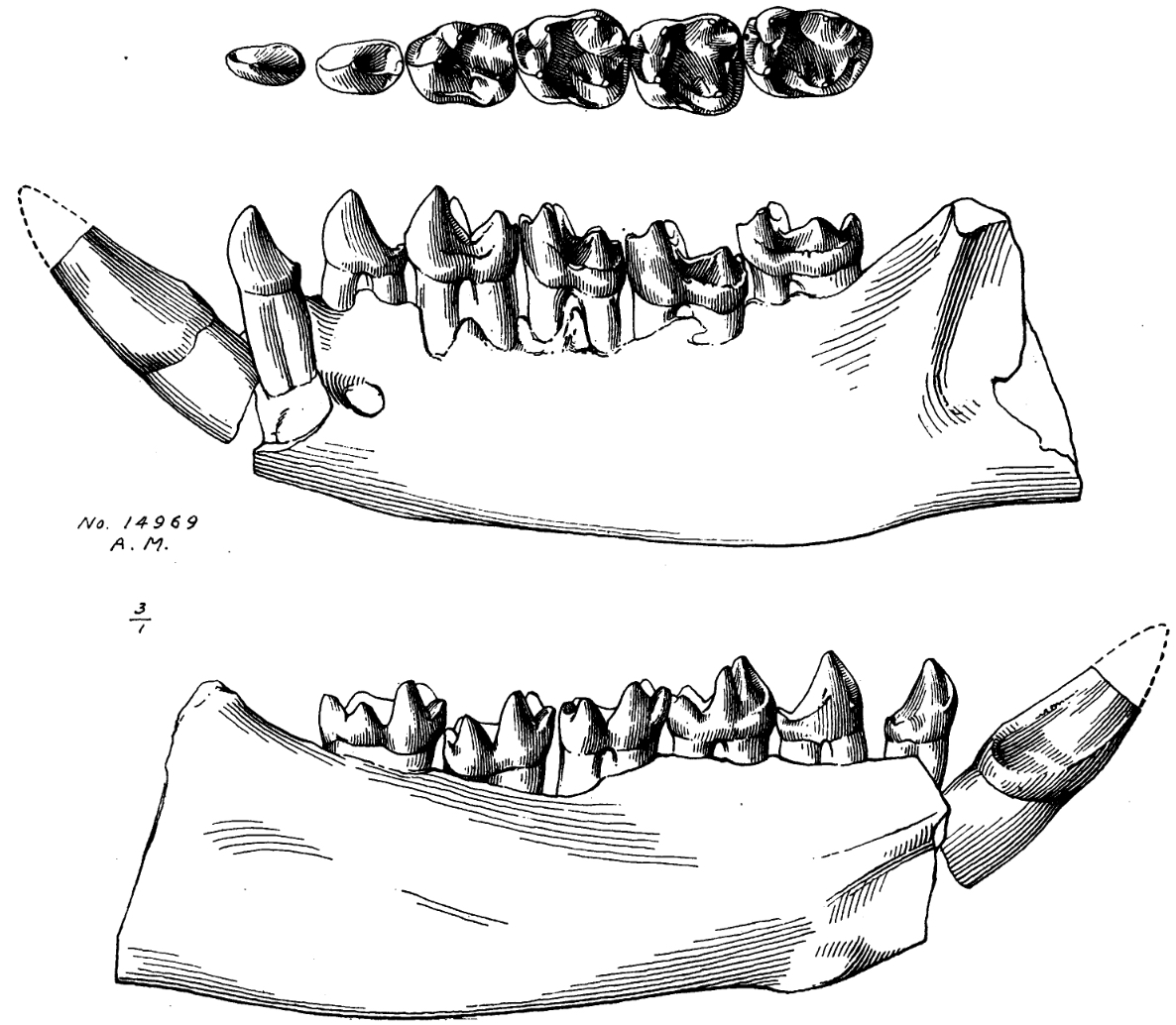
Lower dentition of Microsyops scottianus

Consistent with other North American members of Microsyopidae, Microsyops has a lower central incisor that is enlarged, procumbent, and lanceolate. The expansive flattened surface of the lower central incisor is oriented towards the front of the tooth. Microsyops has a lower dental formula of 1-0-3-3, with one incisor, no canine, three premolars, and three molars. The lower second premolar is single-rooted, and the third premolar is premolariform. The fourth lower premolar has a distinct metaconid, no paraconid, and a two-cusped talonid with a more fully-developed basin than in the closely related Arctodontomys. Lower molars each have a small yet distinct paraconid, a semi-compressed trigonid, a developed mesoconid, and a small, twinned hypoconulid.

The upper canine of Microsyops is double-rooted. The upper fourth premolar has a distinct metacone and a weak parastyle. Upper molars exhibit clear conules, in particular a distinct metaconule, unlike the condition in the closely related Craseops. Additionally, Microsyops upper molars lack a postprotocingulum, in contrast to the condition found in most early Paleogene primates.

=== Cranial and postcranial morphology ===
The basicranium of Microsyops has been described in detail in order to determine its affinities with respect to other mammals. Based on basicranial features, the internal carotid artery which supplied blood to the brain of Microsyops was primitive with respect to both extinct and extant euarchontans. These features include a transpromontorial groove indicating an unreduced internal carotid artery and grooves marking the course for both stapedial and promontorial branches of the internal carotid artery (Silcox et al. 2020). Another characteristic that suggests Microsyops was primitive is the presence of unexpanded caudal and rostral tympanic petrosal processes. Unlike other plesiadapiforms, Microsyops lacked a bony auditory bulla (Gunnel 1989, Silcox et al. 2020). Additionally, Microsyops lacks the specialized cranial morphology considered characteristic of crown scandentians and dermopterans.

The most characteristic aspect of the cranial morphology of Microsyops is the presence of a postorbital process. This trait is unlike the condition found in early Paleogene primates, which possess a full postorbital bar. However, Microsyops also differs from other plesiadapiforms, which lack either a postorbital bar or process. The postorbital process of Microsyops has been described as being superficially similar to that of dermopterans.

Due to limited available material, very little is known about the postcranial morphology of Microsyops, and Microsyopidae in general.

== Taxonomy ==
Microsyops was first described by Joseph Leidy in 1872. He compared lower jaw fragments, found by Dr. J. V. Carter in the Bridger Basin of southwestern Wyoming, to the condylarth Hyopsodus gracilis, named by Professor O. C. Marsh of Yale University. At the time he believed the fragments to represent the same animal and proposed the new binomial combination of Microsyops gracilis. Leidy later compared his M. gracilis to Marsh's Limnotherium elegans, which was originally described as a diminutive mammal and later as a primate. He concluded they were the same but with L. elegans as a species of the genus Microsyops, and that his original Microsyops gracilis should be properly named Microsyops elegans.

Microsyopinae and Uintasoricinae are subfamilies within the plesiadapiform family Microsyopidae. Microsyops is a genus of the subfamily Microsyopinae which also includes the genera Arctodontomys, Megadelphus and Craseops. This subfamily includes the larger microsyopids. The subfamily Uintasoricinae includes the diminutive taxa Niptomomys, Uintasorex, and Choctawius. Microsyopidae is one of the longest-lived groups of plesiadapiforms, lasting 20 million years in North America from the late Paleocene to late Eocene (Silcox et al. 2021). Two families of plesiadapiforms, Microsyopidae and Paromomyidae, have representative taxa from the Uintan Land-Mammal Age (middle Eocene) while the Plesiadapidae and Carpolestidae disappeared at the end of the Paleocene.

Recognized species of Microsyops includes M. elegans, M. annectens, M. scottianus, M. augustidens, M. kratos, M. latidens, M. cardiorestes, M. vicarius, and M. knightensis, with M. elegans being the type species.

Some authors argue that microsyopids are plesiadapiforms while others suggest a dermopteran grouping. However, the overall relationship between plesiadiforms and other living and fossil members of Euarchontoglires has been disputed. In a cladistic analysis including postcranial, cranial, and dental characteristics by Bloch et al. (2007), microsyopids were found to be plesiadapiforms more distantly related to euprimates than plesiadapoids or paromomyoids, and without any special relationship to dermopterans. However, while analyses support a euarchontan grouping, specific relationships of microsyopids to other plesiadapiforms, euprimates, scandentia, and dermoptera remain unresolved. Microsyopids are generally thought to be euarchontans, and some researchers consider them to be stem primates.

== Palaeobiology ==
=== Palaeoecology ===
Dental topographic analysis is suggestive of Microsyops angustidens being insectivorous. Its dietary pattern remained stable over geologic time, in contrast to that of the closely related Arctodontomys wilsoni and Arctodontomys nuptus.

==== Diet and body size ====
Body size diversity of Microsyops spans from the 700-gram Microsyops cardiorestes to over 3000 grams for Microsyops kratos, estimated using the dimensions of the upper and lower last premolar and first molar. The diet of Microsyops is varied among the nine species, with the smaller-bodied and more primitive species, like M. cardiorestes, likely able to exist by eating almost exclusively insects. However, larger-bodied species, such as Microsyops annectens or M. kratos, likely needed to expand their diets to include other food sources. This is also supported by wear facets on the molars of M. annectens and M. kratos that are indicative of heavier shearing and crushing forces required of harder foods like fruits and nuts. Another indication of expanded diets, away from strict insectivory, comes in the form of reported cavities in a sample of Microsyops latidens where a sample of 1030 individuals included 77 specimens showing signs of cavities. In this case, cavities are likely caused by a reliance on more sugary foods, such as fruits, moving away from strict insectivory.

== Paleoenvironment ==
Microsyopidae lived from the late Paleocene to the middle Eocene in North America. Conditions of the Eocene supported extensive subtropical woodland and rainforest environments which facilitate arboreal lifestyles. This time is also characterized by the Paleocene-Eocene Thermal Maximum, displaying the highest temperatures of the Cenozoic period. From this peak, steady temperature declines are displayed throughout the middle to late Eocene.

== Notable fossils ==
A well-preserved skull of Microsyops annectens from Carter Mountain in northwestern Wyoming has been used to generate a virtual endocast via micro-CT. Cranial capacity has been estimated as 5.9 cm^{3}, yielding an encephalization quotient (EQ) of 0.26-0.52 depending on different body mass estimates and the choice of equation used to estimate EQ. Microsyops has larger EQ than Plesiadapis cookei, and falls in the lower range of estimates for early Paleogene primates. However, basicranial anatomy is remarkably primitive, because the auditory bulla was not ossified and there are only grooves, rather than bony tubes, for the intrabullar parts of the internal carotid artery and its dependencies. The basicranial anatomy of Microsyops appears to be little changed from that of primitive placental mammals.
