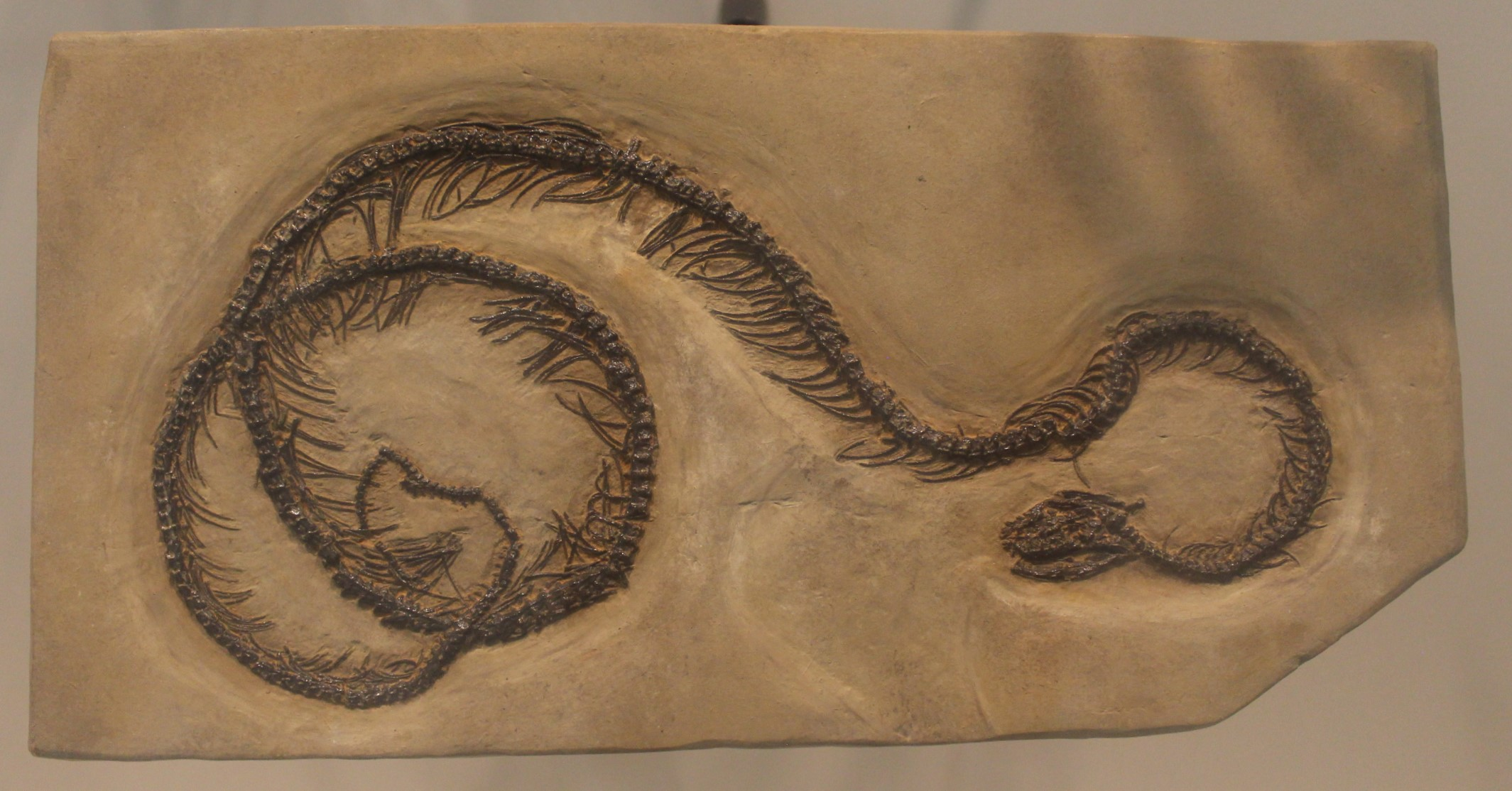
- Cast of B. idelmani holotype (AMNH 3850), American Museum of Natural History

Scientific classification
- Kingdom: Animalia
- Phylum: Chordata
- Class: Reptilia
- Order: Squamata
- Suborder: Serpentes
- Family: Boidae
- Genus: †Boavus; Marsh, 1871

Type species
- Boavus occidentalis Marsh, 1871

Species
- ?B. agilis Marsh, 1871; B. brevis Marsh, 1871; B. occidentalis Marsh, 1871; B. idelmani Gilmore, 1938; B. affinis Brattstrom, 1955

= Boavus =

Boavus Temporal range: Eocene - ?Miocene

Extinct genus of snakes

Boavus is an extinct genus of boa known primarily from Eocene-aged strata of North America. At least three species (B. occidentalis, B. idelmani, and possibly B. agilis) are known from the Middle Eocene Green River lagerstätte in Wyoming, two species from Eocene strata of Uinta County (B. occidentalis again, B. brevis), and at least one species is known from the middle to late Eocene-aged Sespe Formation of California (B. affinis). Boavus was a small snake measuring between 1 and 2 metres (3.3 and 6.6 ft) long.

== Post-Eocene specimens ==
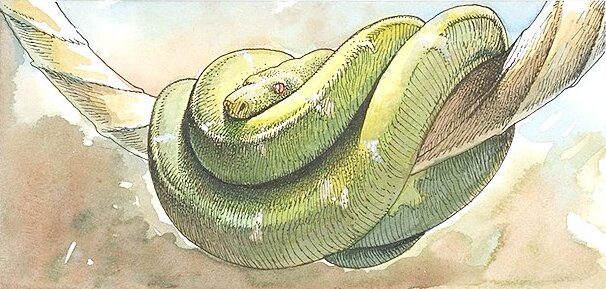
Life restoration

Three vertebrae very similar in form, if not identical to those of B. occidentalis were found in early Oligocene-aged strata of South Dakota. Remains of what may be B. affinis are found in Late Miocene (Early Barstovian-aged) strata of Trinity River in Texas.
