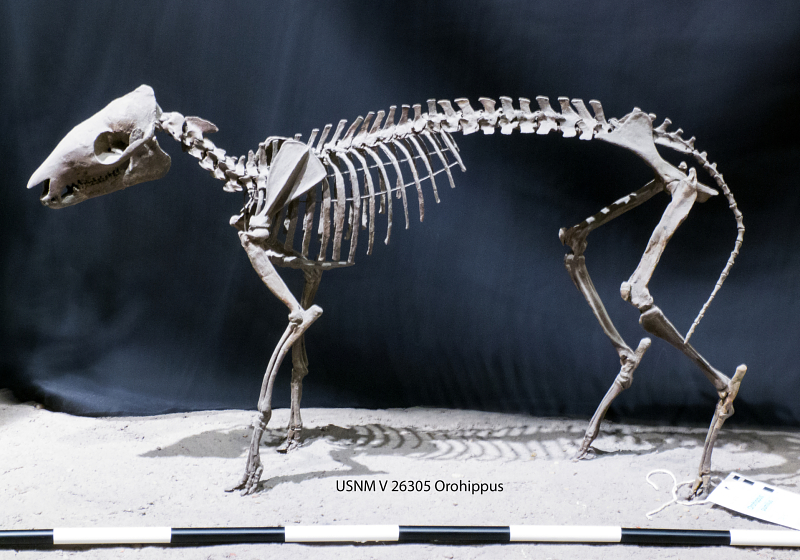
- Skeleton of Orohippus pumillus at the Smithsonian Museum of Natural History.

Scientific classification
- Kingdom: Animalia
- Phylum: Chordata
- Class: Mammalia
- Order: Perissodactyla
- Family: Equidae
- Genus: †Orohippus; Marsh, 1872

Type species
- †Orohippus pumillus

Species
- †O. agilis; †O. major; †O. progressus; †O. proteros; †O. pumillus; †O. sylvaticus

= Orohippus =

Orohippus Temporal range: early to middle Eocene

Extinct genus of mammals

Orohippus (from the Greek ὄρος óros, 'mountain' and ἵππος híppos, 'horse') is an extinct equid that lived in the Eocene (about 50 million years ago). Its fossils have been unearthed in Oregon, Colorado, Utah, and Wyoming.

== Description ==
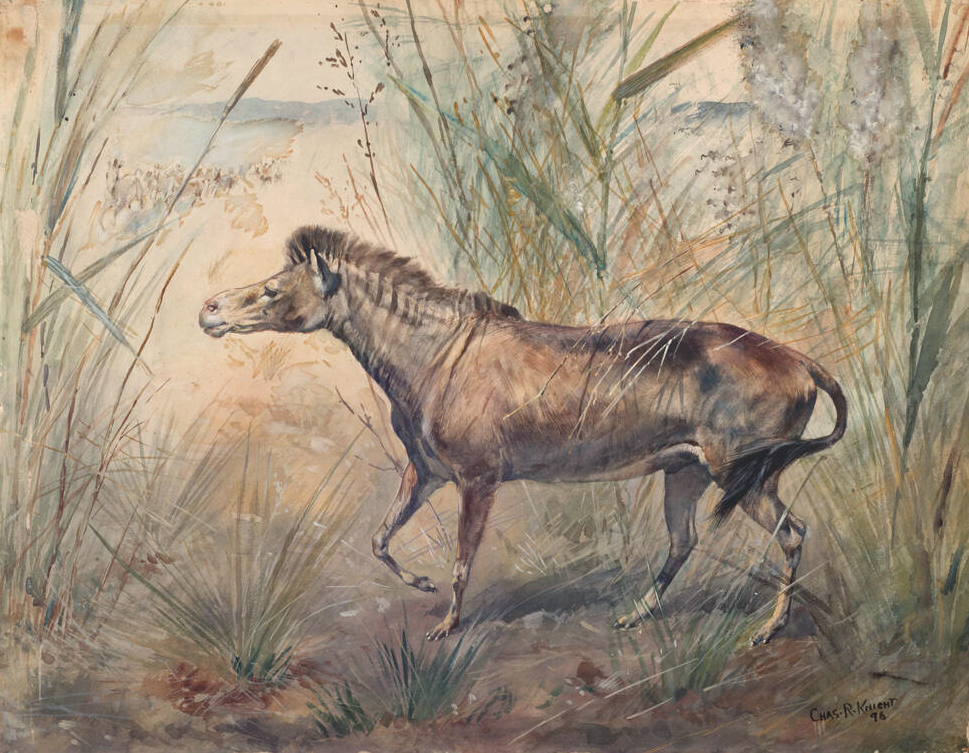
Life restoration by Charles R. Knight

It is believed to have evolved from equids such as Eohippus, as the earliest evidence for Orohippus appears about 2 million years after the first appearance of Eohippus. The anatomical differences between the two are slight: they were the same size, but Orohippus had a slimmer body, a more elongated head, slimmer forelimbs and longer hind legs, all of which are characteristics of a good jumper. Its teeth were brachydont in height, but the development of flattened surfaces and shearing lophs on their molars suggests they were more a browser than a frugivore. The outer toes of Eohippus are no longer present in Orohippus, hence on each forelimb there were four fingers (toes) and on each hind leg three toes.

Species of Orohippus have also been referred to Protorohippus.

== See also ==
- Evolution of the horse
- Horse
