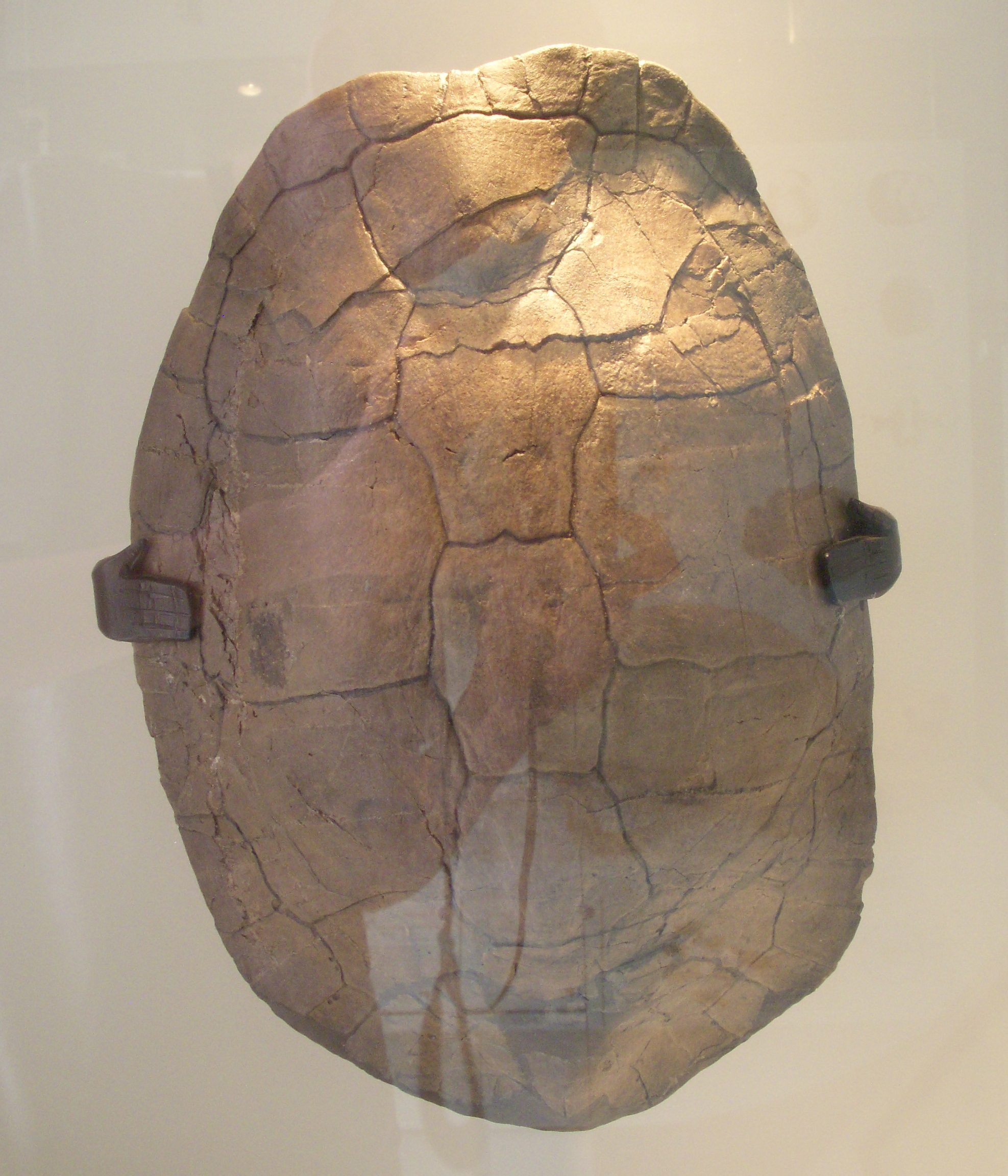
- Shell of Echmatemys stevensoniana (AMNH 6084) in the American Museum of Natural History

Scientific classification
- Kingdom: Animalia
- Phylum: Chordata
- Class: Reptilia
- Order: Testudines
- Suborder: Cryptodira
- Family: Geoemydidae
- Genus: †Echmatemys; Hay, 1906

Species
- †E. septaria (Cope, 1873); †E. stevensoniana; †E. wyomingensis

= Echmatemys =

Echmatemys Temporal range: Eocene, 55 Ma

Extinct genus of turtles

Echmatemys is an extinct genus of geoemydid turtle from the Eocene of North America. It is the oldest North American geoemydids, and is one of the most common early Eocene turtles.
