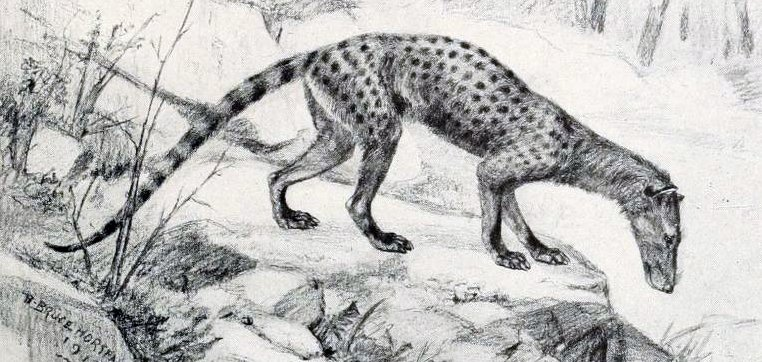
- Restoration of Tritemnodon agilis
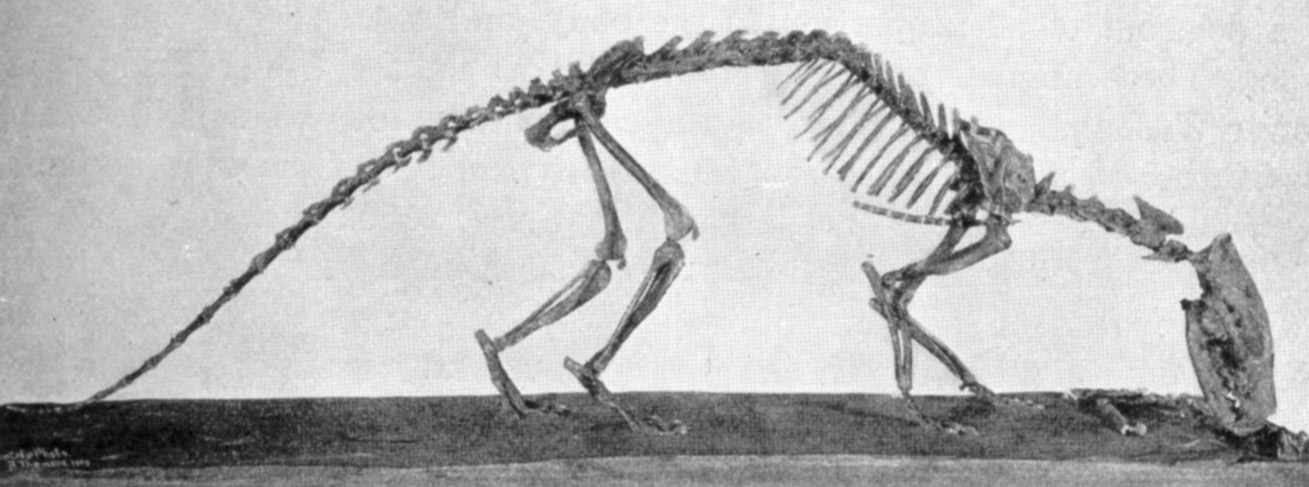
- Tritemnodon agilis skeleton

Scientific classification
- Kingdom: Animalia
- Phylum: Chordata
- Class: Mammalia
- Order: †Hyaenodonta
- Genus: †Tritemnodon; Matthew, 1906

Type species
- †Tritemnodon agilis Marsh, 1872

Species
- †T. agilis (Marsh, 1872); †T. sp. [FMNH PM 55839] (Tomiya, 2021)

Synonyms
- synonyms of species: T. agilis: Limnocyon agilis (Marsh, 1872); Sinopa agilis (Matthew, 1901); Sinopa brevicalcaratus (Cope, 1872); Sinopa gracilis (Wortman, 1902); Stypolophus agilis; Stypolophus brevicolcarabus (Cope, 1872); Stypolophus brevicalcaratus (Cope, 1872)

= Tritemnodon =

Tritemnodon Temporal range: 50.3–46.2 Ma Early Eocene

Genus of extinct placental mammals

Tritemnodon ("three cutting teeth") was an extinct genus of placental mammals from extinct order Hyaenodonta, that lived in North America during the early Eocene. Fossils of Tritemnodon agilis have been found in Utah and Wyoming (Willwood Formation of Big Horn County and the Lower Bridger Formation of Uinta County). It was the size of a wolf.
