= Apatemys =

Apatemys Temporal range: Eocene

Scientific classification
- Kingdom: Animalia
- Phylum: Chordata
- Class: Mammalia
- Order: †Apatotheria
- Family: †Apatemyidae
- Genus: †Apatemys; Marsh, 1872

Species
- Apatemys bellulus (Marsh, 1872); Apatemys bellus (Marsh, 1872); Apatemys chardini (Jepsen, 1930); Apatemys downsi (Gazin, 1958); Apatemys hendryi (Robinson, 1966); Apatemys mutiniacus (Russell et al., 1979); Apatemys prouti (Hooker, 2010); Apatemys pygmaeus (Beard and Dawson, 2009); Apatemys rodens (Troxell, 1923); Apatemys sigogneaui (Russell et al., 1979); Apatemys teilhardi (Russell et al. 1979); Apatemys uintensis (Matthew, 1921)

Extinct genus of mammals

Apatemys is a member of the family Apatemyidae, an extinct group of small and insectivorous placental mammals that lived in the Paleogene of North America, India, and Europe. While the number of genera and species is less agreed upon, it has been determined that two apatemyid genera, Apatemys and Sinclairella, existed sequentially during the Eocene in North America. The genus Apatemys, living as far back as 50.3 million years ago (mya), existed through part of the Wasatchian and persisted through the Duchesnean, and Sinclairella followed, existing from the Duchesnean through the Arikareean. Examinations of specimens belonging to the genus Apatemys suggest adaptations characteristic of arboreal mammals.

== Etymology ==
The genus name Apatemys likely derives from the Greek apate meaning “deceit” and mys meaning “mouse”. In Greek mythology, Apate represented deceit and was one of the evil spirits released from Pandora's box. While the Greek word “mys” is used in reference to the mouse-like size of apatemyids, the relationship between the Greek word “apate” and the genus Apatemys is unknown.

== Taxonomy ==
The family Apatemyidae has no sister taxa and has faced much disagreement regarding its origins and affinities. Apatemyids are scarce even in the faunas where they are most often discovered, and constructing a valid taxonomy is challenging since the specimens are typically retrieved in small sample sizes. Early hypotheses for apatemyid affinities include relations to ungulates and rodents, but the most popular early suggestions were classifying them with Insectivora or assigning them to their own order of Apatotheria. It was later proposed that apatemyids belong to the order Cimolesta, which deemed apatemyids more closely related to carnivores than to rodents. However, the relationships of the Apatemyidae continue to be speculated, with connections to other groups like primates being proposed. More valid taxonomic information is known about the genus Apatemys and the species belonging to the genus. Apatemys has 14 sister taxa also belonging to the family Apatemyidae, including Apatemyinae, Asiapator, Carcinella, Eochiromys, Frugivastodon, Heterohyus, Jepsenella, Labidolemur, Russellmyinae, Russellmys, Sinclairella, Stehlinella, Teilhardella, Unuchinia, and Unuchiniinae. There are 13 known species belonging to the genus Apatemys. The type species for the genus is Apatemys bellus, which was named by Marsh (1872), from a type specimen (YPM 13512) consisting of a mandible. The species of the genus Apatemys belong to the suborder Apatotheria, whose sister taxa are Didelphodonta, Cimolestidae, Palaeoryctida, Pantodonta, Pantolesta, Pentacodontidae, Sarcodontidae and Todralestidae.

== Description ==
Apatemyids are highly specialized eutherian mammals prevalent throughout Tertiary deposits of North America, Europe, India and Mongolia. A skeleton of Apatemys chardini that was found in southwestern Wyoming measured 36 cm (14 in), with its tail being nearly two-thirds of its total length. With a body-and-head length of 15 cm (5.9 in), it is comparable to the extant striped possum (Dactylopsila trivirgata), at 12 cm (4.7 in). The skeleton of apatemyids was rather slim, and their skull was large in comparison.

Other information on skull morphology has been limited due to the skulls of the few complete apatemyid fossils being crushed. Significant postcranial adaptations include elongated second and third digits and a long, gracile tail. Apatemyids are also characterized by various dental features including a large and procumbent first lower incisor, a vertically oriented first upper incisor, an elongated and blade-like second lower premolar, small and narrow upper and lower cheek teeth, and the presence of an additional antero-buccal cusp and a reduced paraconid on the lower molars.

== Ecology ==
Apatemyids were arboreal, tree-living mammals, occupying a niche filled by the modern-day aye-aye and woodpecker. Both the woodpecker and aye-aye are capable of penetrating wood to reach invertebrates, but the aye-aye does so by poking holes in the wood using its elongated incisors and then extracting the insects using its slender third digit. The highly specialized hands and teeth of apatemyids suggest they were able to pick the larvae of wood-boring insects out of trees in a similar manner. The elongated digits II and III allowed apatemyids to reach within the tiny crevices of tree bark and extract the larvae to feed on. Other behaviors of apatemyids resembled those of the modern-day squirrel or lemur. With narrow and long clawed toes, apatemyids were adapted for grasping trees, which is consistent with being arboreal mammals.
