= Willwood Formation =

Geologic formation in Wyoming, United States

- Stratigraphic range: Thanetian-Ypresian (Clarkforkian-Bridgerian); ~56–48 Ma
- Type: Geological formation
- Sub-units: Gray Bull beds, Sand Coulee beds, Sand Creek Facies, Wa-1 Zone

Lithology
- Primary: Mudstone, shale
- Other: Sandstone, conglomerate

Location
- Coordinates: 44.5°N 108.0°W
- Approximate paleocoordinates: 49.2°N 90.8°W
- Region: Wyoming
- Country: United States
- Extent: Bighorn Basin

Type section
- Named for: Shale, mudstone, limestone
- Willwood Formation (the United States) Willwood Formation (Wyoming)

The Willwood Formation is a sedimentary sequence deposited during the late Paleocene to early Eocene, or Clarkforkian, Wasatchian and Bridgerian in the NALMA classification.

== Description ==
It consists of fine grained clastic rocks (mudstone and shale) interbedded with medium grained clastic rocks (sandstone) and sporadic conglomerates. The formation underlies portions of the Bighorn Basin of Big Horn, Hot Springs, Park and Washakie counties of Wyoming.

=== Dating ===
Radiometric dating of volcanic tuffs, combined with comparisons with other formations using magnetostratigraphy, using numerous samples from various levels of the formation suggest an age range of 55 – 52 million years ago, placing the Paleocene-Eocene boundary near the base of the formation.

== Fossil content ==
Trace fossils have been found in the Willwood Formation. Fossil birds include Gastornis, Neocathartes and Paracathartes. A fossil alligatorid, namely Orthogenysuchus, was also found in this formation.

=== Mammals ===
==== Afrotheres ====
Afrotheres reported from the Willwood Formation
Genus	Species	Presence	Material	Notes	Images
Apheliscus	A. sp.	Upper Gray Bull.		A macroscelidean.	

==== Apatotheres ====
Apatotheres reported from the Willwood Formation
Genus	Species	Presence	Material	Notes	Images
Apatemys	A. bellulus	Lysite and Lost Cabin Zone.		Also found in the Wind River Formation.	
Apatemys	A. chardini	Middle and possibly lower Gray Bull zone.		The smallest species of the genus.	
Apatemys	A. kayi			The oldest known species of the genus.	
Apatemys	A. sp., cf. A. rodens	Eastern side of Red Butte, and north of Sheep Mountain.	YPM 23476, 30582, AMNH 48999.	3 very large specimens of Apatemys.	

==== Bats ====
Bats reported from the Willwood Formation
Genus	Species	Presence	Material	Notes	Images
cf. Icaronycteris	cf. I. sp.	Locality SC-29, Park County, Wyoming.	3 fragmentary specimens.		

==== Cimolestans ====
Cimolestans reported from the Willwood Formation
Genus	Species	Presence	Material	Notes	Images
Azgonyx	A. gunnelli	Localities SC-67, SC-308 and SC-351.		A tillodont.	
Azgonyx	A. sp.	Locality SC-67.		A larger tillodont than A. gunnelli.	
Coryphodon	C. sp.	Localities FG-61, SC-67 and SC-139.		A pantodont.	
Didelphodus	D. absarokae	Lower Gray Bull to the upper part of the Lysite zones.		A palaeoryctid.	
Ectoganus	E. bighornensis	Localities HG-3 and SC-67.		A taeniodont.	
Ectoganus	E. copei		USGS 3838, with postcrania.	A taeniodont.	
Ectoganus	E. gliriformis		A fragmentary femur (PU 13173).	A taeniodont.	
Esthonyx	E. bisculatus		Jaws, teeth and a few postcranial remains.	A tillodont.	
Esthonyx	E. spatularius	Bighorn Basin, and locality SC-67.	Fragmentary left dentary.	A tillodont.	
Megalesthonyx	M. hopsoni	Buffalo Basin.		A tillodont.	
cf. Palaeoryctes	cf. P. sp.		"USGSD 1661, 2151, 3711".	A palaeoryctid.	
Palaeosinopa	P. incerta	Lower to upper Gray Bull zone,Bighorn Basin.		A pantolestid also found in the Wind River and San Jose formations.	
Palaeosinopa	P. lutreola	Middle and upper Gray Bull zone, Bighorn Basin.		A pantolestid.	
Palaeosinopa	P. veterrima	Lower Gray Bull through Lysite zones, Bighorn Basin.	More than 50 specimens.	A pantolestid.	
Palaeosinopa	P. sp.	Lower part of the formation.	UM 69722 (a partial skull and mandible).	A pantolestid.	
cf. Pararyctes	cf. P. sp.	"Yale locality 363 at the 190-m level of the Willwood Formation in the Elk Creek Facies".	UW 7028.	A palaeoryctid.	

==== Eulipotyphlans ====
Eulipotyphlans reported from the Willwood Formation
Genus	Species	Presence	Material	Notes	Images
Auroralestes	A. simpsoni	Lower part of the formation, Sand Creek Facies.	UW 9616 (right P4-M2) and YPM 35156.	An erinaceid, originally named Eolestes.	
Batodonoides	B. vanhouteni	Locality SC-303, situated at the 2,110 m level of the formation.	Maxilla and dentaries.	A geolabidid.	
Centetodon	C. neashami	"Lower middle Gray Bull and upper Gray Bull zones".		A geolabidid.	
Centetodon	C. patratus		UCMP 44954 and YPM 23088, possibly also UCMP 44957, 44958, 44959.	A geolabidid.	
Creotarsus	C. lepidus	"Lower Gray Bull beds, Coon Creek, Garland Road, Bighorn Basin".	"AMNH 16169, left ramus with P4-M2, and associated tarsal bones".	An animal of enigmatic affinities but may be an erinaceomorph.	
cf. Dartonius	cf. D. jepseni		"YPM 30559, fragment of left ramus with P4-M1 and trigonid of M2".	An erinaceid, originally referred to as "Leptacodon" jepseni.	
Dormaaliidae	Dormaaliid, sp. A	Sand Creek Facies.	UW 7048, 9627.	An amphilemurid.	
Eolestes	E. simpsoni	Lower part of the formation, Sand Creek Facies.	UW 9616 (right P4-M2) and YPM 35156.	Now renamed to Auroralestes.	
Insectivora (?)	gen. et. sp. indeterminate	YPM locality 355, lower part of the middle Gray Bull zone.	"YPM 30860, fragment of right ramus with M1(?) and trigonid of M2(?)".	Teeth which may represent an unusual insectivore or microchiropteran.	
cf. Leipsanolestes	cf. L. sp.	Sand Creek Facies.	UW 9672, a left molar.	An erinaceid.	
Leptacodon	cf. "L." jepseni		"YPM 30559, fragment of left ramus with P4-M1 and trigonid of M2".	Actually an erinaceid, now reassigned to a new genus, Dartonius.	
Leptacodon	L. rosei	Localities SC-188 and SC-29, Park County, Wyoming.	3 dentaries, 2 maxillae, several isolated teeth and possibly a metatarsal.	A nyctitheriid.	
Leptacodon	Cf. L. sp.		A single lower molar.	A nyctitheriid.	
Limaconyssus	L. habrus	Locality SC-29, Park County, Wyoming.	Left dentary.	A nyctitheriid.	
Macrocranion	M. nitens	Uppermost part of the lower Gray Bull zone to the upper part of the Lysite zone.		An amphilemurid.	
Parapternodus	P. antiquus	Lower part of the formation.	YPM 31169, fragment of left ramus with M2-3.	An apternodontid.	
Plagioctenodon	P. krausae	Sand Creek Facies.		A nyctitheriid.	
Plagioctenodon	cf. P. krausae	Locality SC-29, Park County, Wyoming.	An isolated first or second lower incisor and the buccal half of an upper molar.	A nyctitheriid.	
Plagioctenodon	P. savagei	YPM locality 104, lower part of the formation.	"YPM 34257, right P3-M2".	A nyctitheriid.	
Pontifactor	P. sp.		"UW 8584, 9621, 9649, 9681, 9683, 9710, 9721, 9732, 9733, 10449, 10455, 10456".	A nyctitheriid.	
Scenopagus	S. hewettensis	UW locality V -73020.	UW 8998 and possibly UW 9738, 10450.	An amphilemurid.	
Scenopagus	S. sp.	Middle Gray Bull zone.		An amphilemurid, at least 2 species represented by inadequate material, at least one is probably new.	
Talpavoides	T. dartoni	Lower part of the formation.		An amphilemurid.	
Wyonycteris	W. chalix	Locality SC-29, Park County, Wyoming.	"UM 76910, a right dentary".	A nyctitheriid, originally believed to be a bat.	

==== Ferae ====
Ferae reported from the Willwood Formation
Genus	Species	Presence	Material	Notes	Images
Acarictis	A. ryani	Locality SC-67.	A broken right molar and a left molar.	A hyaenodont.	
Alocodontulum	A. atopum		YRM 30790 and USGS 7208.	A palaeanodont.	
Arfia	A. junnei	Localities SC-67, SC-69, SC-79, SC-121, SC-308 and SC-348.		A hyaenodont.	
Arfia	A. sp.	Southern Bighorn Basin.	Fragmentary postcranial remains.	A hyaenodont.	
Cf. Asiabradypus	Cf. A. sp.	Locality SC-67.	An edentulous right lower jaw (UM 87859m).	A palaeanodont.	
Didymictis	D. leptomylus	Localities MP-40, SC-67 and SC-79.	Skull and teeth.	A viverravid.	
Didymictis	D. protenus		Multiple postcranial specimens.	A viverravid.	
Dipsalidictis	D. platypus	Localities SC-67 and SC-141.		An oxyaenid.	
Dipsalidictis	D. transiens	Localities SC-79 and SC-67.	An upper left canine and a trigonid of a molar.	An oxyaenid.	
Miacis	M. winkleri	Localities SC-67, SC-348 and SC-350.	3 fragmentary dentaries.	A miacid.	
Miacis	cf. M. sp.		USGS 7161.	A miacid.	
Oxyaena	O. forcipata		Relatively complete skeletal remains.	An oxyaenid.	
Oxyaena	O. gulo		USGS 7186.	An oxyaenid.	
Oxyaena	O. intermedia		Fragmentary postcrania.	An oxyaenid.	
Oxyaena	O. platypus			Now moved to the genus Dipsalidictis.	
Palaeanodon	P. ignavus		Partial skeletons including postcrania.	A palaeanodont.	
Palaeanodon	P. nievelti	Localities SC-67 and SC-121.		A palaeanodont.	
Palaeonictis	P. occidentalis		"Hind foot skeleton and associated fragments".	An oxyaenid.	
Palaeonictis	P. wingi.	Locality SC-67.	Trigonid of a right molar and a partial mandible possessing multiple teeth (Chester et al., 2010).	An oxyaenid.	
Prolimnocyon	P. atavus	Bighorn Basin.	Partial skeleton.	A hyaenodont.	
Prolimnocyon	P. eerius	Localities SC-67 and possibly SC-139.	Crushed skull.	A hyaenodont.	
Prototomus	P. deimos	Localities SC-67 and SC-349.	4 fragmentary specimens.	A hyaenodont.	
Prototomus	P. sp.		4 specimens.	A hyaenodont.	
Tritemnodon	T. sp.		2 specimens with postcrania.	A hyaenodont.	
?Uintacyon	?U. sp.			A miacid.	
Viverravus	V. bowni	Locality SC-67, and locality SC-29, Park County, Wyoming.		A viverravid.	
Viverravus	V. politus	Locality SC-67.	A left maxilla.	A viverravid.	
Vulpavus	cf. V. canavus		3 specimens.	A miacid.	

==== Leptictids ====
Leptictids reported from the Willwood Formation
Genus	Species	Presence	Material	Notes	Images
Palaeictops	P. bicuspis			Also found in the Wind River Formation.	
Prodiacodon	P. tauricinerei	Mostly in the Gray Bull zone, one or two specimens in the Bighorn Basin Lysite zone.			
Prodiacodon	P. sp.	Middle Gray Bull zone.	YPM 26013, 26040, possibly 26026.		

==== Marsupials ====
Marsupials reported from the Willwood Formation
Genus	Species	Presence	Material	Notes	Images
Mimoperadectes	M. labrus	Localities SC-67 and SC-69.	Left dentary.		
Peradectes	P. cf. P. chesteri		2 isolated teeth.		

==== Multituberculates ====
Multituberculates reported from the Willwood Formation
Genus	Species	Presence	Material	Notes	Images
Ectypodus	E. powelli	Locality SC-29, Park County, Wyoming.	10 isolated teeth from at least 2 individuals.	A neoplagiaulacid.	
Ectypodus	E. tardus	Locality SC-67.	Tooth crowns.	A neoplagiaulacid.	

==== Primatomorphs ====
Primatomorphs reported from the Willwood Formation
Genus	Species	Presence	Material	Notes	Images
Absarokius	A. abbotti			An omomyid.	
Absarokius	A. metoecus			An omomyid.	
Anemorhysis	A. pattersoni	Upper part of the formation.		An omomyid.	
Anemorhysis	A. wortmani	Upper part of the formation.		An omomyid.	
Arapahovius	A. advena	Northwest Wyoming.		An omomyid.	
Arctodontomys	A. wilsoni	Locality SC-67.	Small sample of teeth.	A microsyopid.	
Bownomomys	B. americana			An omomyid, formerly listed as a species of Teilhardina.	
Bownomomys	B. crassidens			An omomyid, formerly listed as a species of Teilhardina.	
Cantius	C. abditus		A substantially complete skull and mandible.	An adapiform.	
Cantius	C. torresi	Localities SC-67 and SC-69.		An adapiform.	
Carpolestes	C. cf. C. nigridens	Locality SC-29, Park County, Wyoming.	A right dentary.	A carpolestid.	
Chlororhysis	C. incomptus	Upper part of the formation.		An omomyid.	
Micromomys	M. willwoodensis	Clark's Fork Basin.		A micromomyid.	
Microsyops	M. latidens	Southern Bighorn Basin.	Over a thousand specimens.	A plesiadapiform.	
Cf. Niptomomys	Cf. N. sp.	Locality SC-67.	An edentulous right dentary.	A microsyopid.	
Phenacolemur	P. praecox	Localities SC-67 and SC-348.	Right and left dentaries.	A paromomyid.	
Phenacolemur	P. willwoodensis	Upper part of the formation.		A paromomyid.	
Pseudotetonius	P. ambiguus			An omomyid.	
Steinius	S. annectens	Northwest Wyoming.		An omomyid.	
Steinius	S. vespertinus		"AMNH 16835, fragment of a left ramus with M1 through M3".	An omomyid.	
Strigorhysis	S. sp., cf. S. bridgerensis			An omomyid.	
Tatmanius	T. szalayi	Northwest Wyoming.		An omomyid.	
Teilhardina	T. americana			Now moved to the genus Bownomomys.	
Teilhardina	T. brandti			An omomyid.	
Teilhardina	T. crassidens			Now moved to the genus Bownomomys.	
Teilhardina	T. tenuicula			An omomyid.	
Tetonius	T. homunculus			An omomyid.	
Tetonius	T. matthewi			An omomyid.	
Tetonius	T. sp.			An omomyid.	
Tinimomys	T. graybullensis		The lingual half of a right upper molar.	A microsyopid.	
Worlandia	cf. W. sp.	Locality SC-29, Park County, Wyoming.	2 isolated teeth.	A plagiomenid colugo.	

==== Rodents ====
Rodents reported from the Willwood Formation
Genus	Species	Presence	Material	Notes	Images
Acritoparamys	Cf. A. atavus	Locality SC-67.	A small isolated lower incisor (UM 86003m).		
Acritoparamys	A. atwateri	Localities SC-67, SC-308 and SC-351.	Several dentaries and teeth.		
Franimys	F. sp.		"ACM 10524 (a skull with the right P4 and M2-M3, edentulous mandible, and several postcranial elements)".		
Notoparamys	N. costilloi	Upper part of the formation.	18 specimens.	Also known from the Huerfano Formation. "Pseudotomus" coloradensis and Leptotomus loomisi are probably junior synonyms.	
Paramys	P. taurus	Localities SC-67, SC-139 and SC-350.	Jaw fragments and incisors.		

==== Ungulates ====
Ungulates reported from the Willwood Formation
Genus	Species	Presence	Material	Notes	Images
Anacodon	A. ursidens			An arctocyonid.	
Bunophorus	cf. B. grangeri		USGS 16470 (a very incomplete skeleton).	A dichobunid originally listed as cf. Wasatchia dorseyana.	
Cardiolophus	C. radinskyi		UM 64913.	An isectolophid.	
Copecion	C. davisi	Localities BR-2, SC-51, SC-67, SC-69, SC-79, SC-139, SC-308, SC-345, SC-348, SC-349 and SC-351.		A phenacodontid.	
Chriacus	C. badgleyi	Localities SC-67, SC-79, SC-121 and SC-342.		An arctocyonid.	
Chriacus	C. sp.		Several skeletal specimens.	An arctocyonid.	
Diacodexis	D. ilicis	Localities SC-67 and SC-308.		A dichobunid.	
Diacodexis	D. metsiacus		Several specimens, including a near-complete skeleton.	A dichobunid.	
Dissacus	D. praenuntius	Park County, Wyoming.	Teeth, jaw elements & bone fragments.	A mesonychid.	
Dissacus	D. serior	USGS locality D-1754, Bighorn Basin, Wyoming.	Left dentary fragments (USGS 27612).	A mesonychid.	
Ectocion	E. osbornianus	Locality SC-67 and SC-351.	2 fragmentary dentaries. and a single postcranial association.	A phenacodontid.	
Ectocion	E. parvus	Localities HG-3, SC-67, SC-69, SC-121, SC-139, SC-182, SC-308 and SC-351.		A phenacodontid.	
Hapalodectes	H. anthracinus	University of Wyoming locality V-73086, Wyoming.	Teeth (USGS 9628).	A mesonychian	
Hapalodectes	H. leptognathus		A fragmentary specimen (USGS 5912).	A mesonychian.	
Heptodon	cf. H. calciculus	Wind River Basin.	Remains of a subadult with postcrania.		
Homogalax	H. protapirinus	Bighorn Basin.	A skull (YPM(PU) 16168), and several other specimens.	An isectolophid.	
Homogalax	cf. H. protapirinus		At least 2 specimens.	An isectolophid.	
Hyopsodus	H. loomisi	Localities SC-67, SC-69, SC-79, SC-121, SC-308 and SC-342.		A hyopsodontid.	
Hyopsodus	H. powellianus		"AMNH 4147, right mandible fragment with M1 through M3".	A hyopsodontid.	
Hyaenodictis	H. willwoodensis	Bighorn Basin.	Originally described as a species of Dissacus. Reassigned to Hyaenodictis by Solé et al. (2023).	A mesonychid.	
Lambdotherium	L. popoagicum	Multiple localities		A brontotherid.	
Lophocion	L. grangeri	Head of the Big Sand Coulee	Right maxilla with P4-M2	A phenacodontid also known from the early Eocene of China.	
Meniscotherium	M. priscum	Locality SC-67(?)	Left dentary fragment.	A phenacodontid limited to the lowest level of the Paleocene-Eocene Thermal Maximum. Abundant and forms its own biozone: Wa-M.	
Pachyaena	P. gigantea	YPM localities 131 & 149, Wyoming.	Jaw elements & teeth.	A mesonychid.	
Pachyaena	P. gracilis	USGS locality D-1640.	Maxillary fragments (USGS 7185).	A mesonychid.	
Pachyaena	P. ossifraga	Locality SC-348.	Trigonid of a right molar.	A mesonychid.	
Pachyaena	P. sp.		Postcranial material.	A mesonychid.	
Phenacodus	P. cf. P. intermedius	Localities SC-67 and SC-141.		A phenacodontid.	
Phenacodus	P. primaevus		Near complete skeletons.	A phenacodontid.	
Phenacodus	P. vortmani		Near complete skeletons.	A phenacodontid.	
Princetonia	P. yalensis	Locality SC-121(?)	Right dentary.	An arctocyonid.	
Sifrhippus	S. grangeri	Locality SC-67.	2 isolated teeth as well as more than two dozen lower molars used by Secord et al., (2012). Nearly complete skeleton described by Wood et al., (2011).	An equid, formerly considered a species of Hyracotherium.	
Sifrhippus	S. sandrae	Localities FG-61, SC-67, SC-69, SC-79, SC-121 and SC-139.		An equid, formerly considered a species of Hyracotherium.	
Thryptacodon	T. antiquus			An arctocyonid.	
Thryptacodon	T. barae	Localities MP-38 and SC-121.		An arctocyonid.	
Thryptacodon	T. olseni			An arctocyonid.	
Thryptacodon	T. sp.		2 partial skeletons.	An arctocyonid.	
Wasatchia	cf. W. dorseyana		USGS 16470 (a very incomplete skeleton).	Now a junior synonym of Bunophorus.	
Xenicohippus		Lower part of the Upper Willwood Formation.		A hyracotheriine.	

=== Reptiles ===
Color key: Taxon / Reclassified taxon / Taxon falsely reported as present / Dubious taxon or junior synonym / Ichnotaxon / Ootaxon / Morphotaxon	Notes; Uncertain or tentative taxa are in small text; ~~crossed out~~ taxa are discredited.

==== Birds ====
Birds reported from the Willwood Formation
Genus	Species	Presence	Material	Notes	Images
Anachronornis	A. anhimops	Clark Quadrangle, Park County, Wyoming.	USNM 496700.	An anseriform.	
Anseriformes Familia Incertae sedis		Clark Quadrangle, Park County, Wyoming.	USNM 496701 (right quadrate missing the pterygoid condyle); USNM 496702 (fragmentary right femur consisting of only the proximal and distal ends).	Generally similar to Anachronornis & Danielsavis.	
Aves indet.		Localities SC-67 and SC-121.	A cervical vertebra and proximal part of a carpometacarpus.	An indeterminate bird.	
Calcardea	C. junnei		"UM 76882, anterior part of sternum, partial left coracoid. nearly complete right coracoid, partial left humerus. two nearly complete vertebrae. fragmentary left and right tarsometatarsi, and several phalanges, all probably representing a single individual bird."	Originally thought to be a heron, now thought to be related to Vastanavis.	
Diatryma	D. gigantea		Several specimens.	Now deemed a junior synonym of Gastornis.	
Eogeranoides	E. campivagus		"Fragmentary tibiotarsus and tarsometatarsus remains".	A dubious geranoidid, may be a junior synonym of Paragrus prentici.	
Gastornis	G. gigantea		Several specimens.	A gastornithiform.	
Geranoides	G. jepseni	Elk Creek, Bighorn Basin.		A geranoidid, now deemed a junior synonym of Palaeophasianus meleagroides.	
Microolithus	M. wilsoni		Partial eggs.	Fossil bird eggs.	
Palaeophasianus	"P." incompletus		"A fragmentary distal end of a tarsometatarsus".	A very large possible geranoidid, may actually belong to the genus Paragrus or be outside Geranoididae entirely.	
Palaeophasianus	P. meleagroides	Elk Creek, Bighorn Basin.		A geranoidid.	
Palaeophasianus	?P. sp.		AMNH 5156.	A geranoidid.	
Paracathartes	P. howardae			A lithornithid.	
Paragrus	P. prentici			A geranoidid.	
Primoptynx	P. poliotauros		Specimen including all major postcranial bones.	A large owl.	
Sandcoleus	S. copiosus	Clark Quadrangale, Park County, Wyoming.	"Two articulated partial skeletons and a number of other elements".	A sandcoleid mousebird.	

==== Crocodilians ====
Crocodilians reported from the Willwood Formation
Genus	Species	Presence	Material	Notes	Images
Allognathosuchus	A. sp.	Localities SC-67, SC-139, SC-342 and SC-349.		An alligatorid.	
Crocodilia indet.		Localities SC-67, SC-69 and SC-121.	Dermal scutes and vertebral centra.	May represent either large Allognathosuchus or small Borealosuchus.	
Borealosuchus	B. sp.	Localities SC-67, SC-79, SC-139, SC-342, SC-345 and SC-350.			
Orthogenysuchus	O. olseni			A caiman.	
Boverisuchus	B. sp.	Locality SC-348.	A single tooth (UM 83817m).		

==== Squamates ====
Squamates reported from the Willwood Formation
Genus	Species	Presence	Material	Notes	Images
Anguidae indet.			2 fragmentary dentaries (UM 76872 and 76873).	A very small anguid lizard.	
Anguimorpha			A dentary, maxilla and 1 or 2 premaxillae (UM 76874–76875, 76878-76879(?), and 768811).	A gerrhonotine or diploglossine.	
Anguimorpha	Anguimorph CG		"UCMP 150871, 150872 (jaw frag-ments), 150920 (jaw fragment), 150969 (parietal fragment),151038 (left frontal), 151067 (right maxilla fragment), 151095 (right maxilla fragment), 167499 (right maxilla fragment), 167553 (left maxilla fragment)".		
Anniealexandria	A. gansi	UCMP locality V99019.	Skull fragments and vertebrae.	An amphisbaenian.	
Anolbanolis	A. banalis	UCMP locality V99019.		An iguanian.	
Apodosauriscus	A. thermophilus	UCMP locality V99019.	Skull fragments.	An anguid.	
Blutwurstia	B. oliviae	Clarks Fork Basin.		A xenosaurid.	
cf. Eodiploglossus	cf. E. sp. CG		"UCMP 150916 (right maxilla fragment), 150919 (right frontal), 150962 (partial left frontal), 151070, 151071 (skull fragments), 167338 (partial right frontal), 167426 (left maxilla fragment), 167447 (left maxilla fragment), 167456 (jaw fragment),?167527 (right pterygoid fragment), 167602 (right dentary fragment), 400180 (right maxilla fragment)".	An anguid.	
Gaultia	G. silvaticus	UCMP locality V99019.		A glyptosaurine.	
Gerrhonotinae	Gerrhonotine CG		Skull fragments.	An alligator lizard.	
Glyptosaurinae	Glyptosaurine CG		"UCMP 151033 (right maxilla fragment), ?151068 (left pterygoid fragment), 151935 (parietal fragment), 167269 (parietal fragment),?167613 (right palatine fragment)."	A glyptosaurine.	
Iguanidae	Iguanid CG		"UCMP 151078 (right dentary fragment), 400156 (partial right postorbital), 400169 (partial right squamosal)".	An iguanid lizard.	
Kopidosaurus	K. perplexus	YPM locality 24	A partial skull	A pleurodont iguanian of uncertain affinities	
Lacertilia indet.		Localities SC-67 and SC-308.	Vertebrae.	Indeterminate lizards.	
Melanosaurus	M. maximus		A frontal, numerous osteoderms and vertebrae.	A glyptosaurine.	
Palaeoxantusia	P. sp. CG		Skull fragments.	A night lizard.	
Proxestops	Cf. P. sp.	Locality MP-40.	UM 88170m (2 osteoderms).	A glyptosaurine.	
Proxestops	P. sp. CG		Skull fragments.	A glyptosaurine.	
Provaranosaurus	cf. P. sp. CG		"UCMP 167299 (right dentary fragment)".	A xenosaurid.	
cf. Saniwa	cf. S. sp. CG-1		"UCMP 150921 (jaw fragment with partial tooth), 151099 (premaxilla), 167572 (jaw fragment with tooth)".	A varanid.	
cf. Saniwa	cf. S. sp. CG-2		"UCMP 150873 (right dentary fragment with tooth), 150971 (tooth), 167324 (distal right humerus), 167336 (edentulous left dentary fragment), 167355 (parietal fragment)".	A varanid.	
Suzanniwana	S. patriciana	UCMP locality V99019.		An iguanid.	
Varanoidea			A dentary and maxilla (UM 76876 and 768771).	One or possibly 2 species of Parasaniwa or Provaranosaurus-like varanoids.	
Xantusiidae	Xantusiid CG		"UCMP 150827 (right maxilla fragment), 150965 (maxilla fragment), 150970 (right maxilla fragment), 167413 (left frontal fragment), 167495 (right maxilla fragment), 167575 (premaxilla), 167599 (right maxilla fragment), 167600 (left maxilla fragment)".	A night lizard.	

==== Testudines ====
Testudines reported from the Willwood Formation
Genus	Species	Presence	Material	Notes	Images
Chelonia indet.		Localities SC-67, SC-121 and SC-348.	Several pieces of the carapace and plastron.	Indeterminate medium to large turtles.	
Echmatemys	E. sp.	Locality SC-67.	Much of the plastron and several peripherals or pleurals from the carapace (UM 83627), and a peripheral (UM 66617m).		
Gomphochelys	G. nanus	Southeastern Bighorn Basin, Washakie County, Wyoming.		A dermatemydid.	
Cf. Plastomenus	Cf. P. sp.	Localities SC-67 and SC-350.	Fragmentary pieces of the carapace and plastron.	A trionychid.	

=== Amphibians ===
Amphibians reported from the Willwood Formation
Genus	Species	Presence	Material	Notes	Images
Anura			Distal end of a humerus (UM 76883).	A small frog.	
Urodela			Numerous vertebrae, UM 76871 (a-j).	A small salamander.	

=== Fish ===
Fish reported from the Willwood Formation
Genus	Species	Presence	Material	Notes	Images
Amia	A. sp.	Localities SC-67 and SC-342.	Isolated cervical vertebrae, and a concretion of broken bones including 1 or 2 tooth-bearing bones likely belonging to Amia.	A bowfin.	
Cuneatus	C. maximus			A large gar.	
Lepisosteus	L. sp.		"Mostly diamond-shaped ganoid scales, but some specimens include distinct opisthocoelous vertebrae, basioccipitals and other cranial elements."	A gar.	

=== Invertebrates ===
Color key: Taxon / Reclassified taxon / Taxon falsely reported as present / Dubious taxon or junior synonym / Ichnotaxon / Ootaxon / Morphotaxon	Notes; Uncertain or tentative taxa are in small text; ~~crossed out~~ taxa are discredited.

==== Invertebrate ichnotaxa ====
Invertebrate ichnotaxa reported from the Willwood Formation
Ichnogenus	Ichnospecies	Presence	Material	Notes	Images
Camborygma	C. litonomos	Polecat Bench.	Prismatic cylindrical structures.	Likely represent crayfish burrows.	
Cocoon traces		Polecat Bench.			
Cf. Cylindricum	Cf. C. isp.	Polecat Bench.	"Predominantly vertical, straight to sinuous, unbranched, unlined, and smooth walled shafts with circular cross sections and gently rounded, unenlarged terminations".	Burrows possibly created by beetles, hymenopterans, emerging cicada nymphs, spiders or molluscs.	
Edaphichnium	E. lubricatum	Polecat Bench.	"Tubular burrows with ellipsoidal fecal pellets".	Formed by substrate feeding by Earthworms or other invertebrates.	
Naktodemasis	N. bowni	Bighorn Basin.	"Burrows composed of nested ellipsoidal packets backfilled with thin, tightly spaced, menisci subparallel to the bounding packet."	Burrows likely constructed by burrowing bugs or cicada nymphs.	
cf. Planolites	cf. P. isp.	Polecat Bench.		Traces made by the feeding of worm-like animals.	
cf. Steinchnus	S. isp.	Polecat Bench.		Traces made by invertebrates, possibly beetles or mole crickets.	

==== Gastropods ====
Gastropods reported from the Willwood Formation
Genus	Species	Presence	Material	Notes	Images
Cf. Albertanella	Cf. A. minuta			A pupillid.	
Discus	D. ralstonensis		Many individuals (some juvenile specimens).	An endodontid.	
Elimia or Pleurocera	E. or P. sp.		Some 25 specimens, many are internal molds.	A pleurocerid.	
Grangerella	cf. G.(?) phenacodorum		2 specimens originally referred to Protoboysia complicata.	A grangerellid.	
Grangerella	G. sinclairi			A grangerellid.	
Cf. Gyraulus	Cf. G. sp.	Locality SC-69.	A poorly-preserved planispiral internal mold.	A pulmonatan.	
Hendersonia	H. evanstonensis		Several specimens, none preserving the operculum.	A helicinid.	
Holospira	H. sp.	Localities SC-67, SC-139, SC-345 and SC-349.	7 individuals.	An urocoptid.	
"Hydrobia"	"H." sp.	Locality SC-69.	"A very small, dextral, high-spired shell with 9 whorls".	A hydrobiid.	
Cf. Microphysula	Cf. M. sp.		A single individual.	A sagdid.	
Oreohelix	O. megarche		A single specimen (UM(I) 65404).	An oreohelicid.	
Cf. Pupilla	Cf. P. sp.		UM(I) 654071.	A pupillid.	

=== Plants ===
Plants reported from the Willwood Formation
Genus	Species	Presence	Material	Notes	Images
Celtis	C. phenacodorum		Endocarps.	An urticale.	

== Wasatchian correlations ==
Wasatchian correlations in North America
Formation	Wasatch	DeBeque	Claron	Indian Meadows	Pass Peak	Tatman	Willwood	Golden Valley	Coldwater	Allenby	Kamloops	Ootsa Lake	Margaret	Nanjemoy	Hatchetigbee	Tetas de Cabra	Hannold Hill	Coalmont	Cuchara	Galisteo	San Jose	Ypresian (IUCS) • Itaboraian (SALMA) Bumbanian (ALMA) • Mangaorapan (NZ)
Basin	Powder River Uinta Piceance Colorado Plateau Wind River Green River Bighorn	Piceance	Colorado Plateau	Wind River	Green River	Bighorn		Williston	Okanagan	Princeton	Buck Creek	Nechako	Sverdrup	Potomac	GoM	Laguna Salada	Rio Grande	North Park	Raton	Galisteo	San Juan	Willwood Formation (North America)
Country	United States								Canada					United States		Mexico	United States					Willwood Formation (North America)
Copelemur																						Willwood Formation (North America)
Coryphodon																						Willwood Formation (North America)
Diacodexis																						Willwood Formation (North America)
Homogalax																						Willwood Formation (North America)
Oxyaena																						Willwood Formation (North America)
Paramys																						Willwood Formation (North America)
Primates																						Willwood Formation (North America)
Birds																						Willwood Formation (North America)
Reptiles																						Willwood Formation (North America)
Fish																						Willwood Formation (North America)
Insects																						Willwood Formation (North America)
Flora																						Willwood Formation (North America)
Environments	Alluvial-fluvio-lacustrine	Fluvial				Fluvial	Fluvio-lacustrine	Fluvial	Lacustrine		Fluvio-lacustrine		Deltaic-paludal	Shallow marine		Fluvial	Shallow marine	Fluvial		Fluvial		Wasatchian volcanoclastics Wasatchian fauna Wasatchian flora
Volcanic	Yes	No							Yes	No	Yes	No	Yes	No						Yes	No	Wasatchian volcanoclastics Wasatchian fauna Wasatchian flora

== See also ==
- List of fossiliferous stratigraphic units in Wyoming
- Paleontology in Wyoming
- Tatman Formation
- Wasatch Formation
