= Microolithus =

Microolithus Temporal range: Early Eocene

Egg fossil classification
- Basic shell type: Ornithoid
- Morphotype: Ornithoid-ratite
- Oofamily: †Medioolithidae
- Oogenus: †Microolithus; Jackson, Varricchio & Corsini, 2013

Oospecies
- M. wilsoni Jackson et al. 2013

Microolithus is an oogenus of fossil bird egg from Wyoming, with preserved embryonic remains inside some of its specimens.

== History ==
Fossil bird eggs from the Paleogene are rare in North America, and have only occasionally been examined microstructurally and compared to modern birds. The specimens that would later be named Microolithus were collected in 1940 by the paleontologist R. W. Wilson. In 2013, paleontologists from Montana State University Frankie D. Jackson and David J. Varricchio teamed up with Joseph A. Corsini from Eastern Oregon University to analyze these specimens, which they assigned to a new oogenus and oospecies, Microolithus wilsoni. This would be only the second oogenus of Paleogene bird egg to be named in North America (the first being Incognitoolithus).

== Distribution ==
The known specimens of Microolithus were found in the Eocene Willwood Formation in Park County, Wyoming.

== Description ==
Microolithus is, as its name suggests, a small egg; the smallest specimen is 37 mm (1.5 in) by 30 mm (1.2 in). Like all medioolithids, it is roughly spherical. The eggshell is 600 μm thick, and its outer surface is smooth and glossy, but this may be due to erosion.

Its eggshell is composed of three structural layers. The outermost layer (the external layer) contacts the middle layer (the continuous layer), abruptly. The continuous layer has squamatic texture obscuring the prism-shaped eggshell units. The innermost layer (the mammillary layer) makes up one-fourth of the eggshell's thickness, and has an abrupt but wavy boundary with the continuous layer. The eggshell has circular pores with a density of 1.08 per square millimeter.

Some Mircoolithus specimens have embryonic remains of long bones and possibly vertebra, but no useful characteristics for determining which bones or to what bird group they belong are preserved. The periosteum of these bones is somewhat porous.

Microolithus is very similar to modern bird eggs, even more so than Metoolithus and the other known Paleogene bird eggs. It closely resembles modern neognaths, especially the sandhill crane.

== Parataxonomy ==
Because of the numerous similarities of Microolithus wilsoni to the German Medioolithus, they are classified together (along with Incognitoolithus) in the oofamily Medioolithidae.
