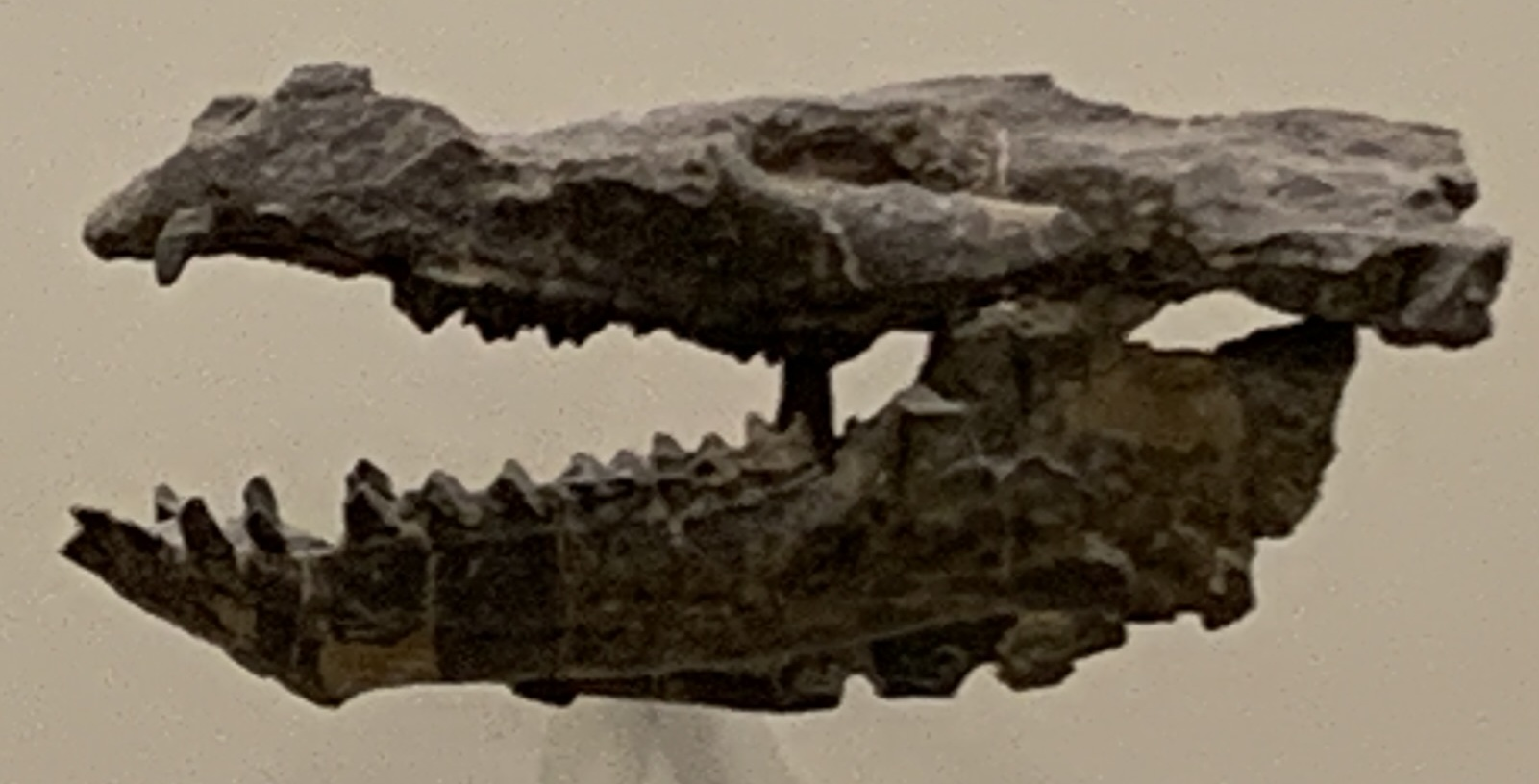
- H. tapirinus, Wyoming. At the AMNH.

Scientific classification
- Kingdom: Animalia
- Phylum: Chordata
- Class: Mammalia
- Order: Perissodactyla
- Family: †Isectolophidae
- Genus: †Homogalax; Hay, 1899

Species
- †H. protapirinus

= Homogalax =

Homogalax Temporal range: Early Eocene

Genus of odd-toed ungulates

Homogalax (from the Greek "ὁμογάλαξ") is an extinct genus of tapir-like odd-toed ungulate. It was described on the basis of several fossil finds from the northwest of the United States, whereby the majority of the remains come from the state of Wyoming. The finds date to the Lower Eocene between 56 and 48 million years ago. In general, Homogalax was very small, only reaching the weight of today's peccaries, with a maximum of 15 kg. Phylogenetic analysis suggests the genus to be a basal member of the clade that includes today's rhinoceros and tapirs (collectively called Ceratomorpha). In contrast to these, Homogalax was adapted to fast locomotion.

== Taxonomy ==
Homogalax is a genus from the order Perissodactyla. It is a basal representative, usually placed in the potentially paraphyletic family Isectolophidae. If the paraphyletic position is correct, Homogalax nests as more derived than most other isectolophids, with only Cardiolophus and Orientolophus, and a clade including Karagalax and Gandheralophus, being closer to the Ceratomorpha.

Below is a phylogenetic tree based on Bai et al (2020), with particular focus on the Isectolophidae (recovered as paraphyletic).

- - Protorohippus venticolum
  - - Sifrhippus sandrae
    - - - Chowliia laoshanensis
        - Ampholophus luensis
      - - - Meridiolophus expansus
          - Isectolophus
        - - Homogalax
          - - Cardiolophus
            - - Orientolophus
              - - - Karagalax mamikhelensis
                  - Gandheralophus
                - Ceratomorpha
                  - Lophialetidae
                  - Crown Ceratomorpha
                    - Tapiroidea
                    - Rhinocerotoidea

Today, one species of the genus Homogalax is recognized: H. protapirinus (Wortman, 1896). Other species such as H. tapirinus and H. primaevus have been described in the past, but are considered to be synonyms of H. protapirinus. Species in Asia were also named, such as H. namadicus and H. wutuensis, but these are now to be regarded as representatives of basal chalicotheres such as Protomoropus. Another species, H. reliquius, was later identified as a specimen of Isectolophus.

== Description ==
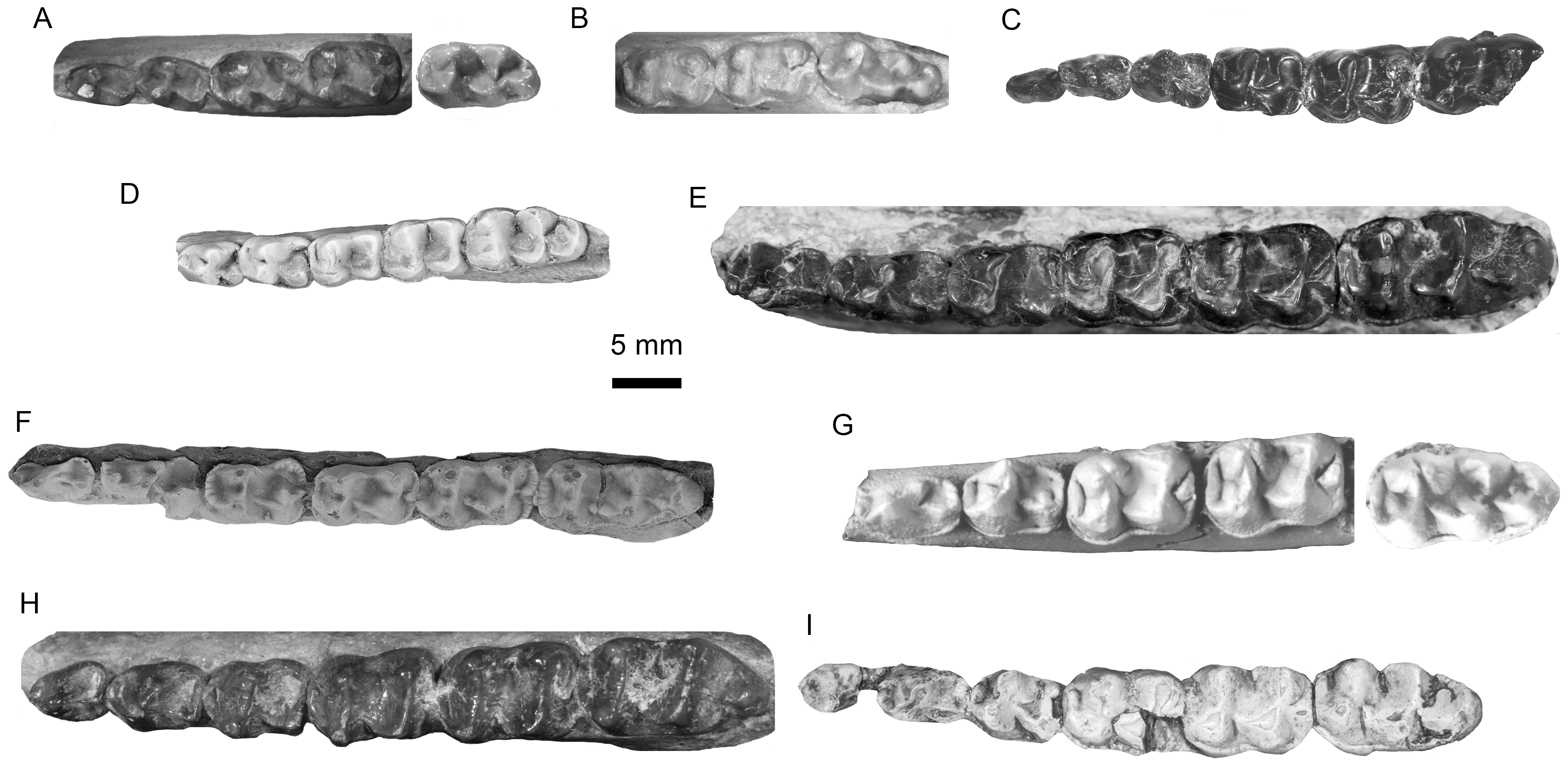
E is lower dentition of H. protapirinus

Homogalax was a small representative of the basal odd-toed ungulates. In general, it resembled other, basal forms of the order Perissodactyla, such as Hyracotherium or Sifrhippus, some of which were well-studied members of the early equids, what shows the very basal position within the odd ungulate. A body weight of 9.5 to 15.1 kg can be assumed on the basis of various skeletal elements. Homogalax is known from numerous fossil finds, which however only partially contain complete material. Underneath is a heavily weathered skull, which, however, shows few skeletal features. This is around 15 cm long and relatively flat, and overall it was similar to that of Hyracotherium . The short premaxilla, which rose steeply and came into contact with the nasal bone, was typical, which is not the case with today's Ceratomorpha (tapirids and rhinocerotids). The ascending central jawbone formed the back of the interior of the nose, which is also unknown in today's odd-toed ungulates. As a result, the nasal bone had only a short extension to the front and only slightly exceeded the canine. The occiput had a distinctly short shape, while the zygomatic arch hardly protruded outwards, instead running parallel to the skull.

The dentition includes the complete set of the early placental mammals. The incisors were chisel-shaped and small, but varied in size. In general, the third (outermost) incisor became the largest. The canine usually had a long and pointed shape and was somewhat pressed on the side. A short, less than 1 cm long diastema occurred to the rear dentition only rarely; others could be observed between the last incisor and the canine as well as between the first two premolars. The premolars themselves were completely unmolarized, meaning they did not resemble the molars, and only had a raised enamel cusp on the chewing surface. The molars were characterized by low (brachyodont) tooth crowns and two tapir-like transverse tooth enamel ridges (bilophodont), which could also be inclined in the lower jaw. The length of the teeth increased towards the back. The first premolar was around 0.6 cm long, the last molar up to 1.7 cm long.

A complete skeleton is not available, but skulls and some postcrania have been preserved. Of particular note among the latter are the long bones. The humerus was built long and narrow and measured about 13 cm. The thigh bone on the other hand reached a length of 15 cm and typically had a third trochanter, which is typical for odd-toed ungulates, but was not yet so prominent in "Homogalax". The shin became as long as the thigh bone. The forefoot consisted of four digits with a very pronounced central toe (metacarpus III). The laterally attached digits (metacarpus II and IV), however, were somewhat reduced in length, the outermost digit (metacarpus V) was greatly reduced. The hind foot, on the other hand, had only three digits, but also had a strong central ray (metatarsus III). Compared to the anterior feet, the posterior ones were around 30% longer (metacarpus III length is 5.1 cm to metatarsus III's 6.7 cm). The individual phalanges of the toes are extremely long. Four-toed front and three-toed hind feet are typical of primitive odd-toed ungulates and are now only found in the tapirs.

== Distribution ==
Finds of Homogalax are largely only known from North America and come from the Lower Eocene 56 to 48 million years ago (locally stratigraphically called Lower Wastachian). They show that Homogalax was a regular but not frequent element of the fauna at that time. In the state of Wyoming in particular, numerous fossils have been recovered. The remains from the Willwood Formation of the Bighorn Basin are of great importance, including more than 100 fragments from several individuals, including a complete skull, which is one of the few well-preserved Homogalax fossils. This also includes the majority of known postcranial skeletal finds, such as individual long bones, a complete foot and hand skeleton and parts of the pelvis and shoulder blades. Other remains are from the Washakie Basin, as well as from the Powder River Basin; both sites, however, contained mostly only isolated teeth. Remnants of the Golden Valley Formation in North Dakota have been reported outside Wyoming. Far away from these sites, the northernmost finds of Homogalax come from the Margaret Formation on the Ellesmere Island in the far north of Canada. They include, among other things, individual teeth.

== Paleobiology ==
Based on the teeth, only a few differences in size and shape can be discerned in specimens of Homogalax. However, the canine varies in size, which can be interpreted as sexual dimorphism. This is unconfirmed, though, as there are also intermediate-length canines. The lower legs, especially on the hindlimbs, show adaptations to a cursorial lifestyle. Among other things, especially pronounced joint surfaces on the ankle bone ensured that the foot remained stable in the longitudinal direction and did not twist sideways at high walking speed. A permanent running gait within the odd-toed ungulates is generally believed to be an ancient characteristic and is only practised today by the highly specialized horses.
