= Incognitoolithus =

Incognitoolithus Temporal range: Early Eocene

Egg fossil classification
- Basic shell type: Ornithoid
- Morphotype: Ornithoid-ratite
- Oofamily: †Medioolithidae
- Oogenus: †Incognitoolithus; Hirsch, Kihm & Zelenitsky, 1997

Oospecies
- I. ramotubulus Hirsch, Kihm & Zelenitsky, 1997

Incognitoolithus is an oogenus of medioolithid fossil bird egg. It is notable for bearing evidence of predation, possibly from a bird pecking the eggshell.

== Distribution ==
Incognitoolithus fragments are found at two localities in the DeBeque Formation in Garfield County, Colorado. Both localities are dated to the Early Eocene.

== History ==
Eggshell fragments of Incognitoolithus were discovered in 1977 and 1979 during two separate field seasons. The oospecies I. ramotubulus was first described in 1997 by Karl Hirsch, Allen Kihm and Darla Zelenitsky.

== Description ==
I. ramotubulus is known from over 200 eggshell fragments which may represent a single disintegrated egg. When complete, the egg is estimated to have been 10–12 cm (3.9–4.7 in) long and 7.5–9 cm (3.0–3.5 in), making it significantly larger than the next largest known Eocene bird egg in North America, which measured only 6.4 x 8.9 cm. The eggshell is 1.27–1.43 mm thick and consists of two structural layers, unlike most modern ratite eggs (which have a third layer, the external layer). The outer layer, called the continuous layer, is three times the thickness of the inner layer (the mammillary layer). It is one of the few fossil eggs to have only two layers and a smooth eggshell.

Incognitoolithus has a distinctive pore system. It has both branching and unbranching pores. The openings of these pores on the surface of the eggshell matches the "aepyornithid" type: Pores open in small pits or in grooves which may accommodate multiple pore openings.

== Paleobiology ==
=== Parentage ===
The pore arrangement and structure of Incognitoolithus is similar to that of Aepyornis. The microstructure and lack of ornamentation are similar to modern ratite eggs. However, since no embryonic remains or parental remains were found with Incognitoolithus, it is impossible to infer what kind of bird laid the eggs.

=== Predation ===
Multiple fragments of Incognitoolithus have been found with holes interpreted as peck marks. While it is possible that these were made by a parent assisting the hatching, this behavior is very rare in modern birds. More likely, they are the result of predation. Experiments on modern chicken eggs by Hirsch et al. in 1997 found that Incognitoolithus's holes are most consistent with those from a bird's peck. However, the dynamics of a thick eggshell like I. ramotubulus differ from those of chicken eggs, so the possibility that the holes are tooth marks of a mammal or reptile cannot be ruled out.

== See also ==
- Medioolithus
