= Anaptomorphus =

Anaptomorphus Temporal range: Middle Eocene–Late Eocene

Scientific classification
- Kingdom: Animalia
- Phylum: Chordata
- Class: Mammalia
- Order: Primates
- Family: †Omomyidae
- Subfamily: †Anaptomorphinae
- Genus: †Anaptomorphus; Cope, 1872

Species
- Anaptomorphus westi (Cope, 1872); Anaptomorphus aemulus (Szalay, 1976)

Extinct genus of primate

Anaptomorphus is a genus of extinct anaptomorphine primate from Eocene South and North America

== Description ==
Compared to other primates from the time, Anaptomorphus is rather advanced in dentition, with the dental formula being 2,1,2,32,1,2,3 × 2 = 32.

== Classification ==
Anaptomorphus is placed within Omomyidae, related to (and often sister clade of) tarsiers. A. homonculus , a species formerly assigned to Anaptomorphus, has been moved to the related genus Tetonius.
