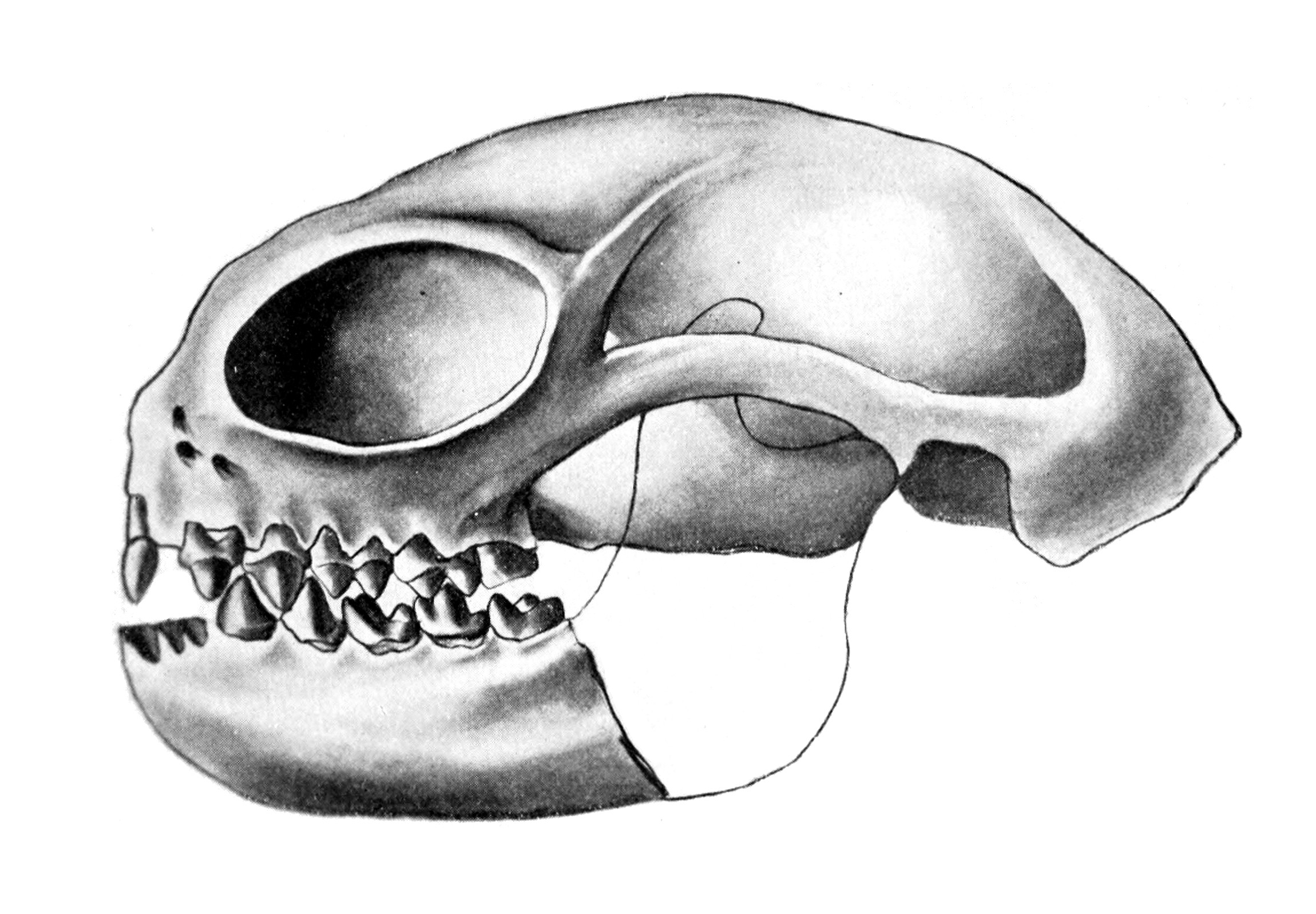
- The skull of Tetonius homunculus, formerly Anaptomorphus homunculus

Scientific classification
- Kingdom: Animalia
- Phylum: Chordata
- Class: Mammalia
- Order: Primates
- Suborder: Haplorhini
- Family: †Omomyidae
- Subfamily: †Anaptomorphinae; Cope, 1883

Genera
- See text.

= Anaptomorphinae =

Anaptomorphinae Temporal range: 56–33 Ma Late Paleocene – Late Eocene

Extinct subfamily of primates

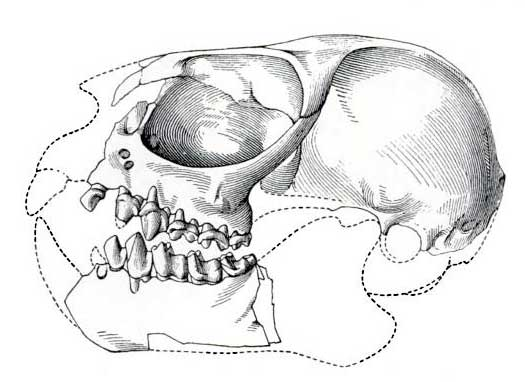
Tetonius homunculus skull

Anaptomorphinae is a pre-historic group of primates known from Eocene fossils in North America and Europe and later periods of Paleocene Asia, and are a sub-family of omomyids. The anaptomorphines is a paraphyletic group consisting of the two tribes Trogolemurini and Anaptomorphini. Anaptomorphine radiation in Wyoming, one of the most detailed records of changes within populations and between species in the fossil record, has provided remarkable evidence of transitional fossils.

== Description ==
Teilhardina is the most primitive of the anaptomorphines with respect to a number of dental features (e.g. four premolars and relatively unreduced canine). Most scientists recognize at least fourteen genera of anaptomorphine. The probable lineages of Tetonius, Absarokius and Anemorhysis evolved from Teilhardinia or a closely related form from North America.

Tetonius and Shoshonius have been classified as belonging to the Tarsiiformes, and are therefore not closely related to human ancestors. The Anaptomorphine population was apparently high during the Early Tertiary. Tetonius from the Early Eocene was first found in the late nineteenth century and is considered important due to the significance of the find in forming the phylogeny of the primates. The last known animal belonging to the group was Trogolemur. Unlike omomyines, anaptomorphines never reached body masses exceeding 500 grams (18 oz). They have been suggested to have been predominantly frugivores.

Analyses of over a hundred specimens of omomyid primates recovered in the Wasatch formation in Wyoming, suggest that anaptomorphines never developed the highly specialised molars seen in modern prosimians. Similarly, incisor enlargement was most likely an adaptation for grooming and food manipulation rather than a purely frugivorous or insectivorous diet.

== Classification ==
- Subfamily †Anaptomorphinae Cope, 1883
  - †Trogolemurini
    - †Sphacorhysis Gunnell, 1995
    - †Trogolemur Matthew, 1909
    - †Walshina López-Torres, Silcox, and Holroyd, 2018
  - †Anaptomorphini Cope, 1883
    - †Absarokius Matthew, 1915
    - †Anemorhysis Gazin, 1958
    - †Anaptomorphus Cope, 1872
    - †Arapahovius Savage & Waters, 1978
    - †Aycrossia Bown, 1979
    - †Bownomomys Morse et al, 2018
    - †Chlororhysis Gazin, 1958
    - †Gazinius Bown, 1979
    - †Mckennamorphus Szalay, 1976
    - †Pseudotetonius Bown, 1974
    - †Strigorhysis Bown, 1979
    - †Tatmanius Bown & Rose, 1991
    - †Teilhardina Simpson, 1940
    - †Tetonius Matthew, 1915
