= Bownomomys =

Bownomomys Temporal range: 56–53 Ma Early Eocene

Scientific classification
- Domain: Eukaryota
- Kingdom: Animalia
- Phylum: Chordata
- Class: Mammalia
- Order: Primates
- Suborder: Haplorhini
- Family: †Omomyidae
- Subfamily: †Anaptomorphinae
- Tribe: †Anaptomorphini
- Genus: †Bownomomys; Morse et al., 2018

Type species
- †Bownomomys americanus (Bown, 1976)

Species
- †Bownomomys americanus (Bown, 1976); †Bownomomys crassidens (Bown and Rose, 1987)

Extinct genus of primates

Bownomomys was an early marmoset-like primate that lived in North America during the Early Eocene epoch, about 56–50 million years ago.

== Taxonomy ==
Teilhardina americana and T. crassidens were originally named as species of Teilhardina, usually considered a member of Omomyidae. However, phylogenetic analysis by Ni et al. (2004) recovered Teilhardina as polyphyletic, with Teilhardina belgica and T. asiatica nested as the basalmost haplorrhines, and T. americana and T. crassidens being recovered as anaptomorphine omomyids (and thus more closely related to the tarsiers than to simians). Teilhardina crassidens was later referred to the genus Baataromomys by Ni et al. (2007). A paper by Morse et al. built upon the cladistic results of Ni et al. (2004) by recognizing T. americana and T. crassidens as belonging to a new genus, which they named Bownomomys.
