= Anolbanolis =

Anolbanolis Temporal range: Early Eocene, 56 Ma

Scientific classification
- Kingdom: Animalia
- Phylum: Chordata
- Class: Reptilia
- Order: Squamata
- Suborder: Iguania
- Infraorder: Pleurodonta
- Genus: †Anolbanolis; Smith, 2009

Species
- †A. banalis Smith, 2009 (type) †A. geminus Smith, 2011

Extinct genus of lizards

Anolbanolis is an extinct genus of iguanian lizards that lived in the Bighorn Basin of what is now Wyoming during the earliest Eocene. The type species A. banalis was named by paleontologist Krister Smith in 2009 from a collection of isolated skull fragments found in a layer of the Willwood Formation that dates to a brief period of global warming called the Paleocene-Eocene thermal maximum (PETM) about 56 million years ago. The genus name Anolbanolis means "poor anole" from the Greek anolbos ("poor, wretched") and the name Anolis, in reference to the scrappy nature of known fossil material and its close resemblance to lizards in the genus Anolis. Smith suggested that Anolbanolis may be a close relative of Anolis or Polychrus, which are common today in Central and South America but not found as far north as Wyoming, fitting with the idea that the Bighorn Basin was warmer and wetter in the Eocene than it is currently. According to Smith, the species name banalis is a reference to it being a "banal" lizard in the Willwood, being "quite abundant in the type locality," and not unusual because "the discovery of Eocene boreal fossil members of living subtropical and tropical clades is becoming commonplace." In 2011 Smith named a second species of Anolbanolis, A. geminus, which lived in the Bighorn Basin shortly after the PETM and was about 50 percent larger than A. banalis. Smith concluded on the basis of features in A. geminus that Anolbanolis is more closely related to Anolis than it is to Polychrus.
