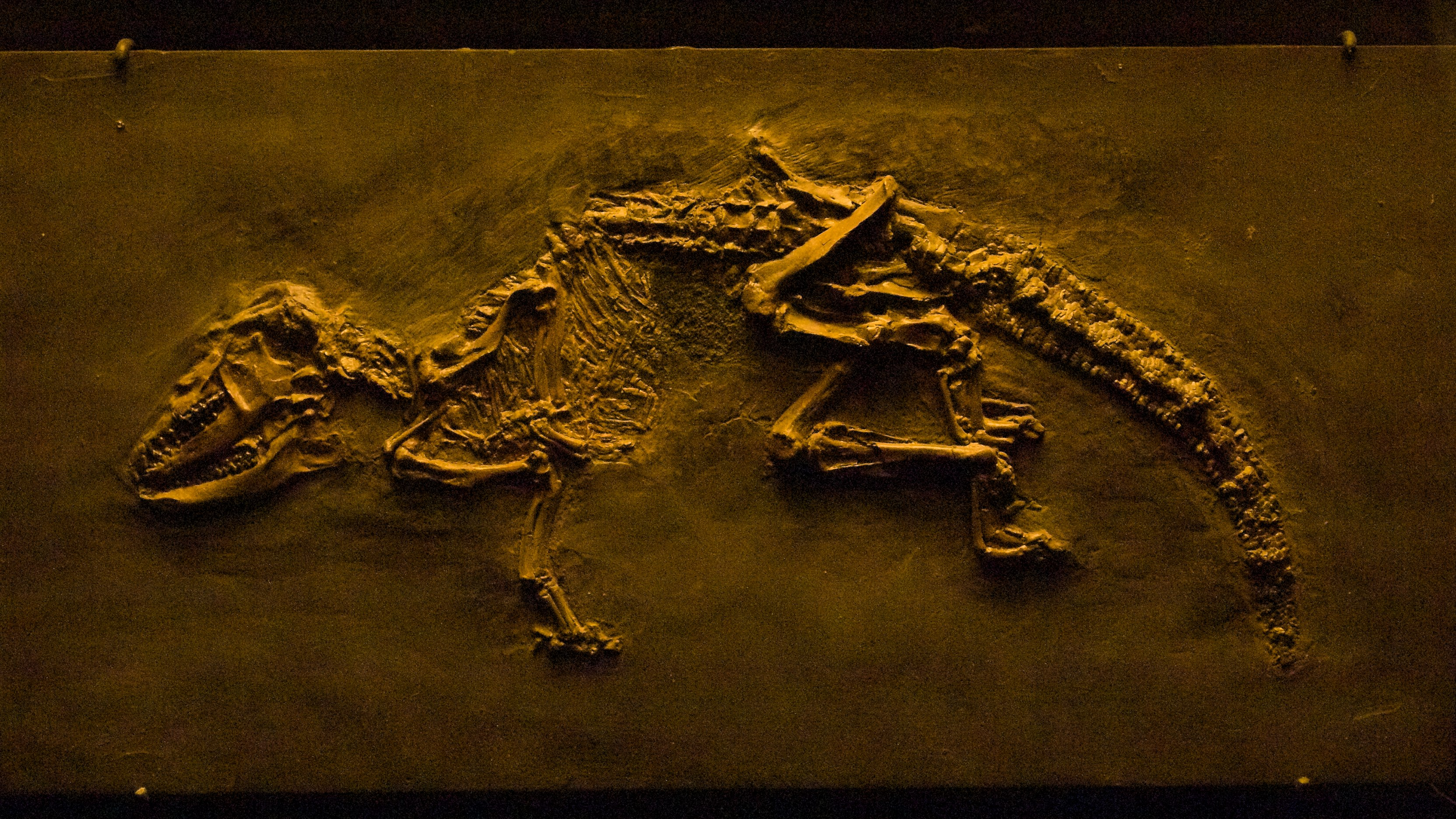
- P. hassiacus at the HMNS

Scientific classification
- Kingdom: Animalia
- Phylum: Chordata
- Class: Mammalia
- Order: Eulipotyphla
- Family: †Amphilemuridae
- Genus: †Pholidocercus von Koenigswald & Storch, 1983

Type species
- P. hassiacus von Koenigswald & Storch, 1983

= Pholidocercus =

Pholidocercus Temporal range: Early Eocene, 47 Ma

Extinct genus of mammals

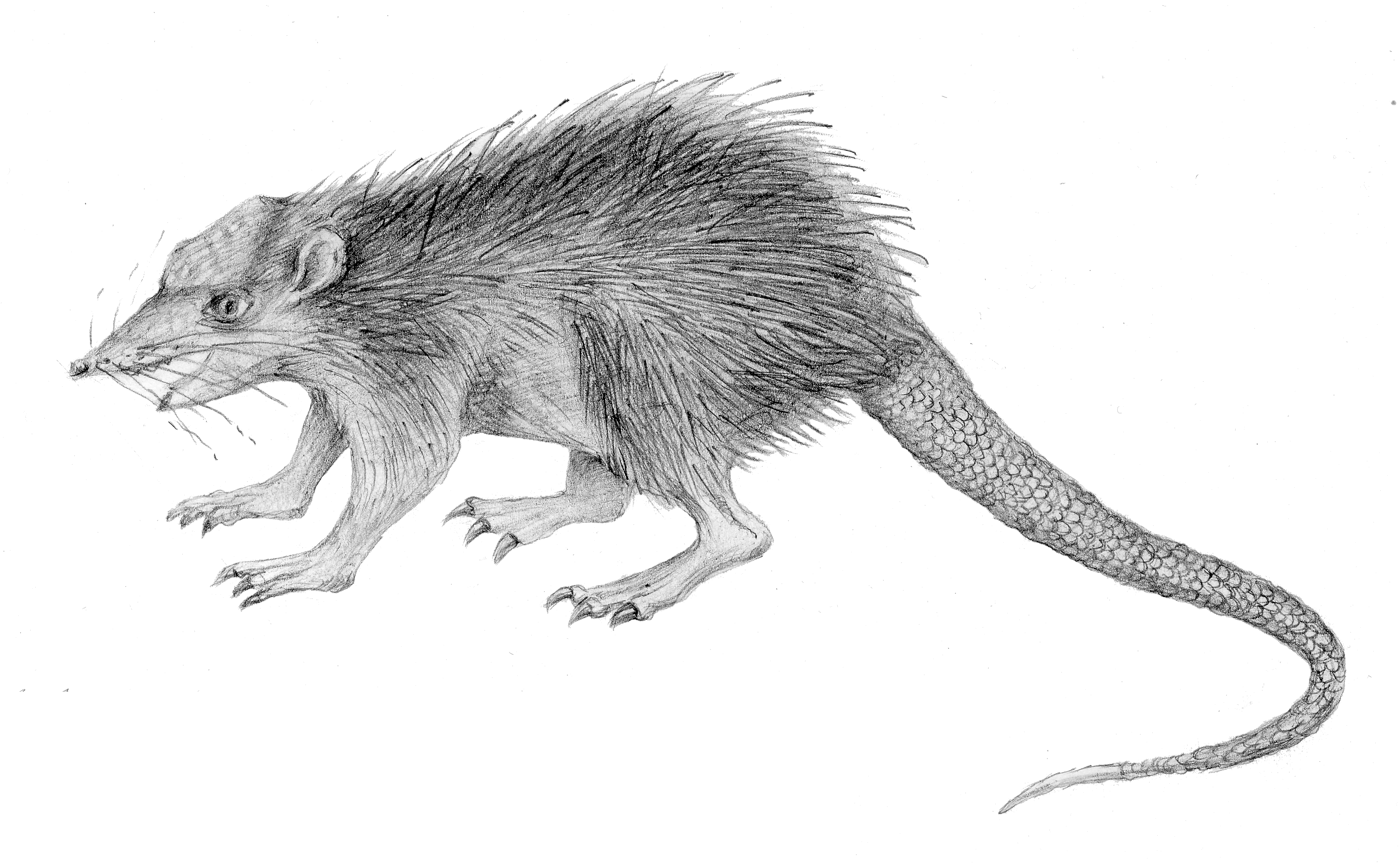
Restoration

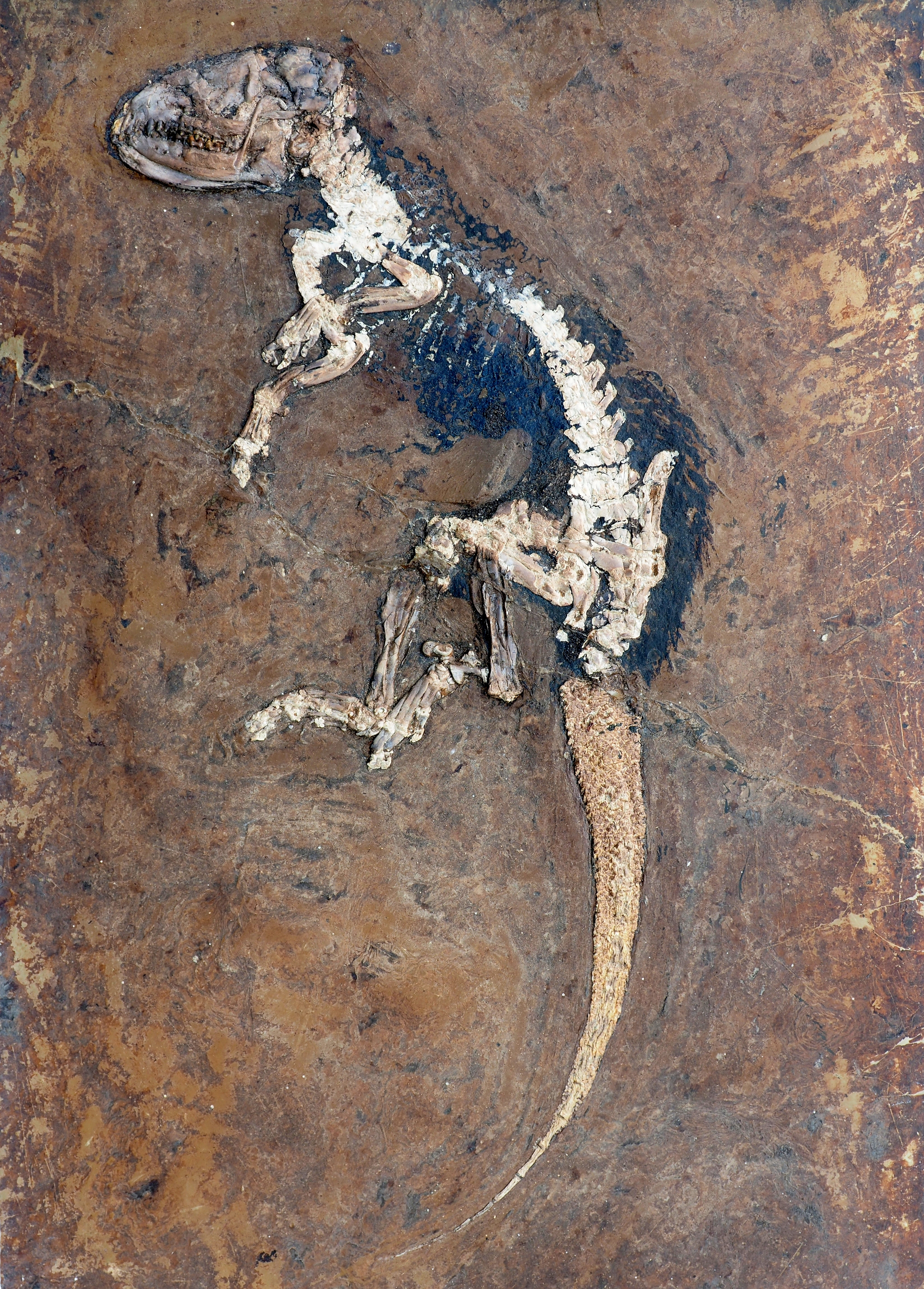
↑Pholidocercus hassiacus von Koenigswald and Storch 1983 with partially preserved fur and long, thick, scaled tail. Paratype of the publication

Pholidocercus is an extinct genus of mammal from the Messel pit related to and resembling the modern-day hedgehog with a single species, Pholidocercus hassiacus. Like the hedgehog, it was covered in thin spines. Unlike hedgehogs, it had scales on its head in a helmet-like formation, and had a long, thick, scaled tail.
