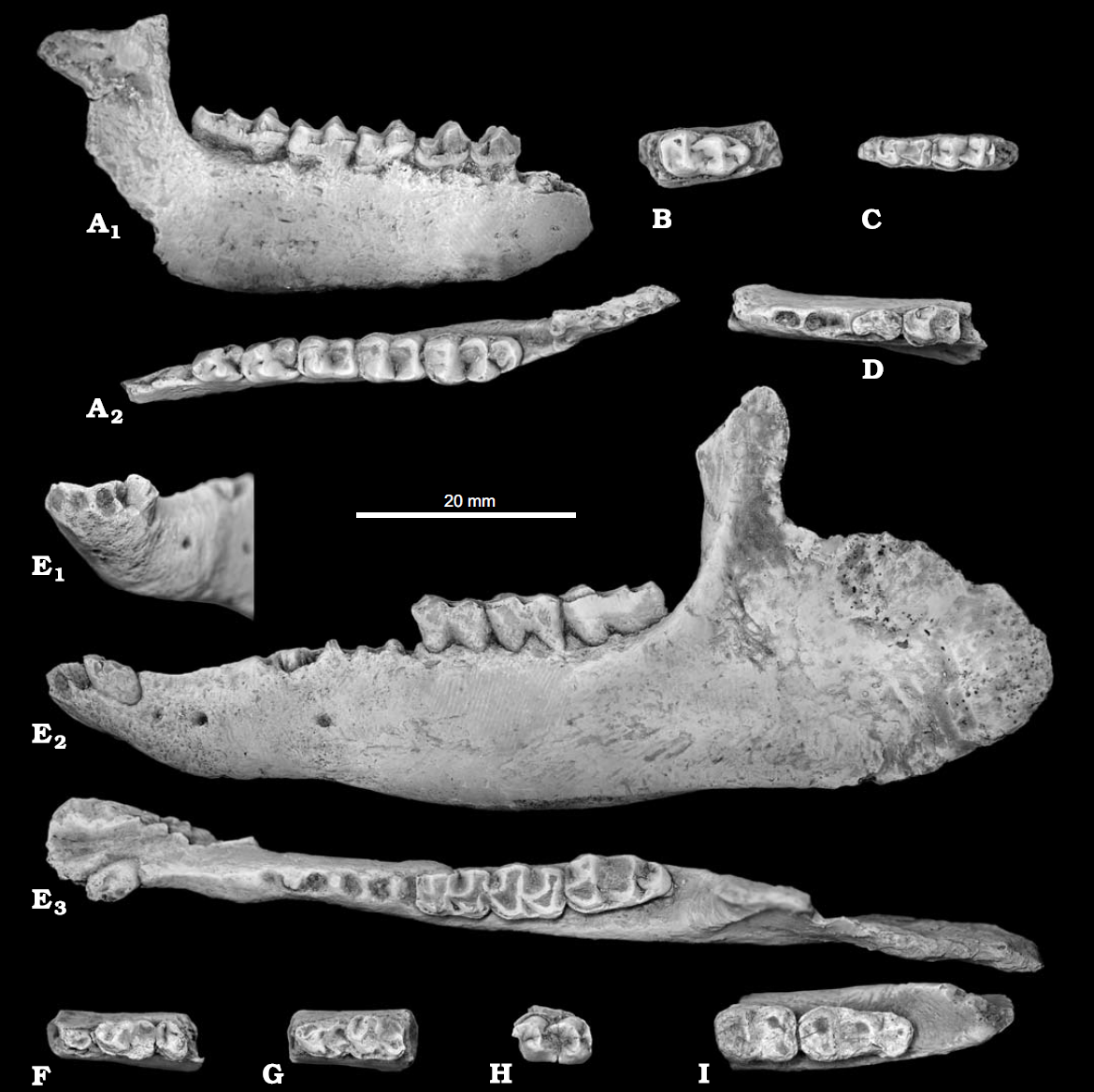
- Lower jaws and teeth of G. minor (A-D) and G. robustus (E-I)

Scientific classification
- Domain: Eukaryota
- Kingdom: Animalia
- Phylum: Chordata
- Class: Mammalia
- Order: Perissodactyla
- Family: †Isectolophidae
- Genus: †Gandheralophus; Missiaen & Gingerich, 2012

Type species
- Gandheralophus minor Missiaen & Gingerich, 2012

Species
- G. minor Missiaen & Gingerich, 2012; G. robustus Missiaen & Gingerich, 2012

= Gandheralophus =

Gandheralophus Temporal range: Early Eocene

Extinct family of mammals

Gandheralophus is an extinct genus of isectolophid perissodactyl mammal known from the Eocene of Pakistan, with two known species: G. minor and G. robustus, both described in 2012.

== Discovery ==
Gandheralophus minor is known from the holotype GSP−UM 6770, a partial dentary with right third premolar to third molar in situ and from many other referred materials. The holotype was collected in the Gandhera Quarry, Balochistan Province of Pakistan, from the late early Eocene (Ypresian stage) of the upper part of the upper Ghazij Formation. G. robustus is known from the holotype GSP−UM 6768, a partial jaw and from other referred materials. All specimens attributed to Gandheralophus represent partial dentaries and lower jaws, and came from the Ypresian stage of the upper part of the upper Ghazij Formation.

== Etymology ==
Gandheralophus was first named by Pieter Missiaen and Philip D. Gingerich in 2012 and the type species is Gandheralophus minor. The generic name is derived from Gandhera, referring to Gandhera Quarry, the locality in which the genus was first reported, and Greek lophus, "crest", a common suffix in tapiromorph names. The specific name of the type species, "minor", comes from Latin for "smaller", in reference to the small size of this species. The specific name of the second species is derived from Latin robustus, "solid", in reference to the larger size and more robust aspect of the dentition in comparison with the type species.
