= Anachronornis =

Anachronornis Temporal range: Latest Paleocene, 56.2–55.8 Ma

Scientific classification
- Kingdom: Animalia
- Phylum: Chordata
- Class: Aves
- Order: Anseriformes
- Family: †Anachronornithidae; Houde, Dickson, & Camarena, 2023
- Genus: †Anachronornis; Houde, Dickson, & Camarena, 2023
- Species: †A. anhimops

Binomial name
- †Anachronornis anhimops Houde, Dickson, & Camarena, 2023

Extinct genus of basal waterfowl

Anachronornis is a genus of extinct bird from the Late Paleocene (Thanetian) of North America. One species has been described, Anachronornis anhimops, from the Willwood Formation in Wyoming. It is a basal anseriform, relative of modern waterfowl.

== Etymology ==
Anachronornis is derived from Ancient Greek ἀναχρονισμός ("out of time") and ὄρνις ("bird"), referring to the unexpectedly late appearance of a species close to the divergence between the two major waterfowl lineages, Anhimae and Anseres. The species name anhimops, from Anhima and ὄψῐς ("face", "appearance"), refers to the appearance of the head and bill to that of the screamer genus Anhima.

== Description ==
Anachronornis has been described as screamer-like in the literature, although it shared characteristics with both screamer-line and duck-line anseriforms, placing it close to the divergence between the two groups. It had a "fowl-like" bill (non-spatulate, the basal condition in Galloanserae), instead of the spatulate bill found in ducks.

== Discovery ==
The holotype, USNM 496700, was found in Park County, Wyoming as part of the Willwood Formation, preserved in a small calcereous nodule. It consists of a mostly complete skull (only missing the pterygoids), as well as assorted postcranial material.

Two other fragments were found in association with the holotype in the nodule. Labelled USNM 496701 and USNM 496702, they consist respectively of a quadrate bone and a fragmentary femur, and have not been assigned to the genus or family with certainty.
