= Medioolithidae =

Medioolithidae Temporal range: Eocene

Egg fossil classification
- Basic shell type: Ornithoid
- Morphotype: Ornithoid-ratite
- Oofamily: †Medioolithidae; Kohring & Hirsch, 1996

Oogenera
- Medioolithus; Metoolithus; Microolithus

Medioolithidae is an oofamily of bird eggs from the Eocene epoch. Their eggshell structure shows a mosaic of avian and non-avian theropod traits.
