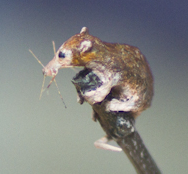

Scientific classification
- Kingdom: Animalia
- Phylum: Chordata
- Class: Mammalia
- Infraclass: Placentalia
- Order: Eulipotyphla
- Family: †Geolabididae
- Genus: †Batodonoides
- Species: †B. vanhouteni

Binomial name
- †Batodonoides vanhouteni Bloch et al. 1998

= Batodonoides vanhouteni =

Batodonoides vanhouteni Temporal range: Eocene, 53 Ma

Extinct shrew-like mammal

Batodonoides vanhouteni is an extinct shrew-like mammal, thought to be the smallest mammal that ever lived, as well as the smallest synapsid that ever lived. On the basis of the size of its molar teeth, it is estimated that Batodonoides vanhouteni weighed only 0.93–1.82 g (0.03–0.06 oz) (with 1.3 g (0.05 oz) most likely). They lived about 53 million years ago during the early Eocene Epoch in North America. The species is a member of the order Eulipotyphla.

The fossilized remains of a juvenile, consisting of a mandible and some teeth, were discovered in 1998 in Wyoming in 53-million-year-old rocks. Another member of the genus is known from California, also from the Early Eocene.
