= Tetonius =

Tetonius Temporal range: Middle Eocene–Late Eocene
- Skull of T. homunculus

Scientific classification
- Kingdom: Animalia
- Phylum: Chordata
- Class: Mammalia
- Order: Primates
- Family: †Omomyidae
- Subfamily: †Anaptomorphinae
- Genus: †Tetonius; Cope, 1872

Species
- Tetonius homonculus (Cope, 1872); Tetonius matthewi (Bown and Rose, 1987); Tetonius mckennai (Bown and Rose, 1987); Tetonius varleyorum (Rhinehart, 2026)

Synonyms
- Anaptomorphus homonculus (Cope, 1872)

Genus of anaptomorphine primate

Tetonius is a genus of anaptomorphine omomyid primate from Eocene Wyoming. Similar to other omomyids, Tetonius was small bodied, with large orbits and specialized teeth indicating an omnivorous diet. Tetonius is one of multiple primates which existed in North America during the Eocene. Despite having large eyes, it is unknown if Tetonius was diurnal or nocturnal. Often compared to modern tarsiers, Tetonius and other omomyids lived in trees. Tetonius was rather small, with its skull measuring around 3 centimetres (1.2 in) in length.

Fossils of Tetonius were originally discovered by fossil collector Jacob Wortman in 1881, and the first species of the genus was named by Edward Drinker Cope in 1884. Originally thought to be a direct ancestor to humans, these fossils were attributed to the genus Anaptomorphus, and were later moved to Tetonius by W.D Matthew. The relationships between Tetonius and the other omomyids with the rest of the primates has been debated historically, with various researchers suggesting affinities ranging from being closer to simians to being within the modern Tarsiidae.

== Taxonomy ==
Tetonius belongs to the Omomyidae, a family of primates of debated taxonomic classification. Related most closely to the living tarsiers, Tetonius and other omomyids are considered by some to be stem haplorrhines (dry nosed primates), while others consider them to be stem tarsiiformes. Tetonius has been historically ascribed to the subfamily Anaptomorphinae and tribe Anaptomorphini, within their own subtribe, the Tetoniina. Tetonius homunculus is the type species of the genus, with other known species being T. mckennai, T. matthewi and T. varleyorum. Other species historically assigned to the genus have been reassigned to a related genus, Pseudotetonius, including "T. ambiguus".

=== History of research ===
The similarity of Tetonius to the anaptomorphines has even caused the type species, T. homunculus, to be ascribed to Anaptomorphus historically. It was split from the genus by W.D Matthew in 1915, citing an analysis done by Jacob Wortman in 1904 which found the species likely to be generically distinct.

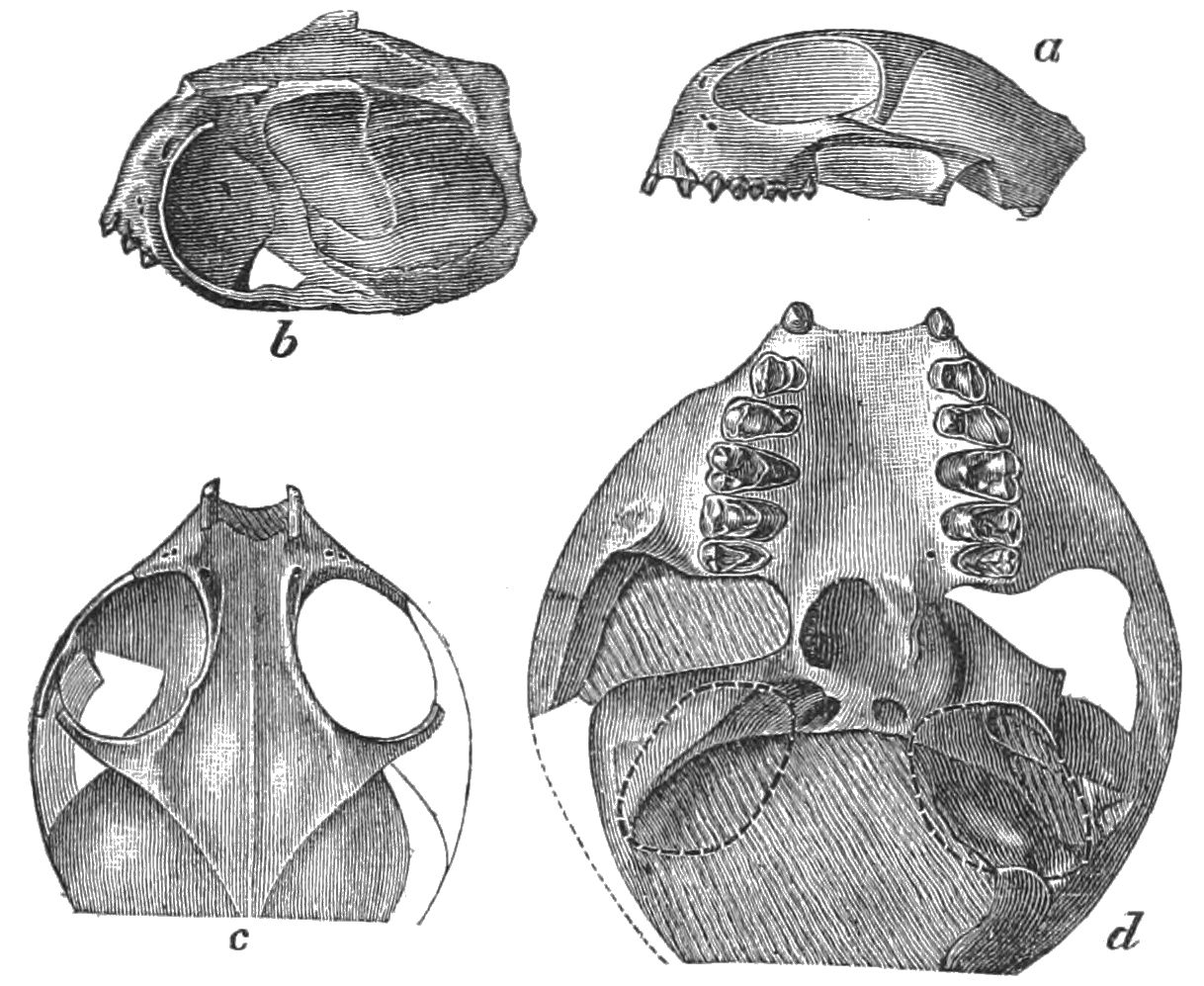
The skull of T.homunculus as figured in Cope's description

First discovered in the Wasatch beds of Wyoming by Wortman, the fossils of T. homunculus were figured and named by Edward Drinker Cope in 1885. Cope considered Tetonius (then Anaptomorphus) a direct ancestor of humans, a view held by other researchers at the time. Described as larger than Anaptomorphus aemulus, T. homunculus remained ascribed to Anaptomorphus, until Jacob Wortman did analysis which questioned the position of T. homunculus within the genus Anaptomorphus. Wortman, in this analysis, considered "Anaptomorphus" homunculus an anthropoid, and placed it within the Paleopithecini. W.D Matthew, alongside Walter W. Granger, in 1915, split the species from Anaptomorphus proper, and described other species within Tetonius, T. ambiguus (now Pseudotetonius ambiguus) and Tetonius musculus (now Anemorhysis minutus). Matthew erected the Tarsiiformes in this work, and placed 2 families within the order, the Tarsiidae (modern tarsiers) and the Microchoeridae (extinct tarsier-like primates), with Tetonius belonging to the latter. Within the Microchoeridae, Matthew kept Wortman's Anaptomorphinae and Omomyinae.

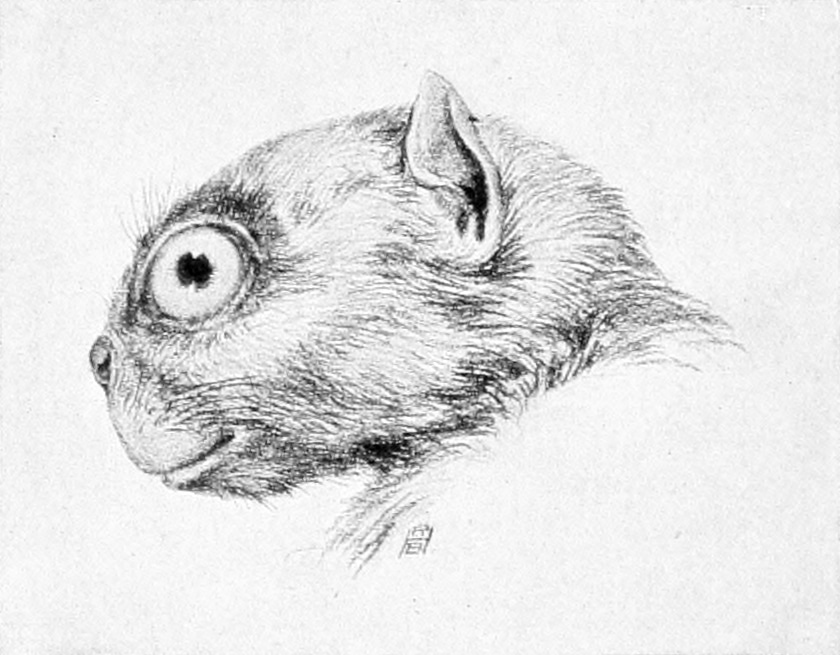
Historical reconstruction of T. homunculus, done by Robert Bruce Horsfall for William Berryman Scott's "A History of Land Mammals in the Western Hemisphere." Based on the holotype, the referenced skull lacks the premaxilla, which gives the animal a stout-looking face which was less pronounced in life.

George Gaylord Simpson, in his 1937 work on the fauna of the Fort Union Formation, refers to Tetonius and relatives as "tarsioids", though in a later work describing the anatomy of Hemiacodon, Simpson began to doubt the dichotomy of the lemuroid/tarsioids in regards to prosimian taxonomy, stating that Tetonius and related genera have a blend of lemuroid and tarsioid traits. In 1955, Simpson published a work which argued that the Anaptomorphidae (another name for the Microchoeridae) is not a natural group, and that tarsioid traits present in genera assigned to the group are simply primitive traits for prosimians. In 1958, Charles Lewis Gazin split off omomyines from the anaptomorphines, raising Omomyinae to the family level (Omomyidae) and retaining the Anaptomorphidae (including Tetonius). Even with this, Gazin stated that even with the removal of the omomyids from Anaptomorphidae, the group still seems to represent an unnatural assemblage of genera.

In 1961, Elwyn L. Simons argued that the material of Tetonius is not sufficient to refer it, or any North American anaptomorphid or omomyid, to the tarsioids. Simons postulated that a tarsioid affinity for the omomyids and anaptomorphids might be possible, but then stated that the age of the lineages makes it hard to find a definitive link. Fredrick S. Szalay synonymized the Anaptomorphidae with the Omomyidae in 1976, and erected the Tetoniina as a tribe, in which 2 species, T. homunculus and T. ambiguus were placed, alongside a species which was unnamed. Despite placing T. ambiguus within Tetonius, Szalay stated that the type specimen of T. ambiguus is so poor that the placement of the species is difficult. In 1974, T. ambiguus was moved to the new genus Pseudotetonius by Thomas M. Bown, based on differences in the dentition. Similarly, in 1960, Malcom McKenna moved T. musculus to Anemorhysis, under A. minutus, something which was proposed by Gazin in 1958.

T. mckennai and T. matthewi were described by Bown and Kenneth D. Rose in 1987, with T. mckennai being described from the unnamed specimens written about by Szalay in 1976. Philip Gingerich described another species of Tetonius in 1980, T. steini, but this species was synonymized with T. matthewi by Bown and Rose. In 2026, another species of Tetonius was described, T. varleyorum.

== Description ==
=== Cranium ===
The skull of Tetonius has a large braincase and a shortened snout. The preserved skull of Tetonius homunculus (specimen AMNH 4194) , which is missing most of the premaxilla and basioccipital region, is around 3 centimetres (1.2 in) in length. The maxilla of T. homunculus is thin, likely due to the size of the orbits. The tympanic bullae of T. homunculus were extended anteriorly, and were overrun by the external pterygoid process. Because of this, the position of the foramen ovale is similar to those of Tarsius. Compared to other Wasatch Formation fauna, Tetonius had a rather large cranium. There are endocasts of the brain of T. homunculus, despite the skull not having large portions of the basiocciput. The endocasts find that T. homunculus had the largest olfactory bulbs compared to brain size of any living primate, with the ratio in size between the length of the olfactory bulb and maximum cerebrum length is 1:3.9 (compared to the 1:5.3 of Microcebus murinus). Inversely, the size of the frontal lobes is smaller relative to the rest of the cerebrum than in any other living primate, other than some tarsiers. Similar to other primates, T. homunculus had enlarged occipital and temporal lobes.

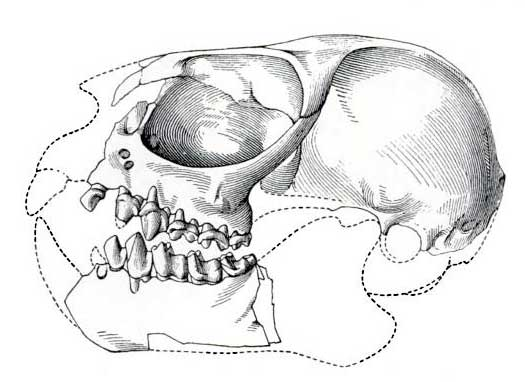
Historical reconstruction of the skull of T. homunculus, from Matthew and Granger (1915)

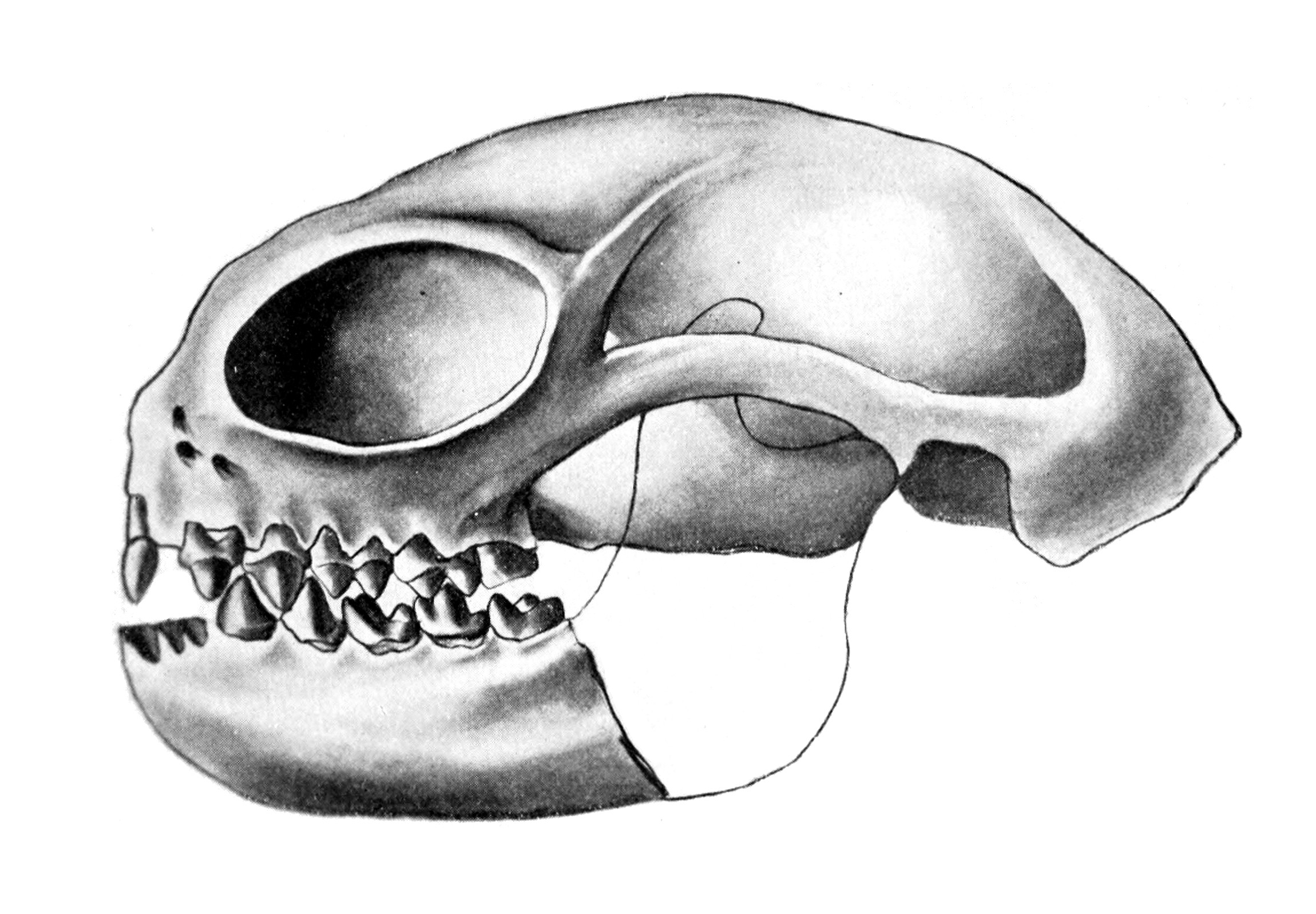
Historical reconstruction of the skull of T. homunculus, from Hubrecht (1897)

=== Mandible ===
Mandibles are known from every species of Tetonius, though for T. mckennai and T. matthewi they are not described in detail. The mandible of T. homunculus is v-shaped, and the symphysis was unfused and large. The upper ramus of the mandible is not known from any specimens of T. homunculus. In T. varleyorum, the mandible has been compared to T. matthewi in terms of depth. The widest part of the mandible is the symphysial region, which is unfused as in T. homunculus. Behind the symphysis, there is a pit which is assumed an attachment site for the genioglossus muscle. The mental foramen is positioned beneath the canine, though there is an accessory foramen below the fourth premolar.

=== Dentition ===
The dental formula of Tetonius is variable depending on the species, with T. mckennai and T. matthewi having a formula of 2,1,3,32,1,3,3 × 2 = 36, T. varleyorum having a formula of 2,1,2,32,1,2,3 × 2 = 34, and T. homunculus varying between 2,1,3,32,1,3,3 × 2 = 36 and 2,1,2,32,1,2,3 × 2 = 34. Historically, it had been assumed that T. homunculus lacked lower incisors, though this was based on a incomplete jaw.

Mandible of T. varleyorum, showing dentition

Generally, the lower incisors of Tetonius overlap with each other, with the medial two being enlarged. These medial two lower incisors also have prominent cingulids and low crowns, with there being a cutting edge on the distal end of the crown of the tooth. The upper medial pair of incisors are similarly large and broad, and has its own prominent cutting edges. The second lower incisor is comparatively smaller and has a cutting edge which is positioned vertically (as opposed to the distal cutting edges of the other incisors). T. varleyorum has smaller lower incisors which are smaller than those in T. mckennai and are similar to those of T. matthewi and Pseudotetonius ambiguus. Both T. matthewi and T. mckennai have more procumbent (forward pushing) first lower incisors than those of T. varleyorum. The canine teeth of Tetonius are relatively small. In T. varleyorum, the anatomy of the lower canine is similar to those of the premolars, and is less procumbent than the incisors.

As in all primates, Tetonius did not have a first premolar. The second lower premolar was absent in T. varleyorum, and in T. homunculus the upper second premolar is small. It is unknown if the second lower premolar was present in T. homunculus. T. matthewi and T. mckennai retain the lower second premolar, though it is reduced and even absent in some individuals. The lower third and fourth premolars of Tetonius are large, and in T. mckennai the fourth lower premolar is tall and elongated compared to those of Teilhardina, another omomyid primate. The molars of Tetonius are, generally, large and broad. In T. varleyorum, the upper second molar is the largest of the molars.

== Evolution ==
Tetonius evolved into the genus Pseudotetonius, with the width of its P_{4} evolving neutrally due to genetic drift rather than selection, while stabilising selection governed the changes in the width and length of the other cheek teeth.
