= Trogolemur =

Trogolemur Temporal range: Eocene–Eocene

Scientific classification
- Kingdom: Animalia
- Phylum: Chordata
- Class: Mammalia
- Order: Primates
- Family: †Omomyidae
- Subfamily: †Anaptomorphinae
- Genus: †Trogolemur; Matthew, 1909

Species
- T. amplior (Beard et al. 1992); T.fragilis (Beard et al. 1992); T.myodes (Matthew 1909)

Extinct genus of primates

Trogolemur is a genus of omomyid primate from Eocene North America.

== Description ==
Trogolemur has been compared to Strigorhysis, another omomyid, in dentition. The second molar is broader than the first or the third, being more rectangular in shape. The second molar also bears an enlarged protocone lobe, indicating enhanced chewing capabilities. Trogolemur is thought to be small, weighing less than 50 g (0.11 lb). The similarity between Tatmanius and Trogolemur has caused Trogolemur to be placed close with derived anaptomorphines, though this is disputed. The dental formula of the genus is 1-2,1,3-4,1-2-31-2,1,3-4,1-2-3.

== Paleoecology ==
Trogolemur shared its environment with many other species of omomyid primate, including Omomys and Macrotarsius. It is likely some form of niche partitioning was occurring amongst all these species, as studies on the shearing potential of the lower molars of various anaptomorphines show varied diets.
