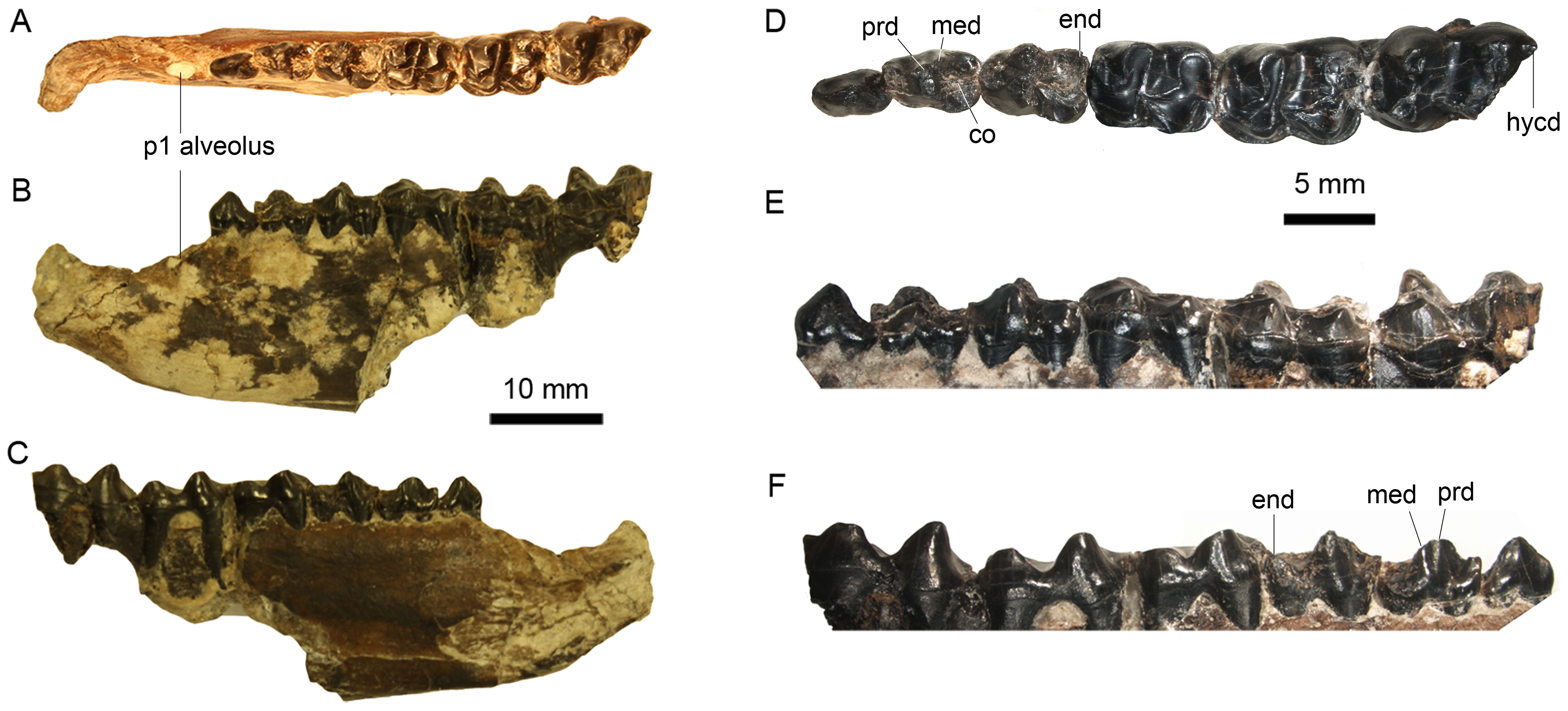

Scientific classification
- Kingdom: Animalia
- Phylum: Chordata
- Class: Mammalia
- Infraclass: Placentalia
- Order: Perissodactyla
- Family: †Isectolophidae
- Genus: †Meridiolophus; Bai et al. 2014

Species
- M. expansus

= Meridiolophus =

Meridiolophus Temporal range: Early Eocene

Meridiolophus is an extinct genus of basal tapiromorph that inhabited China during the Early Eocene. It is a monotypic genus that contains the species M. expansus.
