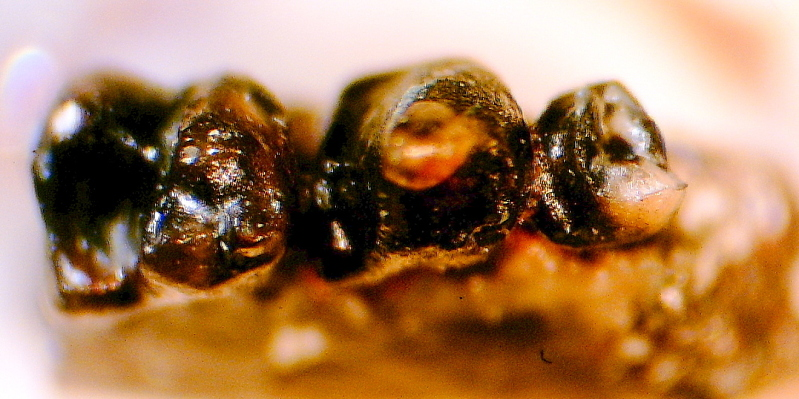
- Dentition of T. szalayi

Scientific classification
- Kingdom: Animalia
- Phylum: Chordata
- Class: Mammalia
- Order: Primates
- Suborder: Haplorhini
- Family: †Omomyidae
- Subfamily: †Anaptomorphinae
- Genus: †Tatmanius; Brown and Rose, 1991

Species
- T. szalayi (Brown and Rose, 1991)

= Tatmanius =

Tatmanius Temporal range: Early Eocene–Early Eocene

Extinct omomyid primate

Tatmanius is a genus of omomyid primate from Eocene North America.

== Description ==
Tatmanius was rather derived, having similar dentition to Trogolemur. Tatmanius lacks a second premolar, much like the related Pseudotetonius. The third premolar was also small compared to other anaptomorphines, and the fourth bore a bilobed root. It is speculated that Tatmanius descended from Pseudotetonius, as they share remarkable similarity in dentition.
