= Isectolophidae =

Isectolophidae Temporal range: Eocene

Scientific classification
- Kingdom: Animalia
- Phylum: Chordata
- Class: Mammalia
- Infraclass: Placentalia
- Order: Perissodactyla
- Clade: Tapiromorpha
- Family: †Isectolophidae

Subgroups
- Aulaxolophus; Cardiolophus; Chowliia; Gandheralophus; Homogalax; Isectolophus; Kalakotia; Karagalax; Meridiolophus; Orientolophus; Sastrilophus

Extinct family of mammals

Isectolophidae is a possibly paraphyletic extinct family of browsing, herbivorous, mammals in the order Perissodactyla.

Isectolophidae has been interpreted as a family within Tapiroidea, or as a sister group to the rest of the Tapiromorpha, which includes the Ancylopoda (lophiodontids and Chalicotherioidea) and the Ceratomorpha (tapirs, rhinoceroses and their extinct relatives).
