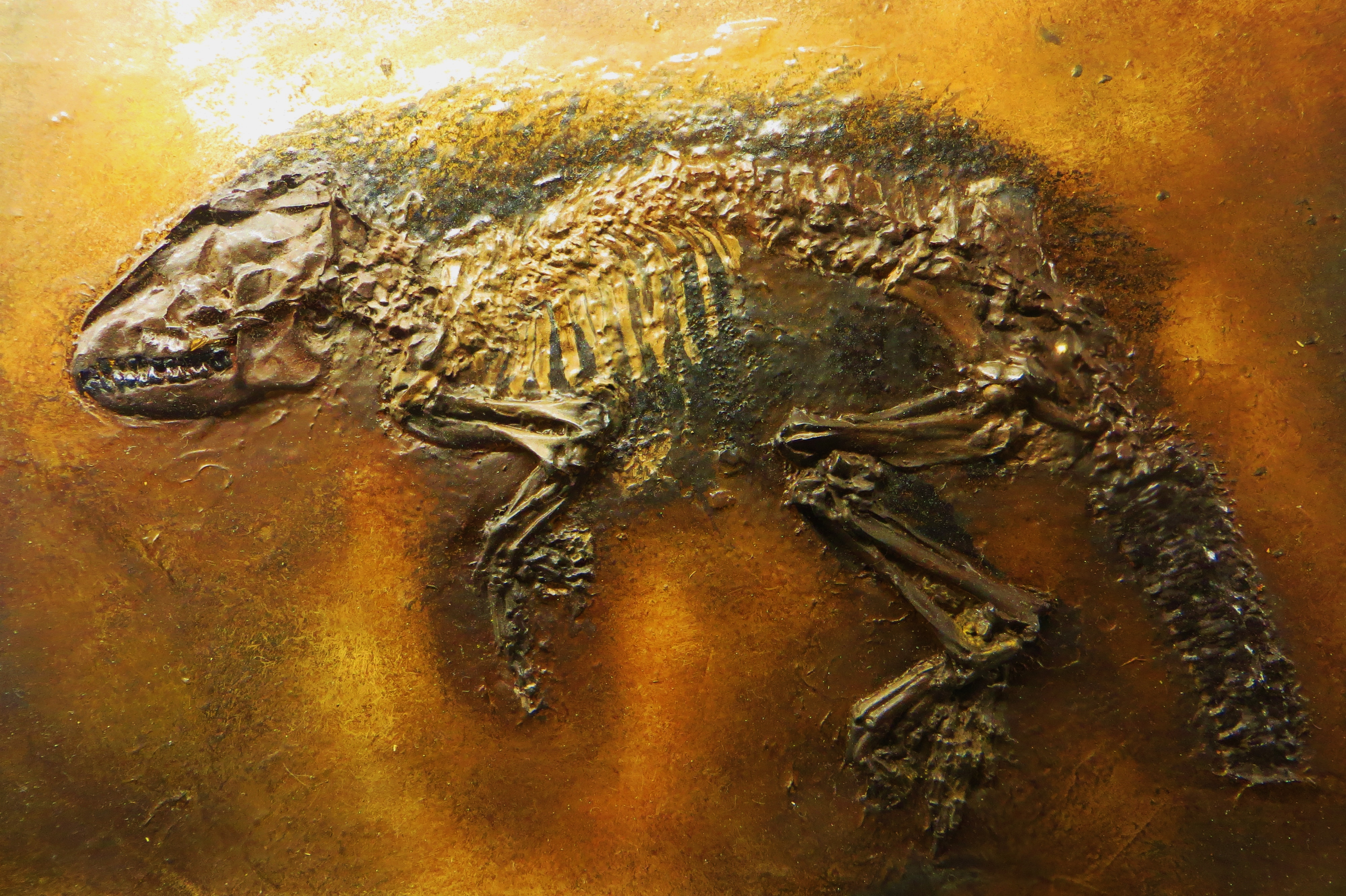
- Pholidocercus hassiacus fossil at Museum of Paleontology, Tübingen

Scientific classification
- Kingdom: Animalia
- Phylum: Chordata
- Class: Mammalia
- Infraclass: Placentalia
- Order: Eulipotyphla
- Family: †Amphilemuridae; Hill, 1953

Synonyms
- Dormaaliidae Quinet 1964

= Amphilemuridae =

Amphilemuridae Temporal range: Eocene

Extinct family of mammals

The Amphilemuridae are a family of extinct mammals belonging to the order Eulipotyphla, from the Eocene of Europe and North America.

== Description ==
Amphilemurids were generally small in size and may have resembled moonrats in life. Some species had spines like those of hedgehogs, while others were almost free of spines or had bristly coats. Most species are known only from teeth.

== Classification ==
The family Amphilemuridae was first described in 1953 by Hill, and was included in the order Insectivora, which later proved to be polyphyletic. Currently the amphilemurids are considered basal members of the order Eulipotyphla, although Hooker and Russell (2012) considered them to belong to the order Macroscelidea.

=== Taxonomy ===
Family †Amphilemuridae Hill, 1953

- Subfamily †Placentidentinae D. E. Russell et al., 1973
  - †Placentidens Russell & Savage 1973
    - †Placentidens lotus Russell & Savage 1973
- Subfamily †Amphilemurinae Hill, 1953
  - †Macrocranion Weitzel, 1949
    - †Macrocranion junnei Smith, Bloch, Strait & Gingerich, 2002
    - †Macrocranion nitens Matthew, 1918
    - †Macrocranion robinsoni Krishtalka & Setoguchi, 1977
    - †Macrocranion vandebroekiQuinet, 1964
    - †Macrocranion germonpreae Smith, 1997
    - †Macrocranion tenerum Tobien, 1962
    - †Macrocranion tupaiodon Weitzel, 1949
    - †Macrocranion huerzeleri Maitre, Escarguel & Sigé, 2006
    - †Macrocranion storchi Maitre, Escarguel & Sigé, 2006
    - †Macrocranion sudrei Maitre, Escarguel & Sigé, 2006
  - †Amphilemur Heller 1935
    - †Amphilemur eocaenicus Heller, 1935
    - †Amphilemur peyeri Hürzeler, 1946
    - †Amphilemur oltinus Maitre, Escarguel & Sigé, 2006
  - †Pholidocercus von Koenigswald & Storch, 1983
    - †Pholidocercus hassiacus von Koenigswald & Storch, 1983
  - †Gesneropithex Hürzeler 1946
    - †Gesneropithex figularis Hürzeler, 1946
    - †Gesneropithex grisollensis Norris & Harrison, 1998
  - †Alsaticopithecus Hürzeler 1947
    - †Alsaticopithecus leemani Hürzeler 1947
  - †Echinolestes Maitre, Escarguel & Sigé, 2006
    - †Echinolestes quercyi Maitre, Escarguel e Sigé, 2006

== Bibliography ==
- Maitre, Élodie; Escarguel, Gilles; Sigé, Bernard (2006). "Amphilemuridae (Lipotyphla, Mammalia) éocènes d'Europe occidentale : Nouvelles données taxonomiques". Comptes Rendus Palevol. 5 (6): 813–820. doi:10.1016/j.crpv.2006.01.005.
- Dunn, Rachel H.; Rasmussen, D. Tab (2009). "Skeletal Morphology of a New Genus of Eocene Insectivore (Mammalia, Erinaceomorpha) from Utah". Journal of Mammalogy. 90 (2): 321–331. doi:10.1644/08-MAMM-A-084.1. S2CID 86159414.
