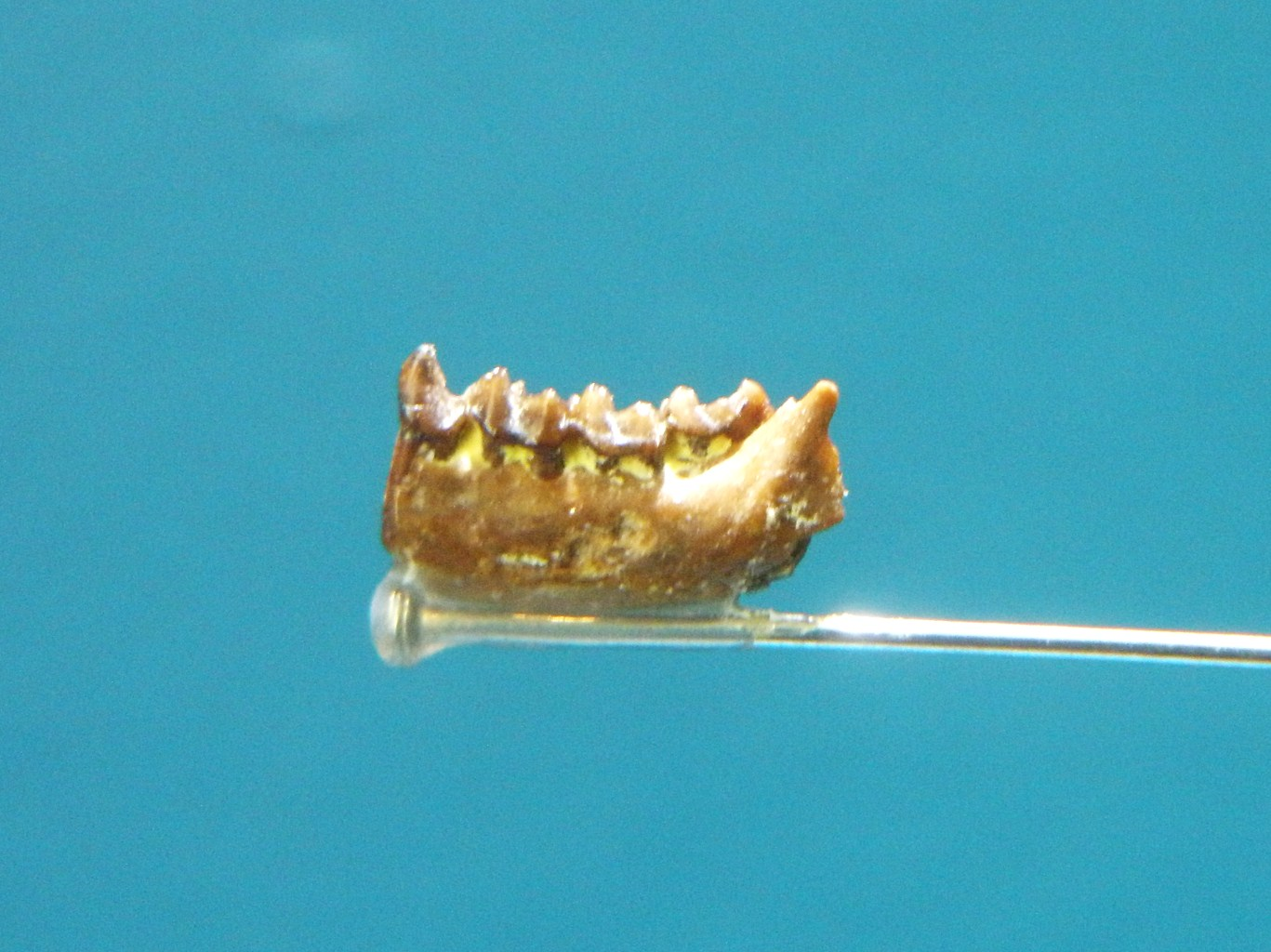
- Teilhardina belgica

Scientific classification
- Kingdom: Animalia
- Phylum: Chordata
- Class: Mammalia
- Order: Primates
- Family: †Omomyidae
- Subfamily: †Anaptomorphinae
- Tribe: †Anaptomorphini
- Genus: †Teilhardina; Simpson, 1940

Species
- †Teilhardina belgica (Teilhard de Chardin, 1927) (type); †Teilhardina brandti Gingerich, 1993; †Teilhardina demissa Rose, 1995; †Teilhardina tenuicula (Jepsen, 1930); †Teilhardina asiatica Ni, Wang, Hu, and Li, 2004; †Teilhardina magnoliana Beard, 2008

= Teilhardina =

Teilhardina Temporal range: 56–47 Ma Early Eocene - Middle Eocene

Genus of 'dry nosed' primates

Teilhardina (/taɪhɑːrˈdiːnə/, teye-har-DEE-nuh) is an extinct marmoset-like omomyid primate that lived in Europe, North America and Asia during the Early Eocene epoch, about 56 to 47 million years ago. The paleontologist George Gaylord Simpson named it after the French paleontologist, Jesuit and philosopher Teilhard de Chardin.

== Paleobiology ==
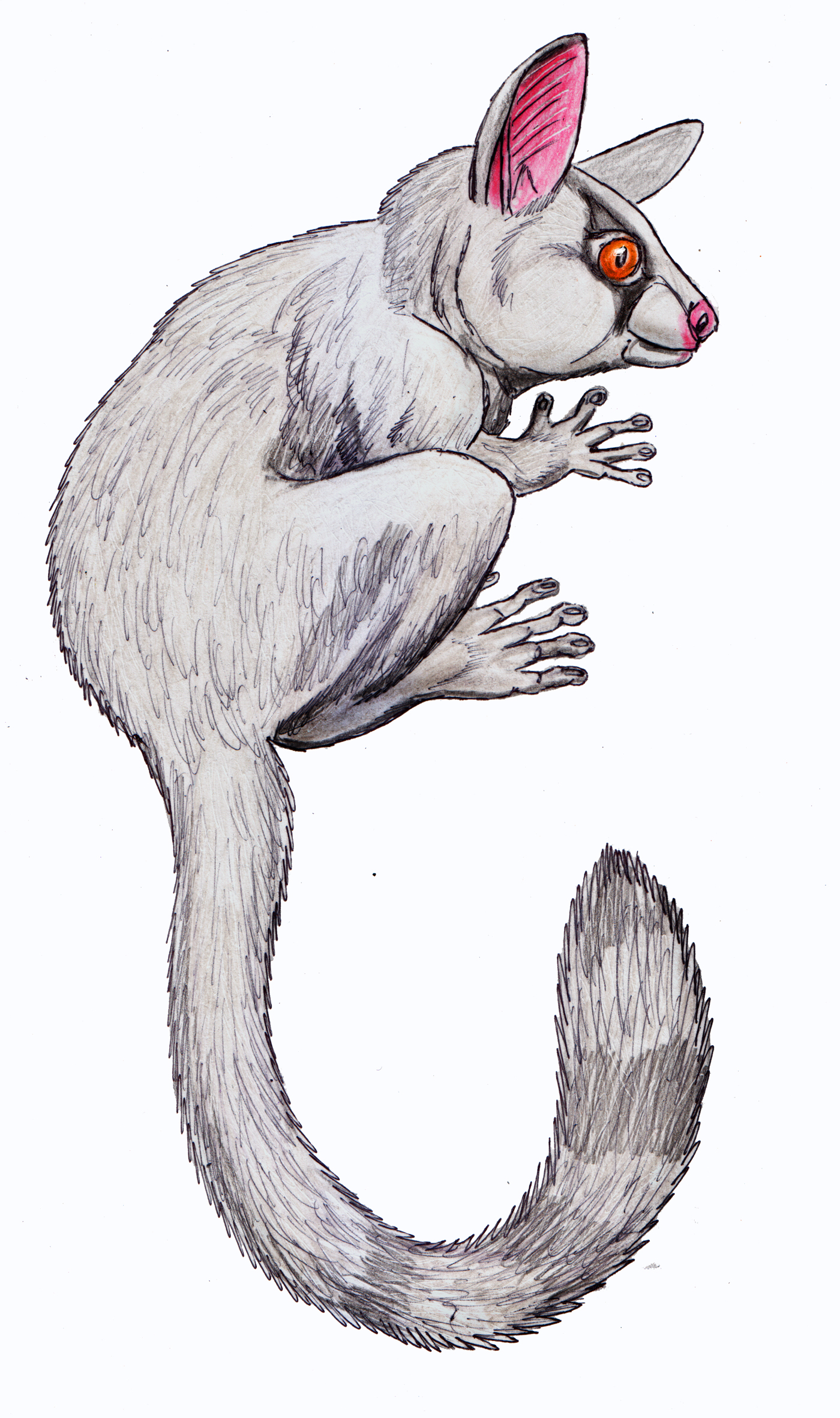
Restoration

Carbon isotope excursion suggests that the Asian Teilhardina asiatica is the oldest member of the genus; the youngest is the North American Teilhardina brandti. However finds in Wyoming suggest Teilhardina may have originated in North America.

There are four hypotheses that have been proposed to try and explain the geographic distribution:

1. Africa was the origination of the primates and then they dispersed to Europe, Greenland and finally North America.
2. Primates originated in North America then dispersed to Asia through the Bering route and later passed through Greenland to finally reach Europe.
3. Primates originated in Asia or Africa and dispersed through North America and finally reaching western Europe.
4. Asia was the primate’s origination, they then dispersed eastward towards North America and westward to Europe.

At one point a hypothesis arose that the primates may have originated in India prior to the plate collision with Asia near the Paleocene–Eocene boundary and they spread into Asia afterwards.

These hypotheses were re-evaluated using new morphological evidence and earliest records of Teilhardina species from the continents concerned. The researchers concluded that none of the hypotheses fit the pattern that had emerged from their studies. It is now believed that at the beginning of the Paleocene–Eocene Thermal Maximum Teilhardina dispersed from east to west. The earliest primates migrated across the Turgai Straits from South Asia to Europe, finally dispersing to North America through Greenland.

== Taxonomy ==
Although Teilhardina has been usually assigned to Omomyidae, it has also been recovered as polyphyletic, with T. belgica and T. asiatica nested as the basalmost haplorrhines, and others being recovered as anaptomorphine omomyids (and thus more closely related to tarsiers than to simians). T. crassidens has been referred to the genus Baataromomys, but has also been assigned to the new genus Bownomomys along with T. americana.

== Species ==
Teilhardina magnoliana is the earliest known North American primate; its fossil was first discovered in the US state of Mississippi. It was a tree-dwelling fur-covered tiny creature with a long, slender tail; the tail was significantly longer than the body.

The discoverer, K. Christopher Beard of the Carnegie Museum of Natural History (Pittsburgh, Pennsylvania), posited that Teilhardina magnoliana's ancestors crossed the land bridge from Siberia to the Americas, possibly more than 55.8 million years ago, although the age of the discovered fossil is a matter of disagreement. The animal weighed approximately one ounce (28 g).
