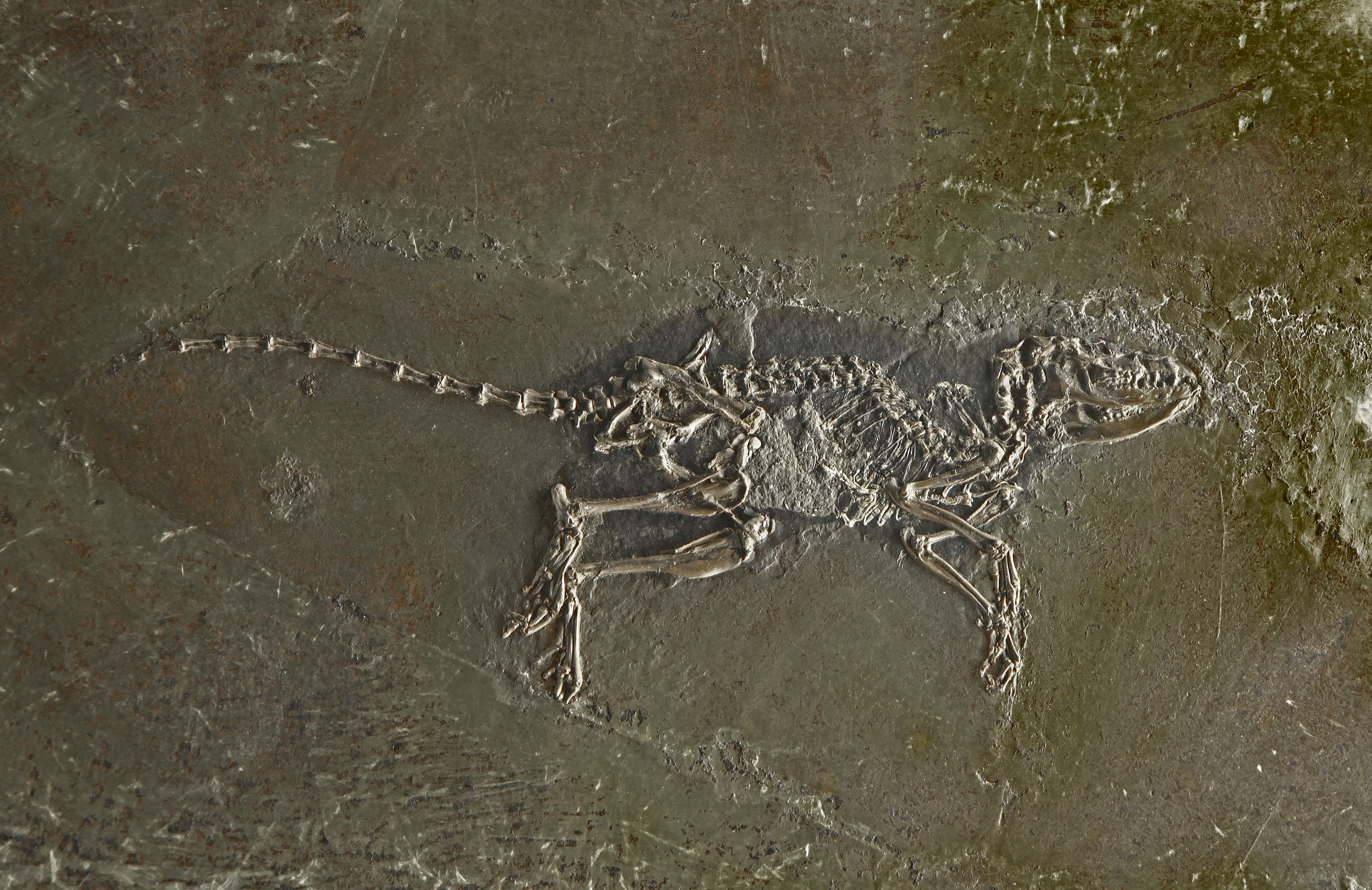
- M. tupaiodon in Staatliches Museum, Germany

Scientific classification
- Kingdom: Animalia
- Phylum: Chordata
- Class: Mammalia
- Order: Eulipotyphla
- Family: †Amphilemuridae
- Genus: †Macrocranion; Weitzel, 1949

Species
- M. germonpreae Smith, 1997; M. junnei Smith et al., 2002; M. nitens (Matthew, 1918); M. robinsoni (Krishtalka and Setoguchi, 1977); M. tenerum Tobien, 1962; M. tupaiodon Weitzel, 1949; M. vandebroeki (Quinet, 1964)

Synonyms
- Aculeodens Weitzel, 1949; Dormaalius Quinet, 1964

= Macrocranion =

Macrocranion Temporal range: Early Eocene

Extinct genus of mammals

Macrocranion is a genus of extinct mammal from the Eocene epoch of Europe and North America. Exceptional fossils have been found in the Messel Pit of Germany. Macrocranion species are often described as forest-floor predators, about the size of small squirrels but with longer limbs. The genus is represented at the Messel Pit site by two species, M. tupaidon and M. tenerum.

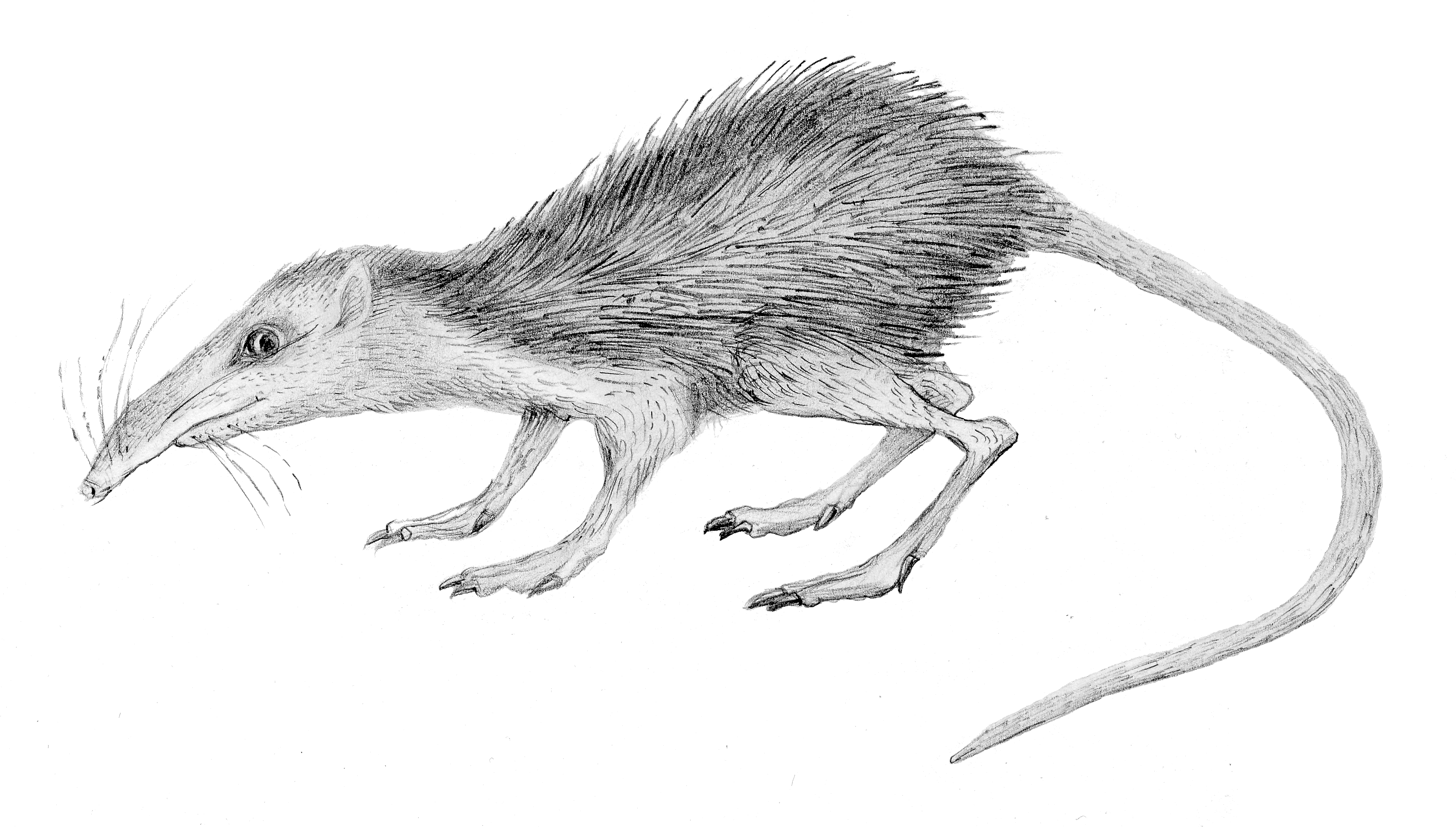
Restoration of M. tenerum

M. tupaiodon had woolly fur with no spikes. Although possibly an omnivore, fossil remains indicate the specimen had eaten fish near the time of its death. This small animal was approximately fifteen cm in length, with long back legs capable of considerable speed.

The fossil of M. tenerum is five cm long. The species also had long legs for rapid movement, but its fur included a spiky protection. The long legs, however, indicate the animal could not have effectively rolled up for defense. Fossilized stomach remains show that M. tenerum's diet included ants, so it may have been an insectivore.

The oldest species are M. vandebroeki from the Paleocene-Eocene transition of Northern Europe and M. junnei from the Wasatchian (Early Eocene) of Wyoming.
