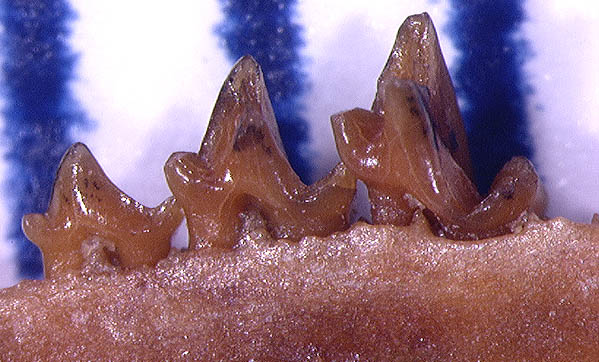
- Teeth

Scientific classification
- Domain: Eukaryota
- Kingdom: Animalia
- Phylum: Chordata
- Class: Mammalia
- Order: Eulipotyphla
- Family: †Geolabididae
- Genus: †Batodonoides; Novacek, 1976

Species
- Batodonoides powayensis Novacek, 1976 (type); Batodonoides vanhouteni Bloch et al. 1998; Batodonoides walshi Kelly 2010; Batodonoides rileyi Kelly 2013

= Batodonoides =

Batodonoides Temporal range: Eocene, 55.4–42 Ma

Extinct genus of mammals

Batodonoides (often misspelled as Batonoides) is a genus of extinct shrew-like mammals, which includes a species that is possibly the smallest mammal to have ever lived. Species of Batodonoides lived about 42 to 53 million years ago during the early to middle Eocene Epoch in North America. The genus contains four species: the type species B. powayensis, the older B. vanhouteni, B. walshi and B. rileyi.

== Species ==
=== Batodonoides powayensis ===
Batodonoides powayensis is based on the type specimen UCMP V-96459, and was a ground dwelling insectivore. This species is younger than its counterpart, B. vanhouteni, existing between approximately 46.2 to 42 million years ago. It is based on fossilised remains recovered from California, USA.

=== Batodonoides vanhouteni ===
Based on the size of its molar teeth, it is estimated that Batodonoides vanhouteni may have weighed only 0.93-1.82 grams (with 1.3 g most likely). The species lived about 53 million years ago during the early Eocene Epoch in North America.

Batodonoides vanhouteni, described in 1998 by Bloch and colleagues, is the oldest species, and was discovered in Wasatchian deposits in Wyoming, USA. It is based on a juvenile specimen, consisting of a mandible and some teeth.
