= Medioolithus =

Medioolithus Temporal range: Early Eocene

Egg fossil classification
- Basic shell type: Ornithoid
- Morphotype: Ornithoid-ratite
- Oofamily: †Medioolithidae
- Oogenus: †Medioolithus; Kohring & Hirsch, 1996

Oospecies
- M. geiseltalensis

Medioolithus is an oogenus of fossil egg laid by a paleognath.

== Description ==
Medioolithus is known several eggshell fragments, and one complete, spherical egg. M. geiseltalensis is very similar to modern ratite eggs, for example those of ostriches, rheas, and cassowaries. At 9 cm (3.5 in) in diameter, however, it is smaller than the eggs of any of these birds, being more similar in size to the egg of a kiwi.
