= Baataromomys =

Baataromomys Temporal range: Ypresian

Scientific classification
- Kingdom: Animalia
- Phylum: Chordata
- Class: Mammalia
- Infraclass: Placentalia
- Order: Primates
- Family: †Omomyidae
- Genus: †Baataromomys
- Species: †B. ulaanus

Binomial name
- †Baataromomys ulaanus Ni et al., 2007

Baataromomys is an extinct genus of omomyid that lived during the Ypresian stage of the Eocene epoch.

== Distribution ==
Baataromomys ulaanus is known from the site of Wulanboerhe in Inner Mongolia, China.
