= Geolabididae =

Scientific classification
- Domain: Eukaryota
- Kingdom: Animalia
- Phylum: Chordata
- Class: Mammalia
- Order: Eulipotyphla
- Family: †Geolabididae; McKenna 1960

Genera
- Batodon; Batodonoides; Centetodon; Marsholestes; Stilpnodon

Synonyms
- Geolabidinae

Extinct family of mammals

Geolabididae is an extinct family of prehistoric mammals belonging to the order Eulipotyphla.

== Taxonomy ==
- Batodon (Sometimes placed in Cimolestidae)
  - Batodon tenuis Marsh, 1892 - Upper Cretaceous Campanian to Maastrichtian, Canada and United States.
- Batodonoides - Lower Eocene (Wasatchian) to Mid Eocene (Uintan) - North America
- Gobigeolabis Lopatin, 2004
  - Gobigeolabis verigranum Lopatin, 2004 - Upper Paleocene, Mongolia
- Centetodon Marsh, 1872 (incl. Geolabis) - Lower Eocene to Early Miocene
  - Centetodon aztecus Lillegraven et al. 1981
  - Centetodon bembicophagus Lillegraven et al. 1981
  - Centetodon bacchanalis (McGrew, 1959)
  - Centetodon chadronensis Lillegraven et al., 1981 -. Mid Eocene (Duchesnean) to Oligocene (Orellan)
  - Centetodon divaricatus Korth, 1992 - Upper Oligocene, North America
- Marsholestes - Middle Eocene, (Bridgerian)
  - Marsholestes dasypelix Matthew 1909
- Stilpnodon Simpson 1935
