= Metoolithus =

Metoolithus Temporal range: Chadronian

Egg fossil classification
- Kingdom: Animalia
- Phylum: Chordata
- Class: Aves
- Oogenus: †Metoolithus; Jackson, Varricchio & Corsini, 2013

Oospecies
- M. nebraskensis

Fossil found in Nebraska

Metoolithus is an oogenus of fossil bird egg from Nebraska. It is known from a single, near-complete egg, as well as several eggshell fragments. They are small, (60 mm x 44 mm) and spheroid. They show a mix of avian and non-avian characteristics.
