= 2003 in paleontology =

Paleontology or palaeontology is the study of prehistoric life forms on Earth through the examination of plant and animal fossils. This includes the study of body fossils, tracks (ichnites), burrows, cast-off parts, fossilised feces (coprolites), palynomorphs and chemical residues. Because humans have encountered fossils for millennia, paleontology has a long history both before and after becoming formalized as a science. This article records significant discoveries and events related to paleontology that occurred or were published in the year 2003.

== Plants ==
=== Conifers ===
Name	Novelty	Status	Authors	Age	Unit	Location	Notes	Images
Chamaecyparis eureka	Sp nov	Valid	Kotyk, Basinger, & McIlver	Lutetian	Buchanan Lake Formation, Axel Heiberg Island	Canada; Nunavut	the oldest confirmed species of Chamaecyparis	
Tsuga swedaea	Sp nov	Valid	LePage	Lutetian	Buchanan Lake Formation, Axel Heiberg Island	Canada; Nunavut	A hemlock species	

=== Angiosperms ===
Name	Novelty	Status	Authors	Age	Unit	Location	Notes	Images
Araripia florifera	Gen et sp	Valid	Mohr & Eklund	lower Cretaceous	Crato Formation	Brazil		
Carpinus perryae	Sp nov	Valid	Pigg, Manchester, & Wehr	Eocene; Ypresian	Okanagan Highlands; Klondike Mountain Formation	USA; Washington	A hornbeam	Carpinus parryae
Corylus johnsonii	Sp nov	Valid	Pigg, Manchester, & Wehr	Eocene; Ypresian	Okanagan Highlands; Klondike Mountain Formation	USA; Washington	A hazelnut	Corylus johnsonii
Palaeocarpinus barksdaleae	Sp nov	Valid	Pigg, Manchester, & Wehr	Eocene; Ypresian	Okanagan Highlands; Klondike Mountain Formation	USA; Washington	A betulaceous fruit	Palaeocarpinus barksdaleae
Palaeocarpinus dentatus	Comb nov	Valid	(Penhallow) Pigg, Manchester, & Wehr	Eocene; Ypresian	Okanagan Highlands "Stump lake", Coldwater Beds	Canada; British Columbia	A betulaceous fruit; moved from Carpolithes dentatus (1890)	
Palaeocarpinus stonebergae	Sp nov	Valid	Pigg, Manchester, & Wehr	Eocene; Ypresian	Okanagan Highlands; Allenby Formation	Canada; British Columbia	A betulaceous fruit	
Pseudosalix	Gen et sp nov	Valid	Boucher, Manchester, & Judd	latest Ypresian	Green River Formation	USA; Utah	A willow relative	

=== Gnetophytes ===
Name	Novelty	Status	Authors	Age	Unit	Location	Notes	Images
Cratonia cotyledon	Gen et sp nov	Valid	Rydin, Mohr, & Friis	lower Cretaceous	Crato Formation	Brazil	A relative to Welwetschia	

== Fungi ==
Name	Novelty	Status	Authors	Age	Unit	Location	Notes	Images
Aureofungus	Get et sp nov	Valid	Hibbett et al	Burdigalian	Dominican amber.	Dominican Republic	An agaricalean fungus Type species A. yaniguaensis	

== Arthropods ==
=== Arachnids ===
Name	Novelty	Status	Authors	Age	Unit	Location	Notes	Images
Cornupalpatum	Gen et sp nov	valid	Poinar & Brown	Albian-Cenomanian	Burmese amber	Myanmar	An Ixodid hard tick	Cornupalpatum burmanicum

=== Crustaceans ===
Name	Novelty	Status	Authors	Age	Unit	Location	Notes	Images
Cypris silveirinhaensis	Sp nov	Valid	Colin & Antunes	Ypresian	Silveirinha Formation	Portugal	An ostracod	
Ilyocypris lusitanicus	Sp nov	Valid	Colin & Antunes	Ypresian	Silveirinha Formation	Portugal	An ostracod	

=== Insects ===
Name	Novelty	Status	Authors	Age	Unit	Location	Notes	Images
Archimyrmex piatnitzkyi	Comb nov.	vaild	(Viana & Haedo Rossi)	Middle Eocene	Ventana Formation	Brazil	A myrmeciine ant. moved from Ameghinoia piatnitzkyi (1957)	Archimyrmex piatnitzkyi
Archimyrmex smekali	Comb nov.	valid	(Rossi de Garcia)	Middle Eocene	Ventana Formation	Brazil	A myrmeciine ant. moved from Polanskiella smekali (1983)	
Brownimeciinae	Subfam. Gen. et Sp. nov	Valid	Bolton	Turonian	New Jersey amber	USA; New Jersey	A stem group ant, type species B. clavata	Brownimecia clavata
Halictus? savenyei	Sp. nov	valid	Engel & Archibald	Ypresian	Coldwater Beds	Canada; British Columbia	first apoid bee fossil described from Canada	
Lasioglossum celinae	Sp. nov	Valid	Nel & Petrulevicius	Rupelian	Dauphin	France	A sweat bee	Lasioglossum celinae
Oligoapis	Gen et sp nov	Jr synonym	Nel & Petrulevicius	Aquitanian	Bes-Konak	Turkey	An apine bee, type species O. beskonakensis Moved to Bombus beskonakensis in 2019	Bombus beskonakensis
Palaeopsychops dodgeorum	Sp nov	valid	Makarkin & Archibald	Ypresian	Coldwater Beds	Canada; British Columbia	An ithionid giant lacewing	
Paraelectrobombus	Gen et sp nov	Jr synonym	Nel & Petrulevicius	Aquitanian	Bes-Konak	Turkey	Described as an Electrobombini bee type species P. patriciae Moved to Bombus (Paraelectrobombus) patriciae in (2019)	Bombus (Paraelectrobombus) patriciae
Raphidia funerata	sp nov	synonym	Engel	Priabonian	Florissant Formation	USA; Colorado	A snakefly. moved to Florissantoraphidia funerata in 2014	
Wesmaelius mathewesi	Sp. nov	valid	Engel & Archibald	Ypresian	Coldwater beds, Princeton Group	Canada (British Columbia)	A Hemerobiinae lacewing	
Xylocopa celineae	Sp nov	valid	Nel & Petrulevicius	Chattian	Camoins-les-Bains	France	A carpenter bee	Xylocopa celineae

== Molluscs ==
=== Gastropods ===
Name	Novelty	Status	Authors	Age	Unit	Location	Notes	Images
Bithynia soaresi	Sp nov	Valid	Callapez	Early Eocene	Silveirinha Formation	Portugal	A bithyniid	
Gyraulus antunesi	Sp nov	Valid	Callapez	Early Eocene	Silveirinha Formation	Portugal	A planorbid	

== Conodont paleozoology ==
German paleontologist and stratigrapher Heinz Walter Kozur (1942-2013) described the conodont genus Carnepigondolella.

== Vertebrate paleozoology ==
=== Parareptiles ===
Name	Novelty	Status	Authors	Age	Unit	Location	Notes	Images
Bunostegos		Valid	Sidor			Niger	This was one of the largest herbivores of their time	Bunostegos

=== Non-avian dinosaurs ===
Data courtesy of George Olshevsky's dinosaur genera list.

Name	Status	Authors	Location	Notes	Images
"Abdallahsaurus"	Nomen nudum.	Gerhard Maier		Nomen nudum; possibly a junior synonym of Giraffatitan or Brachiosaurus	
"Blancocerosaurus"	Nomen nudum.	Gerhard Maier		Nomen nudum; possibly a junior synonym of Giraffatitan or Brachiosaurus	
Amazonsaurus	Valid taxon	Carvalho; Avilla; Salgado	Brazil		
Antetonitrus	Valid taxon	Yates; Kitching	South Africa		
Aviatyrannis	Valid taxon	Rauhut	Portugal		
Bainoceratops	Valid taxon	Tereschenko; Alifanov	China		
Brohisaurus	Valid taxon	Malkani	Pakistan		
Colepiocephale	Valid taxon	Sullivan	Canada		
"Domeykosaurus"	Nomen nudum	Rubilar-Rogers and Vargas vide: Anonymous on May 29, 2003 Reuters news reports.	Chile		
Dromaeosauroides	Valid taxon	Christiansen; Bonde	Denmark		Dromaeosauroides
Equijubus	Valid taxon	You; Luo; Shubin; Witmer; Tang Z.; Tang F.	China		
Ferganasaurus	Valid taxon	Alifanov; Averianov	Kyrgyzstan		
Fukuisaurus	Valid taxon	Kobayashi; Azuma	Japan		
Gobititan	Valid taxon	You; Tang F.; Luo	China		
Hanssuesia	Valid taxon	Sullivan	Canada (Alberta)		Hanssuesia
Heyuannia	Valid taxon	Lü	China		Heyuannia
Hongshanosaurus	Valid taxon	You; Xu X.; Wang X.	China		Hongshanosaurus
Isisaurus	Valid taxon	Jeffrey A. Wilson.; Upchurch	India		Isisaurus
"Issasaurus"		Gerhard Maier		Nomen nudum; possibly a junior synonym of Dicraeosaurus	
Lamaceratops	Valid taxon	Alifanov	China		
"Ligomasaurus"		Gerhard Maier		Nomen nudum; possibly a junior synonym of Giraffatitan or Brachiosaurus	
Lusotitan	Valid taxon	Antunes; Mateus	Portugal		
Magnirostris	Valid taxon	You; Dong Zhiming	China		Magnirostris
Mendozasaurus	Valid taxon	González-Riga (as González Riga)	Argentina		
"Mohammadisaurus"	Nomen nudum.	Gerhard Maier		Nomen nudum; possibly a junior synonym of Tornieria	
"Mtapaiasaurus"	Nomen nudum.	Gerhard Maier		Nomen nudum; possibly a junior synonym of Giraffatitan or Brachiosaurus	
"Mtotosaurus"	Nomen nudum.	Gerhard Maier		Nomen nudum; possibly a junior synonym of Dicraeosaurus	
"Nteregosaurus"	Nomen nudum.	Gerhard Maier		Nomen nudum; possibly a junior synonym of Janenschia	
"Nyororosaurus"		Gerhard Maier		Nomen nudum; possibly a junior synonym of Dicraeosaurus	
Olorotitan	Valid taxon	Godefroit; Bolotsky; Alifanov	Russia		Olorotitan Olorotitan
Platyceratops	Valid taxon	Alifanov	Mongolia		
Rajasaurus	Valid taxon	Jeffrey A. Wilson.; Sereno; Srivastava; Bhatt; Khosla; Sahni	India		Rajasaurus
Rinconsaurus	Valid taxon	Calvo; González-Riga (as González Riga)	Argentina		Rinconsaurus
"Salimosaurus"	Nomen nudum.	Gerhard Maier		Nomen nudum; possibly a junior synonym of Giraffatitan or Brachiosaurus	
"Selimanosaurus"	Nomen nudum.	Gerhard Maier		Nomen nudum; possibly a junior synonym of Dicraeosaurus	
Serendipaceratops	Valid taxon	T. Rich; Vickers-Rich	Australia		
Shenzhousaurus	Valid taxon	Ji Q.; Mark Norell; Makovicky; Gao K.; Ji S.; Yuan	China		
Shuangmiaosaurus	Valid taxon	You; Ji Q.; Li J.; Li Y. X.	China		
Silesaurus	Valid taxon	Dzik	Poland		Silesaurus
Sinornithomimus	Valid taxon	Kobayashi; Lü	China		Sinornithomimus
Sphaerotholus	Possible junior synonym of Prenocephale	Williamson; Carr			
"Wangonisaurus"	Nomen nudum.	Gerhard Maier		Nomen nudum; possibly a junior synonym of Giraffatitan or Brachiosaurus	
Yixianosaurus	Valid taxon	Xu X.; Wang X.	China		
Zalmoxes	Valid taxon	Weishampel; Jianu; Csiki; Norman	Romania		Zalmoxes
Zupaysaurus	Valid taxon	Arcucci & Coria	Argentina		Zupaysaurus

=== Newly named birds ===
Name	Status	Novelty	Authors	Age	Unit	Location	Notes	Images
Amanuensis pickfordi	Gen. et sp. nov	valid	Cécile Mourer-Chauviré	Middle Miocene	MN 4	Namibia	A Sagittariidae, relative of the secretarybird. The type species of Amanuensis Mourer-Chauviré, 2003.	
Amitabha urbsinterdictensis	Valid	Gen. nov. et Sp. nov.	Bonnie E. Gulas-Wroblewski Anton F.-J. Wroblewski	Middle Eocene	Bridger Formation	USA: Wyoming	The type species of Amitabha Gulas-Wroblewski & Wroblewski, 2003. Placed in crown Galliformes, but only compared with Phasianidae, not with other Eocene birds from North America.	
Anhinga minuta	Valid	Sp. nov.	Herculano M. F. de Alvarenga Edson Guilherme	Late Miocene-Early Pliocene	Huayquerian-Montehermosian, Solimõas Formation	Brazil	An Anhingidae.	
Coenocorypha miratropica	Valid	Sp. nov.	Trevor H. Worthy	Holocene	Vitilevu	Fiji	A Scolopacidae.	
Diomedea tanakai	Valid	Sp. nov.	Paul G. Davis	Late Early Miocene	Oi Formation	Japan	A Diomedeidae.	
Eoeurypyga olsoni	Nomen Nudum	Thesis name.	Ilka Weidig	Early Eocene	Green River Formation	USA: Wyoming	A Eurypygidae.	
Falco umanskajae	Valid	Sp. nov.	Denis V. Sobolev	Pliocene	MN 16	Ukraine	A Falconidae.	
Gallicolumba leonpascoi	Valid	Sp. nov.	Trevor H. Worthy Graham M. Wragg	Late Pleistocene-Holocene	Henderson Island	Pitcairn	A Columbidae.	
Hemignathus vorpalis	Valid	Sp. nov.	Helen F. James Storrs L. Olson	Subresent	Hawaii	USA: Hawaii	A Fringillidae, Carduelinae, Drepanidini.	
Macranhinga ranzii	Valid	Sp. nov.	Herculano M. F. de Alvarenga Edson Guilherme	Late Miocene-Early Pliocene	Huayquerian-Montehermosian	Brazil	An Anhingidae.	
Milvago carbo	Valid	Sp. nov.	William Suárez Duque Storrs L. Olson	Quaternary, possibly Late Pleistocene or Early Holocene	Las Breas de San Felipe	Cuba	A Falconidae.	
Morus peruvianus	Valid	Sp. nov.	Marcelo Stucchi	Pliocene	Pisco Formation	Peru	A Sulidae.	
Namibiavis senutae	Gen. et sp. nov	valid	Cécile Mourer-Chauviré	Middle Miocene	MN 4	Namibia	Initially thought to be an Idiornithidae, Cariamiformes but in 2011 reinterpreted as an Opisthocomidae, a relative of the hoatzin. The type species of Namibiavis Mourer-Chauviré, 2003.	
Nycticorax olsoni	Valid	Sp. nov.	W. R. P. Bourne N. P. Ashmole K. E. L. Simmons	Subrecent	Ascension Island	Ascension Island	An Ardeidae.	
Palaeogrus mainburgensis	Valid	Sp. nov.	Ursula B. Göhlich	Early Middle Miocene (MN 5)	Upper Freshwater Molasse	Germany Bavaria	A Gruidae.	
Parargornis messelensis	Valid	Gen. nov et Sp. nov.	Gerald Mayr	Early Middle Eocene	Messel pit, MP 11	Germany Hessen	An Apodiformes, Cypselavidae Mourer-Chauviré, 2006.	
Shandongornis yinansis	Valid	Gen. nov et Sp. nov.	Hou Lianhai	Pliocene		China	A Phasianidae.	
Spheniscus chilensis	Valid	Sp. nov.	Steven D. Emslie Carlos Guerra Correa	Pliocene	Mejillones Formation	Chile	A Spheniscidae.	
Spheniscus megaramphus	Valid	Sp. nov.	Marcello Stucchi Mario Urbina Alfredo Giraldo	Late Miocene	Pisco Formation	Peru	A Spheniscidae.	
Sula magna	Valid	Sp. nov.	Marcello Stucchi	Late Miocene-Early Pliocene	Pisco Formation	Peru	A Sulidae.	
Sula sulita	Valid	Sp. nov.	Marcello Stucchi	Late Miocene-Early Pliocene	Pisco Formation	Peru	A Sulidae.	
Wyomingcypselus pohli	Nomen Nudum	Thesis name.	Ilka Weidig	Early Eocene	Green River Formation	USA: Wyoming	An Apodiformes.	

=== Plesiosaurs ===
Name	Status	Authors	Notes
Terminonatator	Valid	Sato	
Thililua	Valid	Bardet Suberbiola Jalil	

=== Pterosaurs ===
Name	Status	Authors	Notes
Beipiaopterus	Valid	Lü J.-C.	
Chaoyangopterus	Valid	Wang Zhou	
Harpactognathus	Valid	Carpenter Unwin et al.	
Jidapterus	Valid	Dong, Sun, & Wu,	
Liaoningopterus	Valid	Wang X.-L. and Zhou Z.-H	
Liaoningopteryx	Valid	Wang X. Zhao	
Ludodactylus	Valid	Frey, E., Martill Buchy, M	
Nurhachius	Valid	Wang Kellner et al.	
Phosphatodraco	Valid	Pereda-Suberbiola N. Bardet et al.	
Sinopterus	Valid	Wang, X. Zhou, Z	

=== Synapsids ===
==== Non-mammalian ====
Name	Status	Authors	Discovery year	Age	Unit	Location	Notes	Images
Archaeovenator	Valid	Reisz; Dilkes		Upper Carboniferous (Upper Pennsylvanian)	Hamilton Quarry	USA	a pelycosaur	
Brasilitherium	Valid	Bonaparte; Martinelli; Schultz; Rupert				Brazil		
Brasilodon	Valid	Bonaparte; Martinelli; Schultz; Rupert				Brazil		
Bullacephalus	Valid	Rubidge; Kitching				South Africa		
Colobodectes	Valid	Modesto; Rubidge; Visser; Welman		Upper/Middle Permian (Capitanian)	Abrahamskraal formation	South Africa	an anomodont	
Lanthanostegus	Valid	Modesto; Rubidge; Welman		Middle/Upper Permian (Capitanian)		South Africa	an anomodont; replacement name for Lanthanocephalus Modesto, Rubidge & Welman, 2002, preoccupied by the cnidarian genus Lanthanocephalus Williams & Starmer, 2000	
Santacruzodon	Valid	Abdala; Ribeiro				Brazil		
Xiyukannemeyeria	Valid	Liu; Li		Middle Triassic (Anisian)		China	an anomodont; new genus for "Parakannemeyeria" brevirostris	

==== Mammals ====
Name	Novelty	Status	Authors	Age	Unit	Location	Notes	Images
Caracal depereti	Sp nov	Disputed	Morales et al.	Pliocene		Spain	A Caracal. Boscaini et al. (2016) considered this species to be a junior synonym of Lynx issiodorensis.	
Guangxicyon	Gen. et sp. nov.	Valid	Zhai et al.	Eocene	Nadu Formation	China	An amphicyonid.	
Iridodon	Gen et sp nov	Valid	Morlo & Gunnell	Bridgerian	Wasatch Formation	United States	A limnocyonid hyaenodont. The type species is I. datzae.	
Kogolepithecus	Gen et sp nov	Valid	Pickford et al.	Miocene		Uganda	A catarrhine of uncertain affinity. The type species is K. morotoensis.	
Yuesthonyx	Gen. et sp. nov.	Valid	Tong, Wang & Fu	Paleocene	Dazhang Formation	China	A tillodont. The type species is Y. tingae.	
