= Dichomeris leptosaris =

Scientific classification
- Kingdom: Animalia
- Phylum: Arthropoda
- Class: Insecta
- Order: Lepidoptera
- Family: Gelechiidae
- Genus: Dichomeris
- Species: D. leptosaris

Binomial name
- Dichomeris leptosaris Meyrick, 1932

Species of moth

Dichomeris leptosaris is a moth in the family Gelechiidae. It was described by Edward Meyrick in 1932. It is found on the Japanese islands of Hokkaido and Honshu.

The length of the forewings is 7–7.2 mm (0.28–0.28 in). Adults are similar to Dichomeris acuminata, but the ground colour of the forewings is more reddish ochreous.

The larvae feed on Corylus heterophylla var. thunbergi, Corylus sieboldiana and Quercus mongolia var. grosseserrata.

Lepidoptera and Some Other Life Forms gives this name as a synonym of Dichomeris consertellus (Christoph, 1882).
