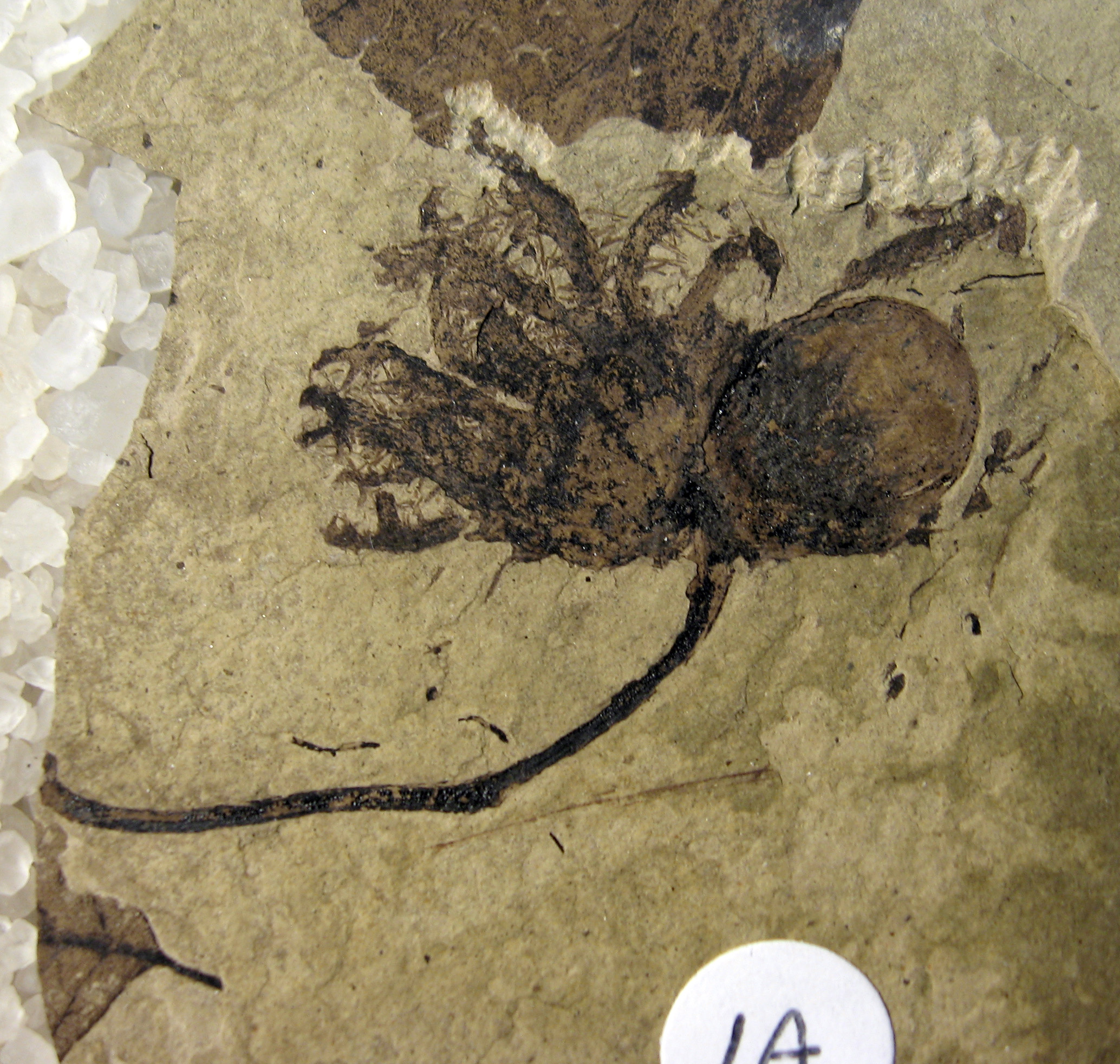
- Corylus johnsonii holotype specimen

Scientific classification
- Kingdom: Plantae
- Clade: Tracheophytes
- Clade: Angiosperms
- Clade: Eudicots
- Clade: Rosids
- Order: Fagales
- Family: Betulaceae
- Genus: Corylus
- Species: †C. johnsonii

Binomial name
- †Corylus johnsonii Pigg, Manchester, & Wehr

= Corylus johnsonii =

Corylus johnsonii Temporal range: Ypresian

Extinct species of flowering plant

Corylus johnsonii is an extinct species of hazel known from fossil fruits found in the Klondike Mountain Formation deposits of northern Washington state, dated to the early Eocene Ypresian stage (56 to 48 million years ago). Based on described features, C. johnsonii is the oldest definite species in the genus Corylus.

== Distribution and paleoenvironment ==
The description of this species by paleobotanists Kathleen Pigg, Steven Manchester, and Wesley Wehr was based on the study of thirty-four compression fossil specimens found at the UWBM sites B4131 and A0307, the latter being designated the type locality. The specimens are twelve infructescences with attached involucres containing nuts or nut casts, fourteen involucres, and eight isolated paired or single nuts. The holotype specimen is number "SR 98-01-02 A&B", an infructescence with involucre, and is housed in the Stonerose Interpretive Center in Republic, Washington. The species epithet johnsonii was coined in honor of Kirk R. Johnson for his continuing work on, and recognition of the importance of, the Republic Flora.

== Taxonomy ==
Though described as a single species, Pigg et al noted the wide grade of variation in the involucre morphology, ranging from simple to ones with extensive spines. The involucres also show a spectrum from thin, leafy lobes that display distinct veins to thick lobes with no distinct venation. As specimens of C johnsonii have a full morphology range between the three involucre types, the possibility of multiple species is hard to prove or disprove. However the authors chose to name a single species because of the continuous gradation present between the distinct morphologies.

Of the two sections into which the genus Corylus is divided, section Corylus and section Acanthochlamys, C. johnsonii is most similar to three species in the latter. Section Acanthochlamys is considered basal within the genus and the three species, Corylus ferox, C.wangii, and C. heterophylla are all native to southeast Asia. Infructescences of Corylus wangii, like those of C. johnsonii, possess narrow lobes with many unbranched and branched spines, while C. ferox-like infructescences have a highly spiny, prickly surface. Specimens within the simple end of the infructescence morphologic range are most similar to C. heterophylla. As C. johnsonii encompasses a wide morphology range within its features, it is possible it may have diverged out into the modern species. The modern areas of distribution for C.ferox and C. heterophylla overlap in the Sichuan province of China, while C. wangii has a distinct and separate range in southwest China.

Isolated nuts from Paleocene sediments in Greenland, England, and Montana have been attributed to the genus Corylus. However all lack the surrounding infructescence that is needed to confirm placement of the nuts in a specific coryloid genus.

== Description ==
The infructescences bear between 2 and 3 nuts at the end of a stout stalk. The nuts, 8 to 17 millimetres (0.31 to 0.67 in) in diameter, are ovoid to almost circular in outline and enclosed in an involucre composed of 2 bracts. While most specimens consist of paired involucres with ovoid nuts or nut casts, several paired or isolated nuts are known. On the nuts themselves basal attachment scars cover a small area of nut; distal scars and style remains are preserved in several specimens. A predominant number of the fruits possess more dissected involucres, some having simple spines, while others have both simple and branched spines.
