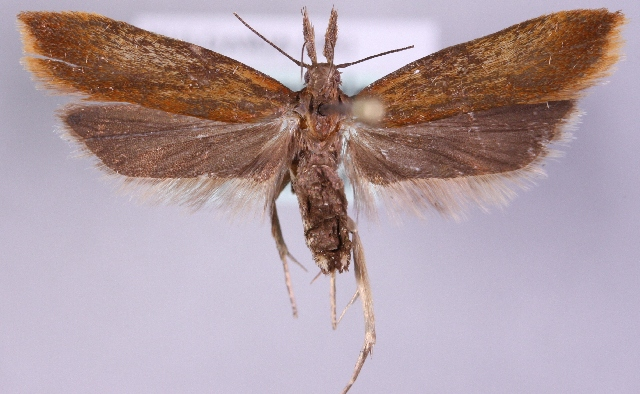

Scientific classification
- Domain: Eukaryota
- Kingdom: Animalia
- Phylum: Arthropoda
- Class: Insecta
- Order: Lepidoptera
- Family: Gelechiidae
- Genus: Dichomeris
- Species: D. ustalella

Binomial name
- Dichomeris ustalella (Fabricius, 1794)

Synonyms
- Tinea ustalella Fabricius, 1794; Tinea capucinella Hübner, 1796; Ypsolophus cornutus Fabricius, 1798

= Dichomeris ustalella =

Species of moth

Dichomeris ustalella is a moth in the family Gelechiidae. It is found in south-eastern Siberia, the Caucasus, Transcaucasia, Korea, Japan, China (Zhejiang, Jiangxi, Yunnan) and Europe, where it has been recorded from most of the continent, except for Ireland, the Iberian Peninsula and Scandinavia.

The wingspan is 15–20 mm (0.59–0.79 in). Adults are on wing in May and June.

The larvae feed on Tilia cordata, Corylus heterophylla var. thunbergii, Betula, Carpinus and Acer species, as well as Fagus silvatica and Quercus serrata. They feed from in between leaves spun together. Pupation takes places amongst detritus on the ground.
