= Akazaki Formation =

Geologic formation in Japan

Akasaki Formation
- Stratigraphic range: Early Eocene
- Type: Geological formation

Location
- Region: Fukuoka Prefecture
- Country: Japan

The Akazaki Formation is a Cenozoic geologic formation in Kyushu, Japan.

== Fossils ==
Mammal remains are among the fossils that have been recovered from the formation. A tillodont specimen similar to Trogosus was described from this unit by Miyata (2007).

== See also ==
- List of dinosaur-bearing rock formations
  - List of stratigraphic units with indeterminate dinosaur fossils
