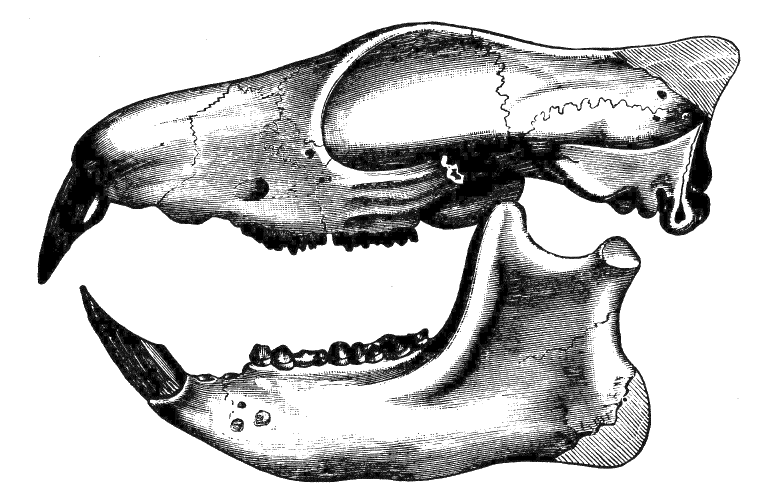
- Skull of T. fodiens

Scientific classification
- Kingdom: Animalia
- Phylum: Chordata
- Class: Mammalia
- Order: †Tillodontia
- Family: †Esthonychidae
- Subfamily: †Trogosinae
- Genus: †Tillodon; Gazin 1953

Species
- T. fodiens (Gazin, 1953)

= Tillodon =

Tillodon Temporal range: Eocene Bridgerian

Extinct genus of mammals

Tillodon is an extinct mammal genus of tillodont from Eocene North America.

== Description ==
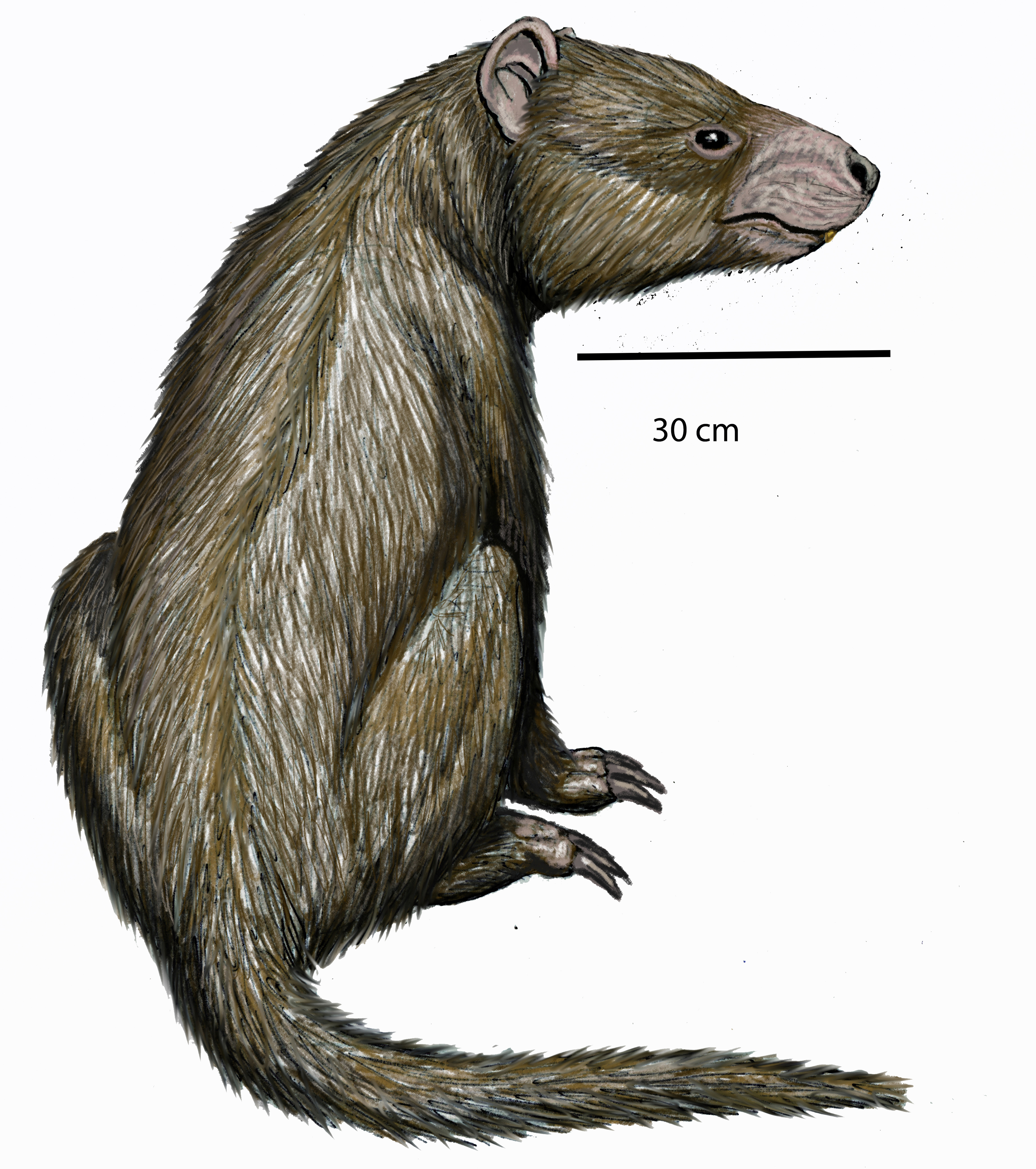
Life reconstruction of T. fodiens

Tillodon had a large skull and teeth, with a deep and thick jaw. The molars are brachydont. The premaxilla of Tillodon makes up a majority of the skull's size. Tillodon has been compared to rodents due to enlarged incisor teeth, which (alongside the related Trogosus) has caused the genus to be erroneously considered the ancestors of the rodents .

== Paleoecology ==
Tillodon is known from the lower Bridger formation of Wyoming, and lived alongside many artiodactyls, such as homacodonts, perissodactyls like the early brontothere Telmatherium, dinocerates like Uintatherium and early carnivorans like Uintacyon.Tillodon most likely ate tubers and roots, much like other tillodonts.
