= Dazhang Formation =

Geographic formation in China

- Stratigraphic range: Late Paleocene
- Type: Geological formation
- Underlies: Tantou Formation
- Overlies: Gaoyugou Formation
- Thickness: 373.2 m

Lithology
- Primary: Marl, oil shale, claystone and glutenite

Location
- Coordinates: 33.39°N 111.11°E
- Region: Henan
- Country: China
- Extent: Tantou Basin
- Dazhang Formation (China) Dazhang Formation (Henan)

The Dazhang Formation (simplified Chinese: 大章组; traditional Chinese: 大章組; pinyin: Dàzhāng zǔ) is a geologic formation in China. It preserves fossils dating back to the late Paleocene, including those of plants and mammals. The formation is primarily composed of interbedded marl, oil shale, claystone and glutenite. Depending on the section, the color of the mudstone may vary from green, red-brown or gray-black.

== Dating ==
Comprehensive comparison of the lithology and stratigraphy suggests the Dazhang Formation was deposited during the late Paleocene. This dating is further supported by fossil evidence, as standard Paleocene fossils such as those of the snails Parhydrobia xiaohegouensis and Opeas guangdongensis, and anagalid mammals. Palynological evidence based on large amounts of Paleocene palynomorphs (including Proteaceae and Ulmaceae) also supports a late Paleocene age for this formation.

== Depositional environment ==
Judging from the lithology and absence of evaporative salt debris, the Dazhang Formation is believed to have represented delta and semi-deep lake environments, with a mild and humid climate during deposition. Palynology indicates the vegetation of the Dazhang Formation was primarily a mixed forest of coniferous and broadleaf deciduous trees within warm and temperate conditions, with broadleaf deciduous trees being dominant. Using the coexistence approach, the mean annual temperature has been estimated at 11.8–19.6 °C, with the mean temperatures of the warmest and coldest months at 19.8–28 °C and 3.9–5.9 °C respectively. Mean annual precipitation is believed to be 793.9–1389.4 mm.

== Fossil content ==
=== Mammals ===
Mammals reported from the Dazhang Formation
Genus	Species	Presence	Material	Notes	Images
Pseudictopidae		Wangpo Village.	Mandible.	An anagaloid.	
Yuesthonyx	Y. tingae	Wangpo Village.	Skull elements.	A tillodont.	

=== Plants ===
Plants reported from the Dazhang Formation
Genus	Species	Presence	Material	Notes	Images
Alnipollenites	A. metaplasmus		Pollen.		
Alnipollenites	A. verus		Pollen.		
Aquilapollenites	A. granibaculus		Pollen.	An angiosperm.	
Araliaceoipollenites			Pollen.	A magnoliopsid.	
Atlantopollis			Pollen.	An angiosperm.	
Beaupreaidites	B. aggregatus		Pollen.	A member of Proteaceae.	
Beaupreaidites	B. striatus		Pollen.	A member of Proteaceae.	
Carpinipites			Pollen.		
Caryapollenites			Pollen.		
Cupuliferoipollenites	C. fusus		Pollen.		
Cupuliferoipollenites	C. oviformis		Pollen.		
Cyathidites			Spores.	A pteridopsid.	
Echitriporites	E. trianguliformis		Pollen.	A member of Proteaceae.	
Ephedripites			Pollen.	An ephedrale.	
Euphorbiacites			Pollen.		
Fraxinoipollenites			Pollen.	A magnoliophyte.	
Ginkgo	G. henanensis		30 leaves.	A ginkgoale.	
Liliacidites			Pollen.	A member of Liliales.	
Liquidambarpollenites			Pollen.	A member of Altingiaceae.	
Magnolipollis			Pollen.		
Momipites	M. corylus		Pollen.	A magnoliopsid.	
Osmundacidites			Spores.	A pteridopsid.	
Paraalnipollenites	P. confusus		Pollen.		
Pinuspollenites			Pollen.	A conifer.	
Plicapollis	P. granulatus		Pollen.		
Polypodiaceoisporites	P. triangulus		Spores.		
Propylipollis	P. sp.		Pollen.	A member of Proteaceae.	
Proteacidites	P. adenanthoides		Pollen.	A proteale.	
Proteacidites	P. liaoningensis		Pollen.	A proteale.	
Proteacidites	P. microverrucatus		Pollen.	A proteale.	
Proteacidites	P. tenellus		Pollen.	A proteale.	
Proteacidites	P. tenuispinosus		Pollen.	A proteale.	
Quercoidites			Pollen.	Oak pollen.	
Rhamnacidites			Pollen.	A buckthorn.	
Rhoipites	R. dolium		Pollen.	A magnoliopsid.	
Rutaceoipollenites			Pollen.	A member of Rutaceae.	
Salixipollenites	S. minor		Pollen.		
Sapindaceidites			Pollen.	A soapberry.	
Sequoiapollenites			Pollen.	A conifer.	
Taxodiaceapollenites	T. bockwitzensis		Pollen.	A conifer.	
Taxodiaceapollenites	T. hiatus		Pollen.	A conifer.	
Ulmipollenites	U. minor		Pollen.		
Ulmipollenites	U. undulosus		Pollen.		
Ulmoideipites	U. krempi		Pollen.	A magnoliopsid.	
Ulmoideipites	U. tricostata		Pollen.	A magnoliopsid.	
