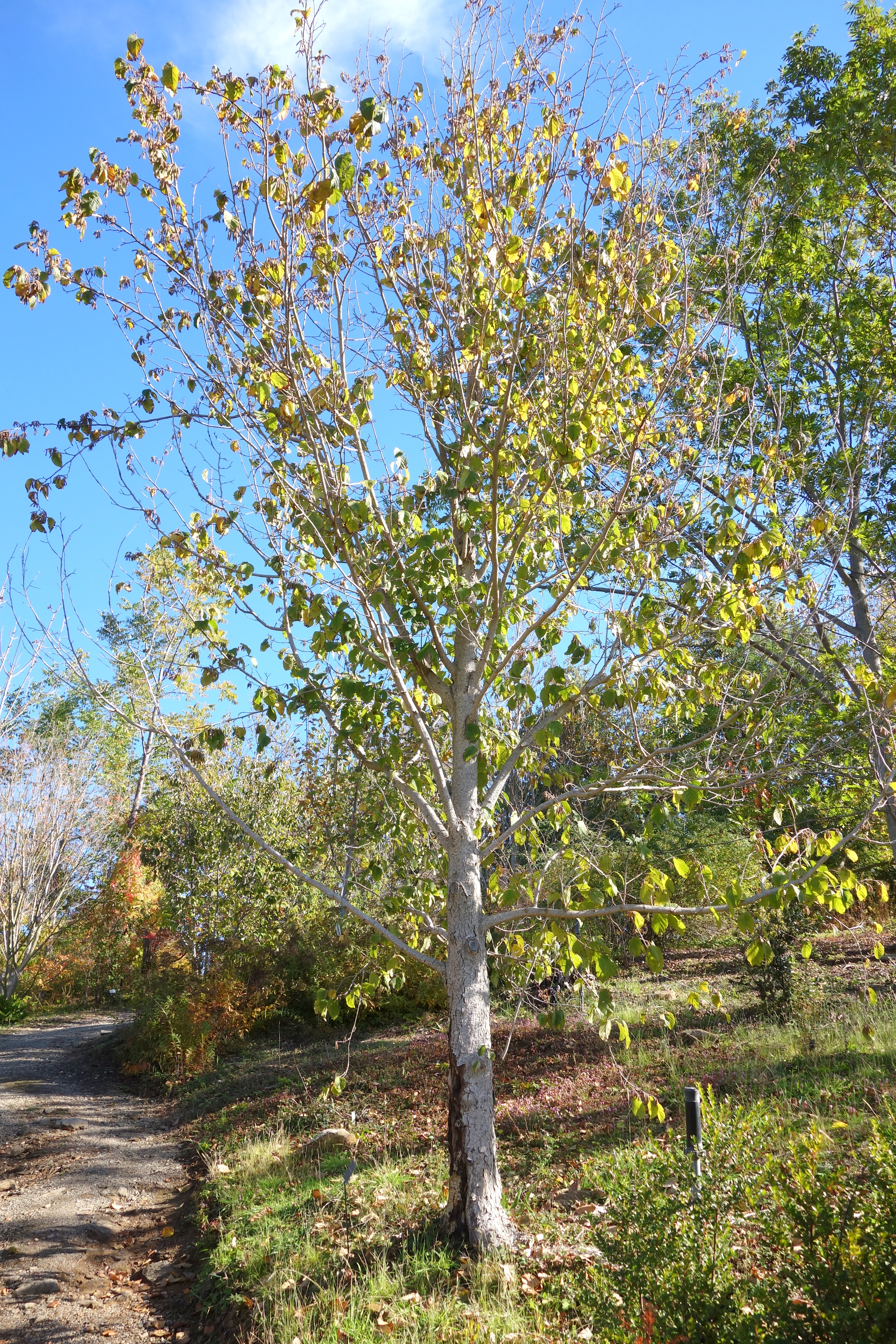

Conservation status
- Least Concern (IUCN 3.1)

Scientific classification
- Kingdom: Plantae
- Clade: Embryophytes
- Clade: Tracheophytes
- Clade: Angiosperms
- Clade: Eudicots
- Clade: Rosids
- Order: Fagales
- Family: Betulaceae
- Genus: Corylus
- Species: C. yunnanensis

Binomial name
- Corylus yunnanensis (Franch.) A.Camus

Synonyms
- Corylus heterophylla var. yunnanensis Franch.

= Corylus yunnanensis =

Species of tree

Corylus yunnanensis, the Yunnan hazel, is a species of hazelnut found in south-central China. It is a small tree or shrub. The flowers have triangular shaped petals.

The species is native to western Guizhou, Hubei, southwestern and western Sichuan, and western Yunnan provinces, where it grows in broadleaf deciduous forests and mountain thickets from 1,600 to 3,700 metres elevation.

It flowers from May to July and fruits from July to September. The round nuts which are encased in a very tough oval shaped shell and can be consumed by humans. The plant is not commercially grown for the nuts, rather they are sometimes used as ornamental plants.
