= Ginkgo henanensis =

Ginkgo henanensis Temporal range: Paleocene

Scientific classification
- Kingdom: Plantae
- Clade: Tracheophytes
- Clade: Gymnospermae
- Division: Ginkgophyta
- Class: Ginkgoopsida
- Order: Ginkgoales
- Family: Ginkgoaceae
- Genus: Ginkgo
- Species: †G. henanensis

Binomial name
- †Ginkgo henanensis Li et al., 2023

Species of extinct seed plant in the family Ginkgoaceae

Ginkgo henanensis is an extinct species of seed plant in the family Ginkgoaceae. Fossil specimens of this species are known from Paleocene deposits in Henan, China.

== Discovery and naming ==
Ginkgo henanensis is known from 30 fossilized leaves, all excavated from the Dazhang Formation of Luanchuan, Henan Province, China, though only 4 of these leaves are well-preserved. These specimens have been deposited in the Paleobotanical Lab of Chang'a university in China.

The generic name "Ginkgo" comes from its Japanese name, Gin an and Itsjò, which means "silver apricot". The specific name refers to Henan Province, where all currently known specimens originate from.

== Description ==
The known sample of fossil leaves indicates that Ginkgo henanensis was heterophyllous, with both bilobed and multi-lobed forms known. It is one of two Cenozoic Ginkgo known to only have lobed leaves, whilst other Cenozoic species have entire-margined leaves, making G. henanensis more similar to Mesozoic Ginkgo species in this respect. In the adaxial lamina, there is one central papilla in each cell. Trichomes are absent in this species.

The leaves of this species fall within two leaf mass per area (LMA) range groups of 120.9 g/m2 to 131.3 g/m2, and 184.5 g/m2 to 187.4 g/m2 respectively. As both groups have higher LMA than the extant Ginkgo biloba, it is believed that Ginkgo henanensis had a slower ecological return strategy and lower nutrient recycling rate, possibly allowing Paleocene Ginkgo to take up a broader range of ecological niches than its extant counterpart.
