= Azygonyx =

Azygonyx Temporal range: Late Paleocene-Early Eocene (Clarkforkian-Wasatchian) ~56–50 Ma

Scientific classification
- Kingdom: Animalia
- Phylum: Chordata
- Class: Mammalia
- Order: †Tillodontia
- Family: †Esthonychidae
- Genus: †Azygonyx; Gingerich 1989

Type species
- Azygonyx gunnelli (Gingerich & Gunnell 1979)

Species
- A. ancylion (Gingerich & Gunnell 1979); A. grangeri (Simpson 1937); A. gunnelli (Gingerich & Gunnell 1979); A. latidens (Simpson 1937); A. xenicus (Gingerich & Gunnell 1979)

Synonyms
- Esthonyx Lucas & Schoch 1998

Extinct genus of mammals

Azygonyx was a small tillodont mammal, likely the size of a cat to raccoon, that lived in North America during the Paleocene and Eocene in the early part of the Cenozoic Era. The only fossils that have been recovered are from the Willwood and Fort Union Formations in the Bighorn Basin of Wyoming, United States, and date to the Clarkforkian to Wasatchian, about 56 to 50 million years ago. Fifty-six collections that have been recovered thus far include the remains of Azygonyx. Azygonyx survived the Paleocene Eocene Thermal Maximum along with other mammals like Phenacodus and Ectocion, both of which were ground-dwelling mammals. Azygonyx probably was a generalist terrestrial mammal that may have roamed around the ground, but was also capable of climbing trees.

== Etymology ==
The genus name comes from the "a-" meaning absent, "zygos-" meaning joining, and "onyx" meaning claw referencing the unjoined claw-like incisors.

== Taxonomy ==
Azygonyx is placed in the suborder Tillodontia, an extinct group of mammals characterized by rodent-like incisors, clawed feet, and an elongated rostrum and mandibular symphysis. Azygonyx belongs to the family Esthonychidae, but differs from other esthonyids by having an unfused mandibular symphysis.

Five species of Azygonyx are currently known and includes the type species Azygonyx gunnelli (Gingerich and Gunnell, 1979) and the additional species Azygonyx ancylion (Gingerich and Gunnell, 1979), Azygonyx grangeri (Simpson, 1937), Azygonyx latidens (Simpson, 1937), and Azygonyx xenicus (Gingerich and Gunnell, 1979). The genus has a relatively problematic taxonomic history, as the type species Azygonyx gunelli and other species of the genus are alternatively named Esthonyx by Lucas and Schoch (1998).

The type species comes from Park County in northwestern Wyoming, and is composed of teeth, cranial, and postcranial bones. The bone fragments were broken and scattered suggesting a taphonomic pathway that includes trampling before burial. The holotype specimen (UM 83874) from Wyoming, USA consists of upper and lower dentition with dentary bone. Post cranial remains include the scapula, ulna, radius, ankle bones, and others.

== Description ==
No complete skeleton of Azygonyx has been recovered, making the exact appearance and body size of the animal relatively difficult to determine. Compared to other tillodonts, Azygonyx was relatively small, as indicated by an ulna length of about 50 millimetres (2.0 in) and a mandible about 60 millimetres (2.4 in).

The upper dentition of Azygonyx includes three incisors (I1–I3), one canine (C1), premolars (P2–P4), and molars (M1–M3), and the lower dentition includes two incisors (I1–I2), one canine (C1), premolars (P2–P4), and molars (M1–M3). A lower first incisor has not actually been recovered, but is believed to be present due to the available space in the lower jaw. A lower third incisor was likely extremely reduced or absent. The incisors of Azygonyx are tall and nearly vertical. The anterior teeth, the incisors and canines, were crowded. The second incisor has a massive oval crown. Lower premolars have smooth enamel set in a relatively deep jaw and the third premolar crown is large and bulbous.

== Paleoecology ==
Tillodonts are considered to be generalists and some may have been rhizophagous. The large and laterally compressed claws and shallow trochlea of the astragalus suggests that the mode of life of Azygonyx was scansorial, or adapted for climbing. In contrast, bones of the foot suggest a somewhat cursorial or fossorial lifestyle. Worn enamel on the teeth additionally suggest Azygonyx stripped vegetation. Azygonyx likely spent a lot of time in trees, but also occasionally searched for food on the ground or dug for roots.
