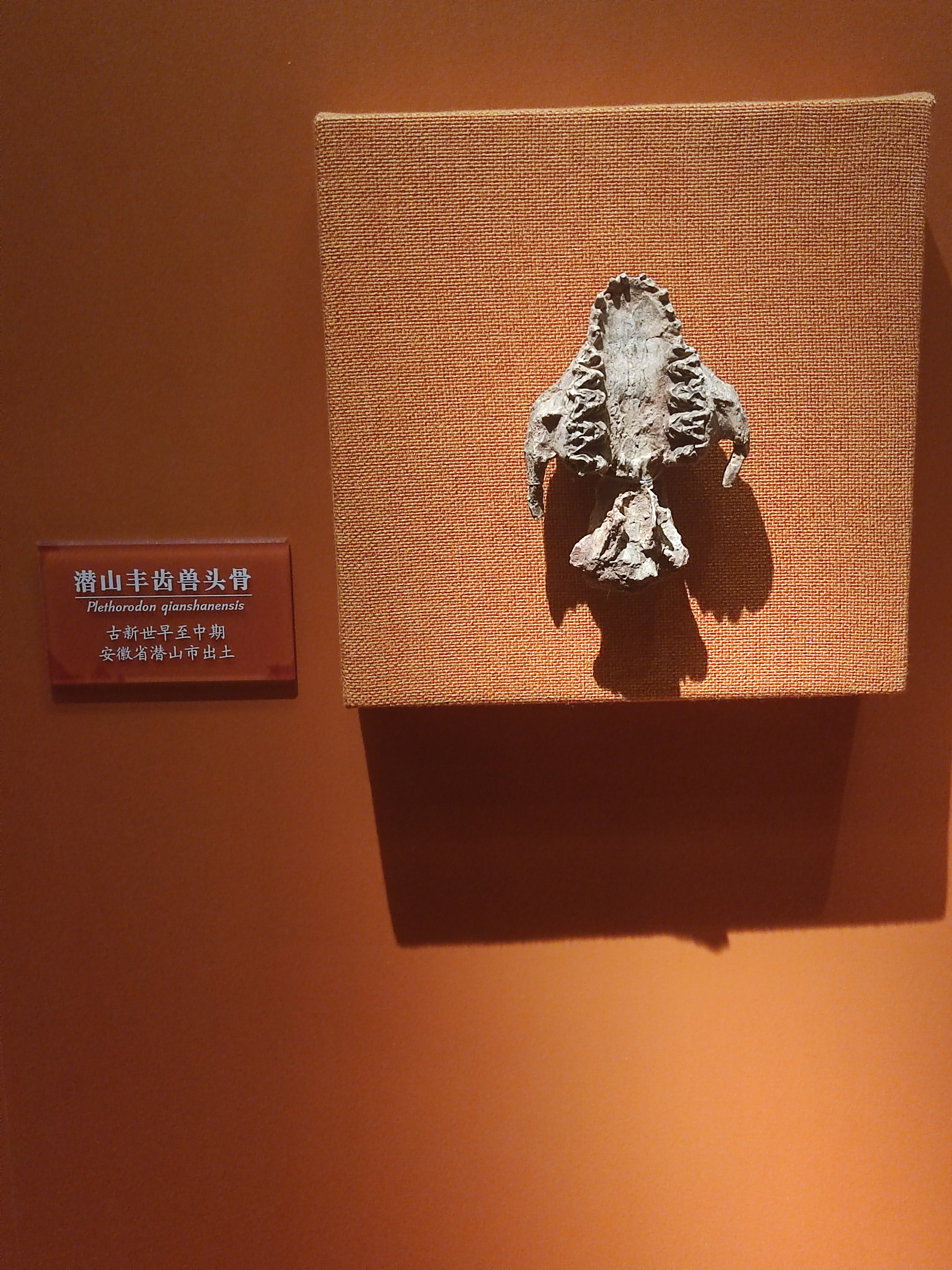

Scientific classification
- Kingdom: Animalia
- Phylum: Chordata
- Class: Mammalia
- Infraclass: Placentalia
- Order: †Tillodontia
- Genus: †Plethorodon; Huang & Zheng, 1987

Type species
- †P. qianyshanensis Huang & Zheng, 1987

= Plethorodon =

Plethorodon Temporal range: Early to late Paleocene 66–61 Ma

Extinct genus of mammals

Plethorodon is an extinct genus of tillodont that lived during Early to Late Paleocene. The type species is P. qianshanensis. which known from partial skull and upper teeth that had been discovered by Huang and Zheng at 1987 at Qianshan, Anhui Province, China.
