= Dichomeris consertellus =

Scientific classification
- Domain: Eukaryota
- Kingdom: Animalia
- Phylum: Arthropoda
- Class: Insecta
- Order: Lepidoptera
- Family: Gelechiidae
- Genus: Dichomeris
- Species: D. consertellus

Binomial name
- Dichomeris consertellus (Christoph, 1882)

Synonyms
- Ypsolophus consertellus Christoph, 1882; Dichomeris consertella

Species of moth

Dichomeris consertellus is a moth in the family Gelechiidae. It was described by Hugo Theodor Christoph in 1882. It is found in south-eastern Siberia and Japan.

The length of the forewings is about 5 mm. The forewings are yellowish brown with black marks. The hindwings are dark grey.

The larvae feed on Corylus heterophylla.
