= Meiostylodon =

Meiostylodon Temporal range: Paleocene, 66–61.7 Ma

Scientific classification
- Kingdom: Animalia
- Phylum: Chordata
- Class: Mammalia
- Infraclass: Placentalia
- Order: †Tillodontia
- Genus: †Meiostylodon; Wang, 1975
- Species: †M. zaoshiensis

Binomial name
- †Meiostylodon zaoshiensis Wang, 1975

Extinct genus of mammals

Meiostylodon is an extinct genus of tillodont that lived during Paleocene. The lone type species, Meiostylodon zaoshiensis, is known only from three isolated teeth found at Zaoshi, Chaling County, Hunan Province in the People's Republic of China. These isolated fossil teeth are stored at the Paleozoological Museum of China.
