= Halictus? savenyei =

Halictus? savenyei Temporal range: Ypresian 51.5 Ma

Scientific classification
- Domain: Eukaryota
- Kingdom: Animalia
- Phylum: Arthropoda
- Class: Insecta
- Order: Hymenoptera
- Family: Halictidae
- Tribe: Halictini
- Genus: Halictus (?)
- Species: H.? savenyei

Binomial name
- Halictus? savenyei Engel & Archibald, 2003

Fossil species of bee

Halictus? savenyei is an extinct species of sweat bee possibly in the halictid genus Halictus. The species is solely known from the Early Eocene, Ypresian stage, Coldwater Beds, part of the Princeton Group, in the Quilchena area, Nicola Country, British Columbia, Canada.

== History and classification ==
Halictus? savenyei is known only from one fossil, the part and counterpart holotype, specimen numbers "Q-0424a" for the part and "Q-0424b" for the counterpart respectively. The specimen is composed of a complete female specimen preserved as a compression fossil on small chips of shale, recovered from outcrops of the Coldwater Beds shales in the Quilchena area by Rene Savenye. The type specimen is currently preserved in the Department of Paleobiology collections housed at Simon Fraser University, located in Burnaby, British Columbia, Canada. H.? savenyei was first studied by Michael S. Engel of the University of Kansas, Lawrence, Kansas, USA and S. Bruce Archibald of the Museum of Comparative Zoology in Cambridge, Massachusetts, USA. Their 2003 type description of the new species was published in the journal The Canadian Entomologist. Engel and Archibald coined the specific epithet savenyei in honor of the late Rene Savenye who found and donated the fossil. At the time of the species description, Halictus? savenyei was the second-oldest bee body fossil described and the only bee described from Canadian fossil deposits.

== Description ==
The H.? savenyei type specimen is a fairly well preserved complete adult female preserved with portions of the fore-wings and hind-wings. The specimen is 7.04 millimetres (0.277 in) long with the possibility of alteration in length during fossilization. The sections of forewing which are preserved are approximately 4.8 millimetres (0.19 in) long and show dark brown to black coloration. The presence of a pygidial plate bordered by setae on the fifth metasomal tergum supports the placement into the Halictidae subfamily Halictinae. Placement into the tribe Halictini is based on the lack of a medial cleft in the fifth tergum.
