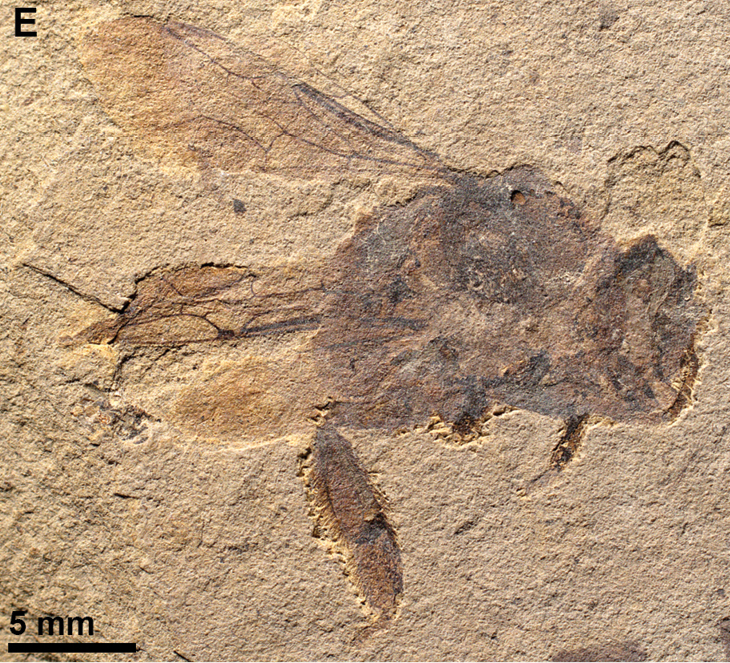
- Holotype specimen

Scientific classification
- Kingdom: Animalia
- Phylum: Arthropoda
- Clade: Pancrustacea
- Class: Insecta
- Order: Hymenoptera
- Family: Apidae
- Genus: Bombus
- Subgenus: Mendacibombus
- Species: B. beskonakensis

Binomial name
- Bombus beskonakensis (Nel & Petrulevicius, 2003)

Synonyms
- Oligoapis beskonakensis Nel & Petrulevicius, 2003

= Bombus beskonakensis =

Bombus beskonakensis Temporal range: Aquitanian

Extinct species of bumblebee

Bombus (Mendacibombus) beskonakensis, formerly Oligoapis beskonakensis, is an extinct bumblebee from the Oligocene rocks of Beş Konak, Turkey.
