= Yuesthonyx =

Yuesthonyx Temporal range: Selandian–Ypresian

Scientific classification
- Kingdom: Animalia
- Phylum: Chordata
- Class: Mammalia
- Order: †Tillodontia
- Family: †Yuesthonychidae
- Genus: †Yuesthonyx
- Species: †Y. tingae

Binomial name
- †Yuesthonyx tingae Tong et al., 2003

Extinct genus of yuesthonychid tillodont

Yuesthonyx is an extinct monotypic genus of yuesthonychid tillodont that lived in what is now East Asia from the Selandian stage of the Palaeocene epoch to the Ypresian stage of the Eocene epoch.

== Distribution ==
Yuesthonyx tingae is known from the Palaeocene Dazhang Formation of China. Remains of the genus undiagnostic to the species level are known from the Eocene Wutu Formation.
