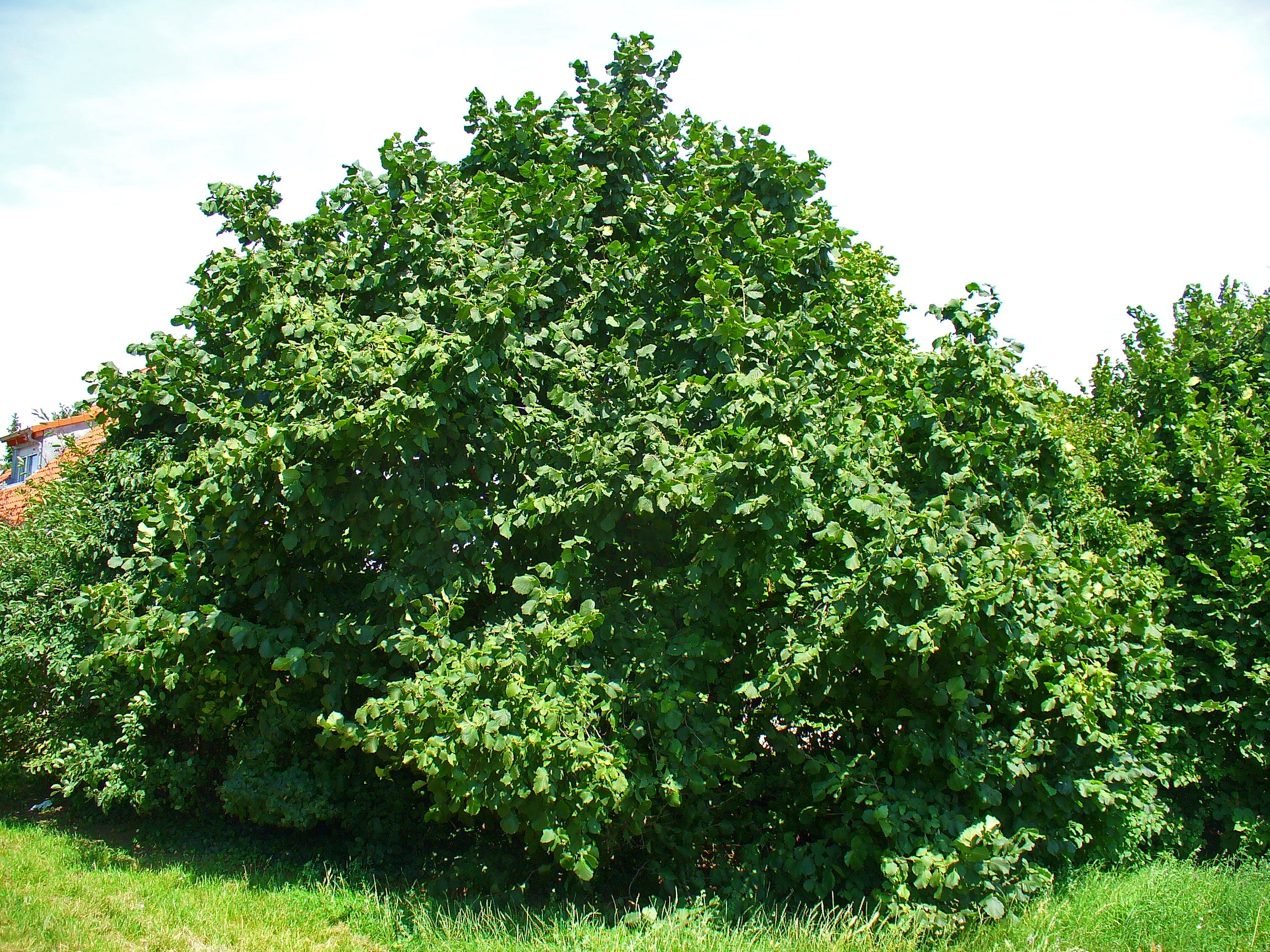
- Common hazel (Corylus avellana)

Scientific classification
- Kingdom: Plantae
- Clade: Tracheophytes
- Clade: Angiosperms
- Clade: Eudicots
- Clade: Rosids
- Order: Fagales
- Family: Betulaceae
- Subfamily: Coryloideae
- Genus: Corylus; L.

Type species
- Corylus avellana L.

Species
- See text for species.

Synonyms
- Lopima Dochnahl

= Hazel =

Hazels

Genus of trees

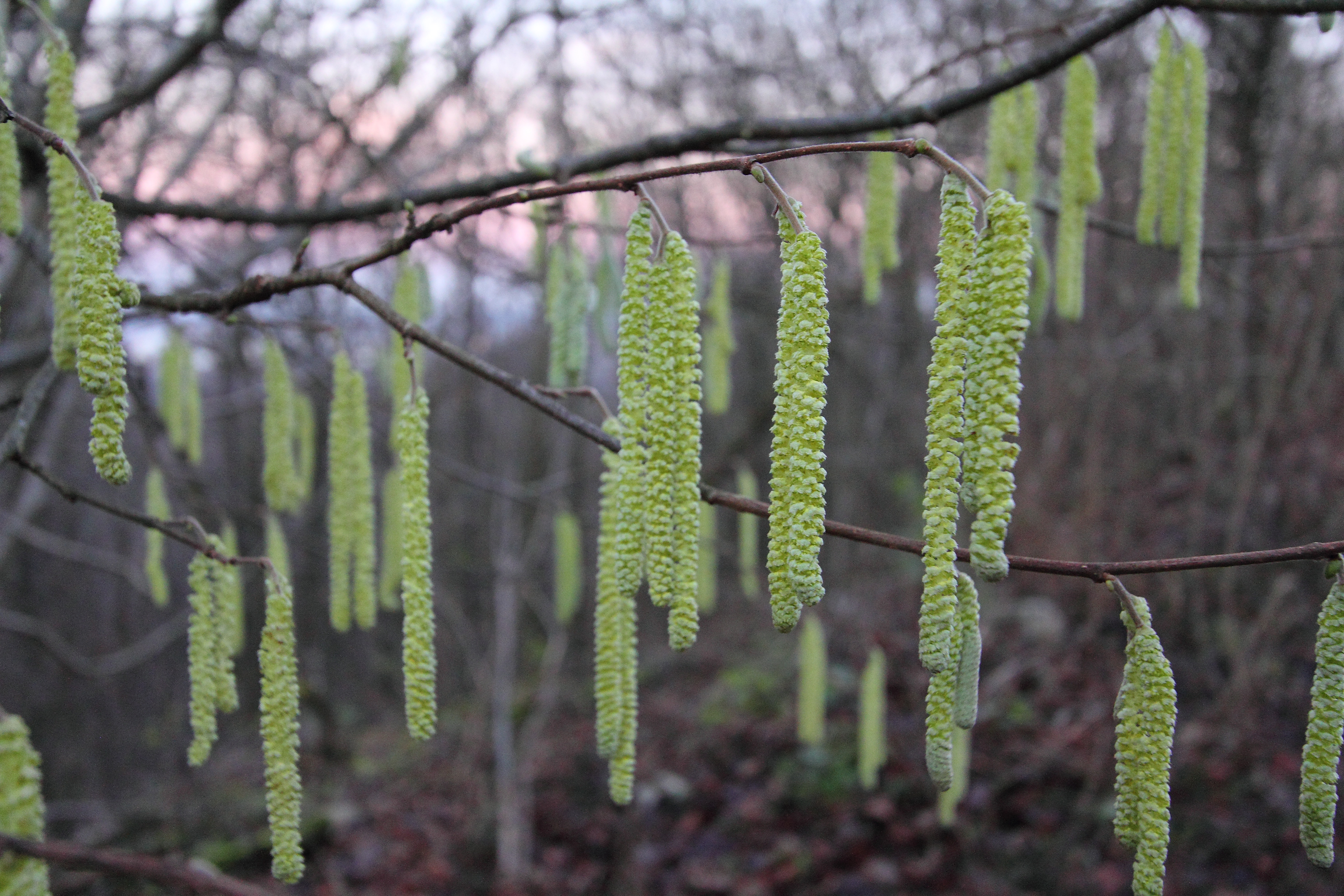
Young male catkins of Corylus avellana

Hazels are plants of the genus Corylus of deciduous trees and large shrubs native to the temperate Northern Hemisphere. The genus is usually placed in the birch family, Betulaceae, though some botanists split the hazels (with the hornbeams and allied genera) into a separate family Corylaceae. The fruit of the hazel is the hazelnut; the trees are also grown as ornaments in hedges or gardens.

== Botany ==
Hazels have simple, rounded leaves with double-serrate margins; young leaves have fine red stipules that are shed at a later age.

The flowers are produced very early in spring before the leaves, and are monoecious, with single-sex catkins. The male catkins are pale yellow and 5–12 centimetres (2–4 3/4 inches) long; catkins of the common C. avellana contain 150–200 flowers each collectively producing pollen with a volume as high as 4933 grains/square metre. The female ones are very small and largely concealed in the buds, with only the bright-red, 1-to-3 mm-long styles visible. Hazel pollen, which are often the cause for allergies in late winter or early spring, can be identified under magnification (600×) by their characteristic granular exines bearing three conspicuous pores.

The fruits are nuts 1–2.5 cm (1/2–1 in) long and 1–2 cm diameter, surrounded by an involucre (husk) which partly to fully encloses the nut. The shape and structure of the involucre, and also the growth habit (whether a tree or a suckering shrub), are important in the identification of the different species of hazel. Kernels of nuts from various cultivars make up between 33.20% to 49.5% of the fruit, especially cultivars grown close to the Mediterranean Sea.

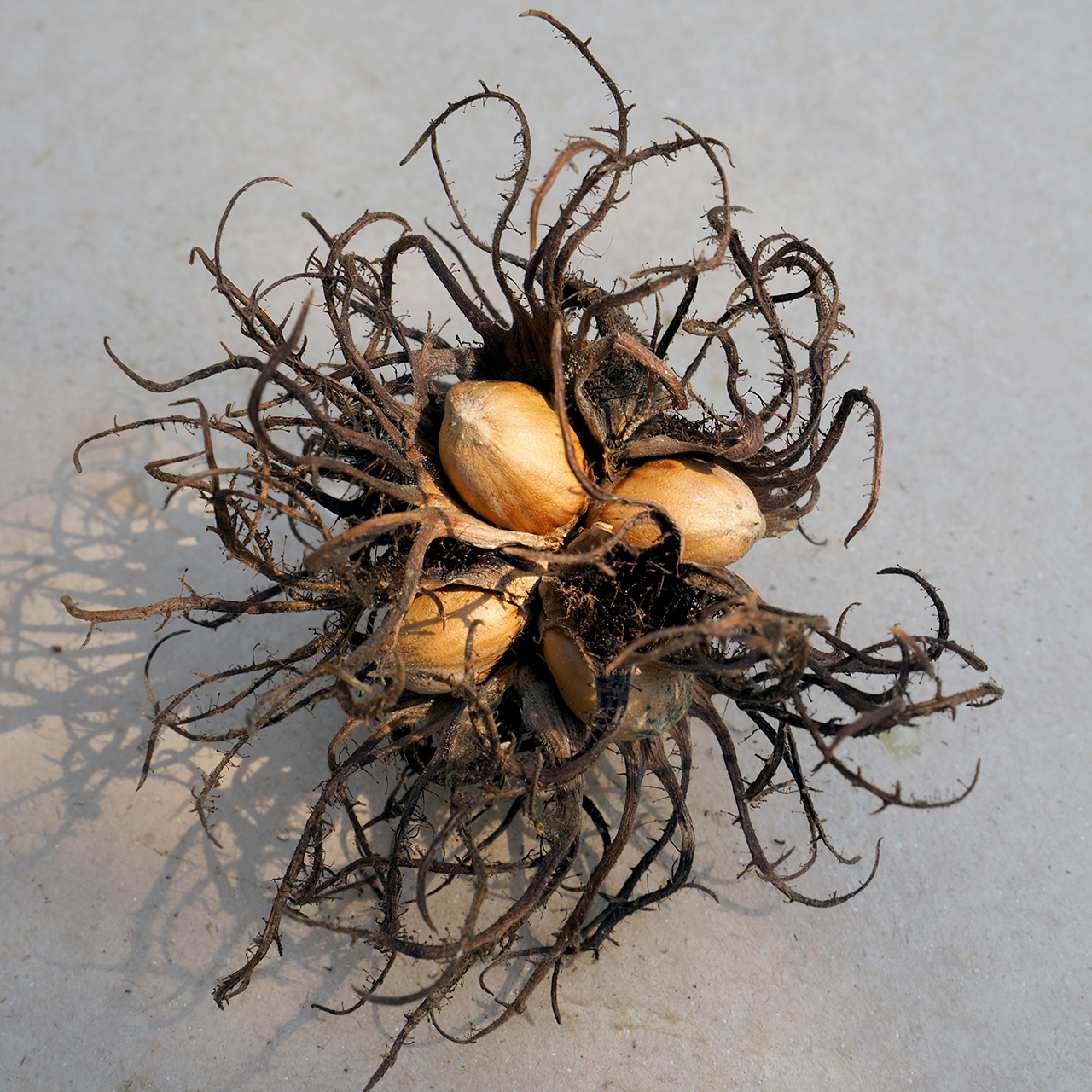
Dried cluster of ripe Turkish hazelnuts

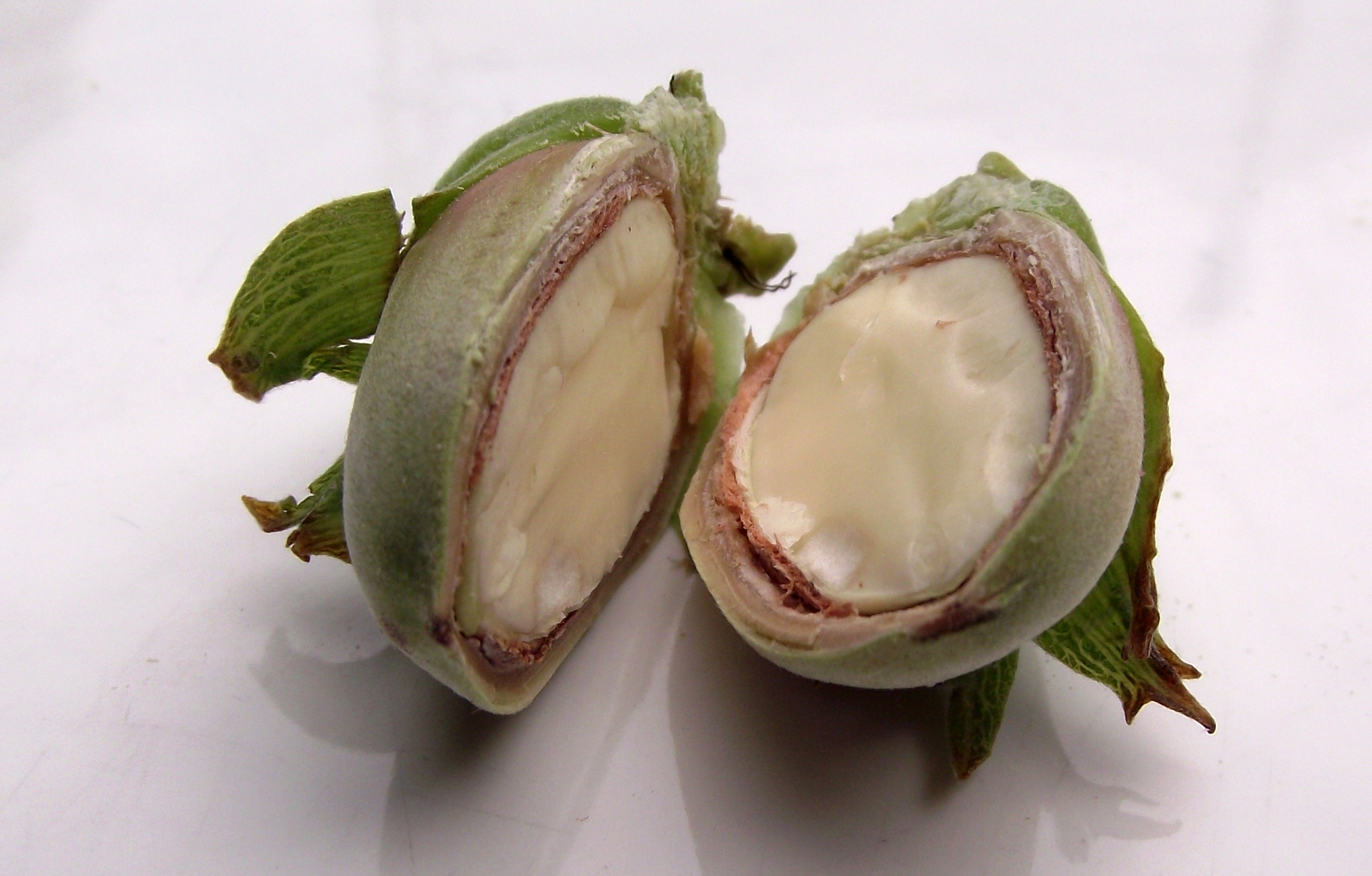
Common hazel fruit split in two showing its husk and kernel

Fossils date back to the Cretaceous, and it was likely part of the diet of certain dinosaurs.

== Species ==
Corylus has around 14–18 species. The circumscription of species in eastern Asia is disputed, with World Flora Online and the Flora of China differing in which taxa are accepted, within this region. WFO accepts 17 species while Flora of China accepts 20 species (including Corylus mandshurica).

Only those taxa accepted by both sources are listed below.

The species are grouped as follows:

- Nut surrounded by a soft, leafy involucre, multiple-stemmed, suckering shrubs to 12 m tall
  - Involucre short, about the same length as the nut
    - Corylus americana – American hazel, eastern North America
    - Corylus avellana – Common hazel, Europe and western Asia
    - Corylus heterophylla – Asian hazel, Asia
    - Corylus yunnanensis – Yunnan hazel, central and southern China
  - Involucre long, twice the length of the nut or more, forming a 'beak'
    - Corylus colchica – Colchican filbert, Caucasus
    - Corylus cornuta – Beaked hazel, North America
    - Corylus maxima – Filbert, southeastern Europe and southwest Asia
    - Corylus sieboldiana – Asian beaked hazel, northeastern Asia and Japan (syn. C. mandshurica)
- Nut surrounded by a stiff, spiny involucre, single-stemmed trees to 20–35 m tall
  - Involucre moderately spiny and also with glandular hairs
    - Corylus chinensis – Chinese hazel, western China
    - Corylus colurna – Turkish hazel, southeastern Europe and Asia Minor
    - Corylus fargesii – Farges' hazel, western China
    - Corylus jacquemontii – Jacquemont's hazel, Himalaya
    - Corylus wangii – Wang's hazel, southwest China
  - Involucre densely spiny, resembling a chestnut burr
    - Corylus ferox – Himalayan hazel, Himalaya, Tibet and southwest China (syn. C. tibetica).

Several hybrids exist, and they can occur between species in different sections of the genus, e.g. Corylus × colurnoides (C. avellana × C. colurna). The oldest confirmed hazel species is Corylus johnsonii found as fossils in the Ypresian-age rocks of Ferry County, Washington.

Chilean hazel (Gevuina avellana), despite its name, is not related to this genus.

== Ecology ==
At least 21 species of fungus have a mutualistic relationship with hazel. Lactarius pyrogalus grows almost exclusively on hazel, and hazel is one of two kinds of host for the rare Hypocreopsis rhododendri. Several rare species of Graphidion lichen depend on hazel trees. In the UK, five species of moth are specialised to feed on hazel including Parornix devoniella. Animals which eat hazelnuts include red deer, dormouse and red squirrel.

Myzocallis coryli, a European species of aphid uses this genus exclusively as its host plant, and has caused major agricultural damage in Oregon to Hazel farms after its introduction to the United States.

== Uses ==
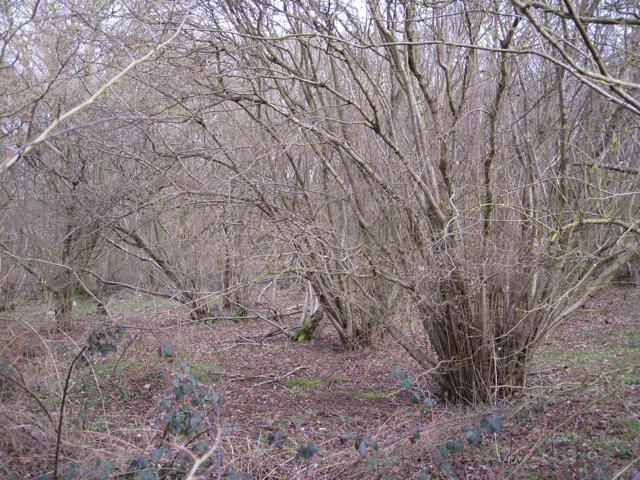
Hazel coppice in winter at Bubbenhall in Warwickshire, England

Hazels have many uses and for this reason have been called the "Swiss Army knife of plants".

The nuts of all hazels are edible. The common hazel is the species most extensively grown for its nuts, followed in importance by the filbert. Nuts are also harvested from the other species, but apart from the filbert, none is of significant commercial importance.

A number of cultivars of the common hazel and filbert are grown as ornamental plants in gardens, including forms with contorted stems (C. avellana 'Contorta', popularly known as "Corkscrew hazel" or "Harry Lauder's walking stick" from its gnarled appearance); with weeping branches (C. avellana 'Pendula'); and with purple leaves (C. maxima 'Purpurea').

Hazel is a traditional material used for making wattle, withy fencing, beanpoles, baskets, and the frames of coracle boats. The tree can be coppiced, and regenerating shoots allow for harvests every few years. There is a seven-year cycle (cut and grow) for hurdle (fence) making.

Hazels are used as food plants by the larvae of various species of Lepidoptera including Eriocrania chrysolepidella.

== Culture ==
The Celts believed hazelnuts gave one wisdom and inspiration. There are numerous variations on an ancient tale that nine hazel trees grew around a sacred pool, dropping into the water nuts that were eaten by salmon (a fish sacred to Druids), which absorbed the wisdom. A Druid teacher, in his bid to become omniscient, caught one of these special salmon and asked a student to cook the fish, but not to eat it. While he was cooking it, a blister formed and the pupil used his thumb to burst it, which he naturally sucked to cool, thereby absorbing the fish's wisdom. This boy was called Fionn Mac Cumhail (Fin McCool) and went on to become one of the most heroic leaders in Gaelic mythology.

"The Hazel Branch" from Grimms' Fairy Tales claims that hazel branches offer the greatest protection from snakes and other things that creep on the earth. In the Grimm tale "Cinderella", a hazel branch is planted by the protagonist at her mother's grave and grows into a tree that is the site where the girl's wishes are granted by birds.

The Russian Oreshnik (Russian: Орешник, lit. 'Hazel tree') missile is named for the Hazel tree.

== Gallery ==
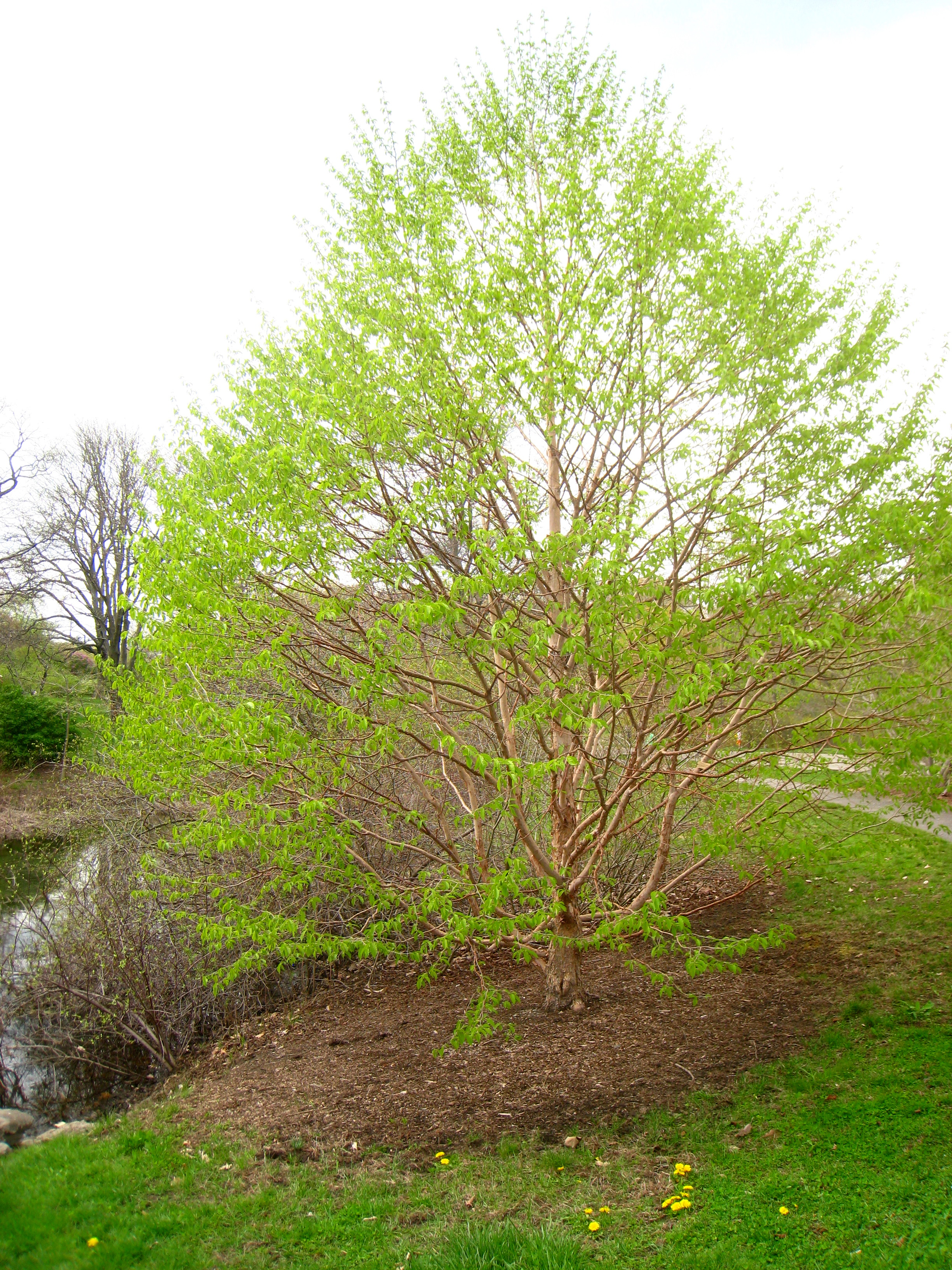
Form (Farges' hazel)

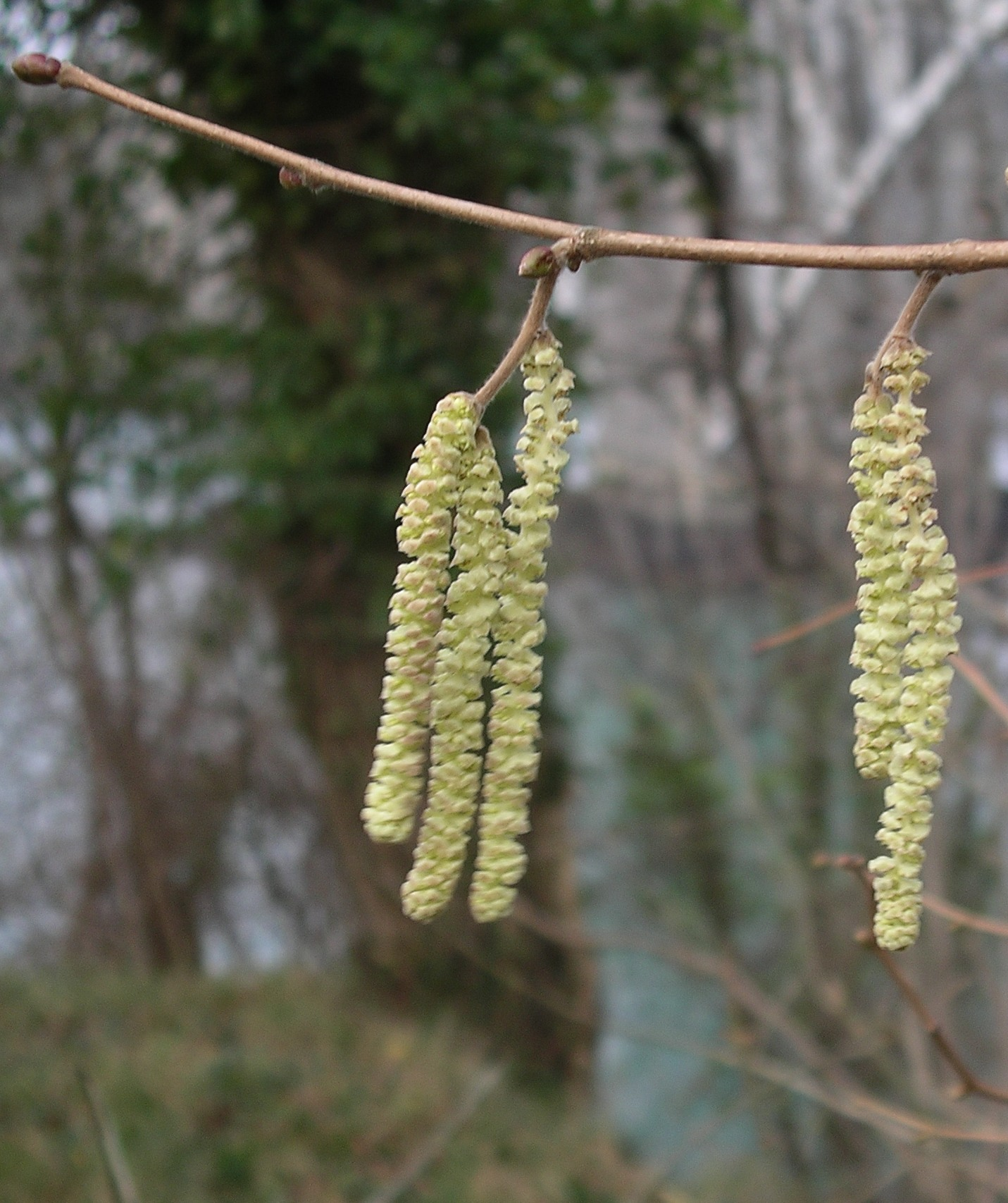
Male catkins (common hazel)

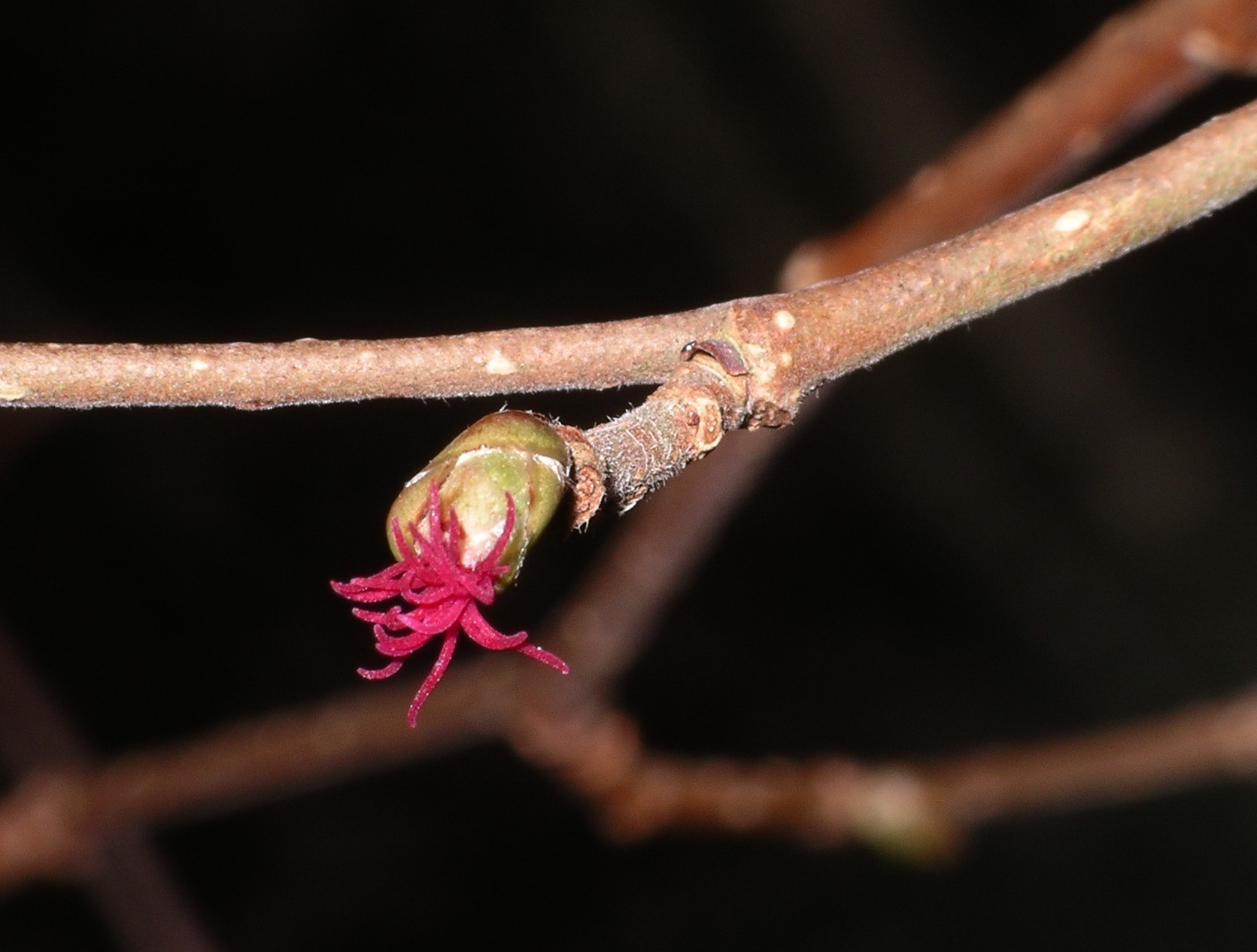
Female flower (common hazel)

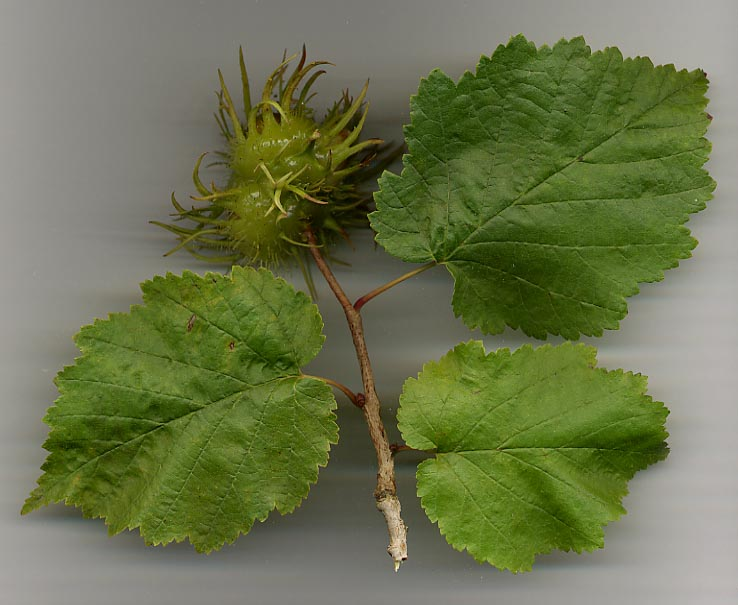
Leaves and nuts with spiny husks (Turkish hazel)

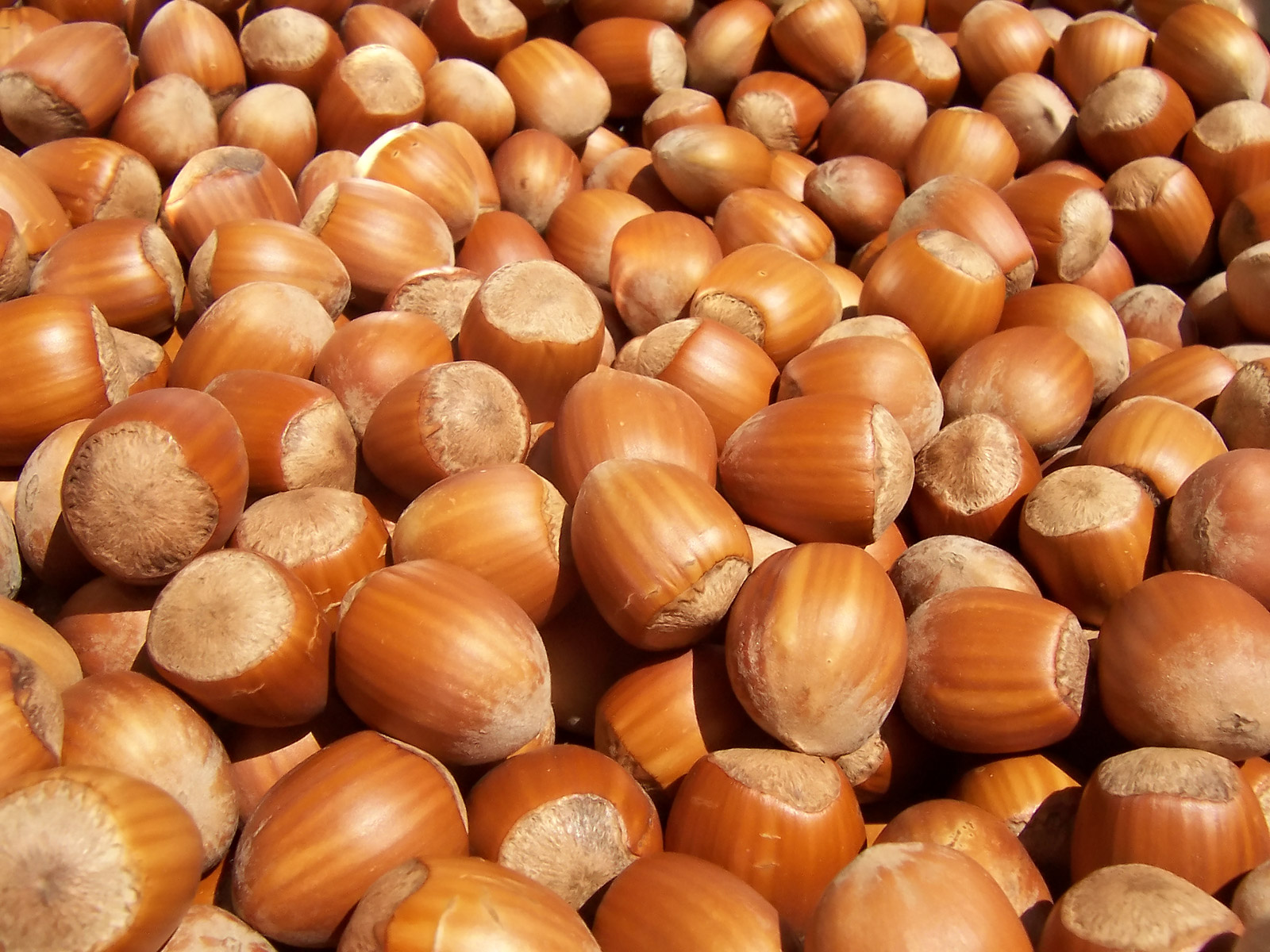
Hazelnuts

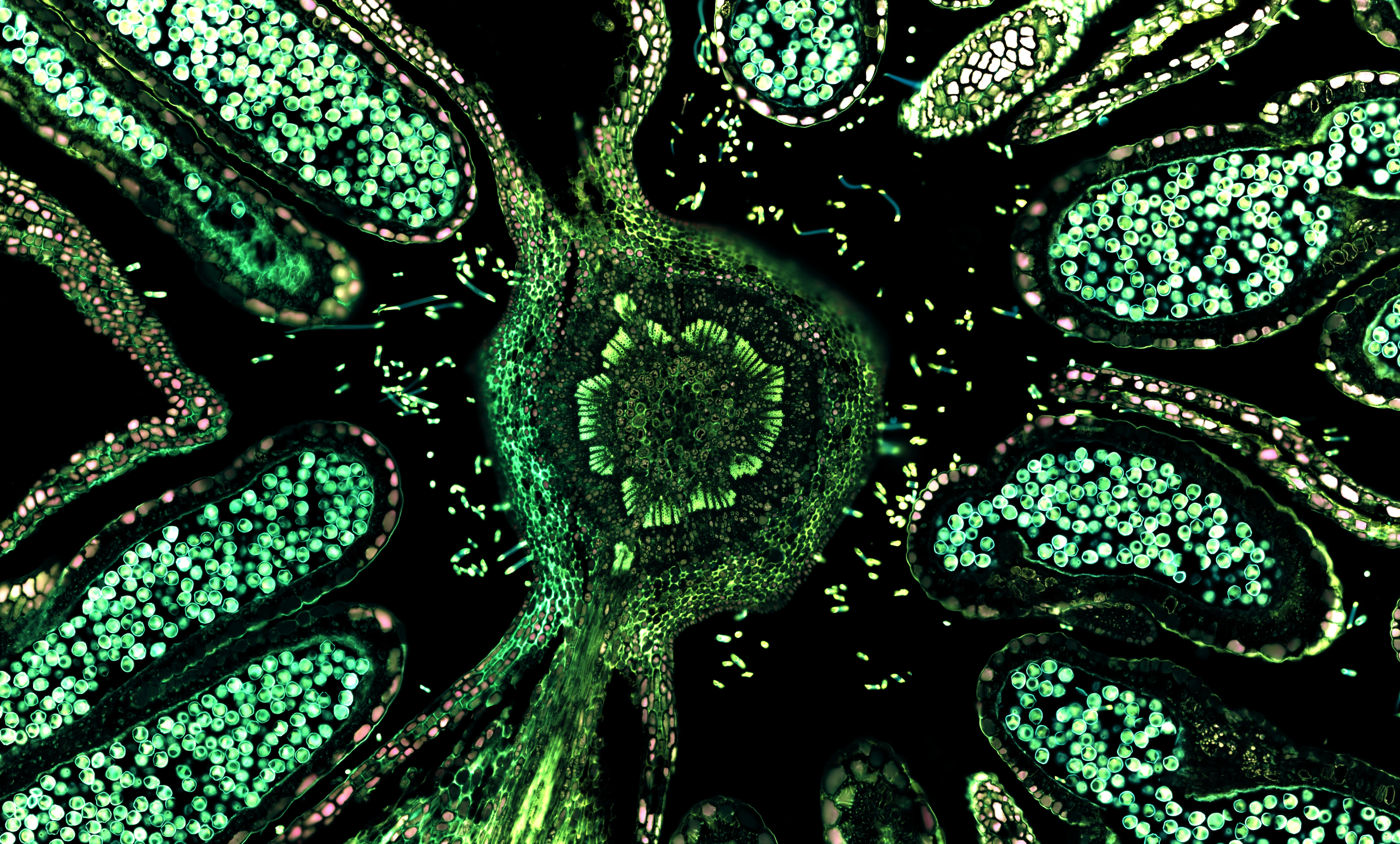
Closeup of a male hazelnut flower using autofluorescence microscopy
