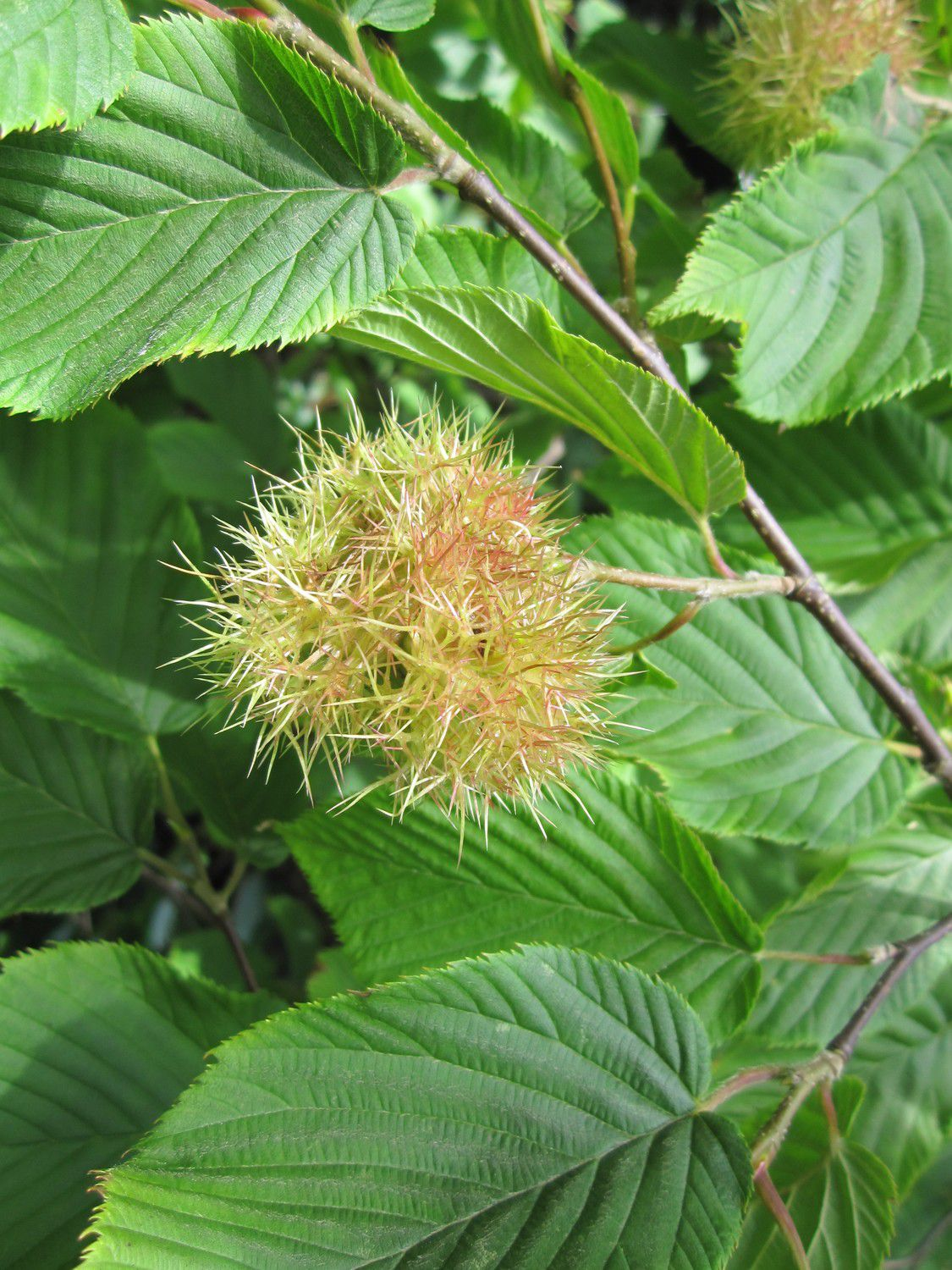

Conservation status
- Least Concern (IUCN 3.1)

Scientific classification
- Kingdom: Plantae
- Clade: Tracheophytes
- Clade: Angiosperms
- Clade: Eudicots
- Clade: Rosids
- Order: Fagales
- Family: Betulaceae
- Genus: Corylus
- Species: C. ferox

Binomial name
- Corylus ferox Wall.

Varieties
- Corylus ferox var. ferox; Corylus ferox var. tibetica (Batalin) Franch.

Synonyms
- synonyms of var. tibetica: Corylus tibetica Batalin

= Corylus ferox =

Himalayan hazelnut

Species of flowering plant

Corylus ferox, the Himalayan hazelnut or Tibetan hazelnut, is a species of hazel. It is a shrub or tree native to the central and eastern Himalayas and central and northern China.

== Description ==
The Himalayan hazelnut is a deciduous tree growing to 32 m (105 ft) tall, with a monoecious leaf that can individually be male or female and some can be both sexes. The leaves are rounded or elliptic, 7–12 cm (2 3/4–4 3/4 in) long and 3–5 cm (1–2 in) broad, with a fine and sharply serrated margin and an often truncated apex. The flowers are wind-pollinated catkins and precocious. The male (pollen) catkins are pendulous with numerous solitary flowers and no perianth, while the female catkins are inconspicuous, 6-8 scaly buds and perianth adnate.
