= Amitabha urbsinterdictensis =

Amitabha urbsinterdictensis Temporal range: Middle Eocene

Scientific classification
- Domain: Eukaryota
- Kingdom: Animalia
- Phylum: Chordata
- Class: Aves
- Genus: †Amitabha; Gulas-Wroblewski and Wroblewski, 2002
- Species: †A. urbsinterdictensis

Binomial name
- †Amitabha urbsinterdictensis Gulas-Wroblewski and Wroblewski, 2002

Extinct species of bird

Amitabha urbsinterdictensis is an ancient bird from the Middle Eocene (approximately 50 million years before the present) in North America. One specimen has been found to date. Bonnie Gulas-Wroblewski and Anton Wroblewski described and named it in 2002.

== Specimens ==
The only known specimen of A. urbsinterdictensis is the type, AMNH 30331, which consists of a partial skeleton, including an incomplete humerus, scapula, sternum, and pelvis. It is from the Bridger Formation of Wyoming, which is of Middle Eocene age.

== Relationships ==
In their 2002 paper, Gulas-Wroblewski and Wroblewski found A. urbsinterdictensis to be a crown-group galliform, and a member of the "phasianoids", the group that also includes such birds as peacocks, pheasants, and turkeys. Gerald Mayr criticized this analysis. A 2009 study by Daniel Ksepka found the species to belong neither to the crown nor the stem of the galliformes, but rather to have affinities to the rails.

== Name ==
Explaining their choice of name, Gulas-Wroblewski and Wroblewski wrote, "urbsinterdictensis refers to the "Forbidden City" locality of Wyoming. Amitabha is for Amitabha Buddha, the bodhisattva of enlightenment and compassion, who commonly adopts the form of a peacock when incarnated in the material world".

== Literature cited ==
- Gulas-Wroblewski, Bonnie E.; Wroblewski, Anton F.-J. (November 2003). "A crown-group galliform bird from the Middle Eocene Bridger Formation of Wyoming". Palaeontology. 46 (6): 1269–1280. doi:10.1046/j.0031-0239.2003.00340.x.
- Mayr, Gerald (2009). Paleogene Fossil Birds. Berlin, Germany: Springer. ISBN 978-3-540-89627-2.
- Ksepka, D. T. (2009). "Broken gears in the avian molecular clock: new phylogenetic analyses support stem galliform status for Gallinuloides wyomingensis and rallid affinities for Amitabha urbsinterdictensis". Cladistics. 25: 173–197. doi:10.1111/j.1096-0031.2009.00250.x.
