= Kogolepithecus =

Kogolepithecus Temporal range: Burdigalian

Scientific classification
- Kingdom: Animalia
- Phylum: Chordata
- Class: Mammalia
- Order: Primates
- Genus: †Kogolepithecus
- Species: †K. morotoensis

Binomial name
- †Kogolepithecus morotoensis Pickford et al., 2003

Extinct genus of primates

Kogolepithecus is an extinct genus of catarrhine primate that inhabited Uganda during the Burdigalian. It contains the species K. morotoensis.
