= Corylus wangii =

Conservation status
- Data Deficient (IUCN 3.1)

Scientific classification
- Kingdom: Plantae
- Clade: Embryophytes
- Clade: Tracheophytes
- Clade: Angiosperms
- Clade: Eudicots
- Clade: Rosids
- Order: Fagales
- Family: Betulaceae
- Genus: Corylus
- Species: C. wangii

Binomial name
- Corylus wangii Hu

Species of plant

Corylus wangii is a species of flowering plant in the genus Corylus. It is a shrub known only from northwestern Yunnan in south-central China, where it grows in montane temperate forest from 3,000 to 4,000 metres elevation.
