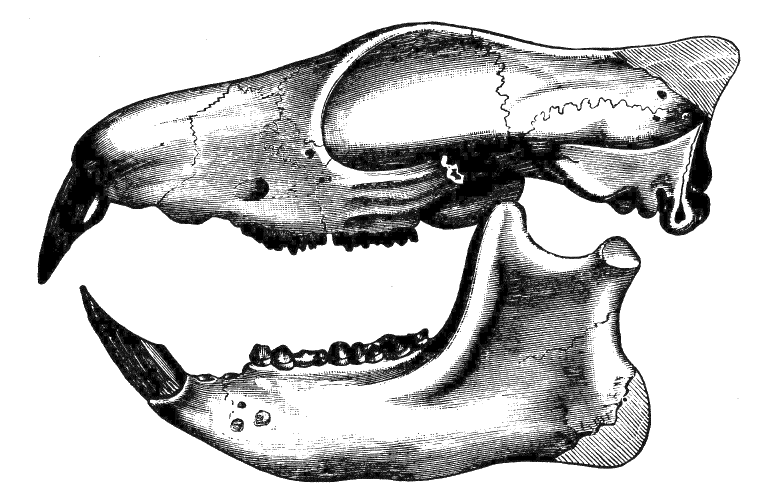
- Skull of Tillodon, a trogosine tillodont

Scientific classification
- Kingdom: Animalia
- Phylum: Chordata
- Class: Mammalia
- Clade: Paraxonia
- Order: †Tillodontia; Marsh, 1875

Genera
- See text

= Tillodontia =

Tillodontia Temporal range: 65–40 Ma Early Paleocene - Late Eocene

Extinct suborder of mammals

Tillodontia is an extinct order or suborder of eutherian mammals known from the Early Paleocene to Late Eocene. They were most diverse and long-lasting in Asia, though several species also lived in North America from the Late Paleocene to Middle Eocene, and a few inhabited Europe during the Early Eocene. Leaving no descendants, their exact affinities are unclear. They may be most closely related to the pantodonts, another extinct group of early Paleogene herbivores. The tillodonts were medium- to large-sized animals that probably fed on roots and tubers in temperate to subtropical habitats.

== Description ==
=== Skull ===
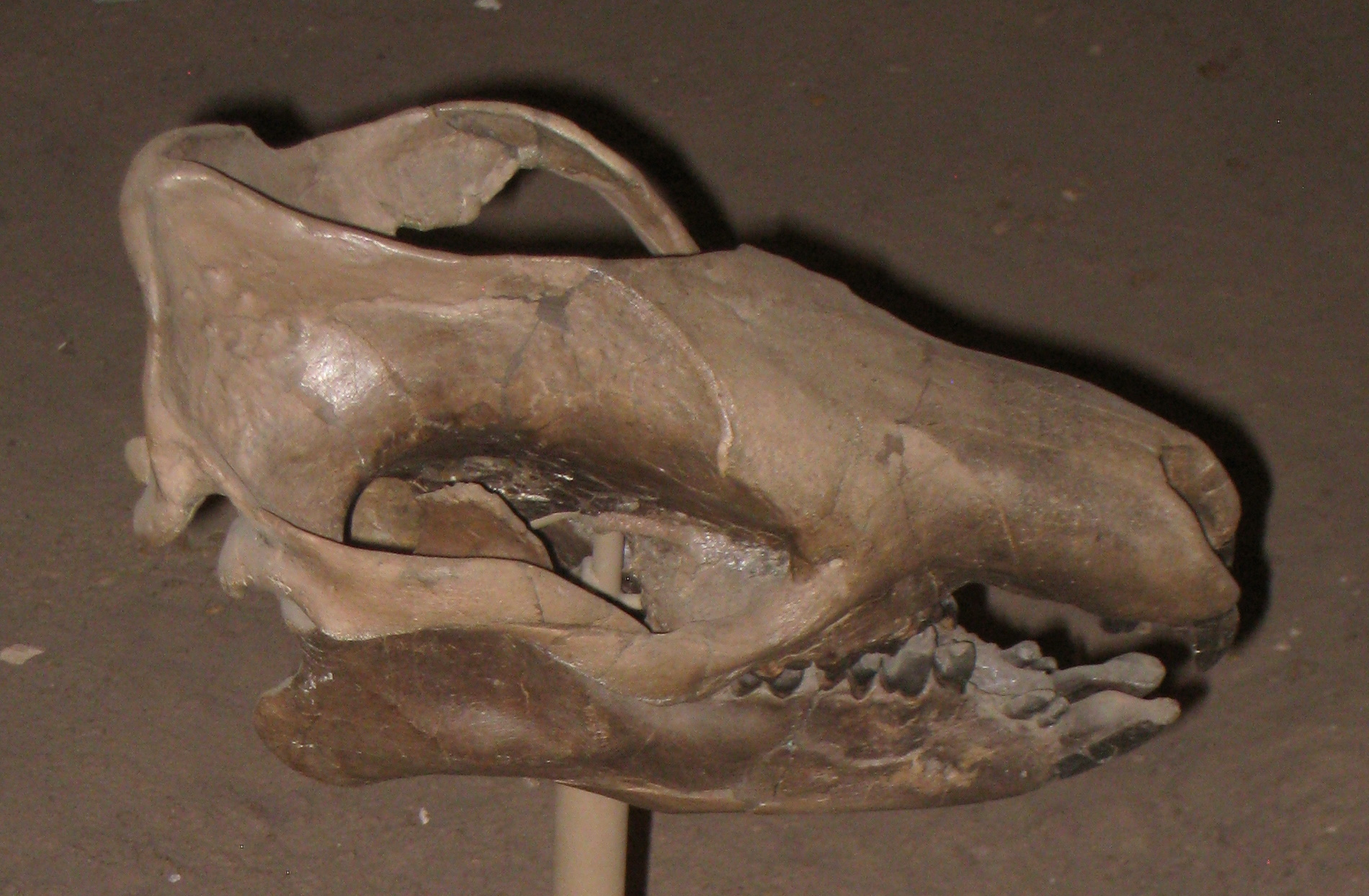
Skull of Trogosus hyracoides at the National Museum of Natural History

The cranium ranged in length from 5 to 37 cm (2.0 to 14.6 in). The rostrum (snout) is rather long and narrow from side-to-side. The lower jaw has an elongated and fused mandibular symphysis (the contact point between each side of the lower jaw). The basicranial region (behind the eyes) is short (from front-to-back) but broad. It probably attached to large jaw muscles, since it has deep temporal fossae, flared zygomatic arches, and a sagittal crest.

==== Teeth ====
Tillodonts have distinctively large and chisel-shaped incisors with restricted enamel, convergently similar to rodents and rabbits. The second upper and lower incisors are the largest teeth in the skull, while the first and third incisors are small or absent. Behind the incisors, the canines and first two premolars are also reduced or absent, leaving a wide diastema (gap) between the incisors and the cheek teeth.

The upper molars are quadrate (square-shaped), having evolved a fourth major cusp, the hypocone. Many tillodont species have dilambdodont upper molars, with a W-shaped crest connecting between the stylar shelf, paracone, and metacone. The lower molars have a trigonid (front area with a trio of large cusps) which is low, only slightly taller than the talonid (rear crushing "heel"). The fourth upper and lower premolars are molariform (molar-like).

In later tillodonts of the subfamily Trogosinae, the teeth develop to further extremes. The incisors become ever-growing teeth without distinct roots, while the cheek teeth become increasingly hypsodont (high-crowned, similar to horses, as an adaptation to a gritty diet).

=== Postcrania ===
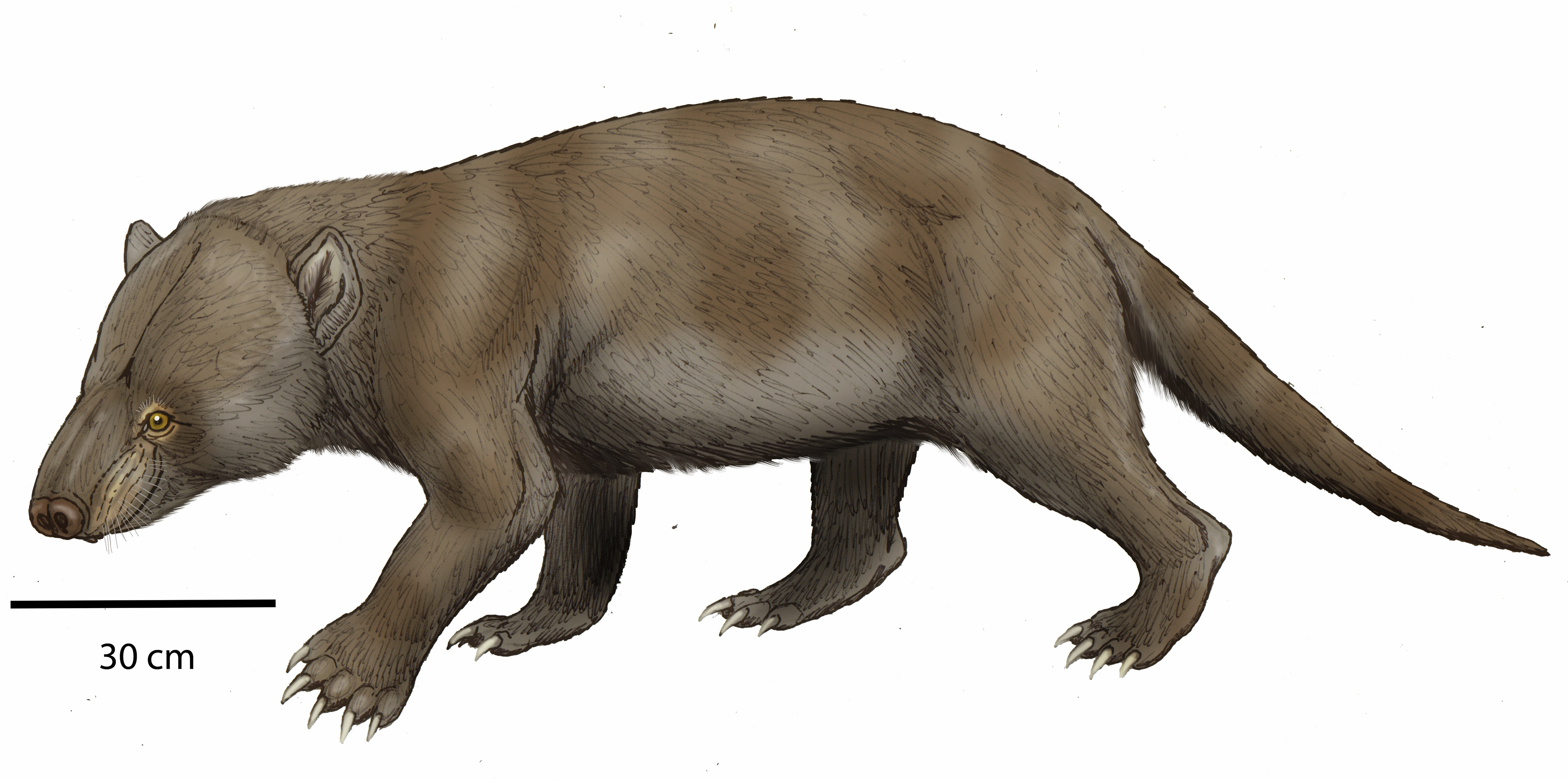
Life restoration of Trogosus hyracoides.

Tillodont skeletons are stocky but generalized, with clawed five-fingered paws and muscular limbs. Early tillodonts may have had scansorial habits, comfortable both climbing and foraging on the ground. Later members of the group were almost certainly fully terrestrial. Tillodonts were mostly medium-sized animals, although the largest of them (such as Trogosus) could reach the size of a large bear.

== Classification ==
=== Affinities ===
Tillodonts have long been considered enigmatic and difficult to compare to living mammals. When Marsh (1875) first named and described the tillodonts, he explained:

These animals are among the most remarkable yet discovered in American strata, and seem to combine characters of several distinct groups, viz: Carnivores, Ungulates, and Rodents. In Tillotherium Marsh [=Trogosus], the type [specimen] of the order, the skull has the same general form as in the Bears, but its structure resembles that of Ungulates. The molar teeth are of the ungulate type, the canines are small, and in each jaw there is a pair of large scalpriform incisors faced with enamel, and growing from persistent pulps, as in Rodents.

When naming his new "pachyderm" species Trogosus castoridens ("beaver-toothed gnawing-hog"), Leidy (1871) added that it was a fossil "which would appear to have pertained to the stock from which diverged the Rhinoceros and Mastodon, the Peccary, and perhaps the Beaver."

For much of their history, tillodonts were compared to "condylarths", a broad category of Paleocene-Eocene mammals potentially ancestral to hoofed mammals or carnivorans. The omnivorous arctocyonids were particularly frequent comparisons among "condylarths". Another perspective considers tillodonts to be closely related to pantodonts, another group of Paleocene-Eocene mammals with similar habits and distribution. Deltatherium, an odd mammal from Early Paleocene North America, has some similarities to tillodonts. Tillodonts show a combination of uniquely derived adaptations and very generalized traits, complicating comparisons to other mammals.

=== Subgroups ===
Franchaius from the early Eocene of Europe, Benaius, Lofochaius, Meiostylodon, and Huananius from the early Paleocene of China, and Yuesthonyx from the late Paleocene of China are primitive forms. Interogale from the late Paleocene of China, and Anchilestes probably from the middle Paleocene of China, were once assigned to Anagalida, but may also be primitive tillodonts.

The monophyly of the subfamily Trogosinae is unchallenged, but Esthonychinae most likely includes the ancestors of Trogosinae and therefore is probably paraphyletic. Tillodontia is mostly known from dentaries and teeth. The cranium is best known from Trogosinae and the postcranium from Trogosus.

Azygonyx and Esthonyx from North America, Franchaius and Plesiesthonyx from Europe, and Basalina from Pakistan are all morphologically closely related but obviously geographically quite widespread. In contrast, Asian tillodonts tend to be smaller and less derived. This possible link between specimens from Pakistan and Europe with those from North America adds evidence to a faunal interchange between these continents during the early Eocene.

Order Tillodontia

- Genus †Azygonyx (Gingerich 1989), dentary, postcranial fragments
- Genus †Basalina (Dehm & Oettingen-Spielberg 1958), poorly preserved jaw fragment with incomplete cheek tooth
- Genus †Benaius (Wang & Jin 2004), left lower jaw
- Genus †Chungchienia (Chow 1963),
- Genus †Dysnoetodon (Zhang 1980), maxilla and lower jaw
- Family †Esthonychidae (Cope 1883) (Syn. Anchippodontidae, Tillotheriidae)
  - Genus †Adapidium (Young 1937), right lower jaw
  - Subfamily †Esthonychinae (Zittel & Schlosser 1911)
    - Genus †Esthonyx (Cope 1874), lower mandibles, teeth
    - Genus †Megalesthonyx (Rose 1972), left mandible, teeth, feet bones
  - Subfamily †Trogosinae (Gazin 1953) (Syn. Anchippodus)
    - Genus †Tillodon (Gazin 1953), skull
    - Genus †Trogosus (Leidy 1871) (Syn. Tillotherium), skull, lower jaws, teeth, vertebrae, ilium, limb bones, feet bones
- Genus †Franchaius (Baudry 1992; synonymized with Plesiesthonyx, Hooker 2010), less than 20 isolated teeth
- Genus †Higotherium (Miyata & Tomida 1998), fragmentary right mandible, teeth
- Genus †Interogale (Huang & Zheng 1983), well-preserved mandible
- Genus †Kuanchuanius (Chow 1963), partial mandible, teeth
- Genus †Lofochaius (Chow et al. 1973), poorly preserved skull with few teeth
- Genus †Meiostylodon (Wang 1975), three isolated teeth
- Genus †Plesiesthonyx (Lemoine 1891), isolated molars
- Genus †Plethorodon (Huang & Zheng 1987), partial skull with upper cheek teeth
- Genus †Simplodon (Huang & Zheng 2003), right upper jaw with cheek teeth
- Family †Yuesthonychidae (Tong, Wang & Fu 2003)
  - Genus †Yuesthonyx (Tong, Wang & Fu 2003), left mandibles, partial skull, teeth
