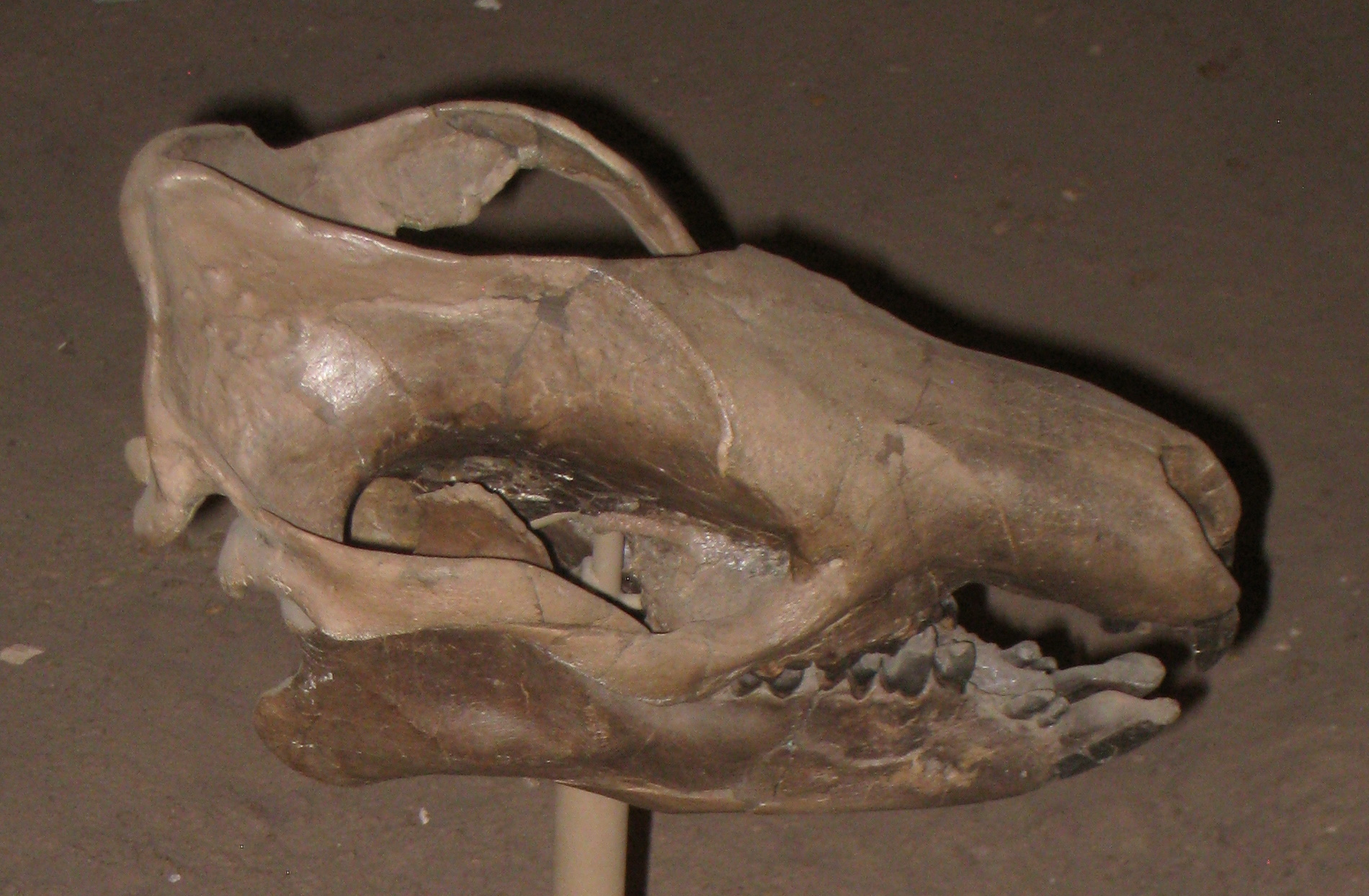
- Trogosus hyracoides skull at the National Museum of Natural History

Scientific classification
- Kingdom: Animalia
- Phylum: Chordata
- Class: Mammalia
- Order: †Tillodontia
- Family: †Esthonychidae
- Subfamily: †Trogosinae
- Genus: †Trogosus; Leidy 1871

Species
- †T. castoridens (type); †T. gazini; †T. grangeri; †T. hillsii; †T. hyracoides; †T. latidens

= Trogosus =

Trogosus Temporal range: Early Eocene–Middle Eocene

Extinct genus of mammals

Trogosus is an extinct genus of tillodont mammal. Fossils have been found in Wyoming, California, and British Columbia, and date from the Eocene between 54.8 and 33.7 million years ago.

== Description ==
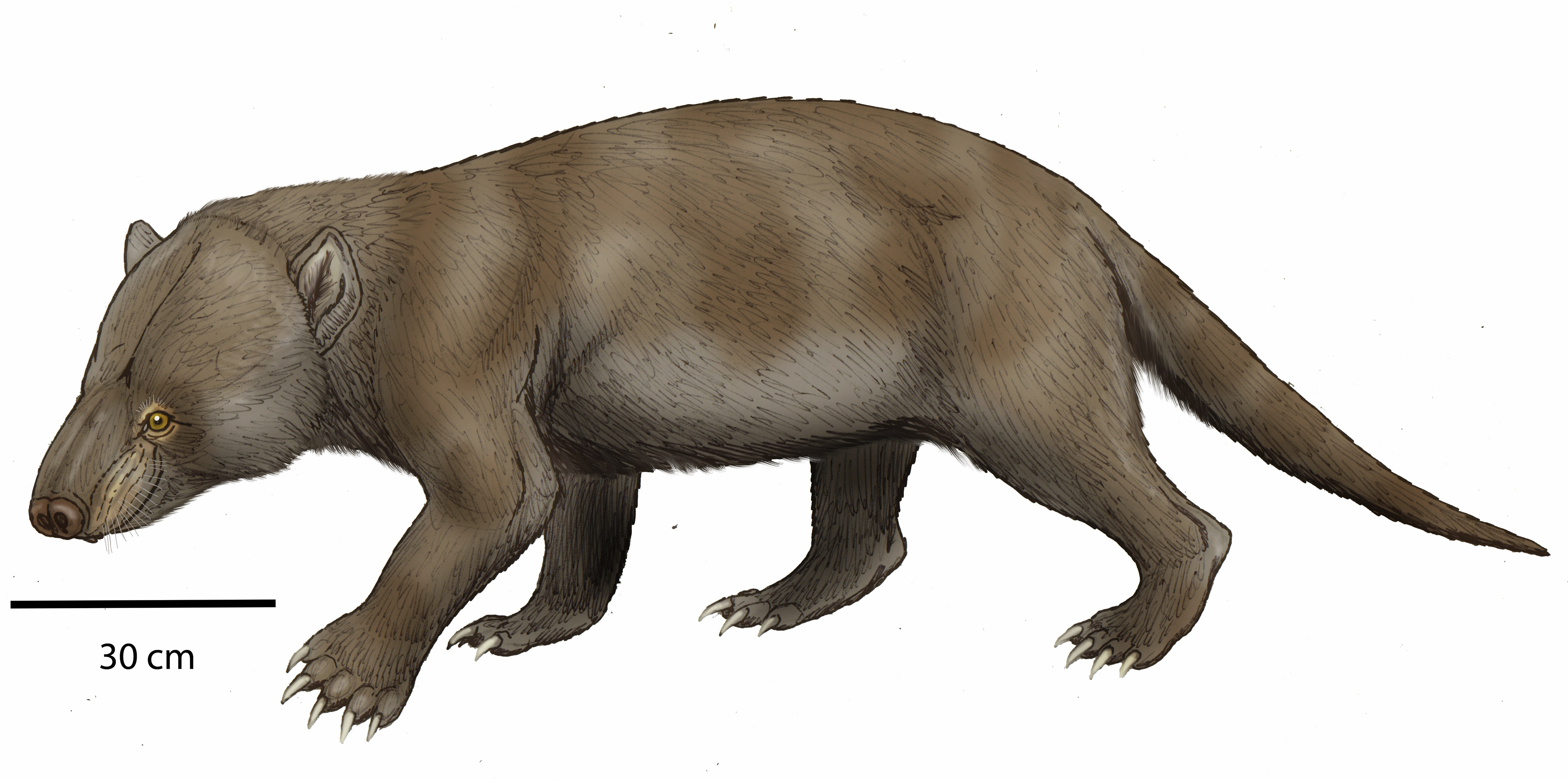
Life restoration

Trogosus was a bear-like herbivore with a large, short skull and flat feet, and had a skull 35 cm (14 in) long with an estimated body weight of 150 kg (330 lb). It had large, rodent-like incisors, which continued growing throughout the creature's life. Judging from the heavily worn molar teeth, Trogosus fed on rough plant material, such as roots and tubers. Trogosus possessed an exposed midbrain, a small neocortex, an orbitotemporal canal ventral to rhinal fissure, large olfactory bulbs, and a broad circular fissure. Its tiny neocortex relative to contemporary carnivorans and artiodactyls may have disadvantaged it when escaping predation by the former and competing for resources with the latter.
