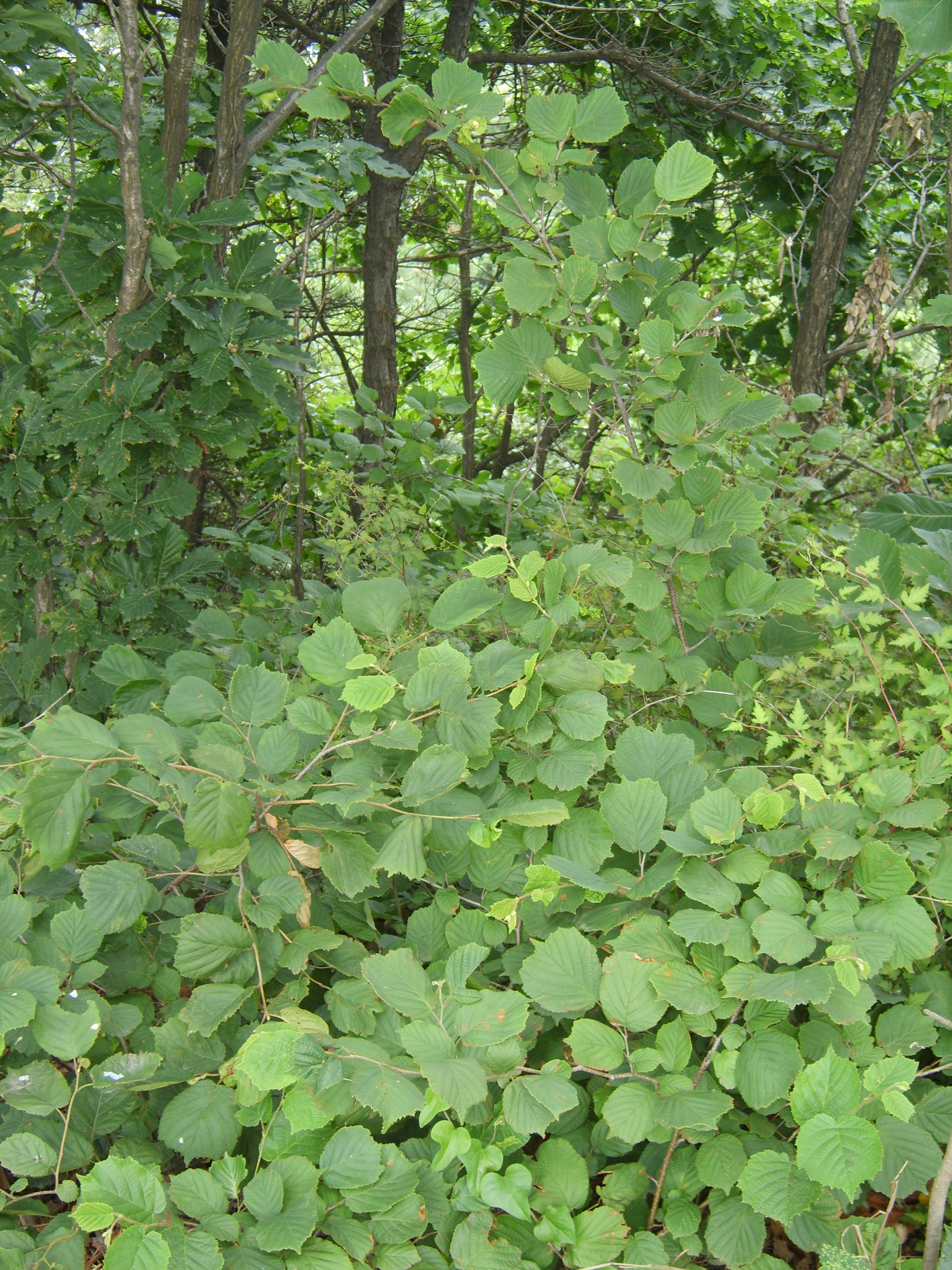

Conservation status
- Least Concern (IUCN 3.1)

Scientific classification
- Kingdom: Plantae
- Clade: Embryophytes
- Clade: Tracheophytes
- Clade: Angiosperms
- Clade: Eudicots
- Clade: Rosids
- Order: Fagales
- Family: Betulaceae
- Genus: Corylus
- Species: C. heterophylla

Binomial name
- Corylus heterophylla Fisch. ex Trautv.

= Corylus heterophylla =

Asian hazel

Species of tree

Corylus heterophylla, the Asian hazel, is a species of hazel native to eastern Asia in northern and central China, Korea, Japan, and southeastern Siberia.

== Description ==
It is a deciduous shrub or small tree growing to 7 m (23 ft) tall, with stems up to 20 cm (8 in) thick grey bark. The leaves are rounded, 4–13 cm (1 1/2–5 in) long and 2.5–10 cm (1–4 in) broad, with a coarsely double-serrated to somewhat lobed margin and an often truncated apex. The flowers are wind-pollinated catkins; the male (pollen) catkins are pale yellow, 4 cm (1 1/2 in) long, while the female catkins are bright red and only 1–3 mm (1/16–1/8 in) long. The fruit is a nut produced in clusters of 2–6 together; each nut is 0.7–1.5 cm (1/4–1/2 in) diameter, partly enclosed in a 1.5–2.5 cm (1/2–1 in) long, bract-like involucre (husk).

It is very similar to the closely related common hazel (C. avellana) of Europe and western Asia, differing in the leaves being somewhat more lobed.

== Uses ==
The nut is edible, and is very similar to the common hazel nut; it is cultivated commercially in China.
