= Hyaenodictis =

Hyaenodictis Temporal range: Early Eocene (Ypresian), 55–48 Ma

Scientific classification
- Kingdom: Animalia
- Phylum: Chordata
- Class: Mammalia
- Infraclass: Placentalia
- Order: †Mesonychia
- Family: †Mesonychidae
- Genus: †Hyaenodictis; Lemoine, 1880

Type species
- †Hyaenodictis filholi

Other species
- †H. blayaci Solé et al., 2023; †H. progressus Solé et al., 2023; †H. raslanloubatieri Solé et al., 2023; †H. rougierae Solé et al., 2023; †H. willwoodensis Solé et al., 2023

Extinct genus of mesonychian

Hyaenodictis is a monophyletic extinct genus of mesonychid that inhabited Europe and North America during the Early Eocene. Initially, this genus was thought to have been synonymous with Dissacus, however recent analysis had found differentiations in their dentition and postcranial, which resulted in the revival of Hyaenodictis.

Hyaenodictis would have been contemporary with Pachyaena, dominating south-western Europe, while the latter roamed north-western Europe. Following the extinction of Pachyaena, Hyaenodictis would later dispersed into north-western Europe. Hyaenodictis was believed to have disperse into North America roughly 55 Ma, which gave rise to H. willwoodensis. The appearance of H. willwoodensis coincided with the extinction of Dissacus praenuntius, which may have been the result of competitive replacement.

Hyaenodictis was the last known European mesonychid, going extinct roughly 48 Ma during the Ypresian-Lutetian Mammal Turnover event. The regional extinction of mesonychids saw the diversification in hyaenodonts species and an increase in body sizes.

== Taxonomy ==
Phylogenetic modeling had recovered Dissacus as a paraphyletic genus of mesonychid. Following the discovery of D. zanabazari, Geisler et al. (2007) performed phylogenetic analysis on mesonychians. Within mesonychid, Dissacus argenteus and Dissacus willwoodensis were recovered as basal lineages of mesonychids. On the other hand, other Dissacus species within the analysis were found to be more closely related to Sinonyx, Pachyaena, Harpagolestes, Synoplotherium, and Mesonyx.

Following the discovery of H. raslanloubatieri and D. rougierae, Solé et al. (2018) performed the first phylogenetic analysis that exclusively focused on relationship of mesonychids. Dissacus as a paraphyletic genus. Most European species of Dissacus within the European Dissacus clade, with D. willwoodensis being recovered as a sister taxon to that clade. D. europaeus, the oldest European species, was recovered to not be closely related to the clade as it didn't have typical features within the clade such as the reduction of m3.

In their 2023 paper, Solé and colleagues reanalyzed European Dissacus clade species and revived Hyaenodictis as a distinct genus. Other than the type species H. filholi, European species included H. blayaci, H. progressus, H. rougierae, and H. raslanloubatieri. In addition, they found the genus had one North American species, H. willwoodensis. Their analysis recovered Hyaenodictis as a monophyletic group within the mesonychid family.

== Description ==
=== Size ===
H. willwoodensis was estimated to have weighed 9.3–10.63 kg (20.5–23.4 lb) based on m2 regressions, making it larger than most North American Dissacus species. H. rougierae was even smaller, estimated to have weighed 4.46–9.27 kg (9.8–20.4 lb) based on astragalus and dental specimens respectively. H. filholi, the type species, was estimated to be 25% larger than Dissacus europaeus and 29% larger than H. rougierae being nearly the same size as H. raslanloubatieri. H. raslanloubatieri size varied widely based methods used. H. raslanloubatieri was estimated to have weighed 9.92–16.93 kg (21.9–37.3 lb). On the other hand, astragalus and ulna suggested a significantly smaller body mass of 8.25–8.41 kg (18.2–18.5 lb). Mass estimates based on humerus greatest length suggests H. raslanloubatieri weighed 12.7–24.27 kg (28.0–53.5 lb). H. blayaci and H. progressus were the largest species within the genus 40 kg (88 lb) and 60 kg (130 lb) respectively, making one of the largest known mesonychids. Solé et al. (2023) estimated H. blayaci weighed 37–41 kg (82–90 lb), while H. progressus weighed 79 kg (174 lb).

=== Postcranial anatomy ===
The lumbar vertebrae of H. raslanloubatieri was almost complete. The anterior and posterior faces of the vertebral body were found to have been slightly concaved. The lumbar vertebrae was noted to be taller dorsoventrally than anteroposteriorly long in lateral view. The overall body of the vertebrae was longer anteroposteriorly than dorsoventrally, with the ventral edge of the vertebral body being conceived ventrally in the sagittal plane.

== Extinction ==
European Hyaenodictis went extinct roughly 48 Ma, at the end of the Ypresian, which coincided with the Ypresian-Lutetian Mammal Turnover event. Their extinction likely coincided with the cooling period following the end of the Early Eocene Climatic Optimum. Following the extinction of mesonychids and oxyaenids, hyaenodonts saw an increase in diversification and body sizes, with some such as Cartierodon grew large, weighing 29 kg (64 lb).
