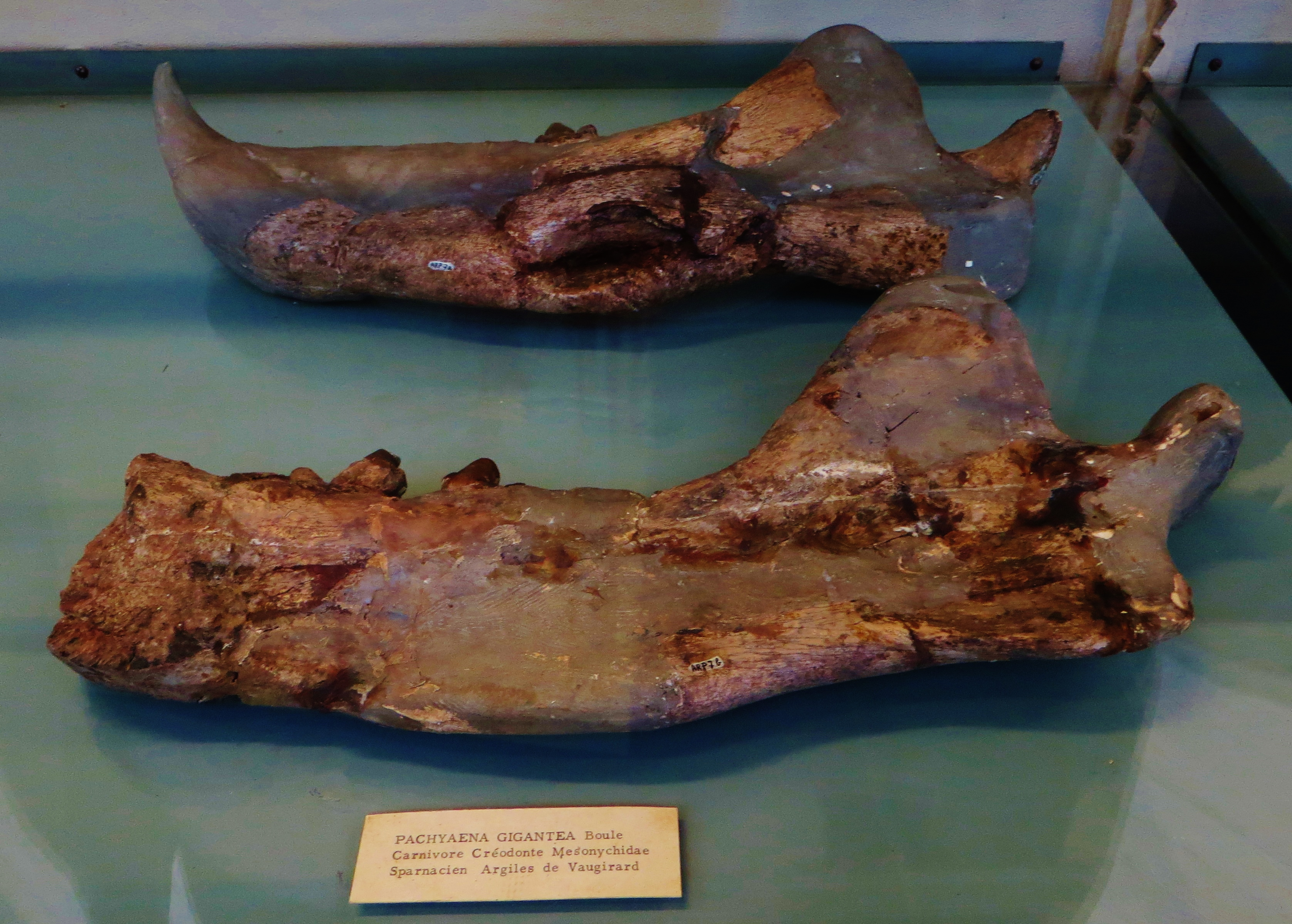
- Pachyaena gigantea jaws

Scientific classification
- Kingdom: Animalia
- Phylum: Chordata
- Class: Mammalia
- Order: †Mesonychia
- Family: †Mesonychidae
- Genus: †Pachyaena; Cope, 1874

Type species
- †Pachyaena ossifraga Cope, 1874

Other species
- P. gigantea; P. nemegetica; P. gracilis

= Pachyaena =

Pachyaena Temporal range: Late Paleocene-Middle Eocene (Thanetian to Lutetian), 57.5–42.7 Ma

Genus of extinct mammals

Pachyaena (literally, "thick hyena") was a Paleocene genus of heavily built, relatively short-legged mesonychids. The genus may be paraphyletic or monophyletic. Mesonychids were part of a now extinct order of mammals known as Mesonychia, an early group that evolved before modern ungulates or carnivorans, had some similar features to both, and may have been the first large mammals to regularly eat meat.

The genus first appeared in East Asia during the Gashatan ALMA (Asian Land Mammal Age) of the Late Paleocene. Pachyaena would disperse into North America via the Bering land bridge. From North America, it would disperse into Northwestern Europe via the North Atlantic land bridge. However, its presence in Europe was notably short, lasting only 500,000 years. The genus disappears from the fossil record following a faunal turnover event, and was later replaced by Hyaenodictis. In North America, Pachyaena would go extinct around 52.8 Ma. The last population of Pachyaena so far discovered is in the Lushi Formation, which dates to the Irdinmanhan faunal stage (47.8–42.7 Ma).

== Taxonomy ==
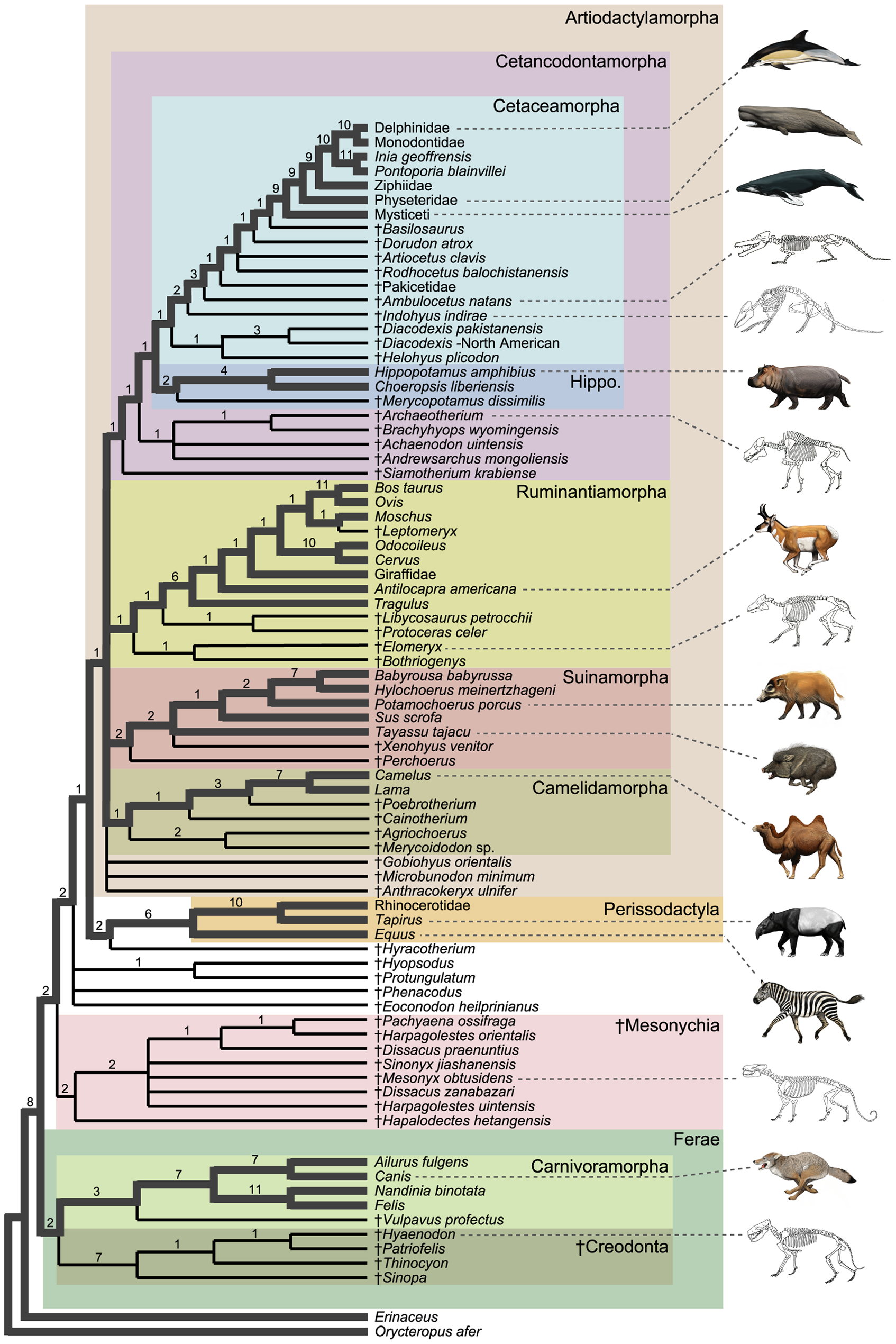
Cladogram showing the position of the Mesonychia

The cladistic validity of the genus is uncertain. A 2007 paper by Geisler and colleagues suggested Pachyaena may be a paraphyletic genus, with P. ossifraga being closer to Synoplotherium, Harpagolestes and Mesonyx than to P. gigantea. In a 2018 paper, Solé et al. also recovered Pachyaena as paraphyletic. Their analysis suggested instead that P. ossifraga was closely related to Dissacus serior, within the Mesonyx clade. In a more recent study, the same authors analyzed new fossil material and contradicted these findings, recovering P. gigantea as a sister taxon to P. ossifraga, which would make the genus valid as monophyletic.

The oldest species within the genus was P. nemegetica, known from Late Paleocene strata in Mongolia. However, the greatest diversity was seen in North America, with P. ossifraga (P. intermedia is considered synonymous with this species), P. gigantea, and P. gracilis all being known from Early Eocene strata of Wyoming. P. ossifraga is also known from the earliest Wasatchian.

Spaulding et al. (2009) did a cladistic analysis of mesonychians, which recovers the entire order outside of ungulates, and places Pachyaena as a derived genus of mesonychid, most closely related to Harpagolestes.

- - - †Hapalodectes
    - - †Sinonyx
      - †Mesonyx
      - †Harpagolestes uintensis
      - †Dissacus zanabazari
      - - †Dissacus praenuntius
        - - †Harpagolestes orientalis
          - †Pachyaena
  - - †Protungulatum
    - - Perissodactyla
      - Artiodactyla
        - Tylopoda
        - - Suina
          - - Ruminantia
            - - †Entelodontidae
              - - - †Anthracotheriidae
                  - Hippopotamidae
                - - †Raoellidae
                  - Cetacea

== Description ==
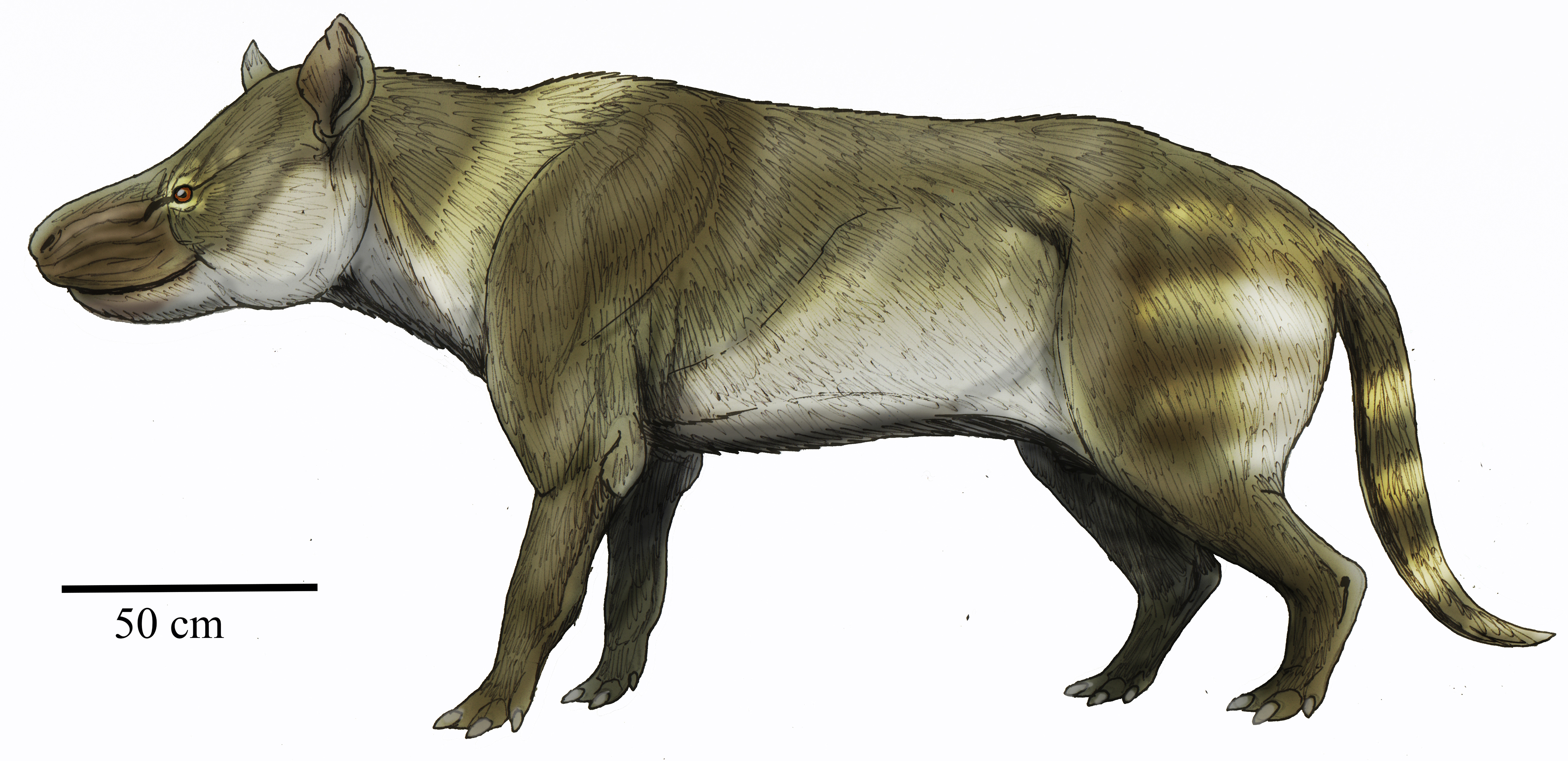
Restoration of P. gigantea

=== Size ===
Pachyaena species were among the largest known mammals from the Early Eocene. P. gracilis was roughly the size of a wolf, with a mean body mass of 36 kg (79 lb), making it larger than most Wasatchian mammals. The larger species within the genus were about the size of moderately sized bears. The largest species was P. gigantea, which has been reconstructed as having a mean mass of 191 kg (421 lb), and a range of 129–396 kg (284–873 lb), making it the larger than all other Wasatchian mammals except panodonts and taeniodonts. Zhou et al. estimated that P. ossifraga may have weighed between 60–70 kg (130–150 lb), with a mean body mass of 62 kg (137 lb). They found little size variation between individuals, suggesting that P. ossifraga had no sexual dimorphism based on size. Another study reconstructed larger sizes for P. ossifraga: average body mass of 78 kg (172 lb), and the largest individuals reaching up to 93 kg (205 lb).

=== Postcranial anatomy ===
Analysis of both dental and body anatomy supports the idea that Pachyaena and other mesonychids evolved from the Arctocyonidae. Like arctocyonids, species of Pachyaena varied but were heavily-built animals; the overall body shape of the genus would have resembled a modern tapir. However, the humerus exhibited many characteristics of cursoriality, suggesting these animals did run, but were built for endurance rather than speed. The greater tuberosity is prominent and projects above of the head, although less so in P. gracilis than in larger species. This characteristic is seen in modern ungulates and carnivores specialized for running. Despite being relatively heavy, the humeral shaft and articular surfaces are modified to reduce most muscular prominences. This increases the efficiency of movement, by limiting movement of the limb to the sagittal plane (back-and-forth running movement without the ability to turn the legs out sideways, as in grabbing objects, sculling in water, or climbing).

The scapula of Pachyaena has been recovered, however even the most complete scapula was fragmented and incomplete. The glenoid fossa was symmetrically pyriform within the genus. Within the larger species, it was three-fourths as wide as it is long. In P. gracilis, it was found to have been somewhat narrow compared to the larger species. Compared to Canis, the suprascapular notch was relatively shallow.

== Paleobiology ==
=== Locomotion ===
Analysis of three wolf to bear-sized species from the early Eocene of Wyoming (Willwood Formation) indicates they all had many adaptations for running, including paraxonic compressed feet with a vestigial first digit, lower sections of the limbs elongated compared with the upper sections, and limb joints with movement mostly restricted to a sagittal plane. All these characteristics are common to both ungulates that run to escape predators and carnivores that run to pursue prey, though they probably evolved independently in mesonychids. Some adaptations are more typical of the grade of cursorial carnivores; others are more specialized for running, as in ungulates. Compared to cursorial carnivorans such as spotted hyenas, Pachyaena was relatively short-limbed, suggesting it couldn’t have attained the speeds seen in hyenas. Pachyaena was found to have plantigrade or secondarily subdigitgrade locomotion, generally walking on the soles of its feet like a bear.

=== Predatory behavior ===
Whether or not Pachyaena hunted prey has also been discussed by experts. Szalay & Gould (1966) suggested Pachyaena did hunt, as the teeth had adaptations for piercing and chewing flesh, though not at the level seen in modern carnivores. Zhou et al. (1992) noted Pachyaena lacked both true carnassials for slicing meat and skin, and claws for tearing open fresh carcasses, and argued that the genus wasn't physically able to hunt live prey or consume freshly dead animals. They found it unlikely that fish, turtles, mollusks, or other animals could have been prey, because the limbs had no adaptations for either swimming or grasping. The large size of Pachyaena individuals compared with other mammals of its time suggests that its cursorial adaptations weren't to run from larger predators, as its size alone would've ensured safety. Instead, they suggested Pachyaena and other large mesonychids had a diet that included searching out and taking over carrion, and did not hunt fresh meat.

The dental microwear patterns of Pachyaena show that it processed large, irregular objects. They resemble those of the extant spotted (or laughing) hyaena Crocuta. This suggests that like Crocuta, Pachyaena had an osteophagous diet. Zhou et al. (1992) suggested Pachyaena probably wasn’t an hypercarnivore due to the lack of carnassials for eating fresh meat and its not particularly fast locomotion. On the other hand, Szalay & Gould (1966) analyzed the tooth morphology of mesonychids and reconstructed P. gracilis as an hypercarnivore, while P. gigantea was reconstructed as a carnivorous omnivore, feeding on a broad range of foods that included meat, similar to modern black and brown bears. Later studies have reconstructed all species of Pachyaena as carnivorous omnivores.
