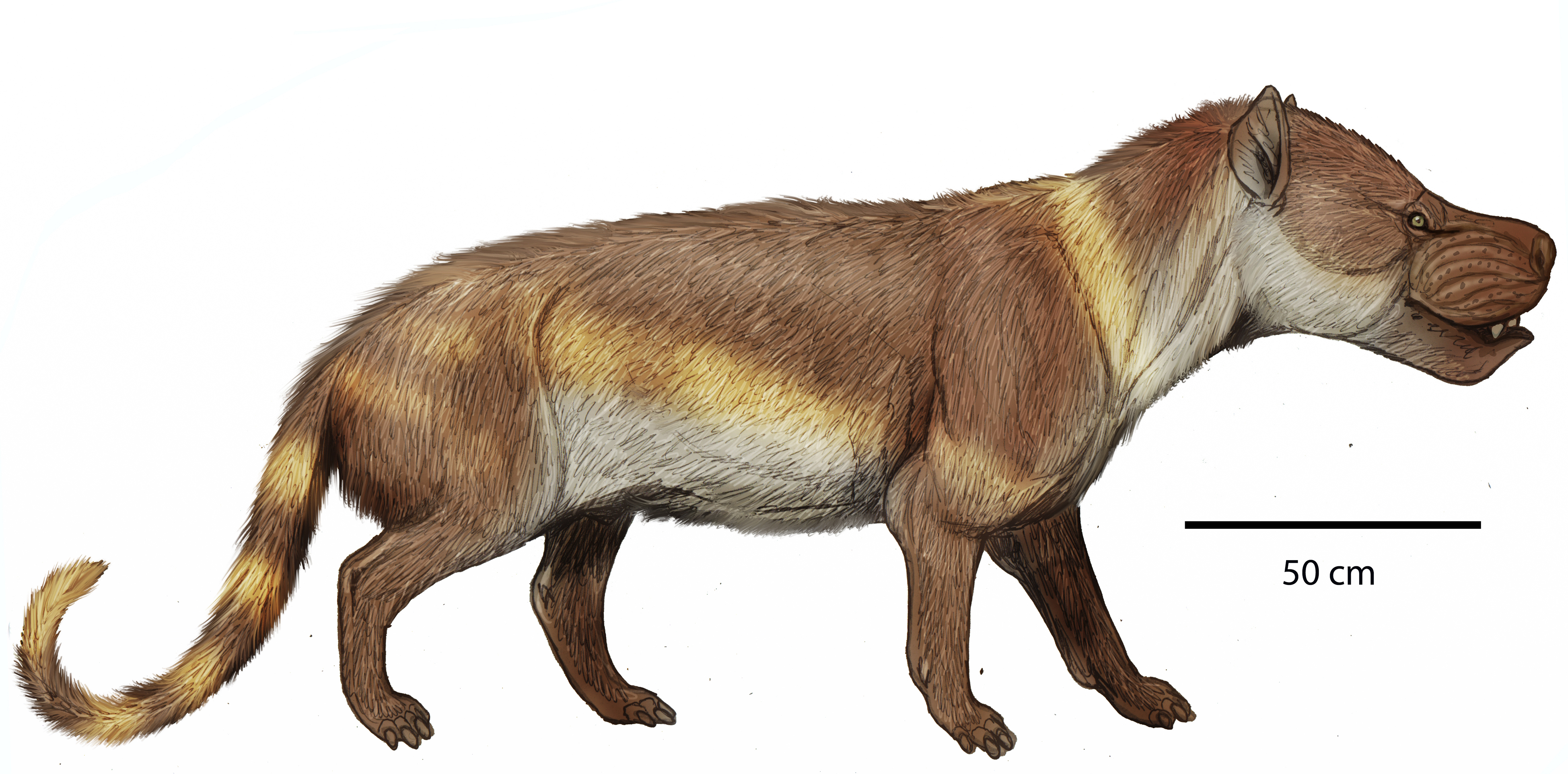
- M. hadrodens

Scientific classification
- Kingdom: Animalia
- Phylum: Chordata
- Class: Mammalia
- Order: †Mesonychia
- Family: †Mesonychidae
- Genus: †Mongolestes

Type species
- Mongolestes hadrodens Szalay & Gould, 1966

Other Species
- M. alxaensis Jin, 2005

= Mongolestes =

Mongolestes Temporal range: Middle Eocene (Irdinmanhan to Ulangochuian), 47.8–37.8 Ma Possible Ergilian record

Extinct genus of mammals

Mongolestes ("Mongolian robber") is an extinct genus of mesonychid known from the Shara Murun, Ulan Gochu, and Lushi formations of Inner Mongolia. It was one the last surviving representatives of Mesonychia, going extinct in the earliest Late Eocene. However, there may be evidence of the genus persisting to the Ergilian of the Asian Land Mammal Age.

== Taxonomy ==
In the paper describing Mongolestes, Szalay and Gould classified the genus as a Mesonychidae, within the subfamily Mesonychinae. Solé et al. (2023) included M. hadrodens within their phylogenetic analysis of Mesonychia. Their phylogenetic model recovered Mongolestes as a sister taxon to Mongolonyx, with both genera being recovered within Mesonyx clade.

== Description ==
Mongolestes is distinct from other mesonychids in several dental features, including relatively large teeth and the loss of the third molar, and a mandibular symphysis that is steeper. Additionally, Mongolestes differs from Dissacus and Pachyaena in the absence of cingula on the upper teeth and lack of a metaconid on the trigonids of the lower cheek teeth.
