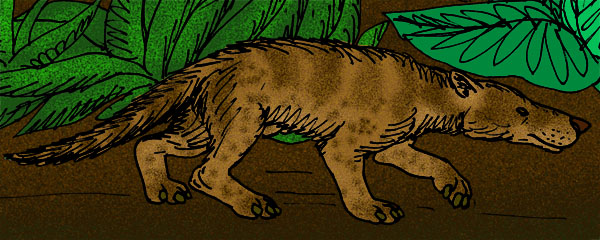
- Yantanglestes conexus

Scientific classification
- Kingdom: Animalia
- Phylum: Chordata
- Class: Mammalia
- Order: †Mesonychia
- Family: †Mesonychidae
- Genus: †Yantanglestes; Ideker and Yan, 1980

Type species
- †Lestes conexus

Species
- Y. conexus (Yan & Tang 1976); Y. datangensis (Yan & Tang 1976); Y. feiganensis (Chow et al 1973); Y. rotundus (Wang 1975)

Synonyms
- Dissacus feiganensis Chow et al 1973; Dissacus rotundus Wang 1975; Lestes Yan & Tang 1976; Notodissacus conexus Yan & Tang 1978

= Yantanglestes =

Yantanglestes Temporal range: Early-Middle Paleocene (Shanghuan to Nongshanian) 63–59.2 Ma

Extinct genus of carnivorous mammals

Yantanglestes is a genus of small, Chinese mesonychid with slender jaws that first appeared during the Early Paleocene. It was found throughout Asia. It is the oldest known mesonychid. Yantanglestes became extinct during the Nongshanian division of the Middle Paleocene, and lived sympatrically with its descendant genera, including Dissacus, Sinonyx and Jiangxia.
