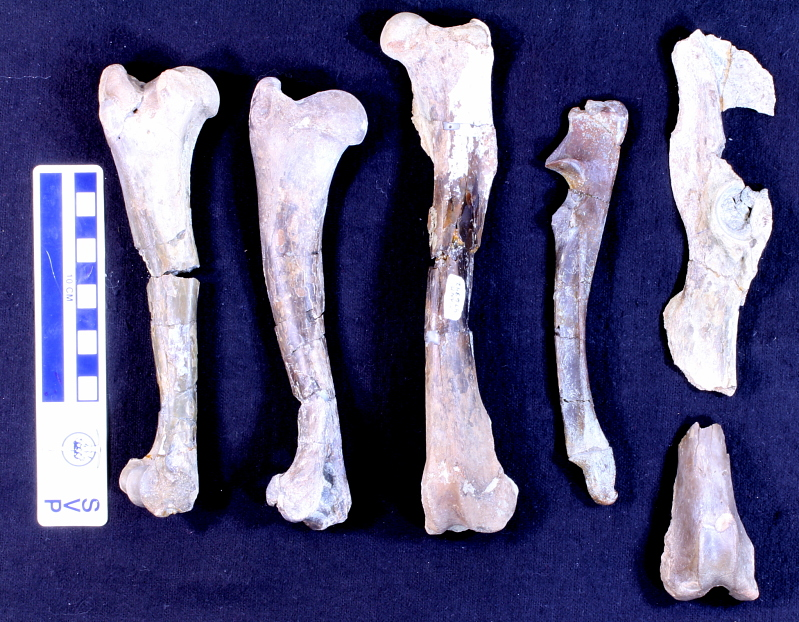
- Postcranial remains of M. obtusidens

Scientific classification
- Kingdom: Animalia
- Phylum: Chordata
- Class: Mammalia
- Order: †Mesonychia
- Family: †Mesonychidae
- Genus: †Mesonyx

Type species
- Mesonyx obtusidens Cope, 1872

Other species
- M. nuhetingensis Jin, 2012; M. uqbulakensis Tong, 1989

= Mesonyx =

Mesonyx Temporal range: Early-Middle Eocene (Ypresian to Lutetian), 53–42.8 Ma

Extinct genus of mammals

Mesonyx ("middle claw") is an extinct genus of mesonychid, one of two families that is part of the extinct order Mesonychia. Mesonychians were a clade of hoofed mammals closely related to ungulates, that first appeared in the fossil record during the Early Paleocene, roughly 63 million years ago. However, the order is thought to have arisen in the Late Cretaceous at least 66.7 Ma.

Fossils of the various species in both North America and East Asia. The North American species, M. obtusidens were found from Bridgerian to middle Uintan localities of the Early to Middle Eocene in North America. On the other hand, M. uqbulakensis and M. nuhetingensis, were exclusive to the Arshantan of the Early Eocene in East Asia.

Mesonychids within the Bridger Formation were thought to have been one of the top predators of the time along with crocodyliforms and the oxyaenid Patriofelis.

== Taxonomy ==
Mesonyx was the type genus of Mesonychidae, which was coined by Cope (1875). Cope (1875) classified mesonychids as carnivorans instead of "Creodonta" due to trochelar face of the astragalus is completely grooved above as seen with true carnivorans. However, Cope would later reclassify mesonychids as creodonts. In their 1966 paper, Van Valen removed mesonychids from creodonts and placed them within the order Condylarthra. Szalay and Gould (1966) would support this classification within their paper. In 1969, Van Valen would rank up mesonychids to an order known as Mesonychia.

Among species, Scott (1888) classified M. uintensis as a species of Mesonyx, however Obsorb (1924) would reclassify M. uintensis as a species of Harpagolestes. M. uqbulakensis from the Arshanto Formation of China was described by Tong (1989). Jin (2012) would recover another species of Mesonyx, M. nuhetingensis, within the same formation.

In their 2007 paper, Geisler et al. recovered Mesonyx within a clade with Harpagolestes and Synoplotherium. Solé et al. (2018) recovered Mesonyx within the Mesonyx clade, a clade of mesonychids, known almost exclusively from the Eocene. In their 2023 paper, Solé and colleagues recovered Mesonyx, to be a sister taxon to the clade containing Harpagolestes, Mongolonyx and Mongolestes.

Generally accepted cladogram by Spaulding et al. (2009):

- - - †Hapalodectes
    - - †Sinonyx
      - †Mesonyx
      - †Harpagolestes uintensis
      - †Dissacus zanabazari
      - - †Dissacus praenuntius
        - - †Harpagolestes orientalis
          - †Pachyaena
  - - †Protungulatum
    - - Perissodactyla
      - Artiodactyla
        - Tylopoda
        - - Suina
          - - Ruminantia
            - - †Entelodontidae
              - - - †Anthracotheriidae
                  - Hippopotamidae
                - - †Raoellidae
                  - Cetacea

== Description ==
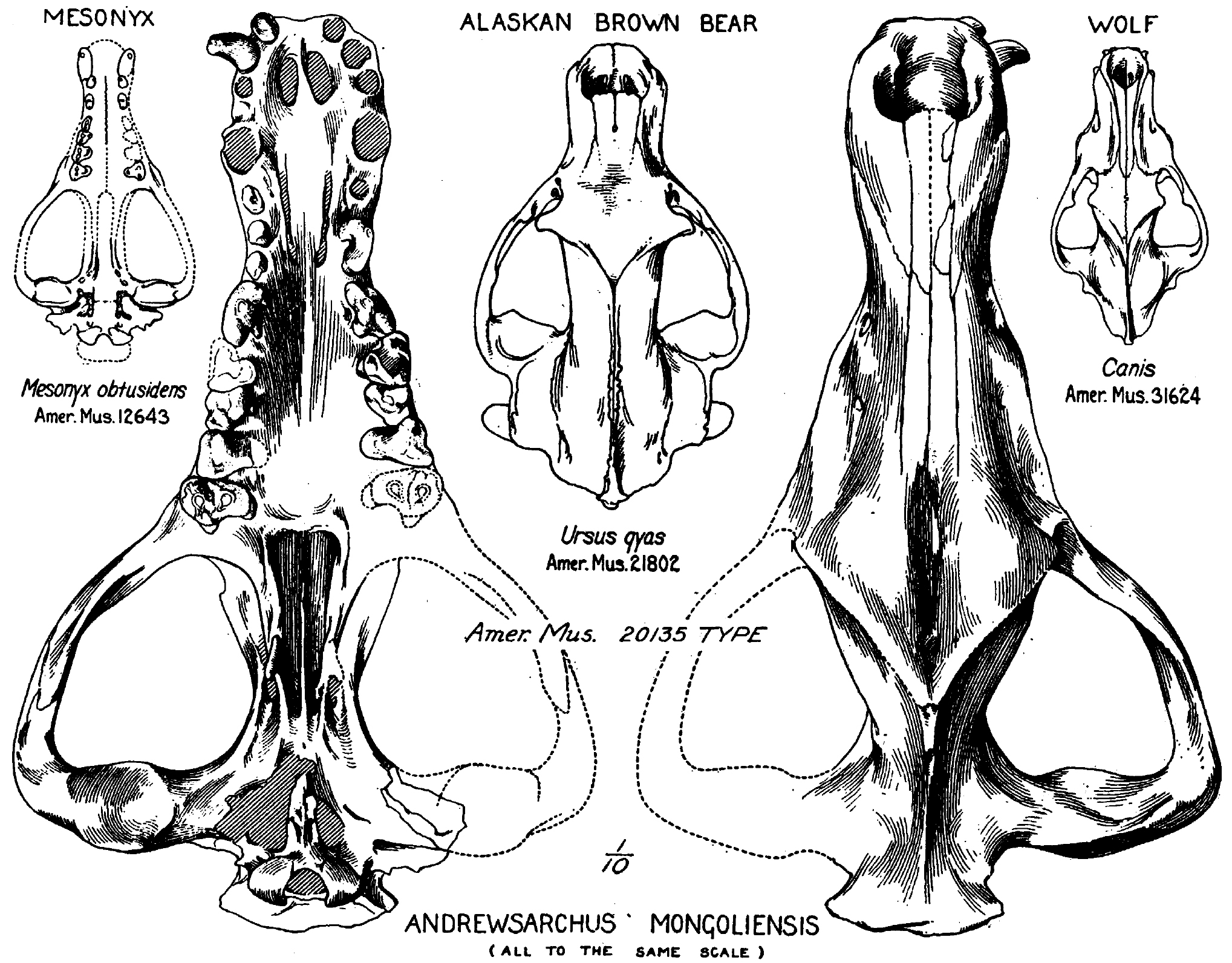
The skull of M. obtusidens (left), compared with skulls of a wolf, brown bear, and Andrewsarchus

M. obtusidens had a basal cranium length of 27.9 cm (11.0 in). Mesonyx species have been estimated as 1.25–1.5 m (4.1–4.9 ft) long in life, not including the tail. Weight estimates vary, from 20 to 55 kg (about 45-120 lbs). Like other mesonychids, the toes ended in small hooves. The long skull had a relatively large sagittal crest above the braincase to anchor large jaw muscles and give it a powerful bite. Brain casts show that M. obtusidens had an unusually well-developed neocortex for an Eocene mammal. Although modern Carnivora have more complex brains, their ancestors did not; Mesonyx species would have been intelligent animals for their time.

== Paleobiology ==
While this was the earliest genus of mesonychid to be named (by Edward Drinker Cope in 1872) and the group is named after it, Mesonyx was one of the most derived genera of mesonychids, evolving features for active running. These animals had a reduced sense of smell and likely relied on sight and hearing to find food.

== Paleoecology ==
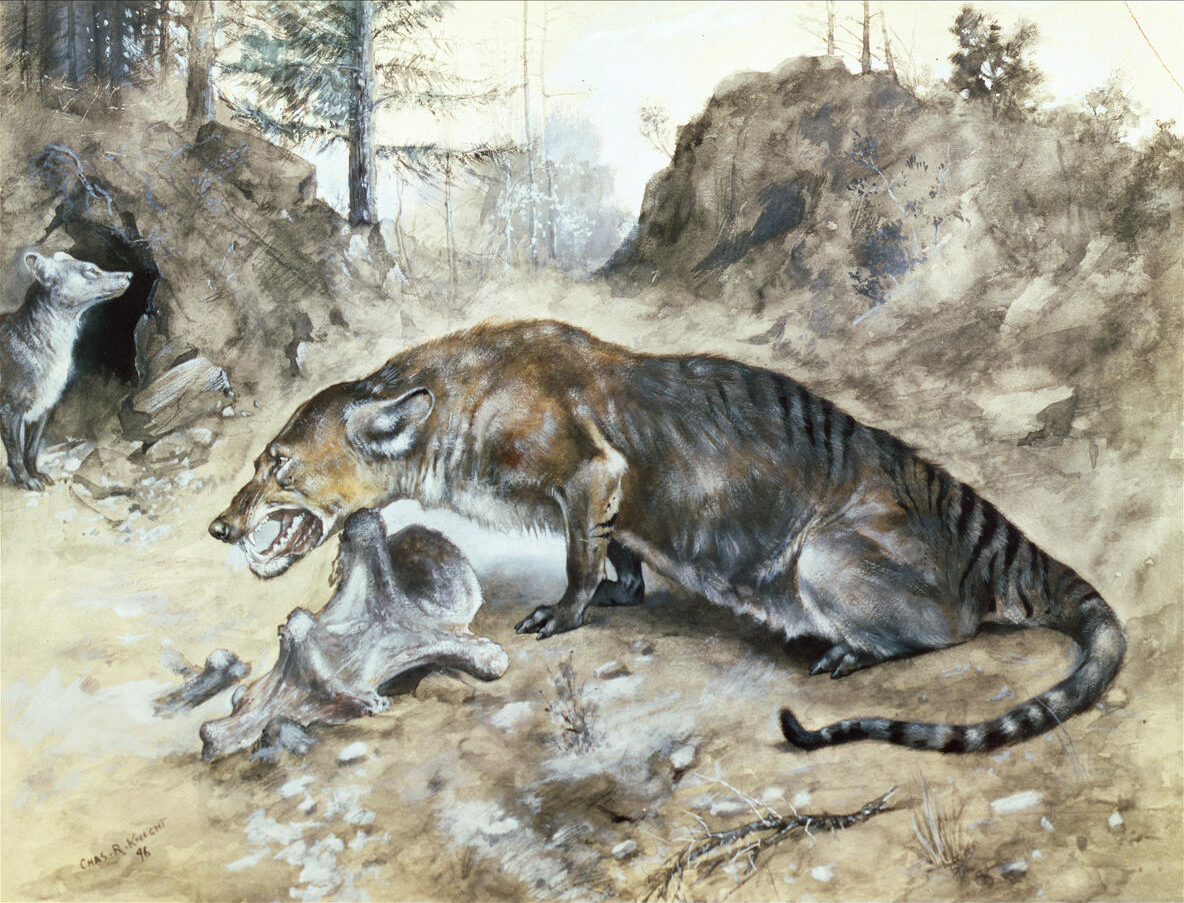
Life reconstruction by Charles R. Knight

Mesonyx species have been unearthed in Colorado, Wyoming, Utah and China. An additional two species – M. uqbulakensis and M. nuhetingensis – have been described from the Early Eocene Arshanto Formation in China.

M. obtusidens was first recovered in the Cottonwood Creek of the Black Fork Member (lower member) of the Bridger Formation of the Bridgerian faunal stage. The formation preserved an environment which alternated between marshlands with braided streams and vast yet shallow lakes based on depositional materials. Plant based evidence of palms, ferns, and Sequoia suggests the Bridger Formation, was a dense, paratropical forest, which was common in North America during the global hot climate of the Eocene. Mammals from the Black Fork Member were fellow mesonychid Harpagolestes, primates Anaptomorphus, Notharctus, Omomys, Trogolemur, Smilodectes, and Uintasorex, tillodonts Trogosus and Tillodon, pholidotans (pangolin relatives) Metacheiromys and Tetrapassalus mckennai, various rodents in the families Cylindrodontidae, Paramyidae, and Sciuravidae, hyaenodonts Limnocyon, Sinopa, Thinocyon, and Tritemnodon, oxyaenodonts Machaeroides and Patriofelis, carnivoraforms Miacis, Oodectes, Palaearctonyx, Uintacyon, Viverravus, and Vulpavus, the hyopsodont Hyopsodus, the dinoceratan Bathyopsis, the equid Orohippus, brontotheres Limnohyops and Palaeosyops, the helaletid Helaletes, the hyrachyid Hyrachyus, dichobunids Antiacodon and Microsus, and the helohyid Helohyus. Non-mammalian fauna included catfish, salamanders, frogs, varanid lizards, boas, turtles, several crocodyliforms, including the fully terrestrial Boverisuchus vorax.
