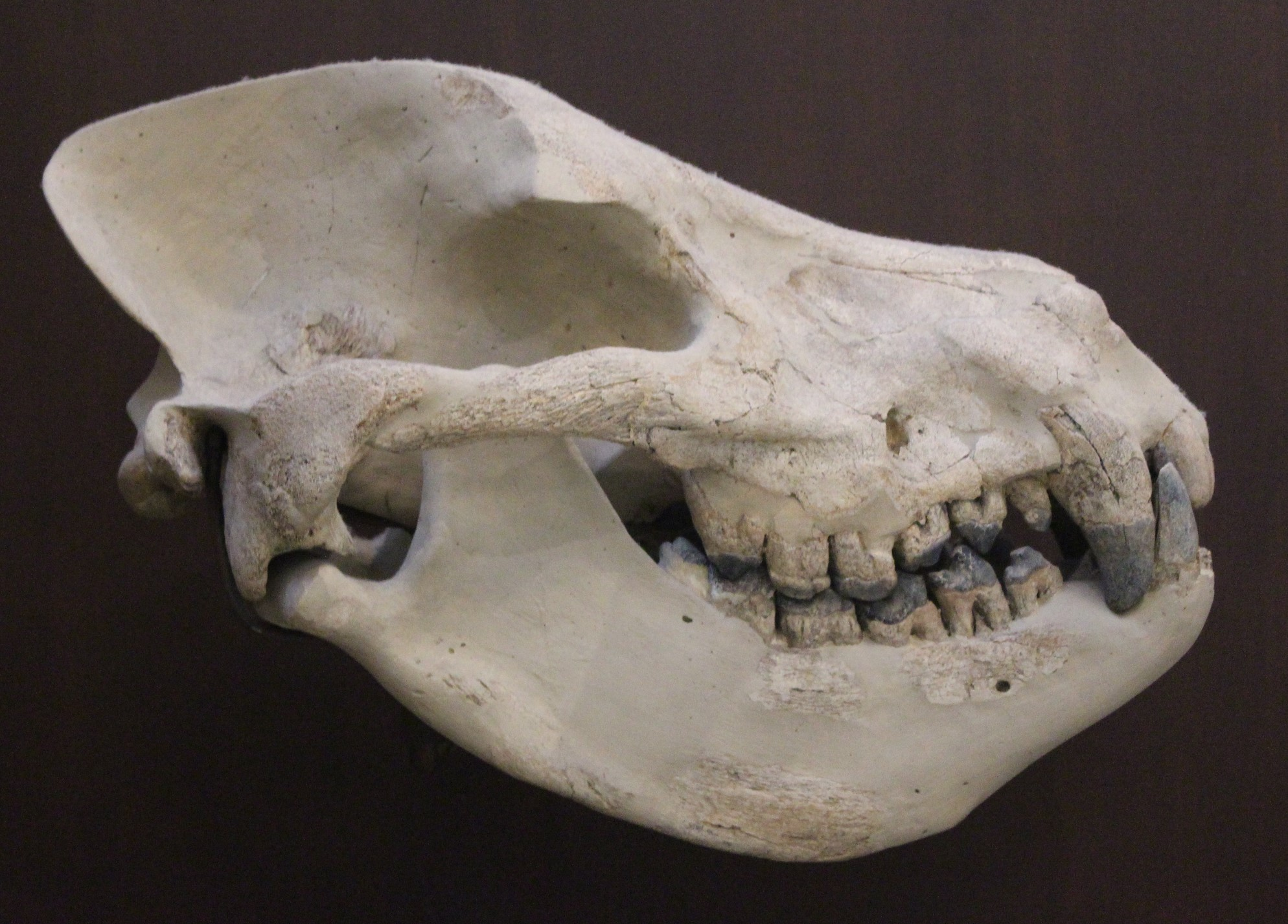
- Skull of H. immanis

Scientific classification
- Kingdom: Animalia
- Phylum: Chordata
- Class: Mammalia
- Order: †Mesonychia
- Family: †Mesonychidae
- Genus: †Harpagolestes; Wortman, 1901

Type species
- Harpagolestes macrocephalus Wortman, 1901

Other species
- H. alxaensis; H. brevipes; H. immanis; "H." koreanicus; H. leotensis; H. leei; H. orientalis?; H. uintensis

= Harpagolestes =

Harpagolestes Temporal range: Middle Eocene–Late Eocene

Extinct genus of mesonychid

Harpagolestes ("hooked thief") is an extinct genus of hyena like, bear sized mesonychid mesonychian that lived in Central and Eastern Asia as well western and central North America during the middle to late Eocene. It was one of the largest mesonychians known, with large species having a skull length of at least 40 cm (16 in). Unlike the closely related Mesonyx, Harpagolestes was believed to have been a scavenger as it lacked the dentition to effectively slice through flesh and tendon as well as stout limbs. Harpagolestes was the last North American mesonychid, with the last species going extinct after the early Duchesnean of NALMA.

== Taxonomy ==
Szalay and Gould (1966) classified Harpagolestes as a mesonychine mesonychid within the paper they described H. orientalis. In their 2007 paper, Geisler et al. recovered Harpagolestes in a clade with Mesonyx and Synoplotherium.

Spaulding et al. (2009) recovered Harpagolestes as a paraphyletic genus, with H. orientalis being more closely related to Pachyaena than to H. uintensis.

- - - †Hapalodectes
    - - †Sinonyx
      - †Mesonyx
      - †Harpagolestes uintensis
      - †Dissacus zanabazari
      - - †Dissacus praenuntius
        - - †Harpagolestes orientalis
          - †Pachyaena
  - - †Protungulatum
    - - Perissodactyla
      - Artiodactyla
        - Tylopoda
        - - Suina
          - - Ruminantia
            - - †Entelodontidae
              - - - †Anthracotheriidae
                  - Hippopotamidae
                - - †Raoellidae
                  - Cetacea

Solé et al. (2018) recovered Harpagolestes as part of the Mesonyx clade, a clade of derived mesonychids that were mostly known from the Eocene. Their phylogenetic analysis recovered it as a sister taxon of Mesonyx. Solé et al. (2023) also recovered Harpagolestes as a member of the Mesonyx clade, although within this study it is recovered as a sister taxon to the group containing Mongolonyx and Mongolestes.

The geographic origin of Harpagolestes is unclear as they were coeval in both North America and Asia. Within North America, it first appeared during the Bridgerian faunal stage via H. macrocephalus. However, the genus was more abundant during the Uintan faunal stage. In Asia, Harpagolestes first appeared during the Irdinmanhan faunal stage.

== Description ==
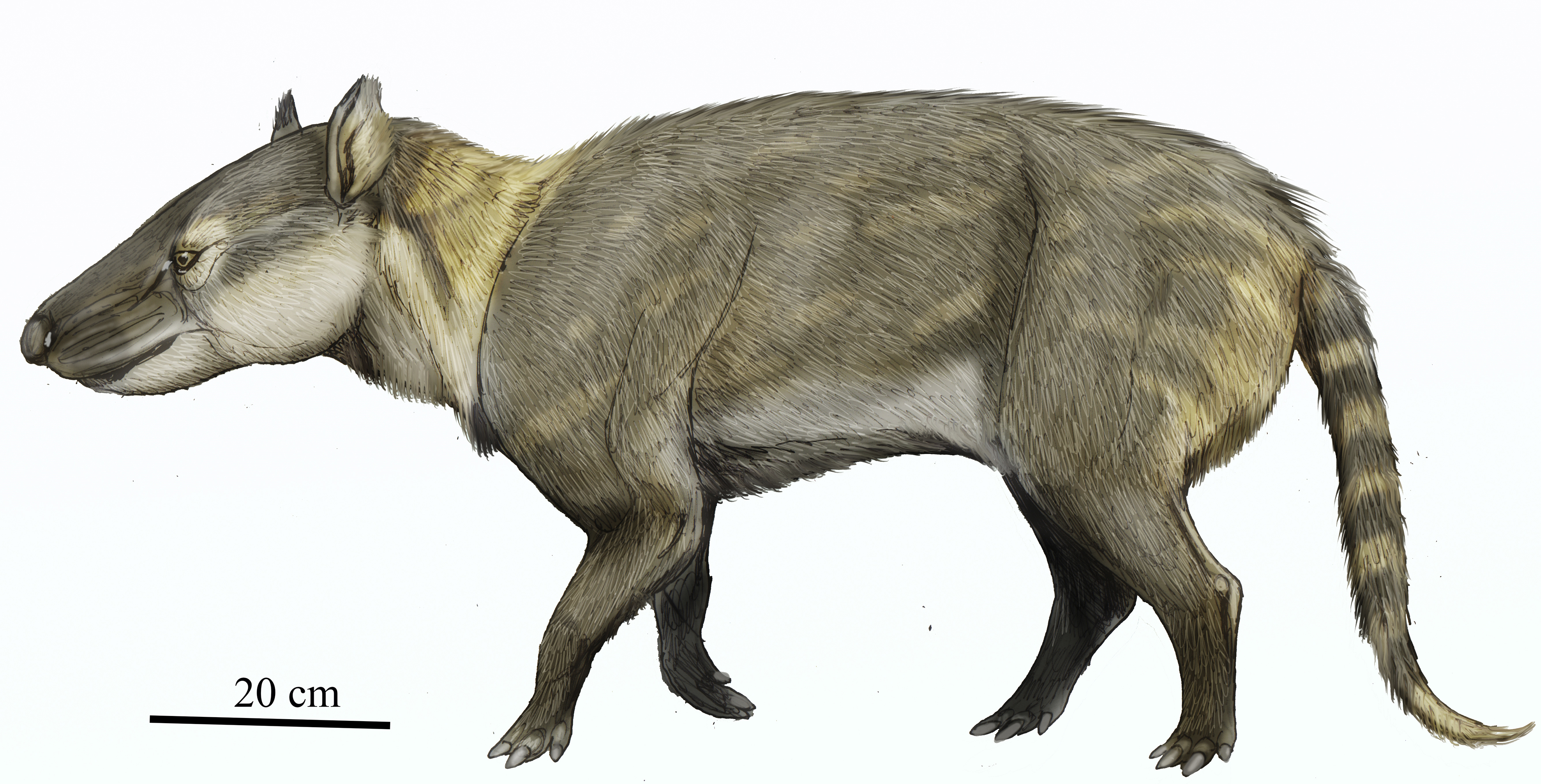
Life reconstruction of H. orientalis

Harpagolestes was a large animal, with a skull length of a half a meter in some species. H. orientalis was one of the smaller species, with a skull length of 32 cm (13 in). Compared to Mesonyx, the skull of H. orientalis was significantly more robust, as well as consisting of relatively larger teeth. H. uintensis from the Middle Eocene of Wyoming is described as having a total cranium length of 42.9 cm (16.9 in) and a facial length of 20.6 cm (8.1 in). H. immanis was slightly larger than H. uintensis, with a skull length of 46 cm (18 in). The largest species within the genus was H. brevipes. The poorly known North Korean "H." koreanicus was named based on three isolated teeth, but other researchers found the teeth insufficient for a diagnosis and the holotype of this species is currently lost.

== Paleobiology ==
Szalay and Gould (1966) recovered Harpagolestes as a bone-crushing, carrion feeder as it showed extensive wear on the dentition. The blunt nature of their teeth suggests they were poorly suited for slicing through flesh or tendons. They concluded the blunt nature of their teeth suggests they were well adapted for feeding on abundant carrion of large herbivores of North America and Asia. Kramarenko (1974) noted that the limb bones Harpagolestes were stout, suggesting Harpagolestes did not pursue its prey and was scavenger. West (1981) suggested Harpagolestes, as well as other large mesonychids, had an omnivorous diet.
