= Chakpaktas Formation =

Geological formation in Kazakhstan

- Stratigraphic range: Middle Eocene, Arshantan
- Type: Formation
- Unit of: Zaysan Depression
- Underlies: Obaila Formation
- Thickness: 29 metres (95 ft)

Lithology
- Primary: mudstone, sandstone

Location
- Country: Kazakhstan

Chakpaktas Formation (also known as the Chakpaktas svita) is a geological formation in eastern Kazakhstan, as well as being the lowest fossil-bearing strata of the Zaysan Depression. The formation is aged to the Arshantan Asian Land Animal Age which correlates to between the upper Ypresian and lower Lutetian.

== Geology ==
The Chakpaktas formation is made up of 29 meters of deposits with the sediment transitioning from mudstone to sandstone around midway through. It contains interbedding of quartz and pebbles at the lower parts of the deposit. The mammal localities of the formation can only be found in the southeastern part of the basin which falls in between the Kalmakpay Mountain and Kendyrlyk River.

== Paleobiota ==
=== Artiodactyla ===
Genus	Species	Notes	Image
Aksyiria	A. oligostus	A poorly known dichobunid known from a single molar.	
Paraphenacodus	P. solivagus	A large dichobunid known from a single lower molar that shows a bunodont morphology.	

=== Crocodilia ===
Genus	Species	Notes	Image
Pristichampsus	P. kuznetsov	A more terrestrial crocodilian, the genus is of questionable validity as some species have been moved to other genera. It is not completely known where the material attributed to the species is found, though it is most likely to have come from the Chakpaktas Formation.	

=== Dinocerata ===
Genus	Species	Notes	Image
Gobiatherium	G. mirificum	A long-skulled uintathere with an inflated nasal region and flared zygomatic arches similar in shape to what's seen in entelodonts.	

=== Perissodactyla ===
Genus	Species	Notes	Image
Eoletes	E. tshakpaktasensis	A hyrachyid known from a fairly complete skull, larger than other species within the genus like E. tianshanicus. It was originally described as the genus Subhyrachyus.	
Isectolophus	I. latidens	An isectolophid perissodactyl that helped to confirm the correlation between the Arshantan and Bridgerian land animal ages. The animal lacked the postcanine diastema seen in most ungulates.	
Rhodopagus	"R". radinskyi	A rhodopagid that has been noted to be within its own genus rather than being assigned to the genus Rhodopagus.	

=== Rodentia ===
Genus	Species	Notes	Image
Juniperimus	J. flerovi		

=== Testudine ===
Genus	Species	Notes	Image
Altaytrionyx	A. devjatkini	A trionychid turtle.	
Geiselemys	G. sp.	A geoemydid turtle that was originally described under the genus grayemys.	
Paraplastomenus	P. cf. mlynarskii	A medium-sized trionychid with a large amount of medial contact of the hyopastra and hypoplastra.	
