= Shimenotherium =

Shimenotherium Temporal range: Danian

Scientific classification
- Kingdom: Animalia
- Phylum: Chordata
- Class: Mammalia
- Order: Mesonychia
- Family: incertae sedis
- Genus: Shimenotherium Xue et al., 2026
- Species: S. jubilatum

Binomial name
- Shimenotherium jubilatum Xue et al., 2026

Extinct genus of mammals

Shimenotherium is a genus of medium-sized, basal mesonychian with short jaws that first appeared during the Early Paleocene in the Danian stage. It is known from two articulated, mostly complete skeletons found in the Fangou Formation within the Shimen Basin in Shaanxi Province, China. Only one species is known, Shimenotherium jubilatum.

== Anatomy ==
The skull is similar to those of Hukoutherium, but has a shorter face and a longer sagittal crest. The dental anatomy is very similar to those of H. ambiguum and of Yantanglestes. Compared to those mesonychians who have known post-cranial elements including foot anatomy, Shimenotherium has a plantigrade stance.

== Taxonomy ==
In comparisons with other mesonychians, Xue et al. determined Shimenotherium to be a basal mesonychian most closely related to Yantanglestes and Hukoutherium ambiguum.
