= Jiangxia =

Jiangxia may refer to:

- Jiangxia Commandery, administrative division in ancient China, centred around present-day Yunmeng County or Wuhan's Xinzhou District in Hubei Province
- Jiangxia District, district in Wuhan, Hubei, China
- Jiangxia (mammal), Chinese mesonychid from the Nongshanian division of the Upper Paleocene
- Chianghsia, an extinct genus of monstersaurian platynotan lizard.
