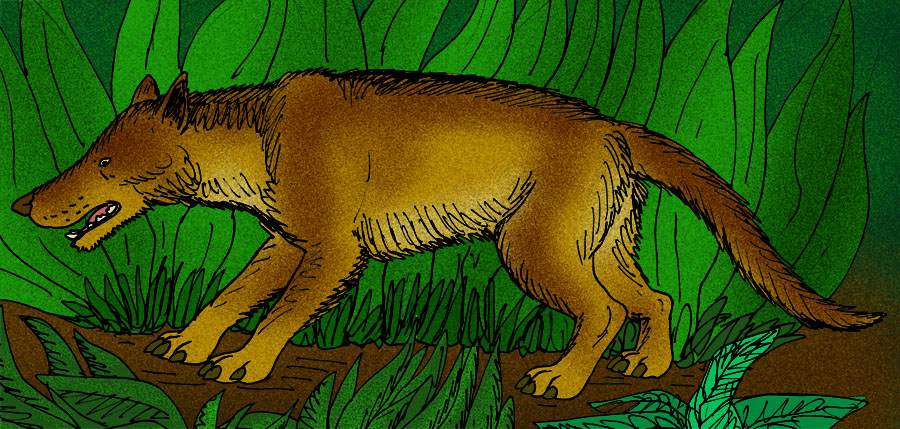
- Jiangxia chaotoensis

Scientific classification
- Kingdom: Animalia
- Phylum: Chordata
- Class: Mammalia
- Infraclass: Placentalia
- Order: †Mesonychia
- Family: †Mesonychidae
- Genus: †Jiangxia; Zhang et al., 1979
- Species: †J. chaotoensis

Binomial name
- †Jiangxia chaotoensis Zhang et al., 1979

= Jiangxia chaotoensis =

Jiangxia chaotoensis Temporal range: Early Paleocene–Late Paleocene

Species of mammal

Jiangxia chaotoensis is a Chinese mesonychid from the Nongshanian division of the Upper Paleocene. It may be related to the genera Dissacus and Hukoutherium.

Jiangxia chaotoensis was named after the province of Jiangxi, China, where it was found.
