= Houldjinian =

The Houldjinian age is a period of geologic time within the Late Eocene epoch of the Paleogene used more specifically with Asian Land Mammal Ages. It follows the Ergilian and precedes the Kekeamuan age.

The Houldjinian's lower boundary is the approximate base of the Priabonian age. The Houldjinian age is named after the Houldjin gravel beds in Inner Mongolia.
