= Kekeamuan =

Asian Land Mammal Age

The Kekeamuan is an Asian Land Mammal Age within the a middle Oligocene interval succeeding the Houldjinian (early Oligocene).

The Houldjinian–Kekeamuan transition is a conspicuous faunal turnover of the Oligocene in Asia, marked by the extinction of several archaic mammal groups and the appearance and diversification of more derived rodents.

The Kekeamuan's upper boundary is the approximate base of the Chattian age.
