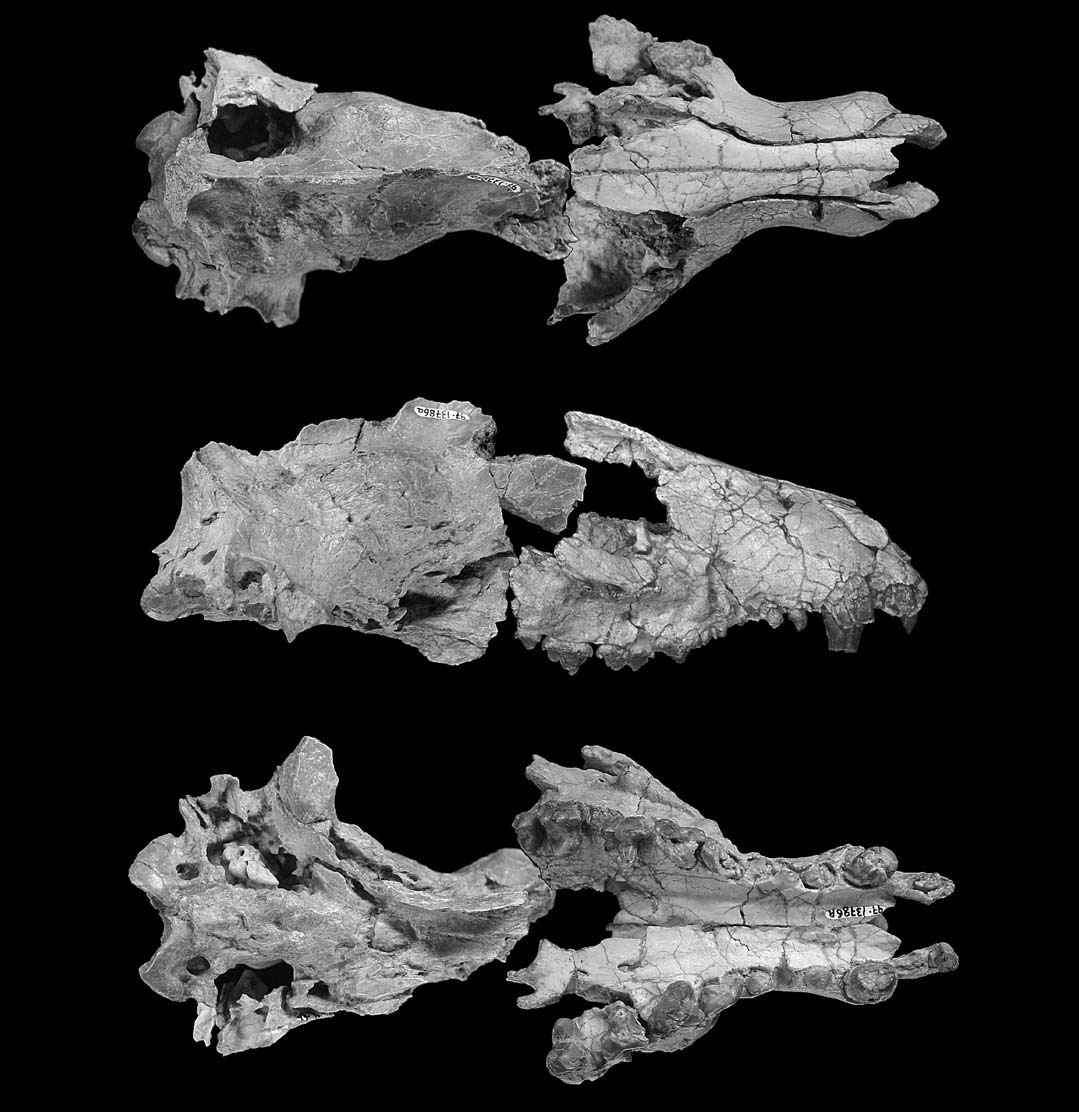
- Skull of Dissacus zanabazari

Scientific classification
- Kingdom: Animalia
- Phylum: Chordata
- Class: Mammalia
- Order: †Mesonychia
- Family: †Mesonychidae
- Genus: †Dissacus; Cope, 1881

Type species
- †Dissacus navajovius

Other Species
- †D. argenteus O'Leary and Rose, 1995; †D. bohaiensis? Tong and Wang, 2006; †D. europaeus Lemoine, 1891; †D. indigenus Dashzeveg, 1976; †D. magushanensis Yan and Tang, 1976; †D. praenuntius Matthew and Granger, 1915; †D. rotundus? Wang, 1975; †D. saurognathus? Wortman, 1897; †D. serior? O'Leary and Rose, 1995; †D. serratus? Chow and Qi, 1978; †D. shanghoensis Chow et al., 1973; †D. zanabazari? Geisler and McKenna, 2007; †D. zengi? Ting, 2004

= Dissacus =

Dissacus Temporal range: Early Paleocene-Early Eocene (Danian to Ypresian), 63–52.4 Ma

Genus of extinct mammals

Dissacus is a paraphyletic extinct genus of faunivore jackal to coyote-sized mammal in the family Mesonychidae, a family of hoofed mammals part of the extinct order Mesonychia. Their fossils in Early Paleocene to Middle Eocene aged strata in Eurasia and North America. Dissacus europaeus likely evolved from a population of North America Dissacus that migrated to Europe, and first appeared in European strata in the Thanetian (c. 58-57 MYA). A phylogenetic analysis of European mesonychids suggests that Dissacus was part of an early diversification of species in the Paleocene, and other genera diversified in a later episode in the early Eocene. D. europaeus survived the Paleocene-Eocene Thermal Maximum, a period of severe global warming, which suggests it had flexible habits. Orientation patch analysis of the molar teeth of the North American D. praenuntius suggests its faunivore with consisted diet consisting of meat, although it wasn’t a hypercarnivore such a felid or weasel, instead having a diet similar to brown hyenas where insects and plant matter made up a small proportion of its diet. It shared its environment with other omnivorous mammals of a similar body size such as Palaeonictis, although Dissacus had a greater preference of meat.

Originally, it was believed Dissacus was present in both Northwestern and Southwestern Europe from the latest Paleocene to Early Eocene, however all European species, with the exception of D. europaeus, were reclassified as Hyaenodictis. This reclassification restricted European Dissacus to Northwestern Europe during the latest Paleocene to earliest Eocene. D. europaeus would be passively replaced by Pachyaena and Palaeonictis, after the two dispersed into Northwestern Europe. It is considered unlikely for Pachyaena to be an ecological replacement for Dissacus as the former was considerable larger.

== Taxonomy ==
Phylogenetic modeling recovered Dissacus as a paraphyletic genus. Spaulding et al. (2009) recovered D. praenuntius being more closely related to Pachyaena and Harpagolestes orientalis.

- - - †Hapalodectes
    - - †Sinonyx
      - †Mesonyx
      - †Harpagolestes uintensis
      - †Dissacus zanabazari
      - - †Dissacus praenuntius
        - - †Harpagolestes orientalis
          - †Pachyaena
  - - †Protungulatum
    - - Perissodactyla
      - Artiodactyla
        - Tylopoda
        - - Suina
          - - Ruminantia
            - - †Entelodontidae
              - - - †Anthracotheriidae
                  - Hippopotamidae
                - - †Raoellidae
                  - Cetacea

Solé et al. (2018) recovered D. praenuntius, D. europaeus, and D. argenteus as the most basal mesonychids. D. serratus and D. zanabazari were recovered as members of the Asian Dissacus clade, with D. willwoodensis being recovered as close relative to the clade. The European Dissacus clade consisted of D. rougierae, D. raslanloubatieri, D. blayaci, and D. filholi. D. navajovius was recovered as a sister taxon to the monospecific Ankalagon, questioning the validity of the latter genus. The same analysis recovered D. serior within the Mesonyx clade.

Solé et al. (2023) revived the genus Hyaenodictis finding it distinct from Dissacus, with D. filholi being its type species. In addition, they reclassified D. blayaci, D. progressus, D. rougierae and D. raslanloubatieri as European species and D. willwoodensis as the North American species of Hyaenodictis.

Their phylogenetic analysis included D. rotundus, D. zengi, and D. magushanensis. D. rotundus was found to be closely related to D. navajovius and Ankalagon. The close relation between Ankalagon and D. navajovius suggests the former may be a species of Dissacus. D. zengi was recovered as a sister taxon to the Asian Dissacus clade and D. magushanensis was recovered as sister taxon to D. argenteus. Current Dissacus species also saw some revised positioning, with D. bohaiensis was moved to the Asian Dissacus clade.

== Description ==
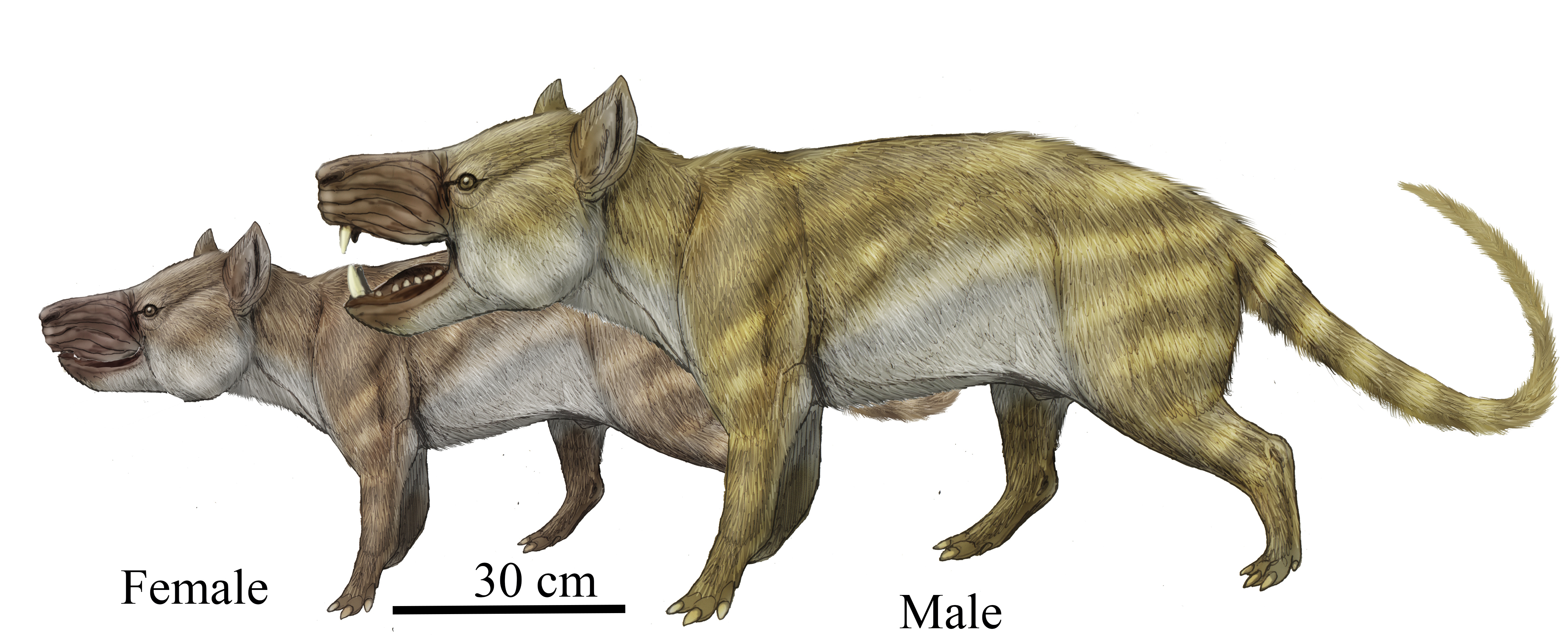
Size comparison between male and female D. saurognathus

D. navajovius was the smallest North American species, length and width regressions of m2 suggests the species weighed 9.92 kg (21 lb 14 oz) on average, with the largest specimen, AMNH 3361 weighing 11.33 kg (25 lb 0 oz). D. praenuntius was the largest definitive North American species, with m2 regressions estimating Clarkforkian D. praenuntius weighed 18 kg (39 lb 11 oz) on average. During the PETM, D. praenuntius saw a decrease in size averaging at around 14.28 kg (31 lb 8 oz). Possible Dissacus species, D. saurognathus, was thought to have grown even larger with a head length of 30 cm (12 in) and an estimated body mass of 46.9–92.4 kg (103 lb 6 oz – 203 lb 11 oz). ^{Including supplementary materials}

D. europaeus was the smallest European mesonychid weighing 8–14 kg (17 lb 10 oz – 30 lb 14 oz) prior to the thermal maximum. During the thermal maximum, D. europaeus shrunk in size significantly, with dwarf-sized specimens weighing 4–5 kg (8 lb 13 oz – 11 lb 0 oz).

== Paleobiology ==
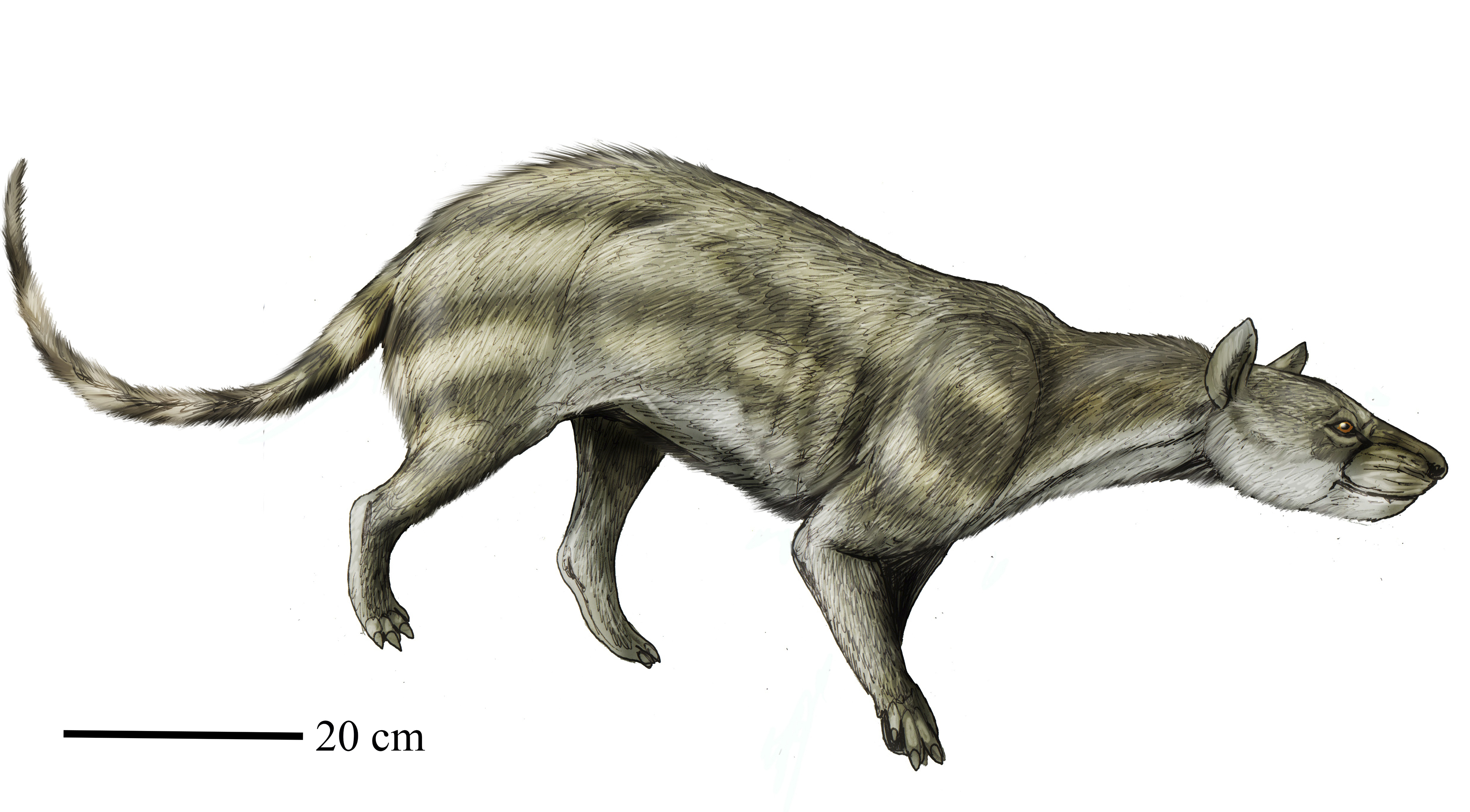
Life reconstruction of D. zanabazari

=== Locomotion ===
A morphological study of limb bones of D. europaeus suggests this animal was digitigrade and more cursorial than is usually assumed for the genus. Analysis of the elbow joint shows it was specialized for extra flexion and extension, an adaptation usually found in running species; the amount of specialization is unusual for a Paleocene mammal. This does not mean Dissacus species were swift runners by modern standards, but that D. europaeus was more adapted for running than other mammals of its time. It may be part of a trend among early Cenozoic mammals toward developing more specialized bodies to fill different ecological niches.

=== Diet ===
Dental microwear analysis found before the Palaeocene-Eocene Thermal Maximum (PETM), dental microwear of D. praenuntius was similar to cheetahs and brown hyenas, suggesting it was a cheetah-like generalist faunivore that consumed relatively few bones. During and after the Paleocene-Eocene thermal maximum, dental microwear patterns resembled more of lions and bone-crunching hyenas, suggesting had an increase in bone consumption such as pelvis and limbs. Alternatively, insects and hard fruits may have also been a regular part of the diet of PETM and post-PETM specimens. While distinguishing whether hard/tough plants or animal tissues were responsible for dental microwear is difficult, texture fill volume was most similar to brown hyenas. Brown hyenas have been noted to mainly scavenge but occasionally consume insects, fruits, and vegetation, suggesting insects and plant matter most likely made a small proportion of their diet.

== Extinction ==
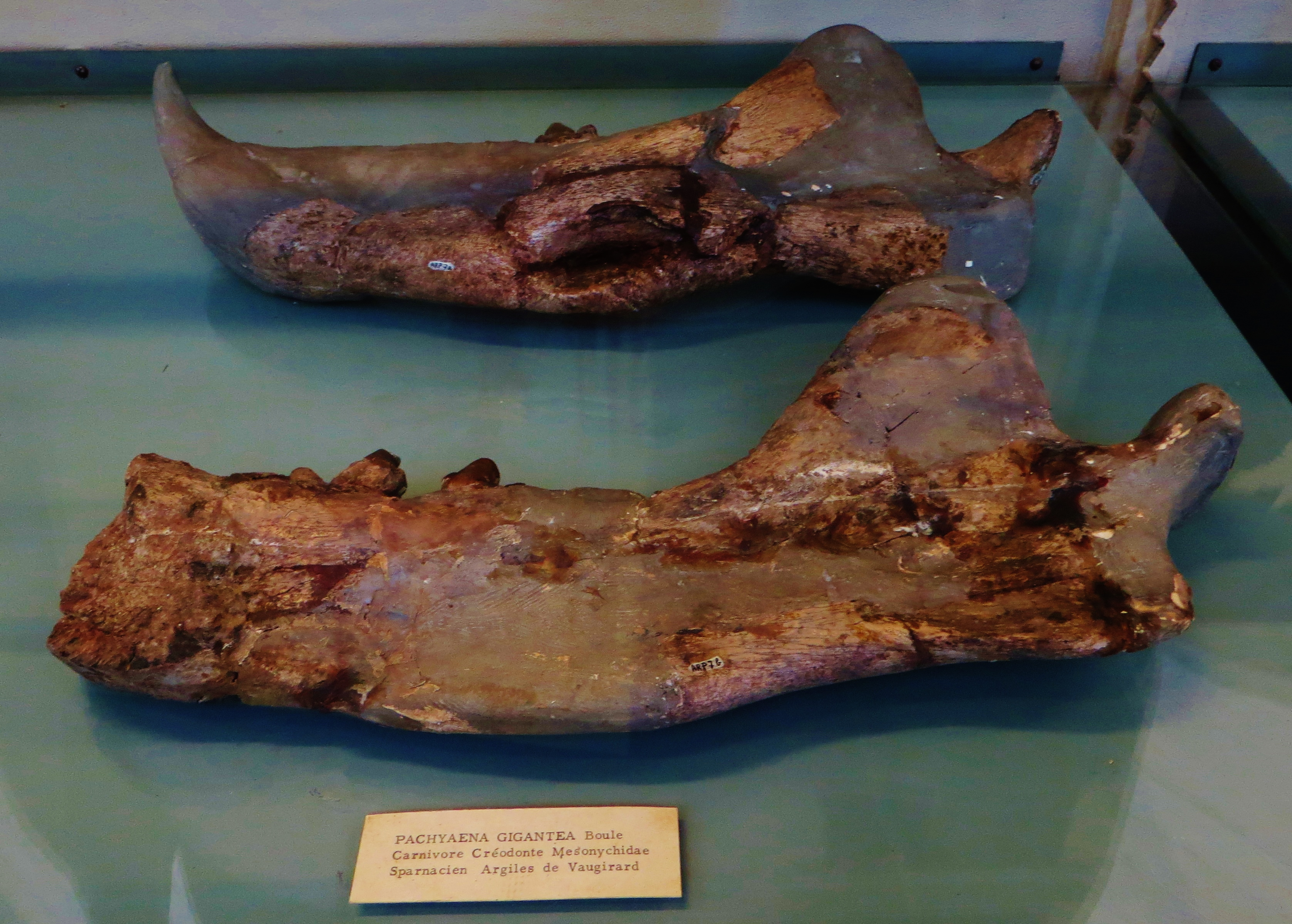
Mandible of Pachyaena gigantea, a mesonychid that replaced Dissacus in Northwestern Europe

D. europaeus would go extinct roughly 55.5 million years ago contemporary with the appearance of Pachyaena and Palaeonictis in Northwestern Europe. However, it was unlikely Pachyaena ecologically replaced Dissacus, due to the former's much larger body size. Palaeonictis occupied a different niche than Dissacus, with the latter having a greater preference for meat. D. praenuntius, would go extinct in or shortly after Wa-2, which dates to 54.7-54.4 million years ago. Its extinction coincided with the diversification of Pachyaena and Hyaenodictis willwoodensis. Schwartz et al. (2025) suggested the possible chance of competitive replacement, however dental microwear on the two mesonychids is required. The last North America species, represented by D. serior was found within Wa-6, which dates to 53.0-52.4 million years ago.
