= Bumbanian =

The Bumbanian is an Asian Land Mammal Age (ALMA), a large biozone which corresponds to ages between 56.0–52.1 Ma. for finds of fossil mammals in Asia. This zone lies within the Ypresian stage of the Eocene series. It follows the Gashatan ALMA and precedes the Arshantan ALMA.
