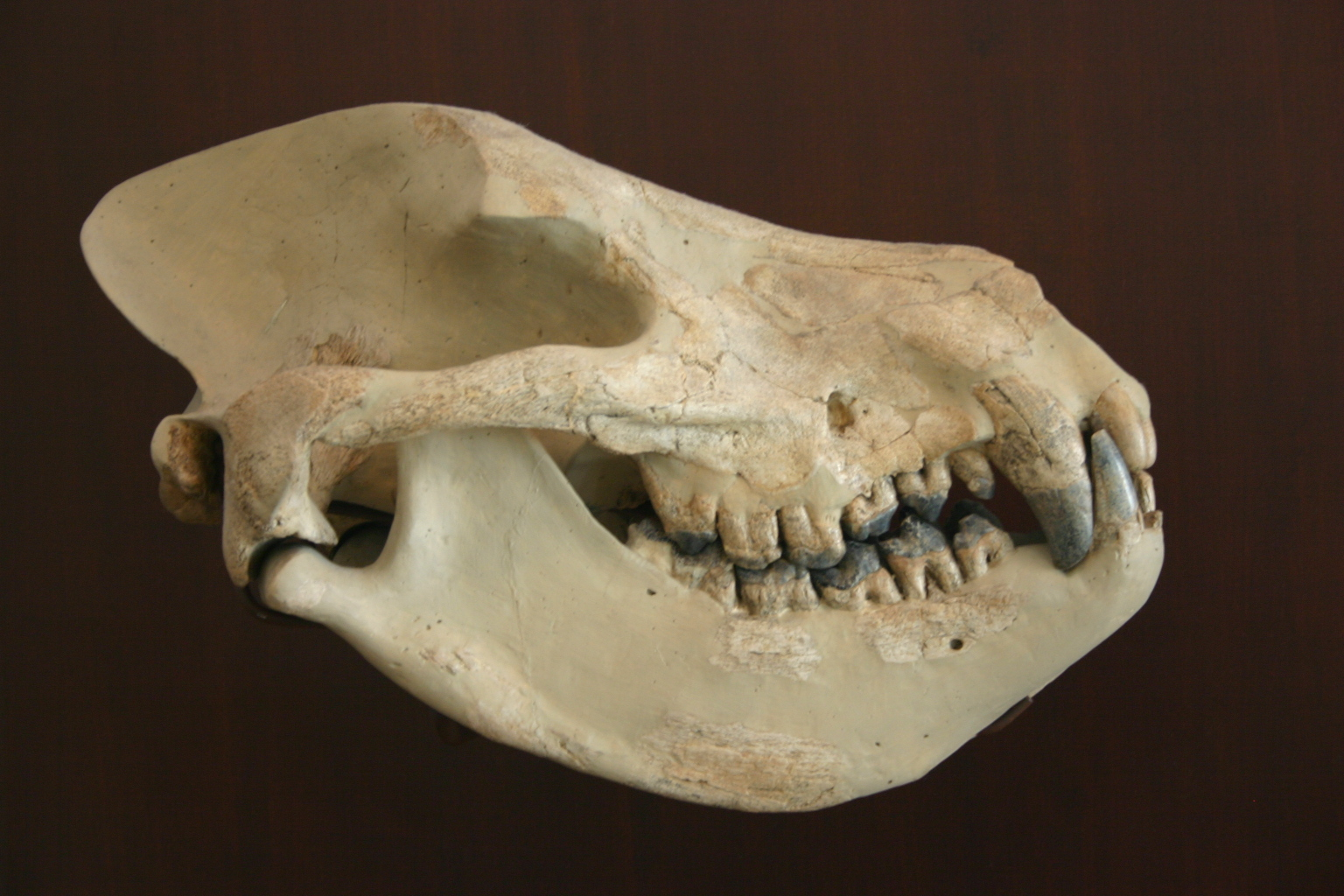
- Harpagolestes immanis skull
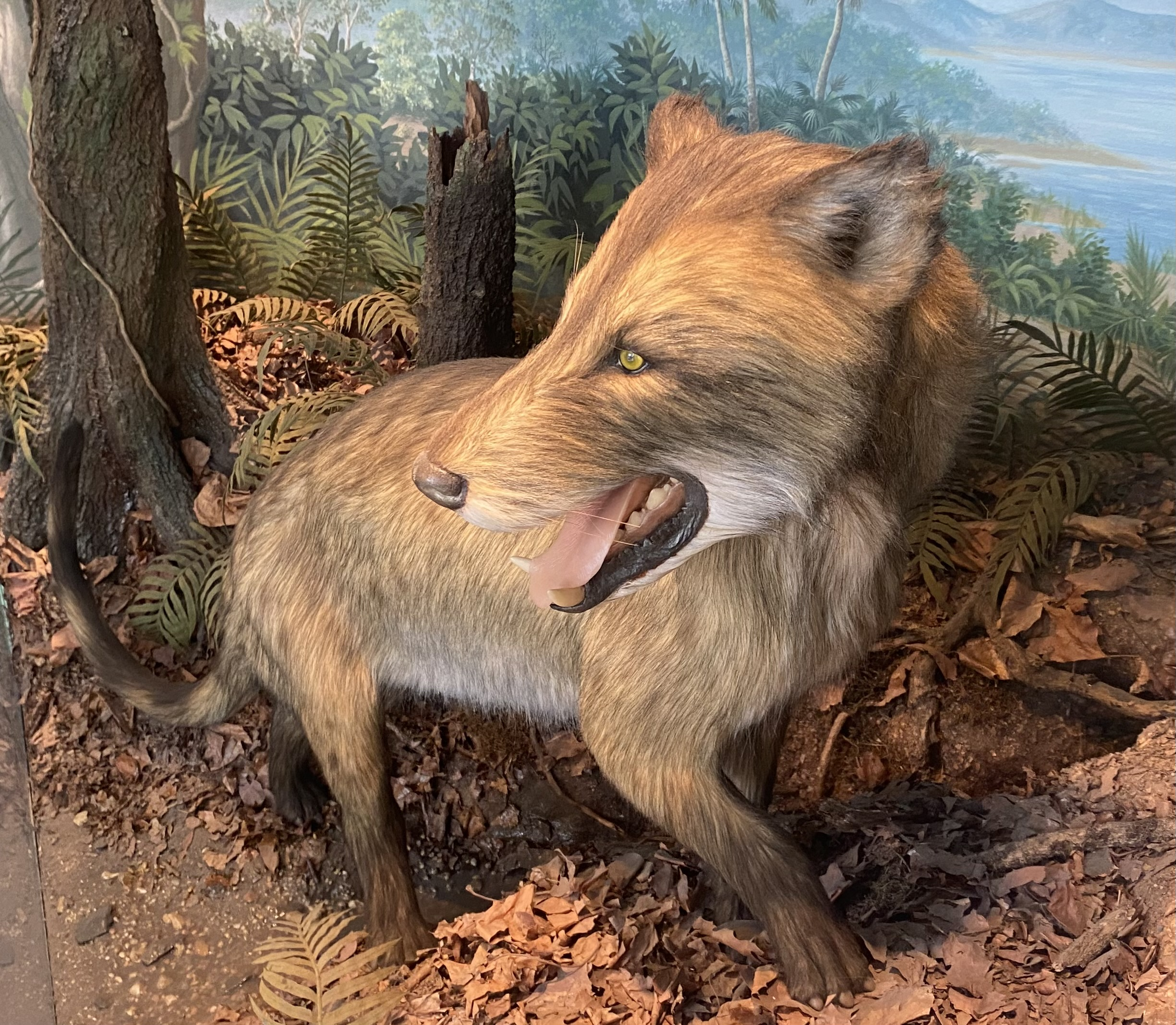
- Model reconstruction of Mesonyx

Scientific classification
- Kingdom: Animalia
- Phylum: Chordata
- Class: Mammalia
- Order: †Mesonychia
- Family: †Mesonychidae; Cope 1875

Type genus
- †Mesonyx Cope, 1872

Genera
- List: †Ankalagon? Van Valen, 1980; †Dissacus Cope, 1891; †Guilestes Zheng & Chi, 1978; †Harpagolestes Wortman, 1901; †Hessolestes Peterson, 1931; †Honanodon Chow, 1965; †Hukoutherium Chow et al. 1973; †Hyaenodictis Lemoine, 1880; †Jiangxia Zhang et al., 1979; †Lohoodon Chow et al. 1978; †Mesonyx Cope, 1872; †Metahapalodectes Dashzeveg, 1976; †Mongolestes Szalay & Gould, 1966; †Mongolonyx Szalay & Gould, 1966; †Pachyaena Cope, 1874; †Shimenotherium Xiangxu, 2026; †Sinonyx Zhou et al. 1995; †Synoplotherium Cope, 1872; †Yantanglestes Ideker and Yan, 1980

= Mesonychidae =

Mesonychidae Temporal range: Early Paleocene — Late Eocene, 63–34 Ma Suspected Late Cretaceous origin

Extinct family of mammals

Mesonychidae (meaning "middle claws") is an extinct family of small to large omnivorous-carnivorous mammals, one of the two families in the order Mesonychia. They were found in North America and Eurasia during the Early Paleocene to the Late Eocene. Once considered a sister-taxon to artiodactyls, recent evidence now suggests no close relation to any living mammal. Mesonychid taxonomy has long been disputed and they have captured popular imagination as "wolves on hooves", animals that combine features of both ungulates and carnivorans.

== Taxonomy ==
=== Classification ===
Mesonychidae was named by Edward Drinker Cope (1875), with its type genus, Mesonyx, being assigned to Carnivora. However, in an 1880 paper, he moved mesonychids to a newly established fossil order, Creodonta, a polyphyletic group of carnivorous mammals. Van Valen (1966) recovered mesonychids as members of the order Condylarthra, a polyphyletic grouping of hoofed mammals. In a following paper, Van Valen reclassified mesonychids as their own order, Mesonychia. This classification has been supported by all recent studies.

=== Relationship with Cetacea ===
Because skulls and teeth of mesonychids have similar features to early whales, the family was long thought to be the ancestors of cetaceans. However, fossil discoveries of early terrestrial whales with legs have overturned this idea; the consensus is that whales are highly derived artiodactyls. Some researchers now consider mesonychids to be a sister group either to whales or to artiodactyls, meaning that they are close relatives rather than direct ancestors. Other studies define Mesonychia as basal to all ungulates, no closer to whales than to any other fossil or living ungulate, and place them in a position between Perissodactyla and Ferae. In this case, the resemblances to early whales would be due to convergent evolution among ungulate-like herbivores that developed adaptations related to hunting or eating meat.

== Description ==
The mesonychids were an unusual group of mammals with a specialized dentition featuring tri-cuspid upper molars and high-crowned lower molars with shearing surfaces. These shearing surfaces were capable of cutting, but not as efficiently as the carnassals of hyaenodonts or carnivorans. Like the Paleocene family Arctocyonidae, mesonychids were once viewed as primitive carnivorans. Various genera and species coexisted in some localities, such as the Lushi Formation. In contrast to arctocyonids, the mesonychids had only four digits furnished with hooves supported by narrow fissured end phalanges. Mesonychids varied in diet from carnivorous or omnivorous to bone-crushing carrion specialists.

== Evolutionary history ==
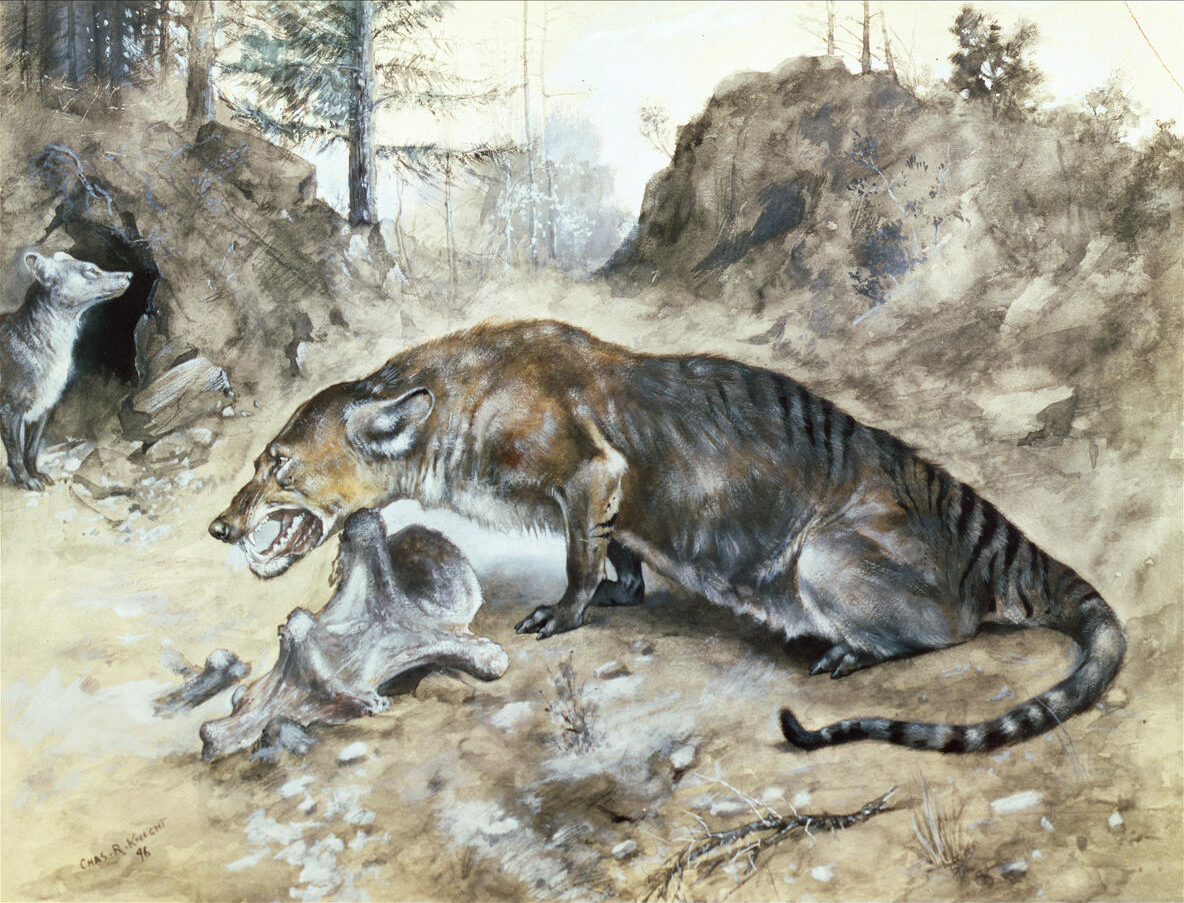
Restoration of Mesonyx

Mesonychids probably originated in Asia, where the oldest mesonychids, Yantanglestes, Dissacus rotundus, Hukoutherium, and Dissaccussium , are known from the Early Paleocene. Throughout the Paleocene and Eocene, several genera, including Dissacus, Pachyaena, and Mesonyx would radiate out from their ancestral home in Asia and disperse into North America via the Bering land bridge. From North America, mesonychids would disperse into Europe. Mesonychids fared very poorly at the close of the Eocene epoch. Originally, it was thought that only one genus, Mongolestes, survived into the Early Oligocene epoch, going extinct 33 million years ago. However, recent analysis found the supposed Early Oligocene biochronogical units have been revised to the Late Eocene age, suggesting the family went extinct just before the end of the Eocene.
