= Asian land mammal age =

Geologic timescale for prehistoric Asian fauna

The Asian land mammal ages, acronym ALMA, establish a geologic timescale for prehistoric Asian fauna, from the Paleocene to the Pleistocene. These biozones may be referred to as ages, stages, or intervals, and were established using geographic place names where their respective fossils were obtained. Many of the ALMAs are based on corresponding faunas found in the Erlian Basin in Inner Mongolia, China.

The basic unit of measure is the first/last boundary statement. This shows that the first appearance event of one taxon is known to predate the last appearance event of another. If two taxa are found in the same fossil quarry or at the same stratigraphic horizon, then their age-range zones overlap.

== Ages ==
Direct radiometric dating of all ALMAs has not proven possible. Few absolute dates have been proposed, and those that have been are approximate and based on correlations to the geomagnetic polarity time scale or mammal faunas in other parts of the world.

Age	Lower boundary	Upper boundary	Correlation	Correlation (NALMA)
Nihewanian			Pleistocene	
Youhean			Late Pliocene	Late Blancan
Jinglean			Early Pliocene	Late Hemphillian–early Blancan
Baodean			Late Miocene	Late Clarendonian–early Hemphillian
Bahean	~11.1 Ma		Middle–late Miocene	Clarendonian
Tunggurian		~11.1 Ma	Early–middle Miocene	Barstovian
Shanwangian	~19.5 Ma		Early Miocene	Late Hemingfordian
Xiejian	~23.03 Ma	~19.5 Ma	Early Miocene	
Tabenbulakian	~31 Ma/30.6 Ma	~23.03 Ma	Late Oligocene	late Whitneyan–early Hemingfordian
Hsandagolian	~33.9 Ma/33.3 Ma	~31 Ma/30.6 Ma	Early–middle Oligocene (early Rupelian)	Orellan–middle Whitneyan
Kekeamuan			Early–middle Oligocene	Late Orellan–early Whitneyan
Houldjinian			Early Oligocene	Early Orellan
Ergilian	~37.8 Ma	~33.9 Ma	Late Eocene (Priabonian)	Chadronian
Ulangochuian	~39.9 Ma	~37.8 Ma	Late Eocene (late Bartonian)	Duchesnean
Sharamurunian	~42.7 Ma	~39.9 Ma	Middle–late Eocene (Late Lutetian–early Bartonian)	Late Uintan (Ui3)
Irdinmanhan	~47.8 Ma	~42.7 Ma	Middle Eocene (Early–Middle Lutetian)	Early–middle Uintan (Ui1–Ui2)
Arshantan	~52.1 Ma	~47.8 Ma	Early Eocene (late Ypresian)	Bridgerian
Bumbanian	~56.0 Ma	~52.1 Ma	Early Eocene (early Ypresian)	Wasatchian
Gashatan	~59.2 Ma	~56.0 Ma	Late Paleocene (Thanetian)	Late Tiffanian–Clarkforkian
Nongshanian	~62.2 Ma	~59.2 Ma	Middle Paleocene	Tiffanian
Shanghuan	~66.0 Ma	~62.2 Ma	Early Paleocene (Danian)	Puercan–Torrejonian

== Other continental ages ==
- European land mammal age
- North American land mammal age
- South American land mammal age
- African land mammal age

== See also ==
- Biochronology
