= Shanghuan =

Biozone of Asian mammal fossils

The Shanghuan is an Asian land mammal age (ALMA), a biozone of Asian mammal fossils, equivalent to the early part of the Paleocene epoch (around 66.0 to 62.2 million years ago, within the Danian stage). It precedes the Nongshanian ALMA. The Shanghuan is named after the Shanghu Formation in Guangdong.

The base of the Shanghuan is linked to the Cretaceous-Paleogene boundary, marking the beginning of the Cenozoic (and thus the Paleogene, Paleocene, and Danian). The top of the Shanghuan is at the boundary between polarity chrons C27n and C26r. The Shanghuan is likely equivalent to the Puercan and Torrejonian North American land mammal ages (NALMAs).

The Shanghuan marks the earliest fossil record of many mammal groups common to the Paleocene and early Eocene of Asia. These include early relatives of rabbits and rodents: anagalids, astigalids, pseudictopids, eurymylids, and mimotonids. Other new groups are stocky omnivores or herbivores with no clear modern relatives, such as tillodonts and pantodonts. Carnivorous mammals of this stage include early mesonychians and carnivoramorphs.

== Formations ==
Shanghuan geological formations are exclusively found in China. They include:

- Shanghu Formation (Guangdong)
- Wanghudun Formation (Anhui)
- Zaoshi Formation (Hunan)
- Fangou Formation (Shaanxi)
- Juanling Formation (Shaanxi)
- Shizikou Formation (Jiangxi)
- Gaoyugou Formation (Henan)
