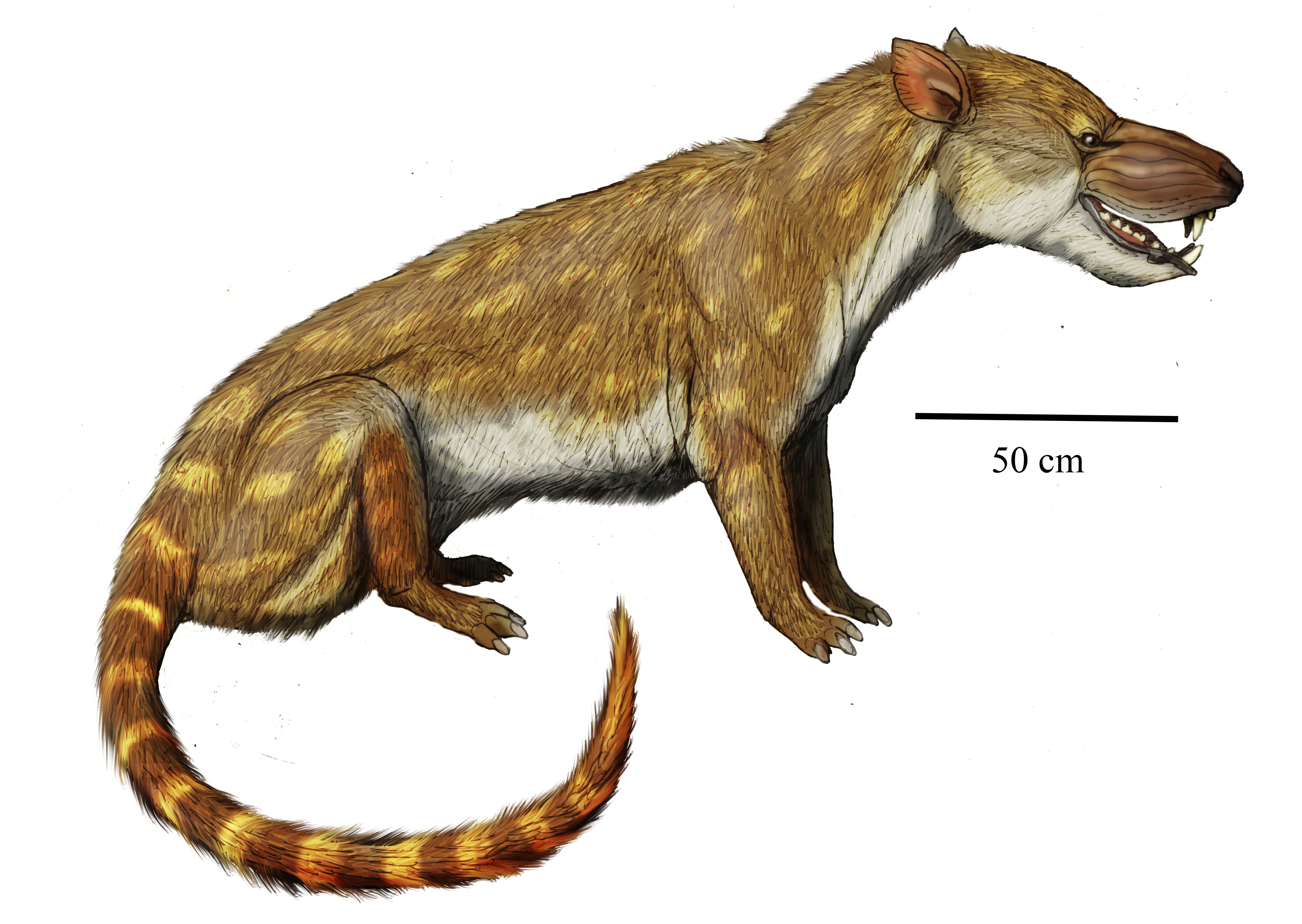
- M. robustus

Scientific classification
- Kingdom: Animalia
- Phylum: Chordata
- Class: Mammalia
- Order: †Mesonychia
- Family: †Mesonychidae
- Genus: †Mongolonyx; Szalay & Gould, 1966

Species
- M. dolichognathus (type); M. robustus Dashzeveg, 1976

= Mongolonyx =

Mongolonyx Temporal range: Early Eocene-Middle Eocene (Arshantan to Irdinmanhan) 52–42.7 Ma

Extinct genus of mammals

Mongolonyx is an extinct genus of mesonychid that lived from the Early to Middle Eocene in Inner Mongolia (China). M. dolichognathus, the type species, was described by Szalay and Gould (1966). M. dolichognathus fossils have been found in the Irdin Manha beds, in Inner Mongolia. It was a huge carnivorous animal comparable in size to a large bear.
