= Gashatan =

Asian land mammal age

The Gashatan is an Asian Land Mammal Age (ALMA), a biozone of Asian mammal fossils, dated from around 59.2–56.0 million years ago. The Gashatan lies within the global Thanetian stage, the last stage of the Paleocene series. It follows the Nongshanian ALMA and precedes the Bumbanian ALMA. The Gashatan is roughly equivalent to the upper Tiffanian through Clarkforkian North American Land Mammal Ages (NALMAs).

The start of the Gashatan is marked by the earliest rodents in Asia, as well as the earliest fossils of coryphodontid pantodonts, uintatheres, and hyaenodonts on the continent. Multituberculates reappear in the Asian fossil record after a gap earlier in the Paleocene. The Gashatan is named after the Gashato fauna in the Nemegt Basin of Mongolia. In China, it is also known as the Bayanulanian.

== Formations ==
Gashatan geological formations include:

- Mongolia:
  - Gashato / Khashat Formation (Gashato fauna)
  - Naran Bulak Formation (Naran, Zhigden, and Bugin members)
- China:
  - Lower Nomogen Formation (Subeng, Bayan Ulan, Erden Obo faunas) (Inner Mongolia)
  - Taizicun Formation (Xinjiang)
  - Dabu Formation (Xinjiang)
  - Shuangtasi Formation (Anhui)
  - Tujinshan Formation (Anhui)
  - Limuping Formation (Hunan)
  - Pinghu Formation (Jiangxi)
- Kazakhstan:
  - Zhylga 1a fauna
