= Hukoutherium =

Hukoutherium Temporal range: Paleocene-Eocene

Scientific classification
- Kingdom: Animalia
- Phylum: Chordata
- Class: Mammalia
- Infraclass: Placentalia
- Order: †Mesonychia
- Family: †Mesonychidae
- Genus: †Hukoutherium; Chow, Chang, Wang & Ting, 1973

Species
- H. ambigum; H. shimemensis

Extinct genus of mammals

Hukoutherium is an extinct genus of mesonychid which lived during the middle Paleocene in Asia and was named by Chow. The genus became extinct during the Eocene.

Hukoutherium is known from a mandible with incisors, canines, and broken dentaries, a crushed crania and fragmentary bones.

== Species ==
- Genus Hukoutherium
  - Hukoutherium ambigum
  - Hukoutherium shimemensis
