= Nongshanian =

Asian land mammal age

The Nongshanian is an Asian land mammal age (ALMA), a biozone of Asian mammal fossils, equivalent to part of the Paleocene epoch (around 62.2 to 59.2 million years ago). It follows the Shanghuan ALMA and precedes the Gashatan ALMA. The Nongshanian is named after the Nongshan Formation in Guangdong, and marks the earliest arctostylopids in Asia.

The base of the Nongshanian is near the boundary between polarity chrons C27n and C26r. The top of the Nongshanian is not directly dated, but it is probably close to the end of the Selandian stage (middle Paleocene), somewhere between chrons C26r and C25r. The Nongshanian is likely equivalent to most of the Tiffanian North American land mammal age (NALMA).

== Formations ==
Nongshanian geological formations are exclusively found in China. They include:

- Nongshan Formation (Guangdong)
- Guchengcun Formation (Guangdong)
- Chijiang Formation (Jiangxi)
- Doumu Formation (Anhui)
- uppermost Wanghudun Formation (Anhui)
- Dazhang Formation (Henan)
- Xindoupo site (Hubei)
