= Thanetian =

Third and last age of the Paleocene Epoch

- 59.24 – 56.00 Ma

Chronology
← / PETM; ← / First Antarctic permanent ice-sheets; ← / K-Pg mass extinction
Subdivision of the Paleogene according to the ICS, as of 2024. Vertical axis scale: Millions of years ago
- Formerly part of: Tertiary Period/System

Etymology
- Name formality: Formal

Usage information
- Celestial body: Earth
- Regional usage: Global (ICS)
- Time scale(s) used: ICS Time Scale

Definition
- Chronological unit: Age
- Stratigraphic unit: Stage
- Time span formality: Formal
- Lower boundary definition: Base of magnetic polarity chronozone C26n
- Lower boundary GSSP: Zumaia Section, Basque Country, Spain; 43.2996°N 2.2609°W
- Lower GSSP ratified: 2008
- Upper boundary definition: Strong negative anomaly in δ^{13}C values at the PETM
- Upper boundary GSSP: Dababiya section, Luxor, Egypt; 25.5000°N 32.5311°E
- Upper GSSP ratified: 2003

The Thanetian is, in the ICS Geologic timescale, the latest age or uppermost stratigraphic stage of the Paleocene Epoch or Series. It spans the time between 59.24 and 56 Ma. The Thanetian is preceded by the Selandian Age and followed by the Ypresian Age (part of the Eocene). The Thanetian is sometimes referred to as the Late Paleocene.

== Stratigraphic definition ==
The Thanetian was established by Swiss geologist Eugène Renevier in 1873. The Thanetian is named after the Thanet Formation, the oldest Cenozoic deposit of the London Basin, which was first identified in the area of Kent (southern England) known as the Isle of Thanet.

The base of the Thanetian Stage is laid at the base of magnetic chronozone C26n. The references profile (Global Boundary Stratotype Section and Point) is in the Zumaia section (43° 18'N, 2° 16'W) at the beach of Itzurun, Pais Vasco, northern Spain. Fossils of the unicellular planktonic marine coccolithophore Areoligeria gippingensis make their first appearance at the base of the Thanetian, and help define its lowest stratigraphic boundary.

The top of the Thanetian Stage (the base of the Ypresian) is defined at a strong negative anomaly in δ^{13}C values at the global thermal maximum at the Paleocene-Eocene boundary.

The Thanetian Stage is coeval the lower Neustrian European land mammal age (it spans the Mammal Paleogene zone 6 and part of zones 1 through 5.), the upper Tiffanian and Clarkforkian North American land mammal ages, the Riochican and part of the Itaboraian South American land mammal ages and the upper Nongshanian and Gashatan Asian land mammal ages. The Thanetian is contemporary with the middle Wangerripian regional stage of Australia and the upper Ynezian regional stage of California. It overlaps the obsolete regional stages Landenian and Heersian of Belgium.

== Palaeontology ==
The Sézanne flora is a fossil assemblage preserved in freshwater limestone deposits at Sézanne, laid down during the Thanetian Age, when Europe enjoyed a tropical climate. In the lagerstätte, leaves, entire flowers and seeds are minutely preserved. Also, the first representatives of Proboscidea appeared, Eritherium.

== Climate ==
This period was characterized by temperatures warmer than those of today. Global sea level fluctuations were governed by the 1.2 Myr obliquity modulation cycle.

== See also ==
- Paleocene–Eocene Thermal Maximum
