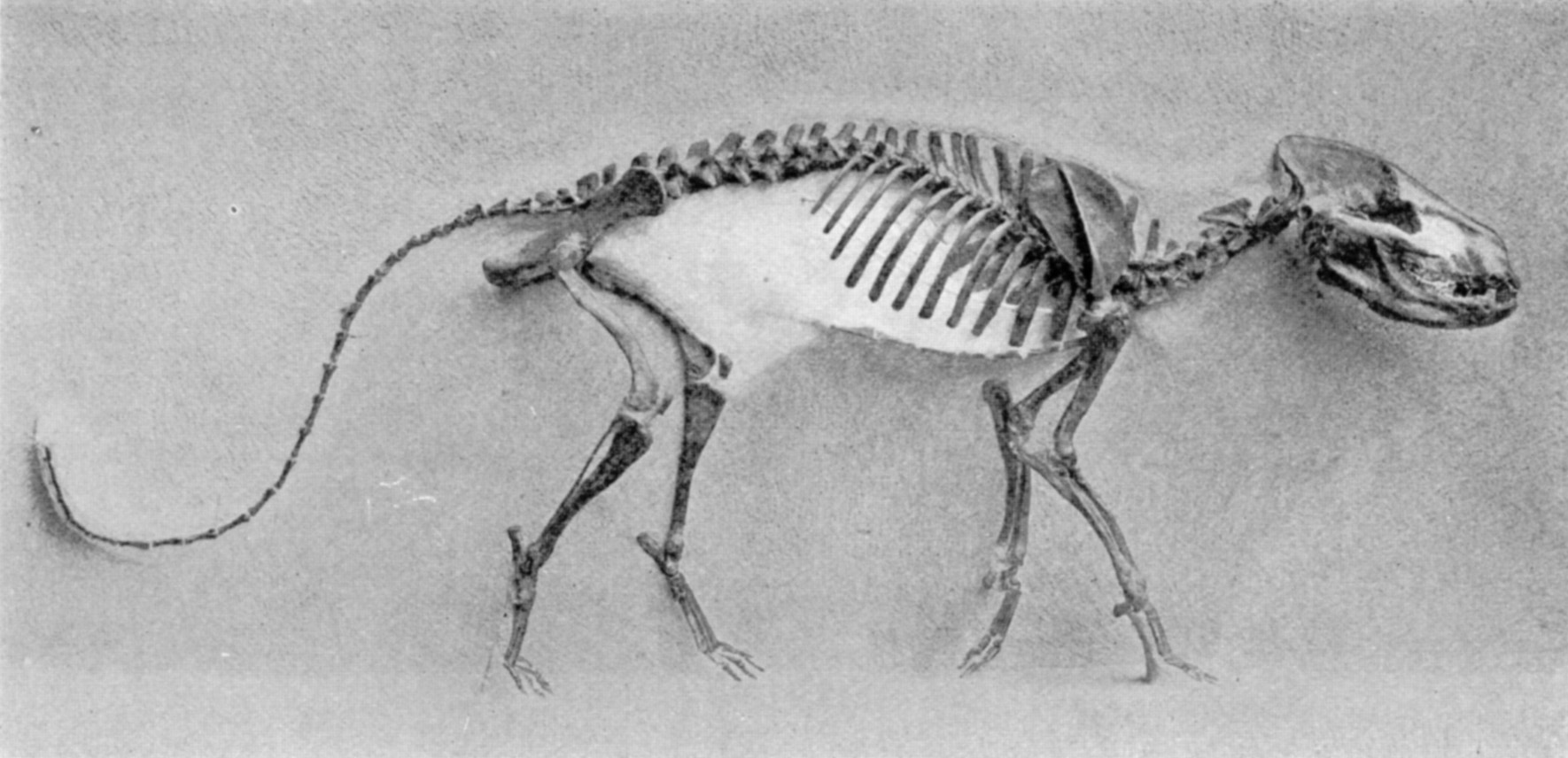
- Synoplotherium lanius skeleton on display at the Peabody Museum of Natural History (holotype of Dromocyon vorax).

Scientific classification
- Kingdom: Animalia
- Phylum: Chordata
- Class: Mammalia
- Order: †Mesonychia
- Family: †Mesonychidae
- Genus: †Synoplotherium; Cope, 1872

Type species
- †Synoplotherium lanius Cope, 1872

Synonyms
- Dromocyon vorax Marsh, 1876

= Synoplotherium =

Synoplotherium Temporal range: Eocene

Extinct genus of mammals

Synoplotherium (synonym Dromocyon) is an extinct genus of relatively small, wolf-like mesonychids that lived 50 million years ago, in what is now Wyoming.

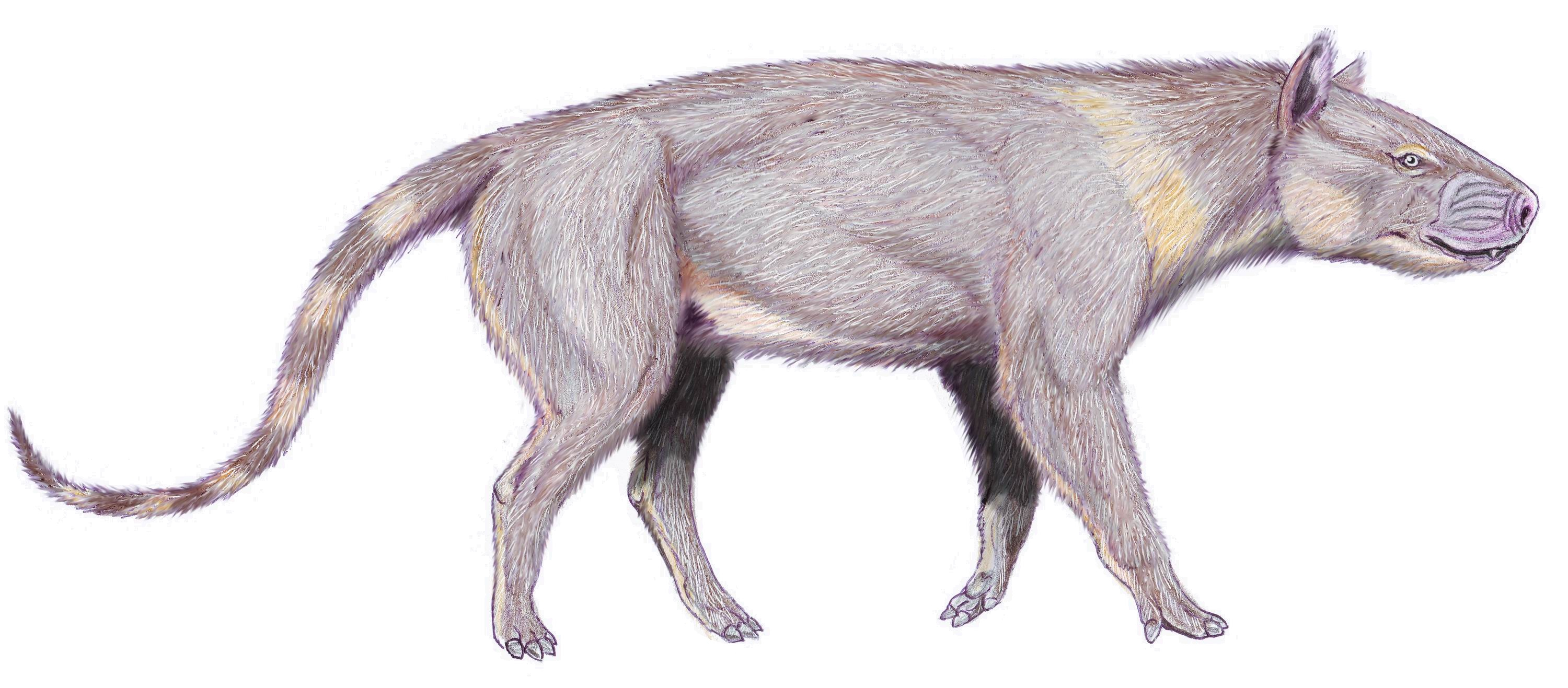
Synoplotherium lanius

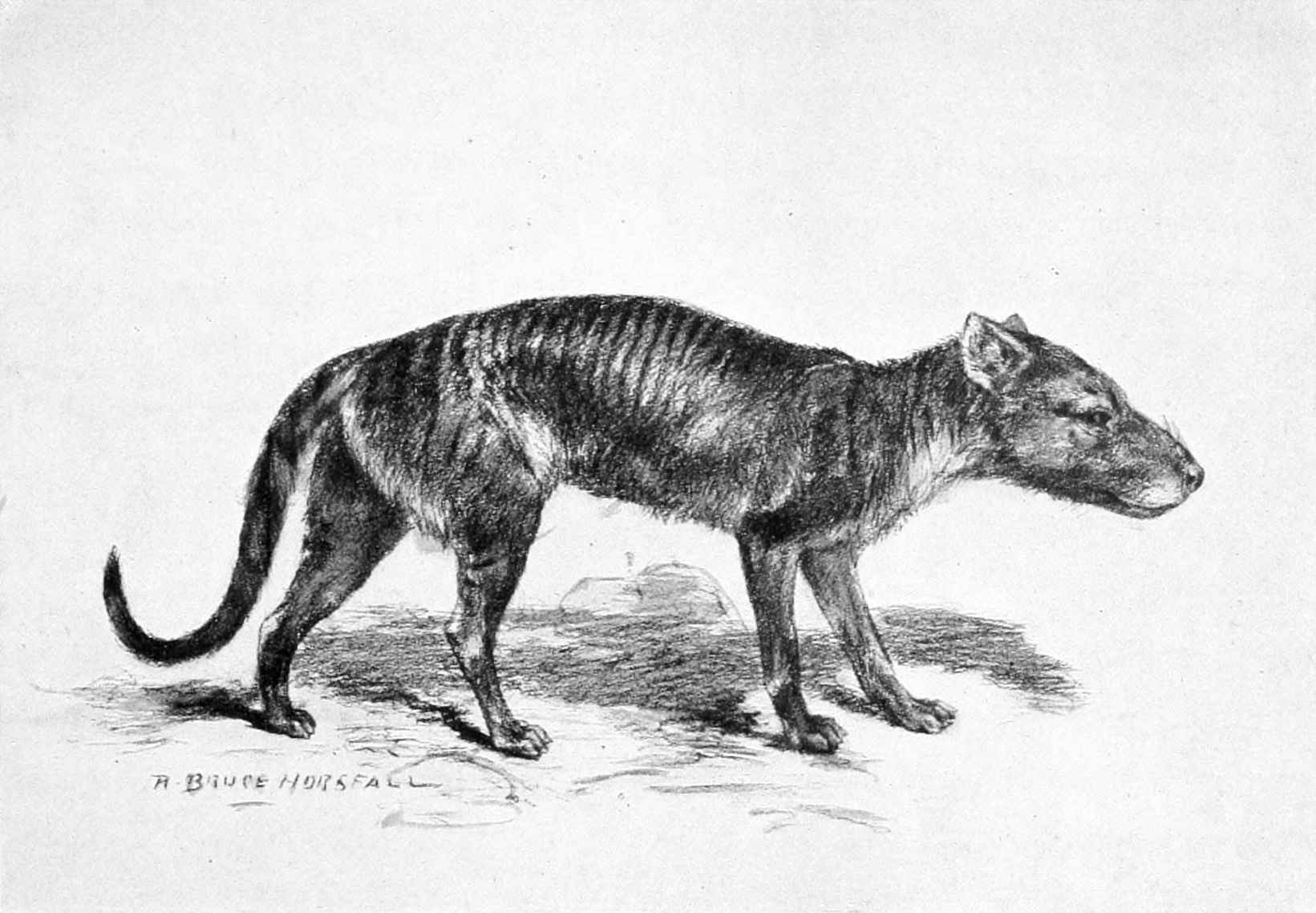
Restoration by Robert Bruce Horsfall

Synoplotherium coexisted with its larger relative, Mesonyx. Very little else remains known about this mesonychid since its discovery in 1875.

== Pathology ==
The specimen of Synoplotherium on display at the Peabody Museum of Natural History has a fractured lower jaw. The jaw is cracked right at the midpoint and shows signs of healing. Evidence in the form of its worn down teeth show the animal survived to old age.
