= Arshantan =

The Arshantan age is a period of geologic time (~52.1–47.8 Ma) within the Early Eocene epoch of the Paleogene used more specifically with Asian Land Mammal Ages. It follows the Bumbanian age and precedes the Irdinmanhan age.
