= Bridgerian North American Stage =

North American faunal stage

The Bridgerian North American Stage on the geologic timescale is the North American faunal stage according to the North American Land Mammal Ages chronology (NALMA), dated to 50.1 million years ago to 46.3 million years ago.

It is usually considered to overlap the Ypresian and Lutetian within the Eocene epoch.

The Bridgerian is preceded by the Wasatchian and followed by the Uintan NALMA stages.

== Substages ==
The Bridgerian is considered to contain the following substages:

- Twinbuttean: Lower boundary source of the base of the Bridgerian (approximate).
- Lutetian which is contained within the Middle Eocene sharing the lower boundary. The Lutetian overlaps with New Zealand's Arnold epoch, Dannevirke epoch, Bortonian stage, and Heretaungan stage.
