= Lutetian =

Second age of the Eocene Epoch

- 48.07 – 41.03 Ma

Chronology
← / PETM; ← / First Antarctic permanent ice-sheets; ← / K-Pg mass extinction
Subdivision of the Paleogene according to the ICS, as of 2024. Vertical axis scale: Millions of years ago
- Formerly part of: Tertiary Period/System

Etymology
- Name formality: Formal

Usage information
- Celestial body: Earth
- Regional usage: Global (ICS)
- Time scale(s) used: ICS Time Scale

Definition
- Chronological unit: Age
- Stratigraphic unit: Stage
- Time span formality: Formal
- Lower boundary definition: FAD of the calcareous nannofossil Blackites inflatus
- Lower boundary GSSP: Gorrondatxe section, Western Pyrenees, Basque Country, Spain; 43.3796°N 3.0143°W
- Lower GSSP ratified: April 2011
- Upper boundary definition: Not formally defined
- Upper boundary definition candidates: Calcareous nannofossil near LAD of the Haptophyte Reticulofenestra reticulata
- Upper boundary GSSP candidate section(s): Contessa highway section, Gubbio, Central Apennines, Italy

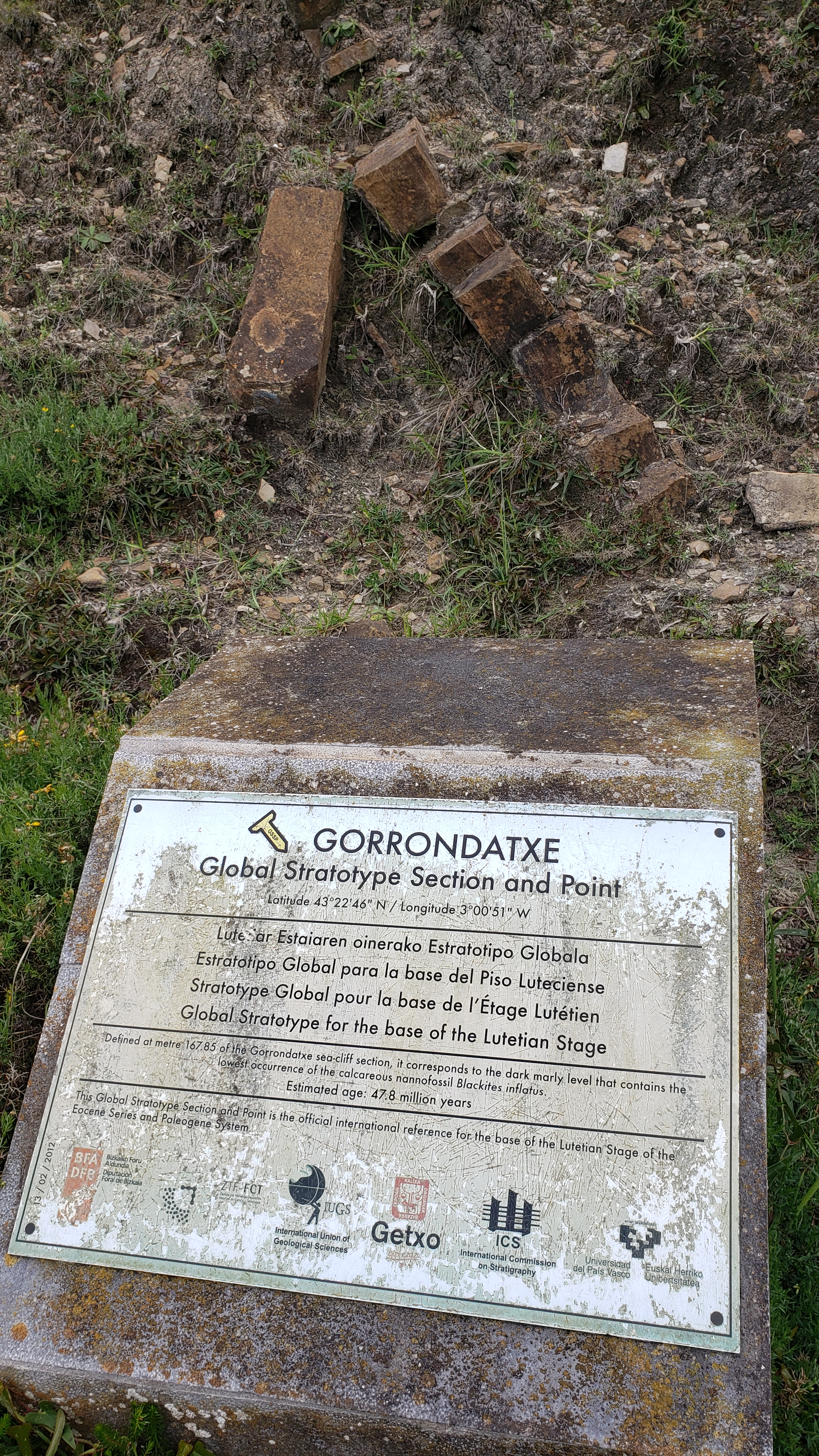
Global stratotype for the base of the Lutetian Stage

The Lutetian is, in the geologic timescale, a stage or age in the Eocene. It spans the time between 48.07 and 41.03 Ma. The Lutetian is preceded by the Ypresian and is followed by the Bartonian. Together with the Bartonian it is sometimes referred to as the Middle Eocene Subepoch.

== Stratigraphic definition ==
The Lutetian was named after Lutetia, the Latin name for the city of Paris. The Lutetian Stage was introduced in scientific literature by French geologist Albert de Lapparent in 1883 and revised by A. Blondeau in 1981.

The base of the Lutetian Stage is at the first appearance of the nanofossil Blackites inflatus, according to an official reference profile (GSSP) established in 2011. Of two candidates located in Spain, the Gorrondatxe section was chosen.

The top of the Lutetian (the base of the Bartonian) is at the first appearance of calcareous nanoplankton species Reticulofenestra reticulata.

The Lutetian overlaps with the Geiseltalian and lower Robiacian European Land Mammal Mega Zones (The Lutetian Stage spans the Mammal Paleogene zones 11 through 15.), the upper Bridgerian and Uintan North American Land Mammal Ages, the upper Arshantan and Irdinmanhan Asian Land Mammal Ages, and the Mustersan and lower Divisaderan South American Land Mammal Ages. It is also coeval with the middle Johannian regional stage of Australia and the upper Ulatisian and lower Nanzian regional stages of California.
