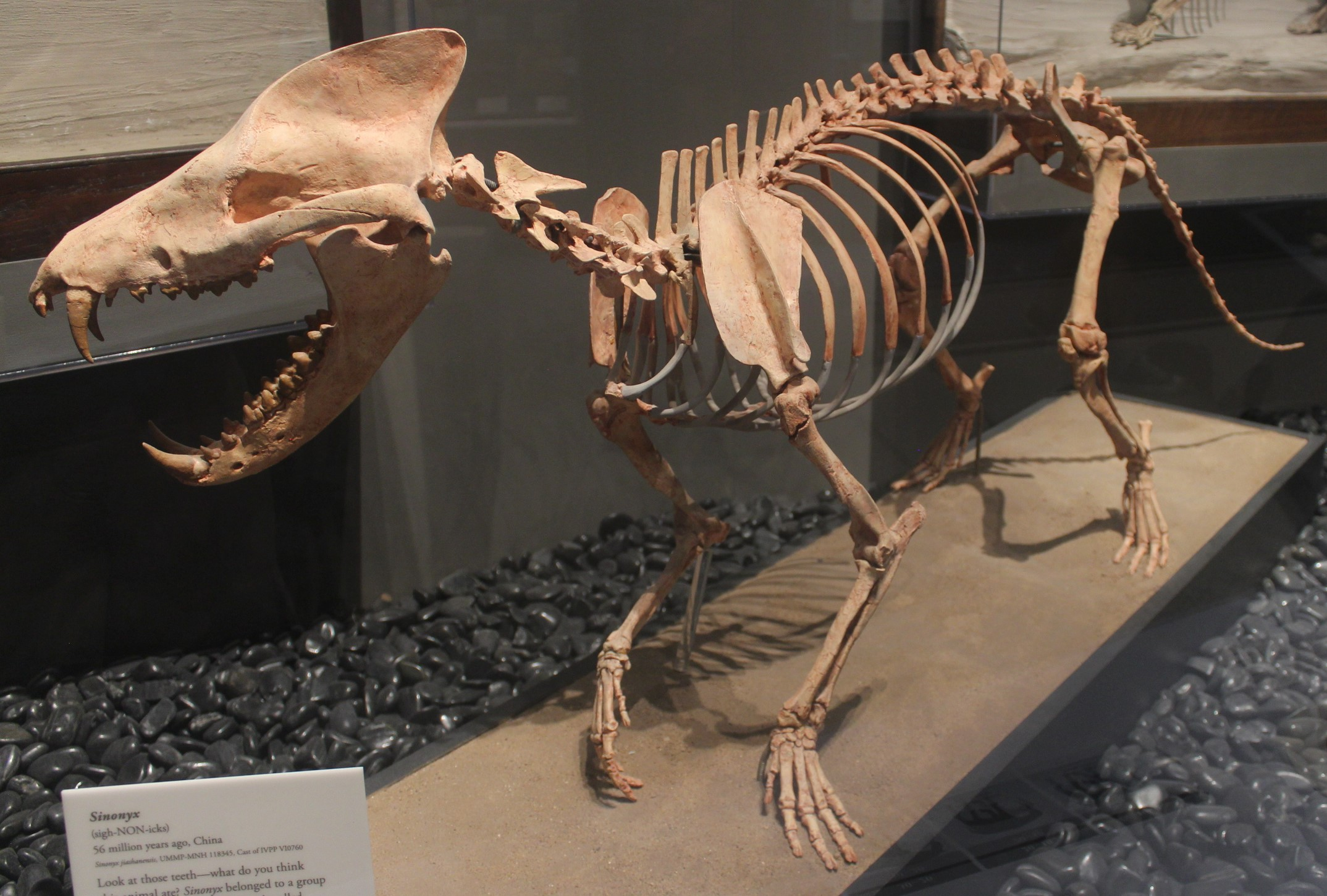
- Skeleton cast of S. jiashanensis holotype (IVPP V10760), University of Michigan Museum of Natural History

Scientific classification
- Kingdom: Animalia
- Phylum: Chordata
- Class: Mammalia
- Order: †Mesonychia
- Family: †Mesonychidae
- Genus: †Sinonyx; Zhou et al. 1995

Species
- S. jiashanensis Zhou et al. 1995

= Sinonyx =

Sinonyx Temporal range: Late Paleocene

Extinct genus of mammals

Sinonyx ("Chinese claw") is a genus of extinct, superficially wolf-like mesonychid mammals from the late Paleocene of China. It is within the family Mesonychidae, and cladistic analysis of a skull of Sinonyx jiashanensis identifies its closest relative as Ankalagon. S. jiashanensis was found in Anhui, China (30.9°N 120.9°E, paleocoordinates 33.9°N 113.6°E), in the Tuijinshan formation.

== Description ==
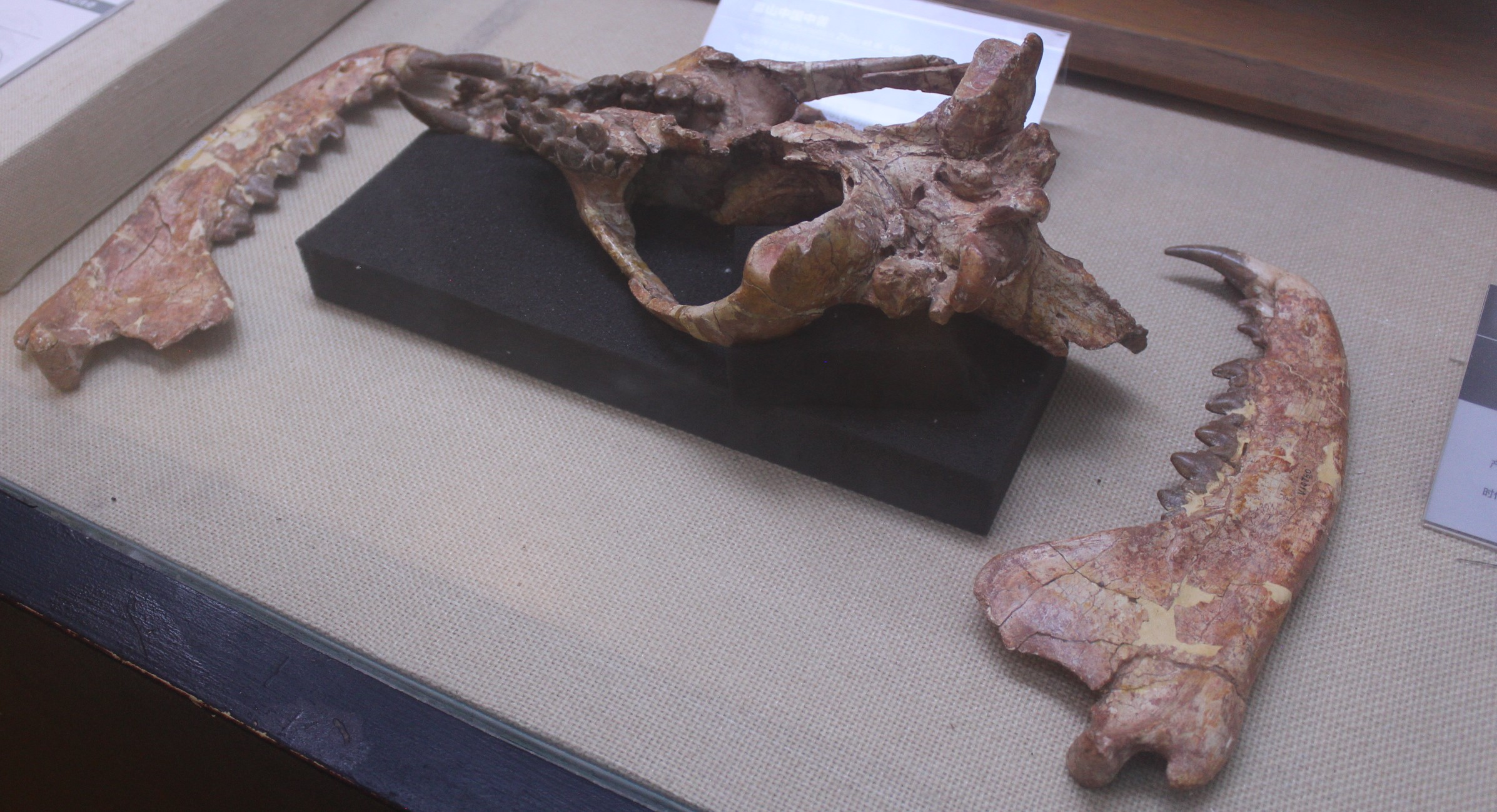
Holotype skull and jaws (IVPP V10760), Paleozoological Museum of China

Sinonyx was about the size of a modern grey wolf The canines were long and slender. The sagittal crest gave expanded attachment for the temporalis muscles.

== Morphologic similarities between Sinonyx and cetaceans ==
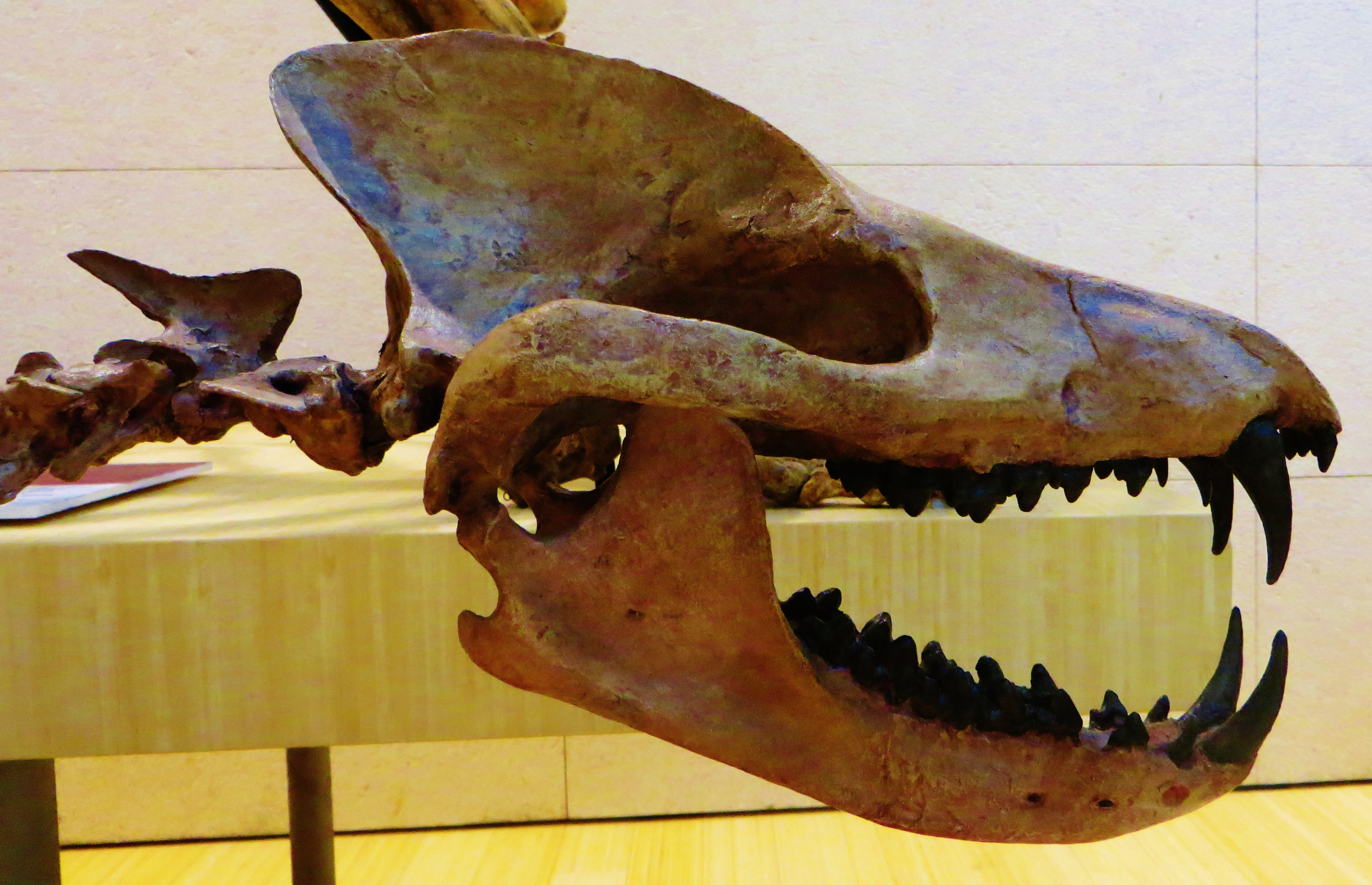
Skull

Morphologists long thought that Sinonyx was the direct ancestor of Cetacea (whales and dolphins), but the discovery of well-preserved hind limbs of archaic cetaceans as well as more recent DNA phylogenetic analyses disproves this idea, and this result is consistent with many molecular studies. Some studies have found Andrewsarchus, once considered a mesonychid, to form the sister group to the clade composed of Cetacea and Hippopotamidae along with Entelodontidae. Mesonychidae as defined by Szaly and Gould (1966) is probably paraphyletic or polyphyletic, with Hapalodectinae and Andrewsarchinae (represented by the lone skull of Andrewsarchus) wrongly assigned to the group. The subfamily Mesonychinae, which includes Sinonyx, appears to be monophyletic: mesonychids proper.

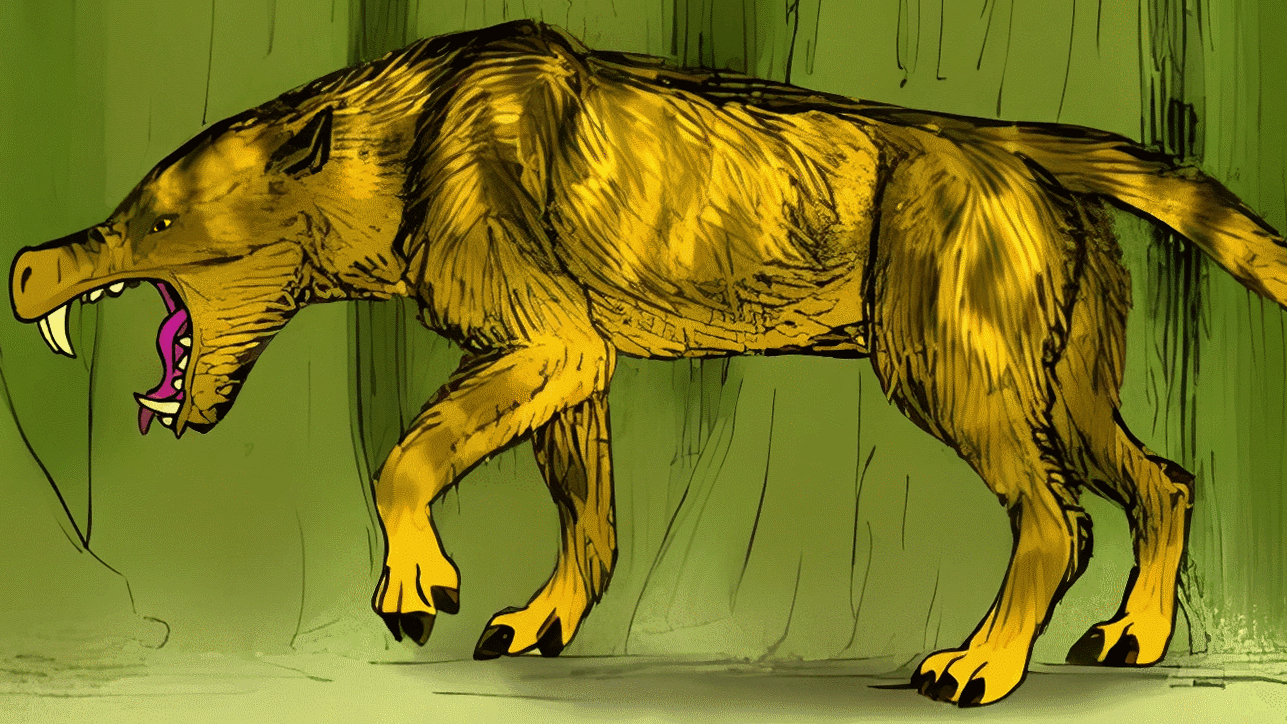
Sinonyx jiashanensis

Sinonyx is no longer considered ancestral to Cetacea, but has convergent features to early land-dwelling whales that suggest it may have had some similar adaptations. Sinonyx' elongated, narrow muzzle is often seen in animals that snap at small, fast-moving prey (such as mice among small canids, or small fish among dolphins). The unusual feature for mammal teeth is similar in archeocetes and led early researchers to believe mesonychids were ancestral to them. However, both groups began with generalized basal ungulate-type cheek teeth adapted for eating soft plant foods, and readapted them for a carnivorous diet; they are the only known mammal groups to have done this. Other characters Sinonyx has in common with early whales include an ossified tympanic bulla, which improves sensitivity to high-frequency sounds and is often seen in predators that hunt small prey by sound, and an jugular foramen, which gives more room for the cranial nerves that control swallowing and the balance between athletic activity and digestion.
