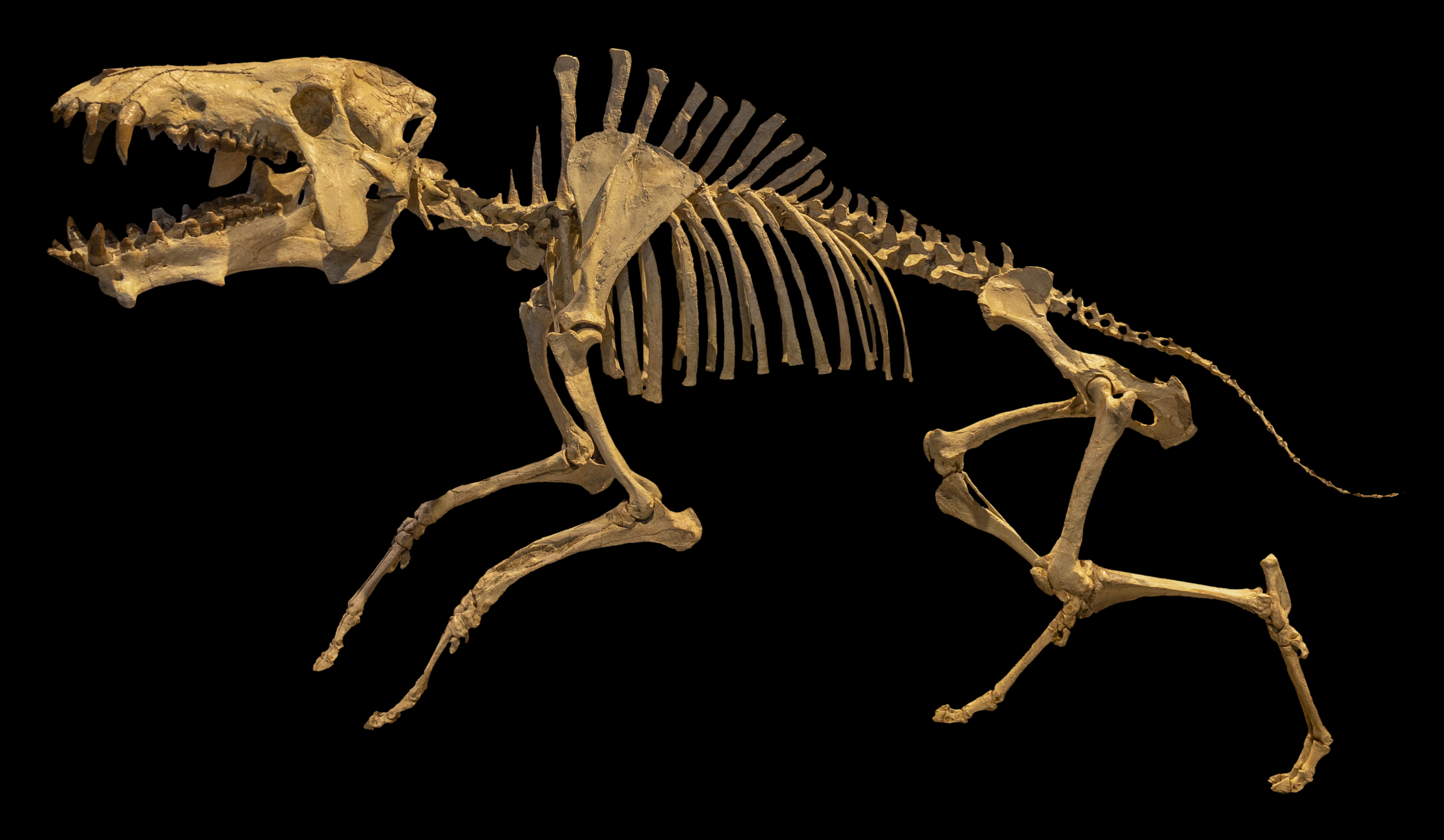
- Skeleton in the Royal Tyrrell Museum of Palaeontology

Scientific classification
- Kingdom: Animalia
- Phylum: Chordata
- Class: Mammalia
- Order: Artiodactyla
- Family: †Entelodontidae
- Genus: †Archaeotherium; Leidy, 1850

Type species
- †Archaeotherium mortoni Leidy, 1850

Other species
- See text

Synonyms
- Genus synonymy: Pelonax Cope, 1874; Choerodon Troxell, 1920 (preoccupied); Scaptohyus Sinclair, 1922; Synonyms of A. mortoni: Arctodon vetustum Leidy, 1852; Entelodon mortoni Leidy, 1853; Elotherium clavum Marsh, 1893; Archaeotherium clavus darbyi Troxell, 1920

= Archaeotherium =

Archaeotherium Temporal range: Late Eocene to Early Oligocene (Chadronian–Arikareean), 35–28 Ma Possible Early Miocene record — see text

Extinct genus of mammals

Archaeotherium (Ancient Greek: αρχαιοθήριον, meaning "ancient beast") is an extinct genus of entelodont artiodactyl endemic to North America during the Eocene and Oligocene epochs (35–28 mya). Archaeotherium fossils are most common in the White River Formation of the Great Plains, but they have also been found in the John Day Basin of Oregon and the Trans-Pecos area of Texas. Archaeotherium's fossils come from North America, between the Priabonian and Rupelian stages of the Eocene and Oligocene (35–28 million years ago). Up to fifteen species of Archaeotherium have been identified, which are divided into three subgenera. One contains the type species, A. mortoni, among others; another contains very large taxa formerly named Megachoerus and Pelonax; and the last contains A. calkinsi.

Archaeotherium was distinguished from most entelodonts by having an unusually long snout and large jugal flanges, extensions of the zygomatic arches that are characteristic of the group. The latter may be the result of sexual dimorphism or species differentiation. Healed bite marks on several Archaeotherium specimens suggest that it engaged in facial biting behaviours, similar to dromedary camels, and their faces consequently may have had thickened skin for protection. Archaeotherium had powerful neck muscles, which were supported by a bony hump comprising the first six thoracic vertebrae. Its digits were unfused, capable of spreading, and may have supported a fleshy pad, enabling it to move more effectively on soft terrain. Like other entelodonts, it had large incisors and canines, triangular premolars, and small, bunodont molars. Archaeotherium species varied in size, with A. mortoni having a skull length of 47 cm (19 in), and A. zygomaticus having a skull length of 78 cm (31 in).

Archaeotherium is thought to have been omnivorous, and exhibited strong adaptations for carnivory. Fossils of the early camelid Poebrotherium bearing entelodont bite marks indicate that Archaeotherium cached food, consuming the front half and saving the rear half to eat later. It was incapable of slicing meat due to its bunodont molars, and compensated for this by using its head and neck muscles together to rip off chunks of flesh. Archaeotherium mostly inhabited woodlands and open plains, though occasionally associated with riparian environments.

== Taxonomy ==
=== Early history ===
In 1850, Alexander Culbertson collected several fossils from the area around Fort Laramie, Wyoming. His father, Joseph, presented them to the Academy of Natural Sciences of Philadelphia. Two of the fossils were named by anatomist and palaeontologist Joseph Leidy. One of them was a small skull fragment, preserving the third and fourth left premolars. It was determined to be a new species, and was designated the holotype of a new taxon, Archaeotherium mortoni. Its generic name derives from the Greek αρχαιο ("ancient") and θήριον ("beast"). The type species, A. mortoni, was named after Samuel George Morton, then the president of the Academy of Natural Sciences of Philadelphia. Several more complete specimens were described in an 1853 paper, also by Leidy: a fragment of a mature specimen's skull, preserving in their entirety the two front molars and parts of the last molar and last premolar, all on both sides; and the rear of a young individual's skull, broken in two and missing the upper left half of the skull (including the zygomatic arch). Though perplexed by the anatomy it displayed, Leidy suggested that it was related to Entelodon magnus from Eurasia, if it did not represent the same taxon outright.

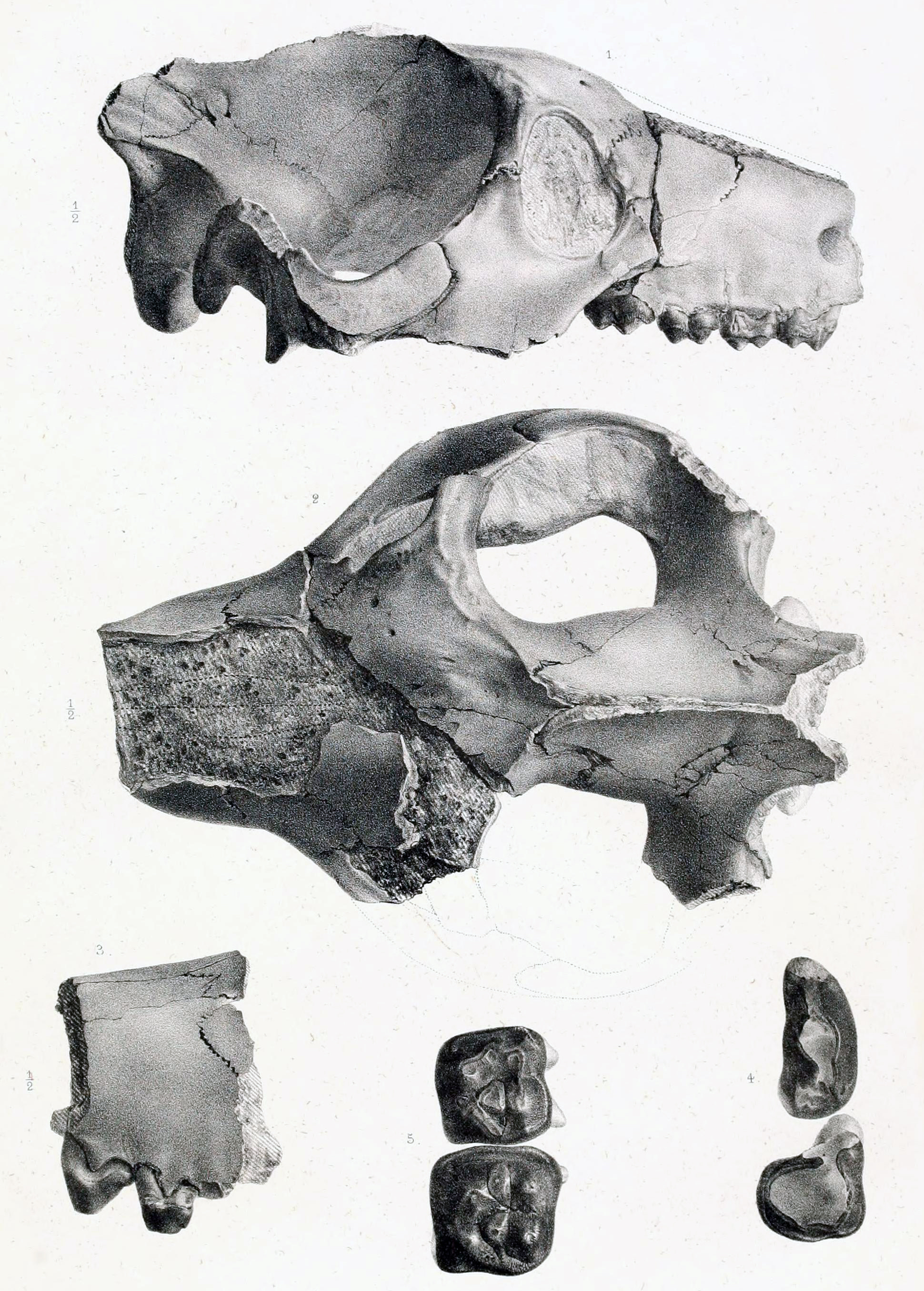
Partial skull and holotype skull fragment as figured by Joseph Leidy in 1853

In 1873, Othniel Charles Marsh named a new species of Elotherium (now Entelodon), E. crassum, based on remains found in Colorado. Shortly thereafter, Edward Drinker Cope named another new species, Elotherium ramosum. Subsequently, he reassigned both E. crassum and E. ramosum to a genus of their own, Pelonax. In 1951, James Reid MacDonald lumped Pelonax into Archaeotherium, though opted to retain it as a subgenus. In 2007, Scott Foss fully synonymised Pelonax with Archaeotherium.

In 1920, geologist Edward Leffingwell Troxell described a new entelodont genus, Megachoerus, as part of a series of papers discussing Marsh's entelodontid collection. In that paper, he designated M. zygomaticus as the type species. A second species, M. latidens, was also assigned. In 2007, Scott Foss synonymised Megachoerus with Archaeotherium. In the same series of papers that named Megachoerus, Troxell named the new taxon "Choerodon" calkinsi, for remains formerly assigned to Daeodon and Elotherium; however, Choerodon is preoccupied by a genus of wrasse. C. calkinsi is now regarded as a species of Archaeotherium, and may represent part of its own subgenus.

In 1922, William John Sinclair erected the new taxon Scaptohyus altidens, based on a partial skull, mandibles, and several bone fragments recovered from the Corral Draw locality of South Dakota in 1893 by R. E. Zuver. The species name, altidens, is in reference to the height of the third lower premolar. By 2007, Scaptohyus was regarded as a junior synonym of Archaeotherium.

In 1935, Erich Maren Schlaikjer named Dinohyus (now Daeodon) minimus, based on the symphyseal region of a juvenile's lower jaw. After comparisons with A. trippensis, D. minimus was reassigned to Archaeotherium in 1998. It may be the same taxon as A. trippensis.

=== Proposed synonymy with Entelodon ===
As far back as 1853, Joseph Leidy, the describer of Archaeotherium, suggested that it may have been part of the same genus as Entelodon magnus. In 1857, he reassigned Archaeotherium mortoni to the genus Elotherium without comment under the binomial name Elotherium imperator. A posthumous paper by Edward Drinker Cope, published in 1915, listed the same taxon as Entelodon imperator. In a 1909 revision of Entelodontidae, Olaf August Peterson resurrected Archaeotherium as a genus. He suggested that Archaeotherium and Entelodon could be distinguished by geography, as the former was North American and the latter was Eurasian. In 1940, William Berryman Scott and Glenn Lowell Jepsen noted strong similarities between the two genera, though they stopped short of synonymising them due to the incompleteness of the latter. In 1979, the relationship between the two genera was re-examined by French palaeontologist Michel Brunet. He contended that the differences between Archaeotherium and Entelodon were insufficient, and that the two genera should be synonymised; in this case, Entelodon, being named earlier, would take priority. This total synonymy has not been followed by subsequent authors, though Scott Foss noted that it remained a topic for investigation.

=== Inner systematics ===
Many species have been assigned to Archaeotherium over the years. In 2007, Foss divided Archaeotherium into three subgenera: Archaeotherium proper, subgenus A, and subgenus B. Subgenus A consists predominantly of very large species formerly referred to as Megachoerus and Pelonax, whereas Subgenus B consists of A. calkinsi, a species known from a single specimen from the John Day Formation of Oregon that has features of both Archaeotherium and Daeodon. Foss suggested the possibility of elevating them to genus level, though did not do so in that work.

A list of species according to work of Foss is as follows:

Taxon	Proposed subgenus	Author(s) of taxon	Taxon publication year
A. altidens	Subgenus A	Troxell	1920
A. calkinsi	Subgenus B	Sinclair	1905
A. caninus	Subgenus A	Troxell	1920
A. crassum	Archaeotherium	Marsh	1873
A. latidens	Subgenus A	Troxell	1920
A. lemleyi	Subgenus A	Macdonald	1951
A. marshi	Archaeotherium	Troxell	1920
A. mortoni	Archaeotherium	Leidy	1850
A. palustris	Archaeotherium	Schlaikjer	1935
A. praecursor	Subgenus A	Scott & Jepsen	1940
A. ramosum	Subgenus A	Cope	1874
A. scotti	Archaeotherium	Sinclair	1921
A. trippensis	Subgenus A	Skinner et al..	1968
A. wanlessi?	Archaeotherium?	Sinclair	1922
A. zygomaticus	Subgenus A	Troxell	1920

An additional species, "A." coarctatum, was formerly assigned to Archaeotherium. In 2007, it was assigned to a new genus, Cypretherium.

=== Classification ===
Archaeotherium belongs to Entelodontidae, a family whose exact taxonomic position has long been disputed. Similarities to members of Suina were recognised as far back as 1853. Henri Marie Ducrotay de Blainville is said to have suspected that the genus belonged to a carnivoran family he dubbed Subursi, based on characters now understood to be convergent. Karl Alfred von Zittel believed that Archaeotherium was a true suid, placing it within the subfamily Achaenodontinae. William Berryman Scott, in 1940, concurred that it was a relative of Achaenodon, though placed it within "Palaeodonta". This interpretation would be followed by authors who did not regard them as suiforms, and instead preferred to associate them with cebochoerids, choeropotamids, and helohyids. In 1955, Charles Lewis Gazin suggested that entelodonts were offshoots of Helohyinae (within a greater Dichobunidae), if not direct descendants of Helohyus proper. Since then, entelodontids have mostly been regarded as close relatives of Suidae (pigs) within Suina/Suiformes.

More recent phylogenetic analyses, such as that of Yu et al.. (2023), diverge from the classical suiform model. Instead, they suggest that the family lies close to Andrewsarchus, anthracotheres, hippopotamuses and whales, within Cetancodontamorpha.

Below is a reproduction of the Yu et al.. cladogram of Cetancodontamorpha:

- Cetacodontamorpha
  - Siamotherium
  - - - Hippopotamidamorpha
      - Cetaceamorpha
    - - - Erlianhyus
        - Andrewsarchus
        - Achaenodon
      - - Wutuhyus
        - - Proentelodon
          - Entelodontidae
            - V20124
            - - Brachyhyops viensis
              - - Eoentelodon
                - - Brachyhyops wyomingensis
                  - - Brachyhyops trofimovi
                    - Brachyhyops neimongolensis
                    - Archaeotherium
                    - - Entelodon
                      - Paraentelodon

In 1996, Spencer G. Lucas and Robert J. Emry suggested that Archaeotherium represented the terminal stage of a North American entelodont clade, which became extinct and was subsequently replaced by an Asian clade (itself ending with Daeodon) which entered North America near the end of the Oligocene. In 2007, Scott Foss instead proposed that Archaeotherium represents a late stage of a continuous North American lineage, beginning with Brachyhyops and terminating in Daeodon. Conversely, Yu et al.. (2023) recovered Archaeotherium as belonging to a polytomy with Brachyhyops and a clade consisting of Entelodon and Paraentelodon.

== Description ==
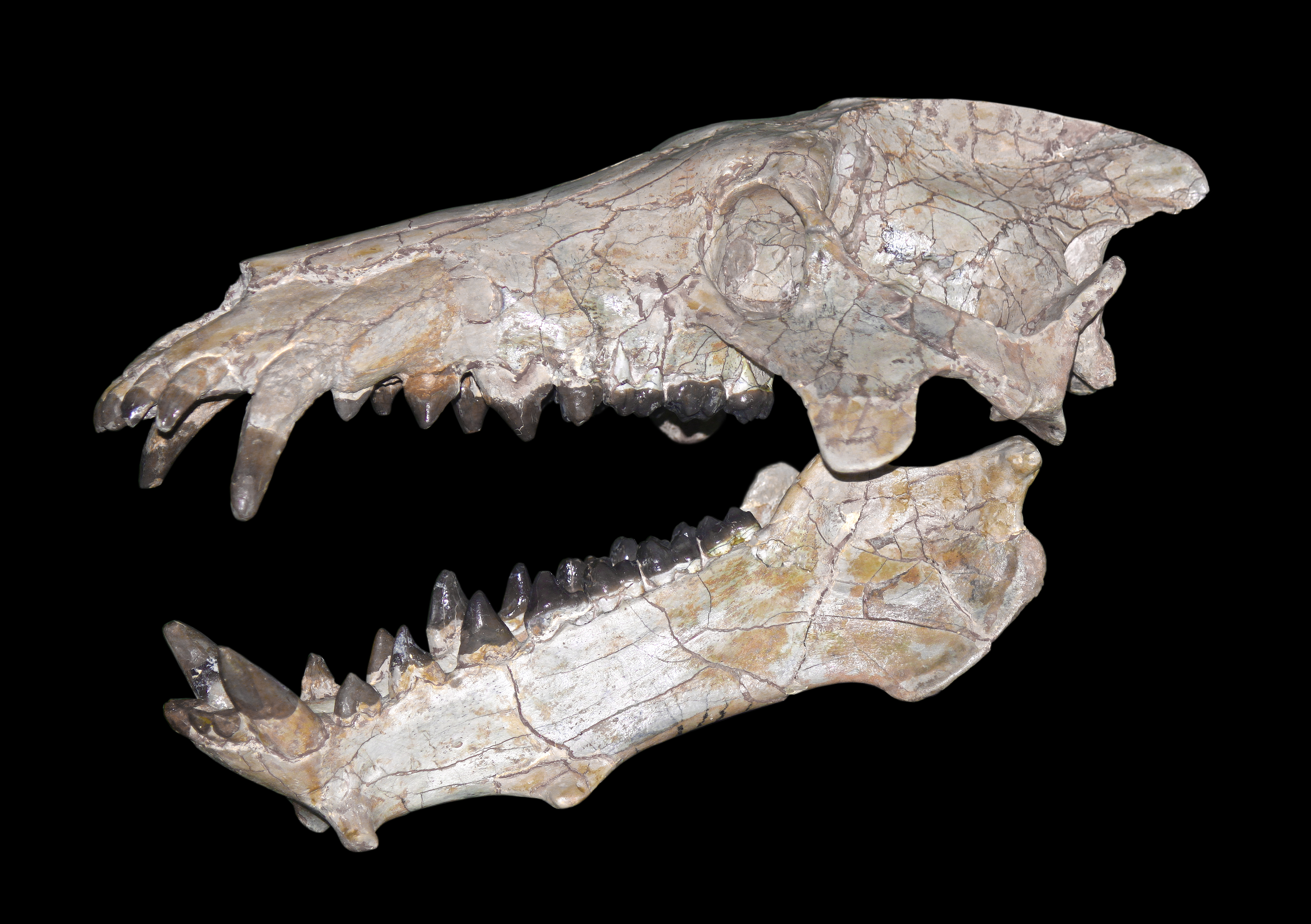
Skull cast in Staatliches Museum für Naturkunde Karlsruhe

=== Size ===
The many species assigned to Archaeotherium differ dramatically in size. The type species, A. mortoni, is relatively small and slender, estimated to have weighed around 150 kg (330 lb) and a skull length, measured condylobasally, (from the tip of the premaxilla to the back of the occipital condyles) of about 47 cm (19 in). The larger species, those formerly known as Megachoerus, were considerably larger. A. zygomaticus had a skull length of around 78 cm (31 in). A. calkinsi in particular is noted as being robust beyond what is observed in other entelodonts. The largest species of Archaeotherium was A. trippensis.

=== Skull ===
3D model of a Archaeotherium mortoni skull fossil

The skull length of Archaeotherium mortoni, is about 27% of the total head–body length, based on the partly restored skeleton of SDSM 3346: this is 8% smaller, proportionally, than in Daeodon. The genus Archaeotherium is characterised by having a particularly elongated face and prominent jugal flanges. These were extensions of the zygomatic arches, analogous to those of hippopotamuses. The jugal has a lightly developed posterior process that does not form a buttress on the front margin of the glenoid cavity. The Archaeotherium specimens initially assigned to "Megachoerus" and "Pelonax" bear massively enlarged jugal flanges, and a combination of a deep jaw and knob-like mandibular tubercles, respectively. The orbits (eye sockets) were forward-facing and fully enclosed by a postorbital bar. Unusually among entelodonts (with the exception of Brachyhyops), Archaeotherium's pterygoids bore a midline synarthrosis, meaning they were essentially incapable of movement. This was likely an adaptation to resisting stresses exerted on the back of the skull by the jaw muscles. The articular surface of Archaeotherium's dentary condyle is comparable in orientation to that of modern carnivorans. As such, it may have been able to open its jaws to a maximum gape of 109°. The sagittal crest and temporal fossae of entelodonts like Archaeotherium were very large, further indicating a strong bite force.

=== Dentition ===
Entelodonts such as Archaeotherium had the same general tooth morphology: large incisors and canines, triangular premolars, and small, bunodont molars. They possessed the typical placental dental formula of 3.1.4.33.1.4.3. The first and second incisors of Archaeotherium mortoni are relatively large, procumbent, and well-spaced. The canines are long and pointed. Together, the canines and incisors formed an effective device for grasping and puncturing. There are slight gaps between the premolars (diastemata), unlike in Daeodon. The premolars are transversely compressed, with high, pointed crowns. The third premolar is narrower than the fourth, and is convex labially. It is double rooted, has a single cusp, and only has slight posterior cingulum. The fourth premolar is triple-routed and described as cuboidal in shape. The third molar lacks a hypocone. No sexual dimorphism is observed in the dentition.

=== Postcrania ===
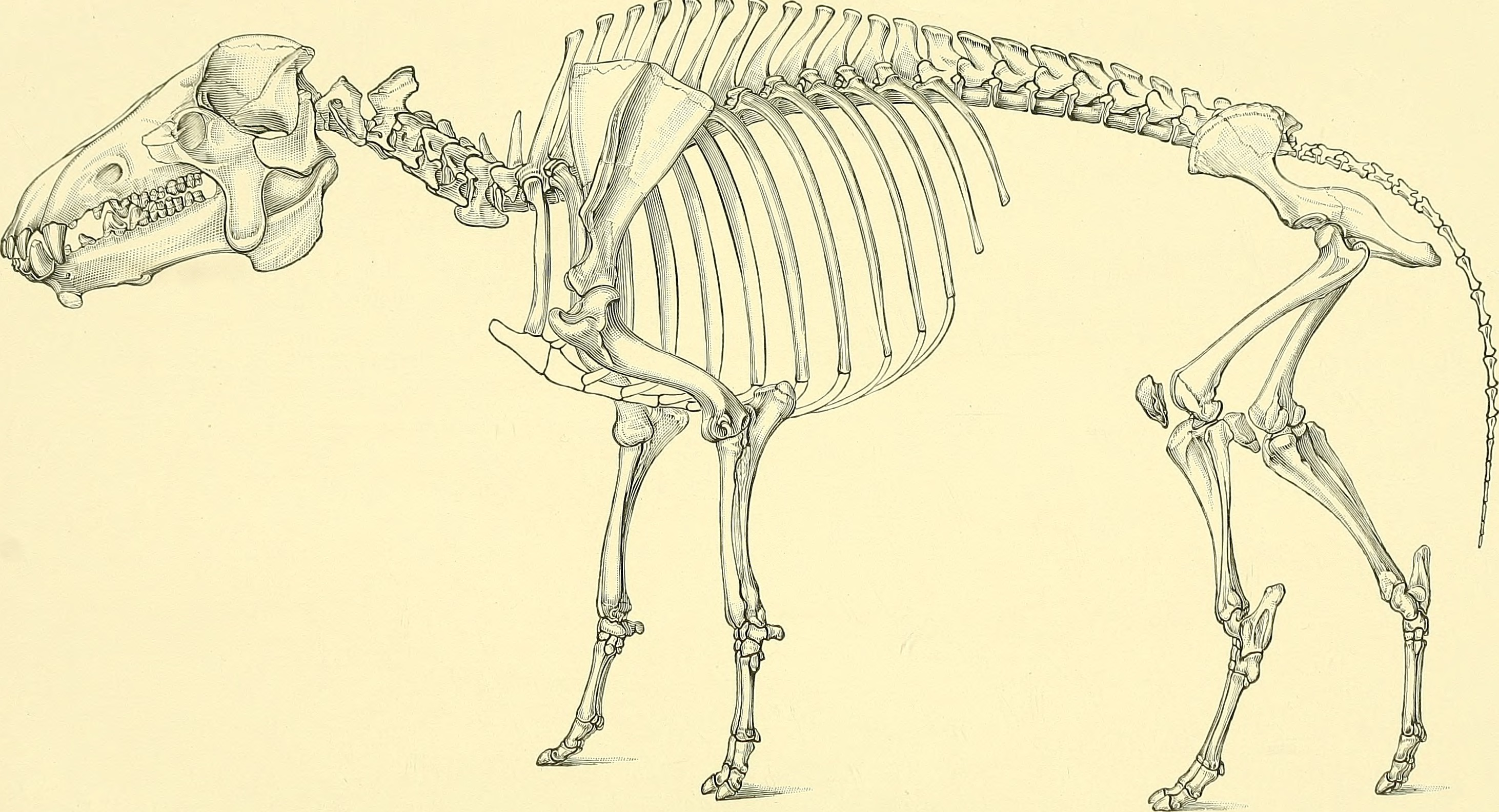
Lithographic skeletal reconstruction of Archaeotherium mortoni, by Frederik Van Iterson, 1894

Archaeotherium's postcranial elements were similar to those of other entelodonts. The neck had seven caudal vertebrae. The neck was short, robust, and accommodated strong muscles. These were further supported by a bony ridge, spanning the first six thoracic vertebrae, which likely formed a large hump in life. Archaeotherium had only two sacral vertebrae. The caudal vertebrae are unusual among artiodactyls, most closely resembling those of giraffes among the group. The ribs were surprisingly lightly built for such a large animal. The forelimbs were elongate, with a high and slender scapula and a massively constructed humerus. The feet were functionally didactyl (having two weight-bearing digits). Like most artiodactyls, they exhibited paraxony, distributing weight equally over the third and fourth digits. The digits were unfused like those of camelids, and the toes could spread; this, in conjunction with hypothetical foot pads, may have helped Archaeotherium move on soft terrain. Unlike the humerus, the femur was long and relatively slender, whereas the tibia was shorter and more robust; the fibula is very much reduced, though is not co-ossified.

== Palaeobiology ==
=== Intraspecific interactions ===
Young Archaeotherium had fairly small temporalis muscles, which increased in size as the animal matured. This suggests that, as in other entelodontids, the jugal flanges and strong jaws of the genus were involved in adult social interactions over obtaining and processing food. Further, the jugal flanges of Archaeotherium differ in shape and size among specimens. Some interpret this as evidence of sexual dimorphism, whilst others interpret it as evidence of intraspecies variation. Assuming the former, it is similar to that seen in giant forest hogs. Thus, it can be reasonably assumed that Archaeotherium's jugals supported large preorbital glands used for chemical communication, signalling readiness for mating. Healed bite-marks on the frontals, lacrimals and maxillae, as well as an A. scotti specimen with a damaged left cheek flange, suggest that at least some Archaeotherium populations engaged in agonistic facial biting. In such confrontations, one animal may have attempted to fit the head of the other in its mouth and bite down with the canines and incisors, similar to modern dromedary camels. The anterior tubercles of entelodonts such as Archaeotherium may have supported toughened skin, which would act as a buffer during such interactions.

=== Feeding and diet ===
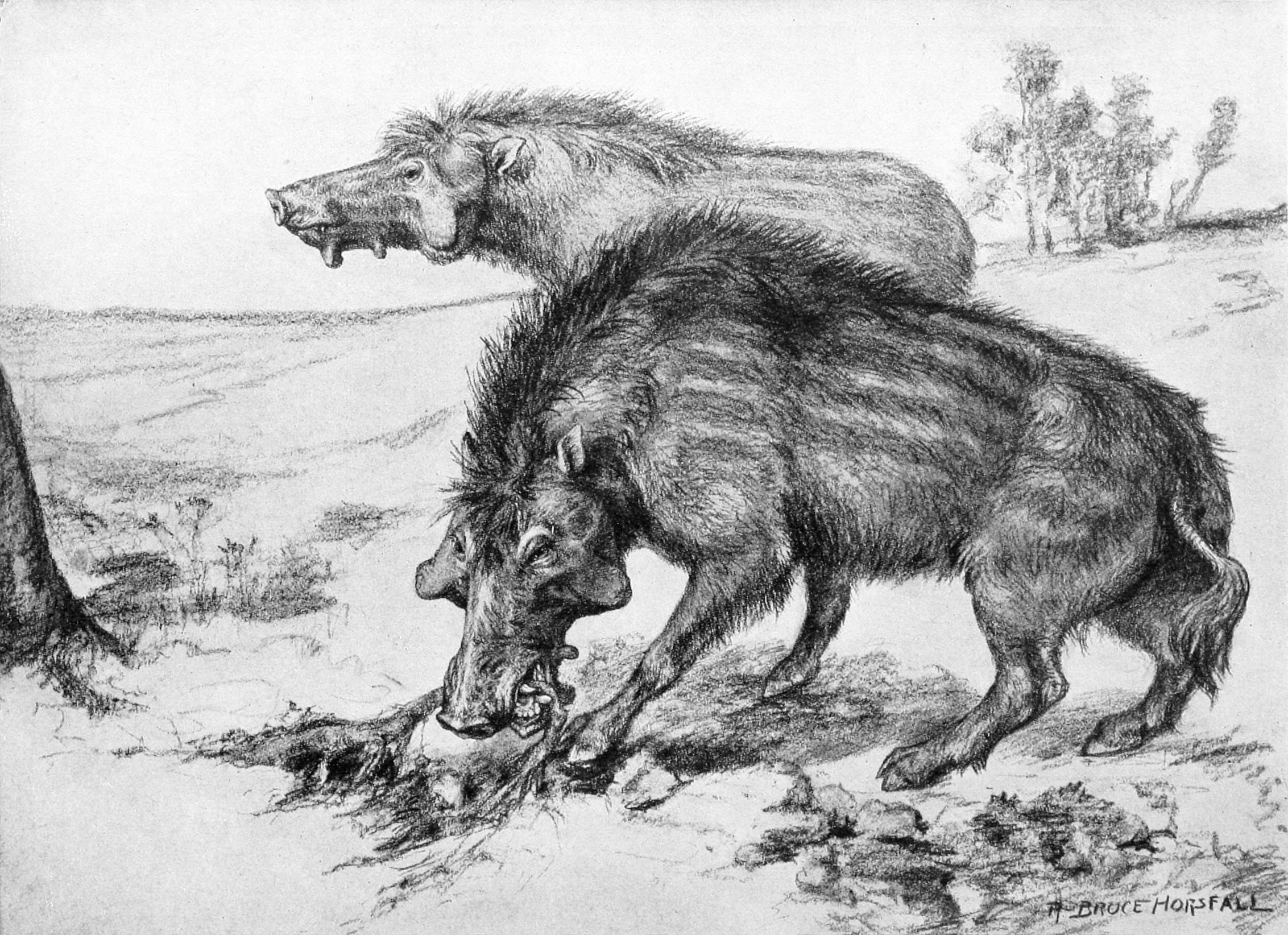
Restoration of Archaeotherium eating roots, by Robert Bruce Horsfall, 1913

Like other entelodonts, Archaeotherium is generally seen as a mixed feeder, with an inclination towards carnivory. The type species, A. mortoni, bore specialisations for biting and chewing resistant objects, such as hard fruits, stems, and bones. The jaws were enormously strong and operated largely by chopping, though exhibited enough lateral movement for the molars to grind objects. Archaeotherium's teeth show signs of uneven wear, indicating that it often favoured chewing on one side of the jaw. Unlike Daeodon, the teeth do not exhibit so-called "piecrust fractures". This suggests that, whereas Daeodon was more specialised for the consumption of large carcasses, Archaeotherium was not. Tooth wear patterns suggest that its front teeth were often used to strip leaves from plants, though there is a lack of soil scratches that would indicate rooting in the ground. Scott Foss, in 2001, interpreted this as the result of feeding on plants such as lianas. Dental microwear patterns differ between small-bodied and large-bodied Archaeotherium indicating size-driven niche partitioning, with large-bodied individuals displaying greater pitting, evidence of consumption of hard objects such as bones, nuts, and tubers. Smaller-bodied Archaeotherium had softer diets comparable in texture to those of present-day brown bears, wolves, and cheetahs.

Archaeotherium's dentition was incapable of slicing meat, like most extant mammalian predators: rather, it compensated using its strong neck musculature, using its head and neck together to tear off chunks of flesh. Fossil evidence suggests that in North America they may sometimes have hunted the early camelid Poebrotherium. Bite marks on the cervical vertebrae of the camels suggest that Archaeotherium ran alongside its prey while hunting, delivering crushing a bite to the neck and the back of the skull. The prey animal's body was then severed in half, and the rear section was consumed. The front half was stockpiled in a food cache to be consumed later.

=== Brain and senses ===
Endocasts of Archaeotherium's skull suggest that the brain was very small. The cerebellum was small, short and narrow, and the cerebral hemispheres were proportionally very small. However, the olfactory bulbs were relatively large, indicating that Archaeotherium had a keen sense of smell.

== Palaeoecology ==
Archaeotherium lived from the Chadronian to the Arikareean North American Land Mammal Ages (NNLMAs). The earliest occurrences of the genus are from the Chadronian of the White River Group. Specimens have been recovered from the White River Formation, John Day Formation, Brule Formation and Chadron Formation, as well as from the Trans-Pecos area of Texas. The latest known occurrence of the genus comes from the Turtle Butte Formation, which bears fossils of A. trippensis; the Turtle Butte represents either the late Oligocene or the early Miocene.

=== Palaeoenvironment ===
The White River Formation, from which many Archaeotherium fossils are known, extends from the Upper Eocene to the Middle Oligocene. Based on palaeosol analysis, the lower levels of the White River Formation represent a forested environment with a high water table, dominated by taproot-bearing dicotyledons. The upper levels, however, represent an open, sparsely vegetated plain. It is believed that this environmental shift reflects global drying trends across the Eocene–Oligocene boundary. The depositional environments of the Brule Formation, also part of the White River Group, are believed to have been a gallery forest and a wooded grassland, populated at least in part by hackberry trees (Celtis). The John Day Formation underwent a similar transformation to the White River Formation: the mid-Eocene Clarno Nuts Beds flora was tropical, while early Oligocene Slanting Leaf Beds held mostly temperate, deciduous taxa. Examples were maples (Acer), plane trees (Platanus), and oaks, (Quercus), along with an extinct member of the avocado family (Cinnamomophyllum). Smaller representatives of the late John Day Formation's fauna were soapberries (Dipteronia), roses (Rosa), and the evergreen shrub genus Mahonia. Archaeotherium is known to have inhabited all of these formations, preferring woodlands and open plains, though may have frequented riparian habitats.

Archaeotherium is known from the White River Group (including the Brule Formation and Chadron Formation), and the John Day Formation. The Chadron Formation preserves taxa such as the brontothere Megacerops and the hyaenodont Hyaenodon. The Orella Member of the Brule Formation, a subunit of the White River Group, bears the leptictid Leptictis, the aforementioned Hyaenodon, the nimravids Dinictis and Hoplophoneus, the amphicyonid Daphoenus, the canid Hesperocyon, the perissodactyls Hyracodon and Mesohippus (plus an indeterminate rhinocerotoid), the merycoidodonts Merycoidodon and Miniochoerus, the camelid Poebrotherium, the leptochoerid Stibartus, the hypertragulid Hypertragulus, the leptomerycid Leptomeryx, and the rodents Ischyromys and Paradjidaumo. The amynodont Metamynodon is known from certain parts of the Brule Formation. The Lower Blue Basin section of the John Day Formation preserves the metatherian Herpetotherium, the nimravids Dinictis and Hoplophoneus, the amphicyonid Temnocyon, the canids Archaeocyon, Enhydrocyon and Phlaocyon, the equids Mesohippus and Miohippus, the rhinocerotid Diceratherium, the tayassuids Perchoerus and Thinohyus, the merycoidodont Eporeodon, the agriochoerid Agriochoerus, the hypertragulid Hypertragulus, and the rodent Haplomys (plus an indeterminate eomyid). The Turtle Butte Formation, from which the latest species (A. trippensis) is known, preserves the canids Enhydrocyon and Leptocyon, the nimravid Hoplophoneus, the equid Archaeohippus, the merycoidodonts Megoreodon and Paramerychyus, and the camelid "Protomeryx" (Miotylopus) leonardi.
