= E. antiquus =

E. antiquus may refer to:

- Elephas antiquus, the straight-tusked elephant, an extinct species of elephant closely related to the living Asian elephant
- Entelodon antiquus, an extinct mammal species
