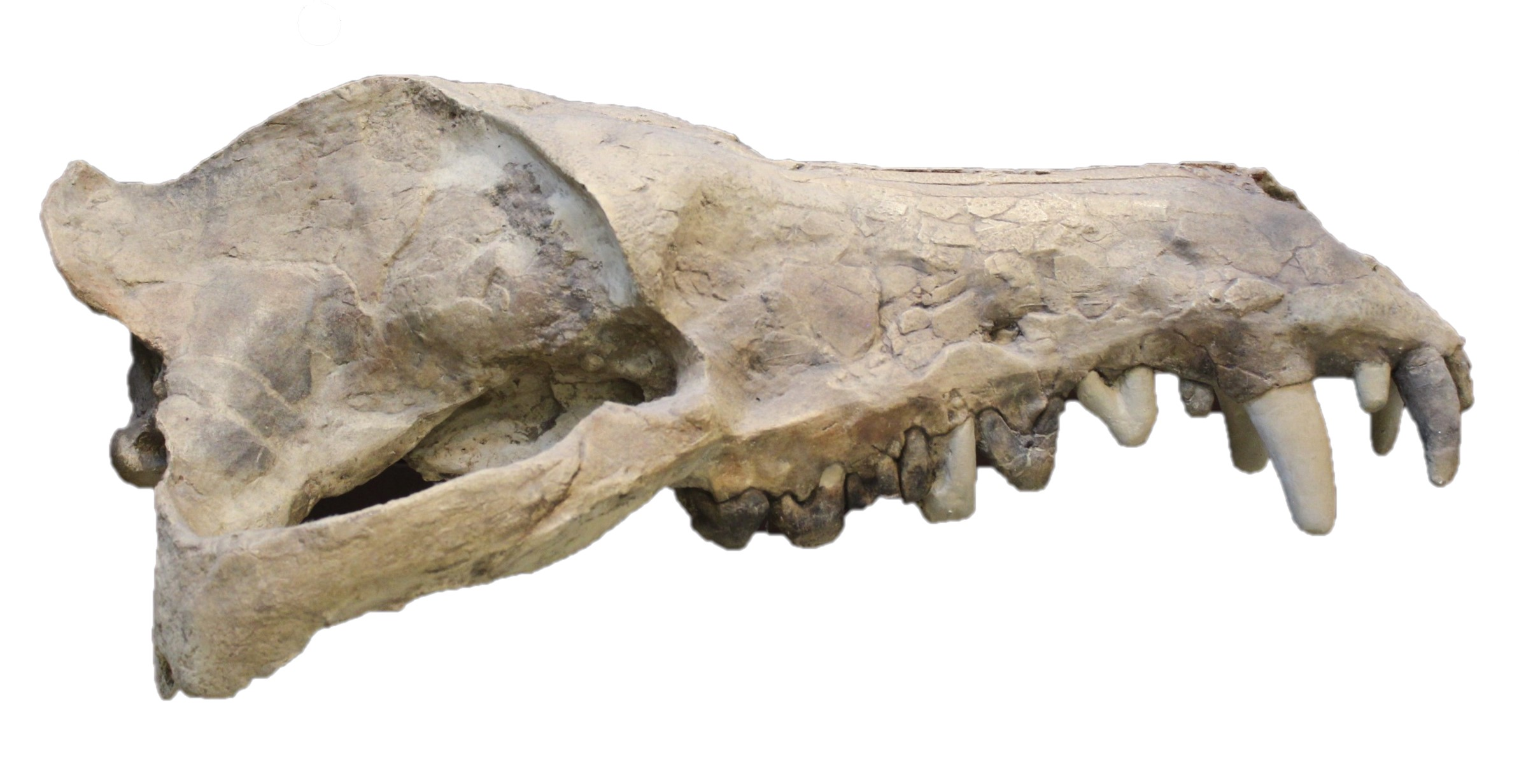
- Holotype skull of A. mongoliensis, held at the American Museum of Natural History

Scientific classification
- Kingdom: Animalia
- Phylum: Chordata
- Class: Mammalia
- Order: Artiodactyla
- Clade: Cetancodontamorpha
- Family: †Andrewsarchidae; Szalay & Gould, 1966
- Genus: †Andrewsarchus; Osborn, 1924

Type species
- †Andrewsarchus mongoliensis Osborn, 1924

Other species
- †Andrewsarchus crassum Ding et al., 1977

Synonyms
- Genus synonymy: Paratriisodon Chow, 1959; Species synonymy: A. mongoliensis; Paratriisodon henanensis Chow, 1959; Paratriisodon gigas Chow, Li, & Chang, 1973

= Andrewsarchus =

Andrewsarchus Temporal range: Middle Eocene, 47.8–42.7 Ma

Extinct genus of ungulate

Andrewsarchus (/ˌændruːˈsɑːrkəs/), meaning "Andrews' ruler", is an extinct genus of artiodactyl that lived during the Middle Eocene in what is now China. The genus was first described by Henry Fairfield Osborn in 1924 with the type species A. mongoliensis based on a largely complete cranium. A second species, A. crassum, was described in 1977 based on teeth. A mandible, formerly described as Paratriisodon, probably belongs to the Andrewsarchus as well. The genus has been historically placed in the families Mesonychidae or Arctocyonidae, or was considered to be a close relative of whales. It is now regarded as the sole member of its own family, Andrewsarchidae, and may have been related to entelodonts. Fossils of Andrewsarchus have been recovered from the Middle Eocene Irdin Manha, Lushi and Dongjun Formations of Inner Mongolia, each dated to the Irdinmanhan Asian land mammal age (Lutetian stage, 47.8–42.7 million years ago).

Andrewsarchus has historically been reputed as the largest terrestrial, carnivorous mammal given its skull length of 83.4 cm (32.8 in), though its overall body size was probably overestimated due to inaccurate comparisons with mesonychids, and it did not have the meat-slicing carnassial teeth of a hypercarnivore. Its incisors are arranged in a semicircle, similar to entelodonts, with the second rivalling the canine in size. The premolars are again similar to entelodonts in having a single cusp. The crowns of the molars are wrinkled, suggesting it was omnivorous or a scavenger. Unlike many modern scavengers, a reduced sagittal crest and flat mandibular fossa suggest that Andrewsarchus likely had a fairly weak bite force.

== Taxonomy ==
=== Early history ===
The holotype of Andrewsarchus mongoliensis is a mostly complete cranium (specimen number AMNH-VP 20135). It was recovered from the lower Irdin Manha Formation of Inner Mongolia during a 1923 palaeontological expedition conducted by the American Museum of Natural History (AMNH) of New York. Its discoverer was Kan Chuen-pao, also known as "Buckshot", a local man who trained at the AMNH and became assistant to the expedition's lead paleontologist, Walter Granger. Granger initially identified the fossil as the skull of an Entelodon. A drawing of the skull was sent to the museum, where it was identified by William Diller Matthew as belonging to "the primitive Creodonta of the family Mesonychidae". The specimen itself arrived at the museum and was described by Osborn in 1924. Its generic name honours Roy Chapman Andrews, the leader of the expedition, with the Ancient Greek archos (ἀρχός, "ruler") added to his surname.

A second species of Andrewsarchus, A. crassum, was named by Ding Suyin and colleagues in 1977 on the basis of IVPP V5101, a pair of teeth (the second and third lower premolars) recovered from the Dongjun Formation of Guangxi.

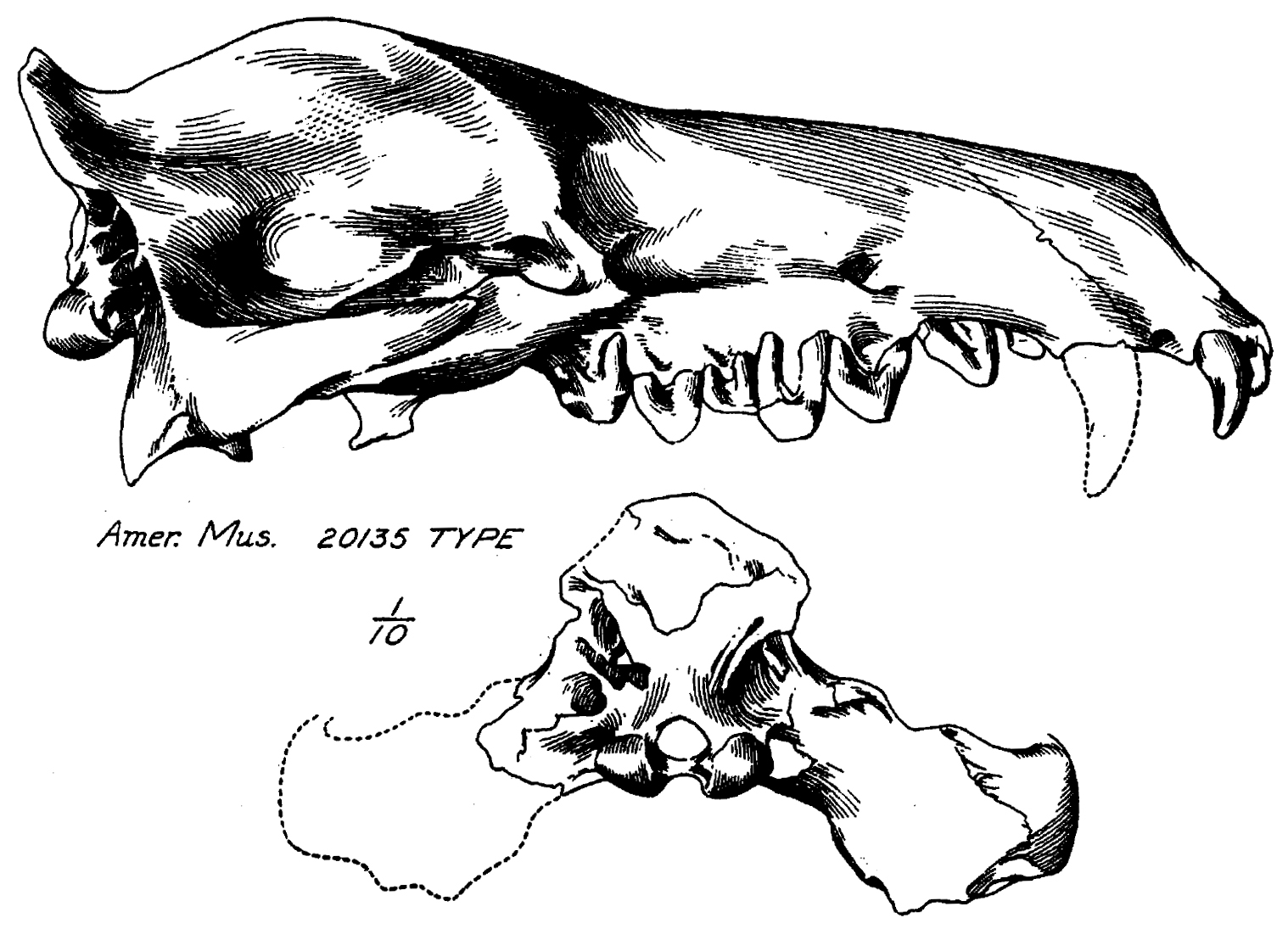
Illustrated holotype skull of A. mongoliensis

In 1957, Zhou Mingzhen and colleagues recovered a mandible, a fragmentary maxilla and several isolated teeth from the Lushi Formation of Henan, China, which correlates to the Irdin Manha Formation. The maxilla belonged to a skull that was crushed beyond recognition; it is likely from the same individual as the mandible. Zhou described it in 1959 as Paratriisodon henanensis, and assigned it to Arctocyonidae. He further classified it as part of the subfamily Triisodontinae (now the family Triisodontidae) based on close similarities of the molars and premolars to those of Triisodon. A second species, P. gigas, was named by Zhou and colleagues in 1973 for a molar also from the Lushi Formation. Three molars and an incisor from the Irdin Manha Formation were later referred to P. gigas. Comparisons between the two genera were drawn as far back as 1969, when Frederick Szalay suggested that they either evolved from the same arctocyonid ancestors or that they were an example of convergent evolution. Paratriisodon was first properly synonymised with Andrewsarchus by Leigh Van Valen in 1978, who did so without explanation. Regardless, their synonymy was upheld by Maureen O'Leary in 1998, based on similarities between the molars and premolars of the two genera and their comparable body sizes.

=== Classification ===
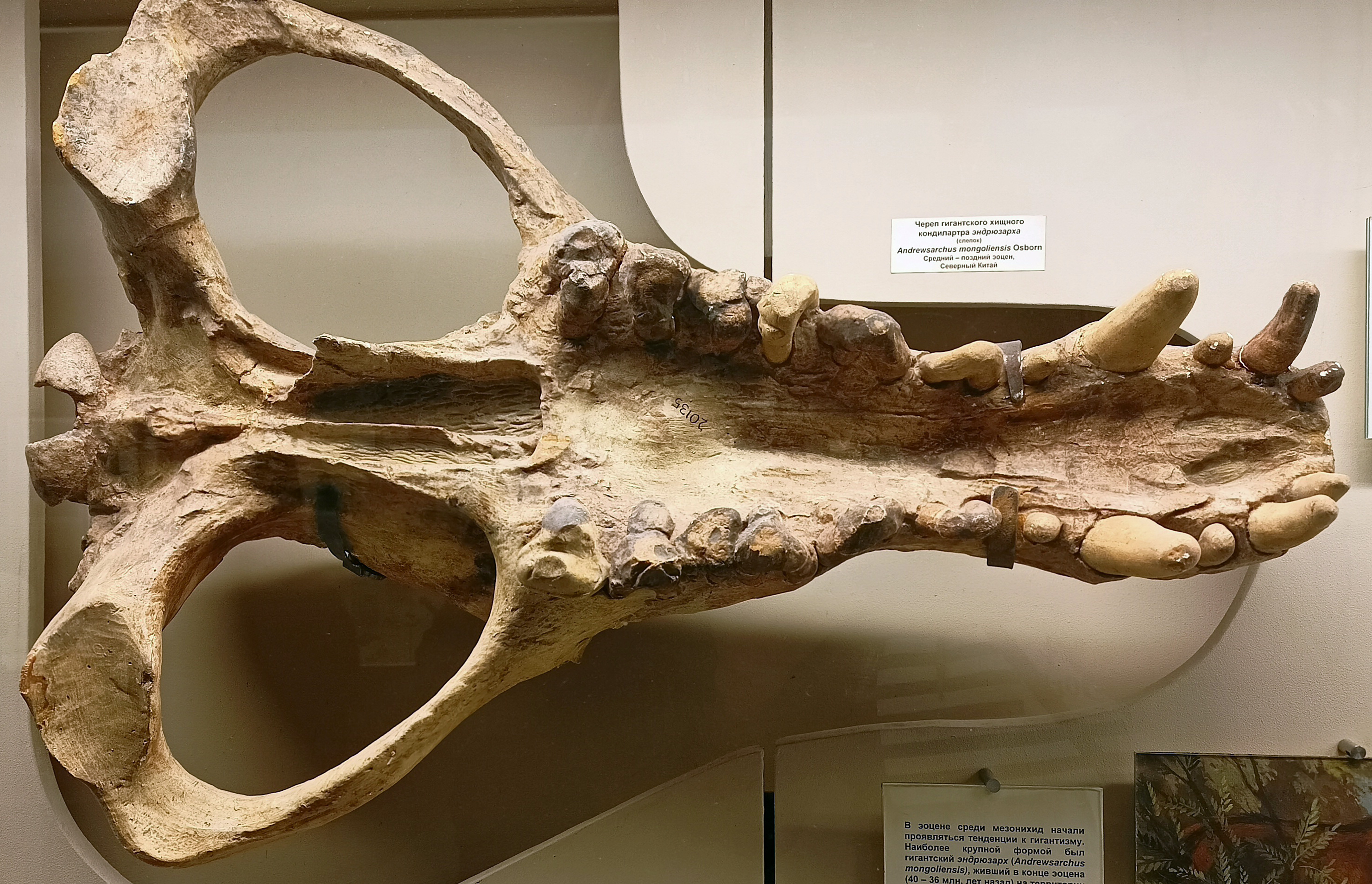
Holotype skull cast of A. mongoliensis as seen from below

Andrewsarchus was initially regarded as a mesonychid, and Paratriisodon as an arctocyonid. In 1995, the former became the sole member of its own subfamily, Andrewsarchinae, within Mesonychia. The subfamily was elevated to family level by Philip D. Gingerich in 1998, who tentatively assigned Paratriisodon to it. In 1988, Donald Prothero and colleagues recovered Andrewsarchus as the sister taxon to whales. It has since been recovered as a more basal member of Cetancodontamorpha, most closely related to entelodonts, hippos and whales. In 2023, Yu and colleagues conducted a phylogenetic analysis of ungulates, with a particular focus on entelodontid artiodactyls. Andrewsarchus was recovered as part of a clade consisting of itself, Achaenodon, Erlianhyus, Protentelodon, Wutuhyus and Entelodontidae. It was found to be most closely related to Achaenodon and Erlianhyus, with which it formed a polytomy. A cladogram based on their phylogeny is reproduced below:

- Artiodactyla
  - Camelidamorpha
  - - Suinamorpha
    - - Ruminantiamorpha
      - Cetancodontamorpha
        - Siamotherium krabiensis
        - - - - Erlianhyus primitivus
              - Andrewsarchus mongoliensis
              - Achaenodon uintensis
            - - Wutuhyus primitivus
              - - Proentelodon
                - Entelodontidae
          - - Hippopotamidamorpha
            - Cetaceamorpha

== Description ==
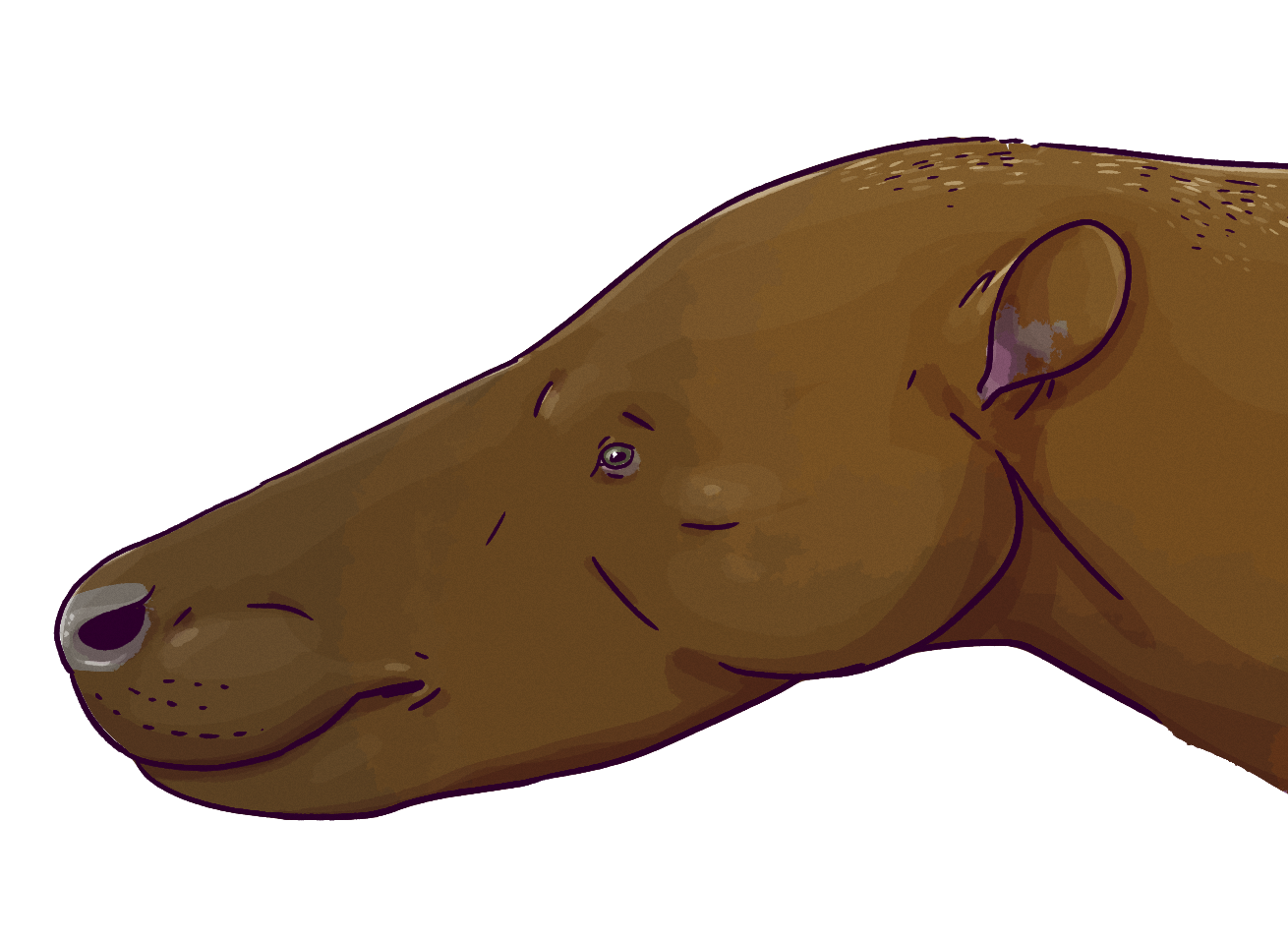
Life restoration of the head of A. mongoliensis

When first describing Andrewsarchus, Osborn believed it to be the largest terrestrial, carnivorous mammal. Based on the length of the A. mongoliensis holotype skull, and using the proportions of Mesonyx, he estimated a total body length of 3.82 m (12.5 ft) and a body height of 1.89 m (6.2 ft). However, considering cranial and dental similarities with entelodonts, Frederick Szalay and Stephen Jay Gould proposed that it had proportions less like mesonychids and more like them, and thus that Osborn's estimates were likely inaccurate.

=== Skull ===
The holotype skull of Andrewsarchus has a total length of 83.4 cm (2.74 ft), and is 56 cm (1.84 ft) wide at the zygomatic arches. The snout is greatly elongated, measuring one-and-a-half times the length of the basicranium, and the portion of the snout in front of the canines resembles that of entelodonts. Unlike entelodonts, however, the postorbital bar is incomplete. The sagittal crest is reduced, and the mandibular fossa is relatively flat. Together, these attributes suggest a weak temporalis muscle and a fairly weak bite force. The hard palate is long and narrow. The mandibular fossa is also offset laterally and ventrally from the basicranium, similar to the condition seen in mesonychids. The mandible itself is long and shallow, characterised by a straight and relatively shallow horizontal ramus. The masseteric fossa, the depression on the mandible to which the masseter attaches, is shallow. Symphyseal contact between the two mandibles is limited.

=== Dentition ===
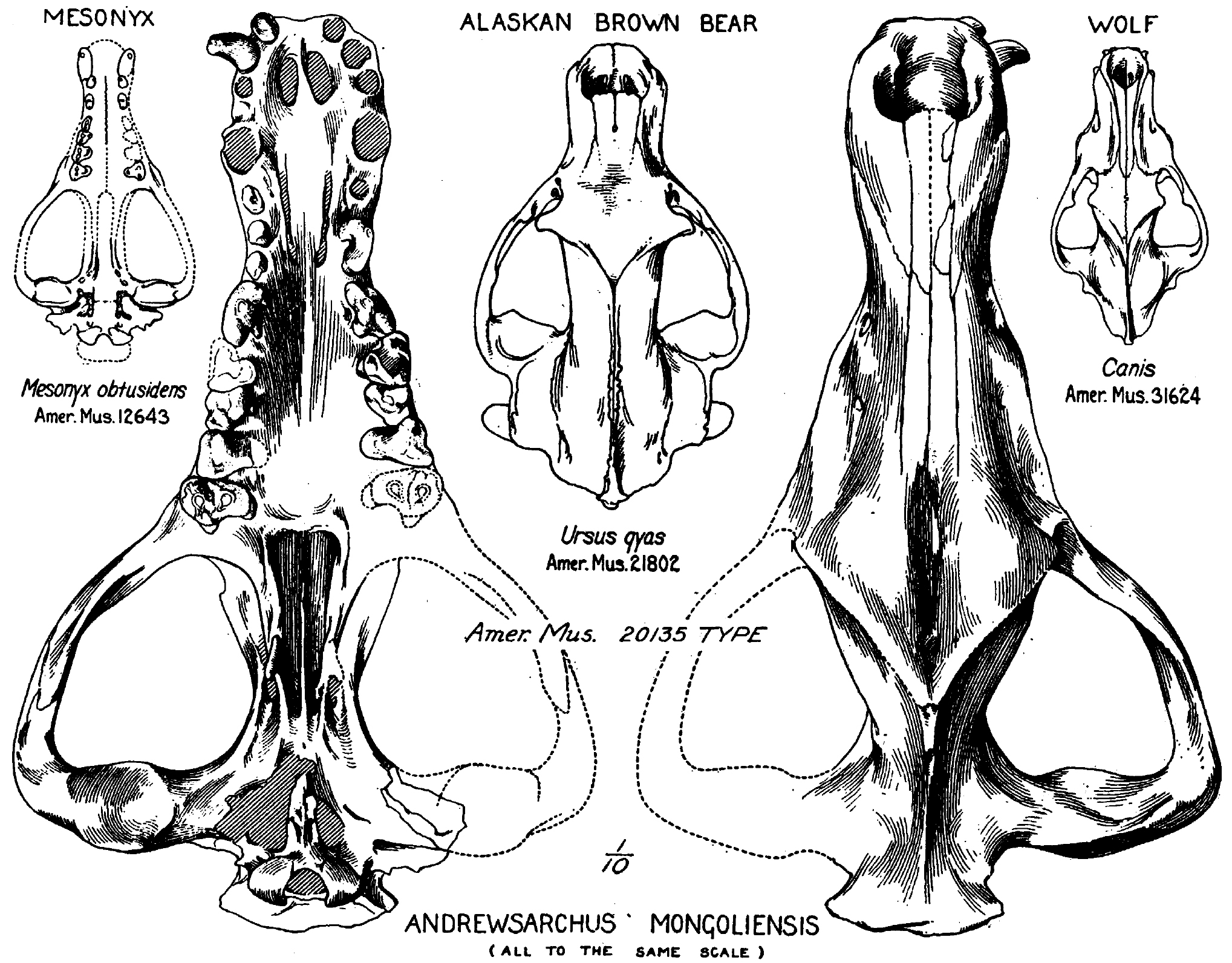
Skull of Andrewsarchus compared to those of Mesonyx, an Alaskan brown bear and a wolf

The holotype cranium of Andrewsarchus demonstrates the typical placental tooth formula, of three incisors, one canine, four premolars and three molars per side, though it is not clear whether the same applies to the mandible. The upper incisors are arranged in a semicircle in front of the canines, a trait that is shared with entelodonts. The second incisor is enlarged, and is almost the size of the canines. This is partly because, while the canines were originally described as being "of enormous size", they are relatively small in proportion to the rest of the dentition. The upper premolars are elongate and consist of a single cusp, resembling those of entelodonts. The fourth premolar retains the protocone, though in a vestigial form. Their roots are not confluent and lack a dentine platform, which are both likely to be adaptations to prolong the tooth's functional life after crown abrasion. The first molar is the smallest. The second is the widest, but has been heavily worn since fossilisation. The third has largely avoided that wear. The premolars and molars have wrinkled crowns, similar to the condition seen in suids and other omnivorous artiodactyls. The tooth structure of the mandible (IVPP V5101) is difficult to determine, as nearly all are worn or broken. All of the right mandible's teeth are preserved save for the first premolar, which is instead preserved on the left mandible. The lower canine and the first premolar both point forwards. The third molar is large, with talonids that have two cusps.

== Diet ==
In his paper describing Andrewsarchus, Osborn suggested that it may have been omnivorous based on comparisons with entelodonts. This conclusion was supported by Szalay and Gould, who use the heavily wrinkled crowns of the molars and premolars as supporting evidence, as well as the close phylogenetic relationship between Andrewsarchus and entelodonts. R. M. Joeckel, in 1990, suggested that it was likely an "omnivore-scavenger", and that it was an ecological analogue to entelodonts. Lars Werdelin further suggested that it was a scavenger, or that it might have preyed on brontotheres.

== Palaeoecology ==
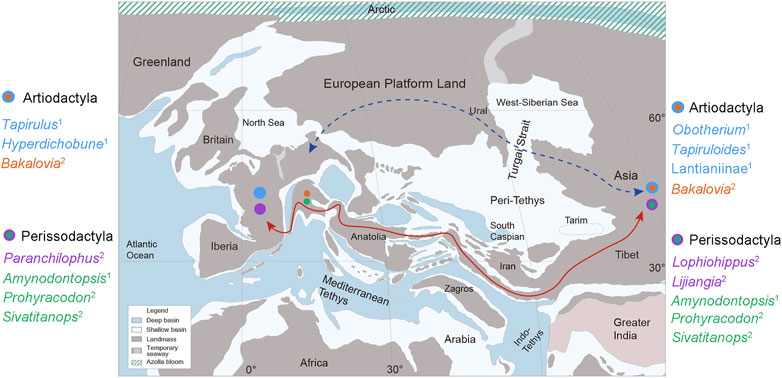
Palaeogeography of Europe and Asia during the Middle Eocene with possible artiodactyl and perissodactyl dispersal routes

For much of the Eocene, a hothouse climate with humid, tropical environments with consistently high precipitation prevailed. Modern mammalian orders including the Perissodactyla, Artiodactyla and Primates (or the suborder Euprimates) appeared already by the Early Eocene, diversifying rapidly and developing dentitions specialized for folivory. The omnivorous forms mostly either switched to folivorous diets or went extinct by the Middle Eocene (Lutetian–Bartonian, 48–38 million years ago) along with the archaic "condylarths". By the Late Eocene (Priabonian, 38–34 million years ago), most of the ungulate form dentitions shifted from bunodont cusps to cutting ridges (i.e. lophs) for folivorous diets.

The Irdin Manha Formation, from which the holotype of Andrewsarchus was recovered, consists of Irdinmanhan strata dated to the Middle Eocene. Andrewsarchus mongoliensis comes from the IM-1 locality, dated to the lower Irdinmanhan, from which the hyaenodontine Propterodon, the mesonychid Harpagolestes, at least three unnamed mesonychids, the artiodactyl Erlianhyus, the perissodactyls Deperetella and Lophialetes, the omomyid Tarkops, the glirian Gomphos, the rodent Tamquammys, and various indeterminate glirians are also known. The Lushi Formation, from which the Paratriisodon henanensis specimen was recovered, was deposited at around the same time as the Irdin Manha Formation. The mesonychid Mesonyx, the pantodont Eudinoceras, the dichobunid Dichobune, the helohyid Gobiohyus, the brontotheres Rhinotitan and Microtitan, the perissodactyls "Amynodon" and Lophialetes, the ctenodactylid Tsinlingomys, and the lagomorph Lushilagus have been identified from the Lushi Formation. The Dongjun Formation, from which A. crassum originates, is similarly Middle Eocene. It preserves the nimravid Eusmilus, the anthracotheriid Probrachyodus, the pantodont Eudinoceras, the brontotheres Metatelmatherium and cf. Protitan, the deperetellids Deperetella and Teleolophus, the paracerathere Forstercooperia, the hyracodonts Ilianodon and Prohyracodon, and the amynodonts "Amynodon", Gigantamynodon and Paramynodon.
