= Cypretherium =

Cypretherium Temporal range: Chadronian

Scientific classification
- Domain: Eukaryota
- Kingdom: Animalia
- Phylum: Chordata
- Class: Mammalia
- Order: Artiodactyla
- Family: †Entelodontidae
- Genus: †Cypretherium; Foss, 2007
- Species: †C. coarctatum

Binomial name
- †Cypretherium coarctatum (Cope, 1889)

Synonyms
- Entelodon coarctatum; Archaeotherium coarctatum

Extinct genus of mammals

Cypretherium coarctatum is an early entelodont from the Chadronian strata of the Cypress Hills Formation in Saskatchewan. First described by Cope in 1889, the holotype is a partial mandibular ramus with p2-m3.

The species is well represented by material from the Hunter Quarry, also in the Cypress Hills Fm. (Russell, 1980b).

The relationship of Cypretherium to other early entelodonts is not well understood at this point.
