= Caijiachong Formation =

Geologic formation in Yunnan, China

- Stratigraphic range: Late Eocene
- Type: Formation
- Overlies: Gelanghe Formation

Location
- Region: Yunnan
- Country: China

The Caijiachong Formation is a geologic formation in Yunnan, southwestern China. The Caijiachong Formation was formerly correlated to the Early Oligocene, but is now considered to date to the Late Eocene, correlated to the Ulangochuian or Ergilian land mammal age.

== Mammal fossils ==
=== Artiodactyls ===
Genus/family	Species	Notes/affinities	Image
Bothriodon	B. chowi	An anthracothere. Fossils initially (and erroneously) assigned to Merycopotamus sp.	
Entelodontellus	E. zhouliangi	An entelodont	
cf. Miomeryx	cf. M. sp.	A ruminant	

=== Perissodactyls ===
Genus/family	Species	Notes/affinities	Image
Brontotheriidae	Brontotheriidae gen. indet.	An unidentified brontothere	
Cadurcodon	C. ardynensis	An amynodont	
Cadurcodon	C. sp.	An amynodont	
Gigantamynodon	G. giganteus	An amynodont	
Gigantamynodon	G. cf. giganteus	An amynodont	
Gigantamynodon	G. sp.	An amynodont	
cf. Metamynodon	cf. M. sp.	An amynodont. The fossils referred to Metamynodon from the Caijachong Formation consist of upper molars. These molars are now considered unlikely to belong to Metamynodon, and are instead likely from the same taxon as Gigantamynodon giganteus.	
Urtinotherium	U. intermedium	A paracerathere	

== Other fossils ==
In addition to mammals, fossils of several other groups are also known from the Caijiachong Formation, including crocodiles, fishes, gastropods, and charophytes.
