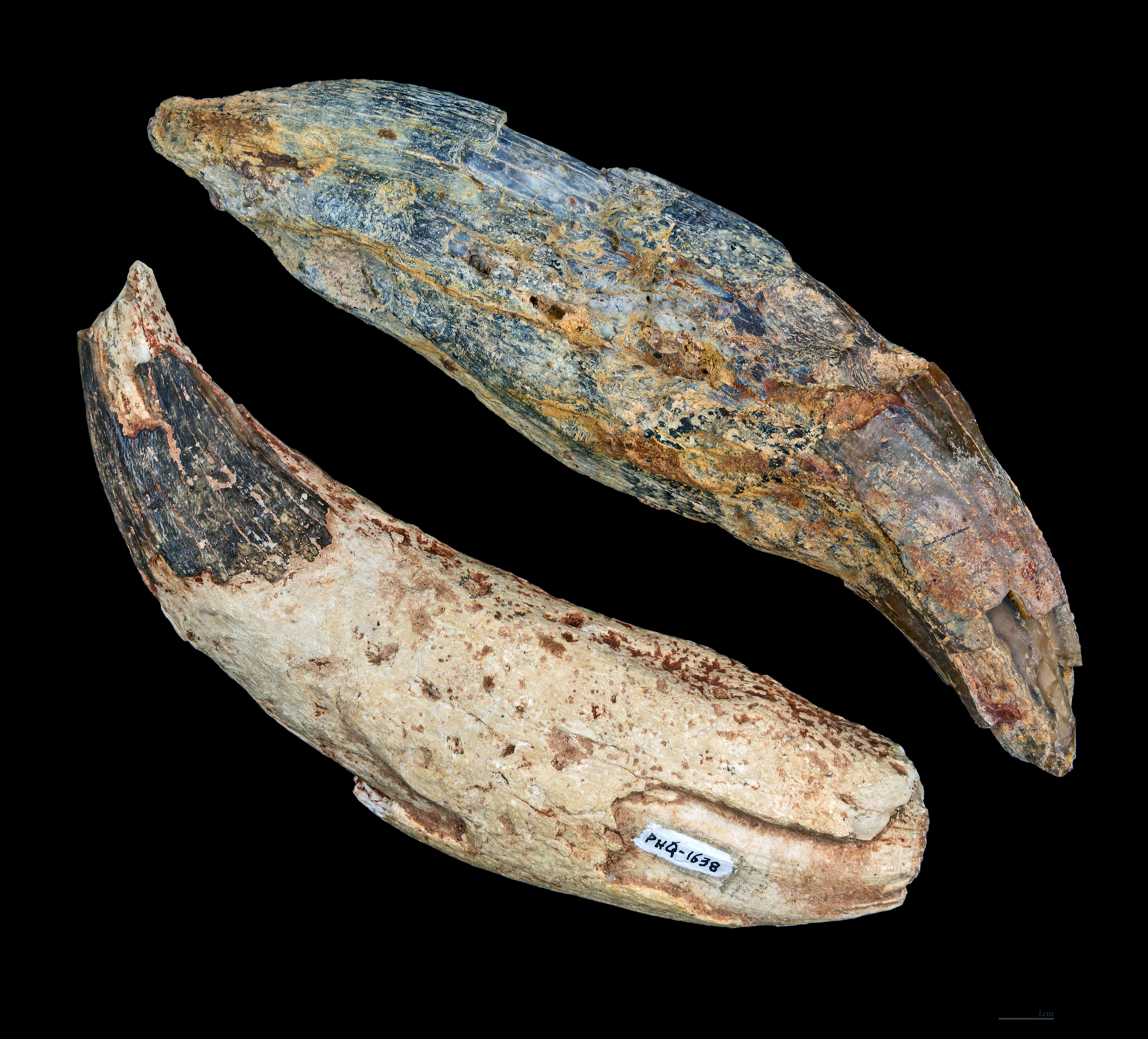
- Two mandibular canines of E. magnus at the MHNT

Scientific classification
- Kingdom: Animalia
- Phylum: Chordata
- Class: Mammalia
- Order: Artiodactyla
- Family: †Entelodontidae
- Genus: †Entelodon; Aymard, 1846

Type species
- †Entelodon magnus Aymard, 1846

Other Species
- †E. antiquus Repelin, 1919; †E. aymardi (Pomel, 1853); †E. deguilhemi Repelin, 1918; †E. dirus Matthew and Granger, 1923; †E. gobiensis (Trofimov, 1952); †E. major (Biriukov, 1961); †E. ronzonii Aymard, 1846; †E. verdeaui (Delfortrie, 1874)

Synonyms
- Elotherium Pommel, 1847

= Entelodon =

Entelodon Temporal range: Late Eocene to Early Oligocene (Priabonian–Rupelian), 37.2–28.4 Ma

Extinct genus of mammals

Entelodon (meaning 'complete teeth', from Ancient Greek ἐντελής entelēs 'complete' and ὀδών odōn 'tooth', referring to its "complete" eutherian dentition), formerly called Elotherium, is an extinct genus of entelodont artiodactyl found in Eurasia. Fossils of species of Entelodon are found in Paleogene strata ranging in age from the Late Eocene to Early Oligocene, from 37.2 to 28.4 Ma.

== Taxonomy ==
E. magnus was the first entelodont, being discovered by French paleontologist Auguste Aymard. Entelodon and Elotherium are almost certainly synonymous, though fossils belonging to the latter name are fragmentary and have been lost, while those of the former were likely described later. Nearly all historical and modern authors prefer to use Entelodon for the purpose of clarity, even though it would not take priority under strict rules of nomenclature. The confusion of priority between Entelodon and Elotherium is reflected in the name of their corresponding family. Edward Richard Alston coined the name Elotheriidae in 1878, while Richard Lydekker used the name Entelodontidae in 1883. As with Entelodon, nearly all paleontologists prefer Entelodontidae when referring to the family.

Entelodonts were an extinct family of artiodactyls that lived from the Middle Eocene to Early Miocene. Initially, entelodonts were considered to have be part of the Suina suborder. However, molecular and morphological analysis have recovered entelodonts as cetancodontamorphs, being more closely related to hippos and cetaceans than to suids.

- - - †Hapalodectes
    - - †Sinonyx
      - †Mesonyx
      - †Harpagolestes uintensis
      - †Dissacus zanabazari
      - - †Dissacus praenuntius
        - - †Harpagolestes orientalis
          - †Pachyaena
  - - †Protungulatum
    - - Perissodactyla
      - Artiodactyla
        - Tylopoda
        - - Suina
          - - Ruminantia
            - - †Entelodontidae
              - - - †Anthracotheriidae
                  - Hippopotamidae
                - - †Raoellidae
                  - Cetacea

Yu et al. (2023) recovered Cetacodontamorpha within two major clades, the "entelodontid clade" and Whippomorpha. The "entelodontid clade" consisted of entelodonts, as well as close relatives such as Andrewsarchus and Proentelodon.

- Cetacodontamorpha
  - Siamotherium
  - - - Hippopotamidamorpha
      - Cetaceamorpha
    - - - Erlianhyus
        - Andrewsarchus
        - Achaenodon
      - - Wutuhyus
        - - Proentelodon
          - Entelodontidae
            - V20124
            - - Brachyhyops viensis
              - - Eoentelodon
                - - Brachyhyops wyomingensis
                  - - Brachyhyops trofimovi
                    - Brachyhyops neimongolensis
                    - Archaeotherium
                    - - Entelodon
                      - Paraentelodon

== Description ==
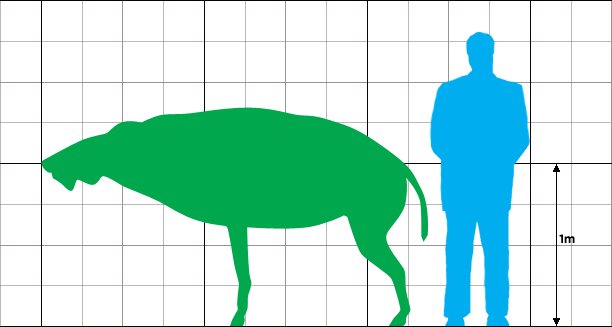
Size comparison between E. deguilhemi and a human

Entelodon was a fairly typical entelodont, with a large, bulky body, slender legs, and a long snout.

Like other entelodonts, Entelodon had complete eutherian dentition (3 incisors, 1 canine, 3 premolars, and 3 molars per quadrant). It had only two toes on each foot, and its legs were built for fast running. Its long, wide head was supported by a robust, short neck, and its cheekbones were greatly enlarged and protruded noticeably from the sides of the head. Though it was more closely related to hippos and whales than pigs, its skull was generally pig-like.

European species of Entelodon were around 1.35 metres (4 ft 5 in) tall at the shoulders, with a 65 centimetres (26 in) skull. Entelodon major, known from the Kutanbulak Formation in Kazakhstan was around 1.70 metres (5 ft 7 in) tall at the shoulders, with an 80 centimetres (31 in) skull, making it one of the largest entelodonts. E. gobiensis was one of the largest entelodonts, estimated to have weighed 630 kilograms (1,390 lb).

== Paleoecology ==
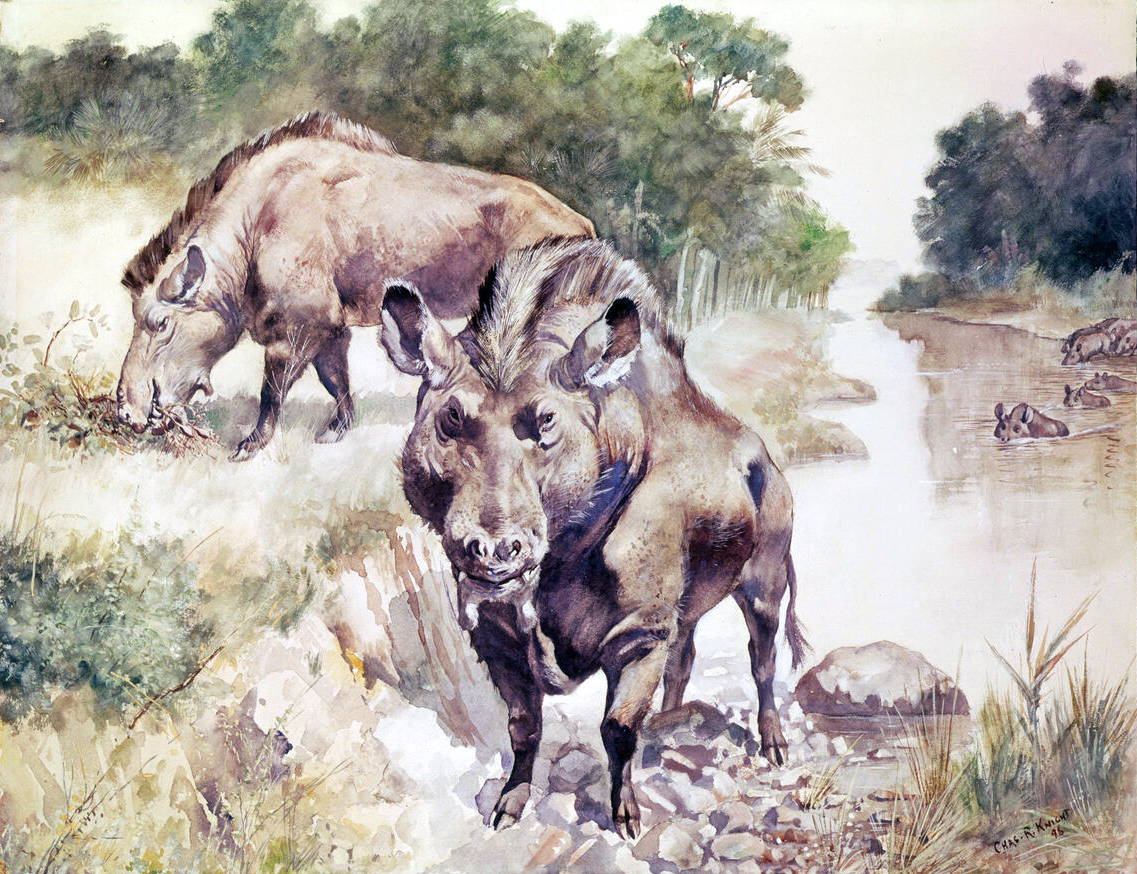
Life restoration by Charles R. Knight, 1896

Based on its dental microwear, the enamel surface of E. magnus had an omnivorous diet comparable to that of the modern wild boar. Much like modern pigs, E. magnus likely did not possess a complex stomach similar to most modern artiodactyls. The same paper also found no overlap with brown bears, suggesting it probably did not actively hunt large mammals as part of its diet, nor did it crush bone like hyenas.

Entelodon remains are primarily known from Europe, although fossils have also been found in Kazakhstan, Mongolia, China, and even as far east as Japan.

Entelodon magnus populated a broad swath of Europe, with remains found in Spain, Germany, France, Romania, and the Caucasus. Extensive remains of Entelodon deguilhemi were uncovered in Vayres-sur-Essonne, France. The Chinese Entelodon dirus is known from a single tooth discovered in Inner Mongolia.
