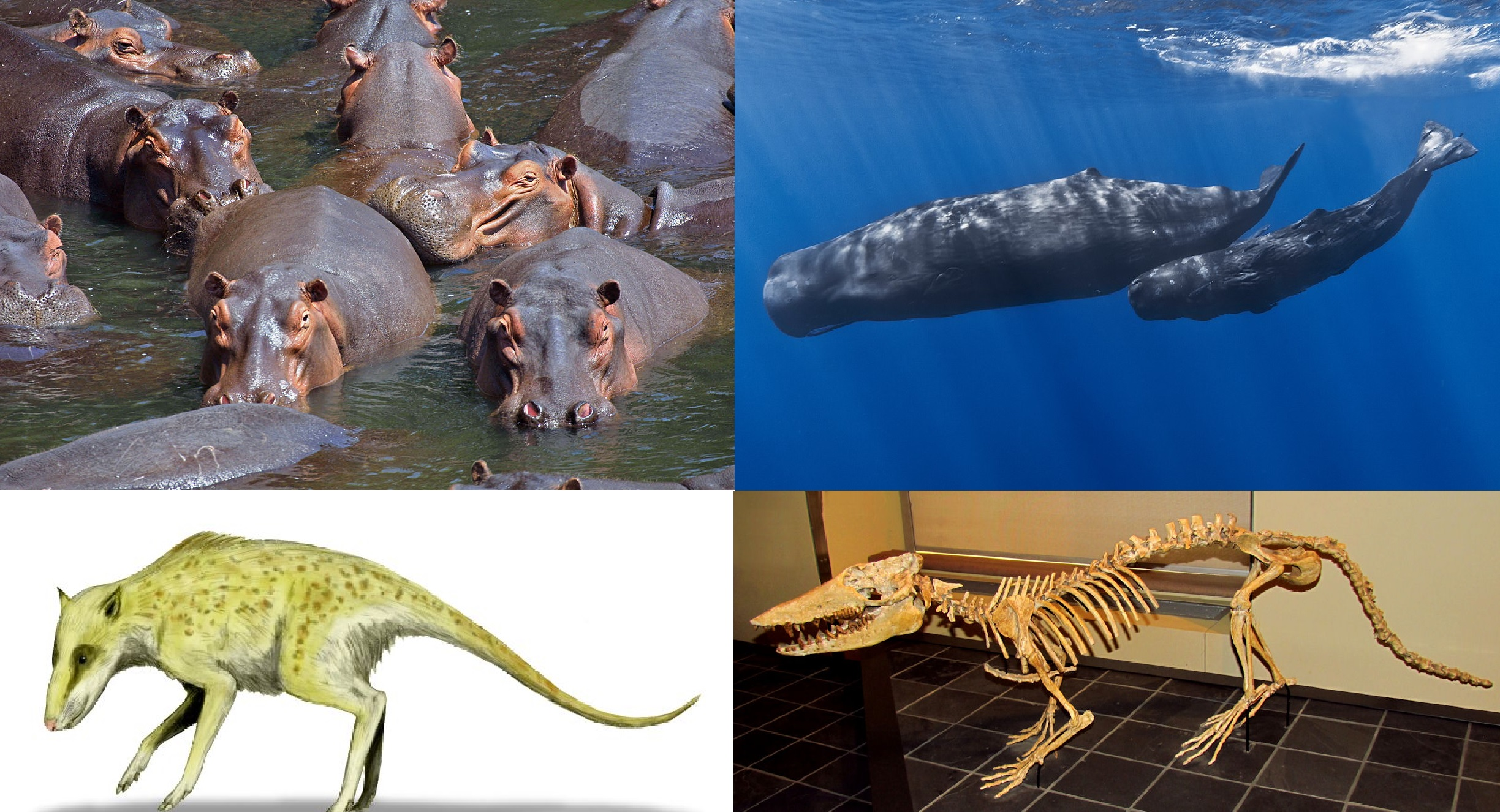
- various Whippomorpha
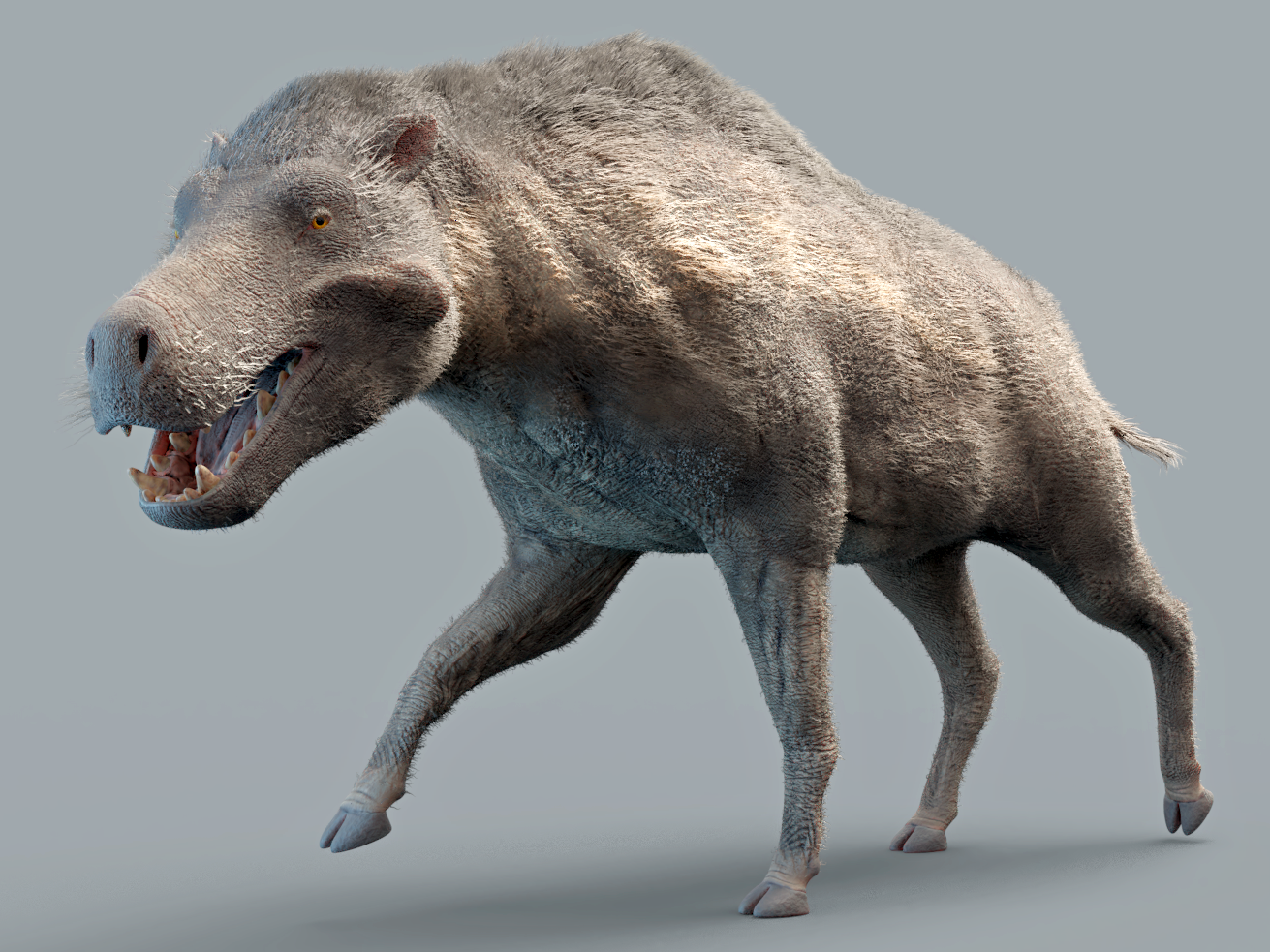
- Restoration of Daeodon

Scientific classification
- Kingdom: Animalia
- Phylum: Chordata
- Class: Mammalia
- Order: Artiodactyla
- Clade: Cetruminantia
- Clade: Cetancodontamorpha; Spaulding et al., 2009

Subgroups
- †Andrewsarchus; †Cebochoeridae?; †Diacodexeidae?; †Dichobunidae?; †Entelodontidae; †Erlianhyus; †Helohyidae; †Proentelodon; †Siamotherium; †Wutuhyus; Whippomorpha

= Cetancodontamorpha =

Cetancodontamorpha Temporal range: Early Eocene to Holocene, 53.5–0 Ma

Clade of tetrapods

Cetancodontamorpha is a total clade of artiodactyls defined, according to Spaulding et al., as Whippomorpha "plus all extinct taxa more closely related to extant members of Whippomorpha than to any other living species".

Whippomorpha is the crown clade containing Cetacea (whales, dolphins, etc.) and hippopotamuses. The "entelodontid clade", which consists of Entelodontidae and close relatives such as Achaenodon and Andrewsarchus, was recovered as a sister clade to Whippomorpha

- Cetacodontamorpha
  - Siamotherium
  - - - Hippopotamidamorpha
      - Cetaceamorpha
    - - - Erlianhyus
        - Andrewsarchus
        - Achaenodon
      - - Wutuhyus
        - - Proentelodon
          - Entelodontidae
            - V20124
            - - Brachyhyops viensis
              - - Eoentelodon
                - - Brachyhyops wyomingensis
                  - - Brachyhyops trofimovi
                    - Brachyhyops neimongolensis
                    - Archaeotherium
                    - - Entelodon
                      - Paraentelodon
