= Entelodontellus =

Entelodontellus Temporal range: Priabonian

Scientific classification
- Kingdom: Animalia
- Phylum: Chordata
- Class: Mammalia
- Order: Artiodactyla
- Family: †Entelodontidae
- Genus: †Entelodontellus
- Species: †E. zhouliangi

Binomial name
- †Entelodontellus zhouliangi Yu et al., 2023

Extinct genus of mammals

Entelodontellus is an extinct genus of entelodontid that lived during the Priabonian stage of the Eocene epoch.

== Distribution ==
Entelodontellus zhouliangi fossils are known from the Caijiachong Formation of Yunnan, China.
