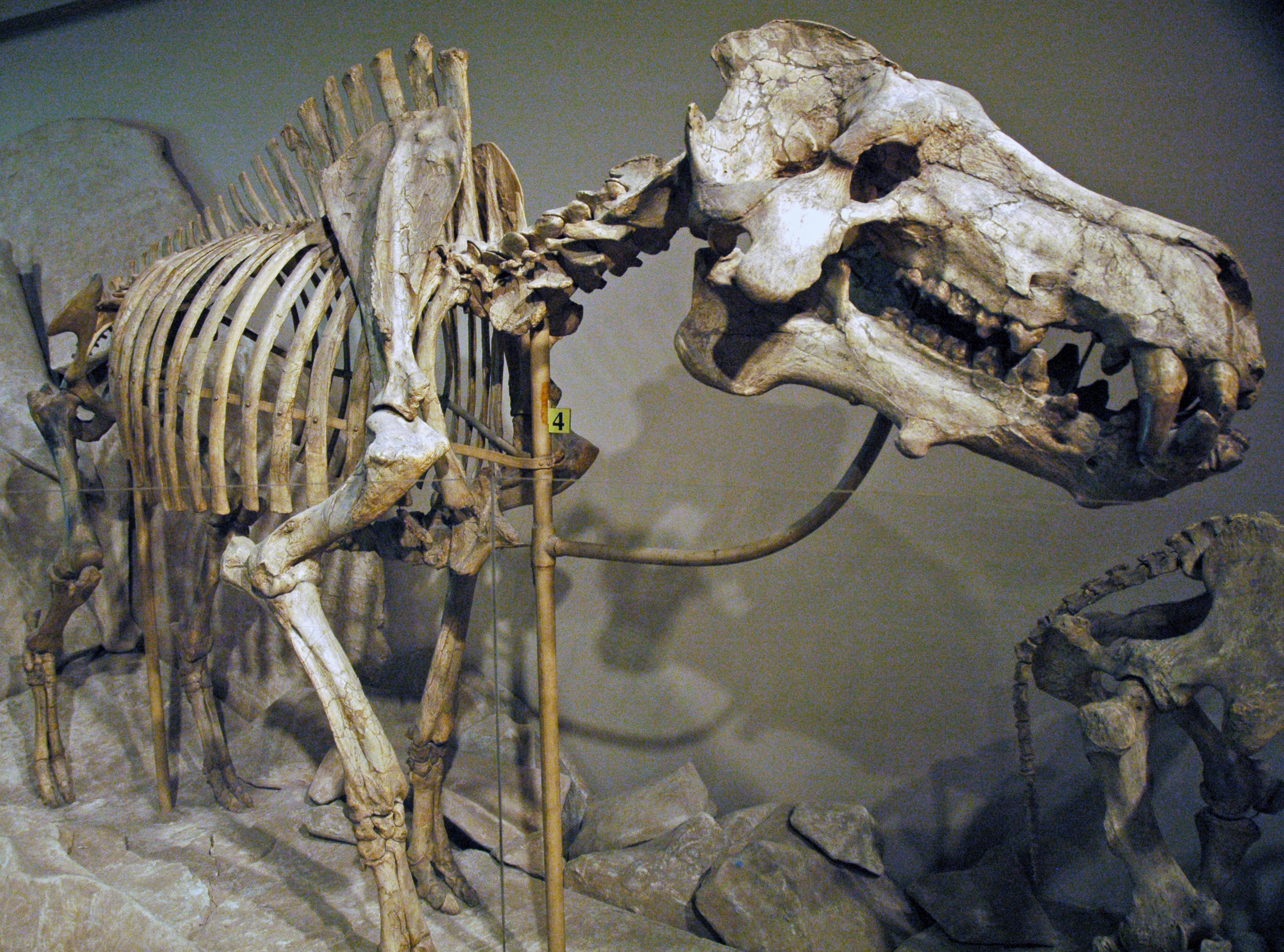
- Complete skeleton of Daeodon

Scientific classification
- Kingdom: Animalia
- Phylum: Chordata
- Class: Mammalia
- Order: Artiodactyla
- Clade: Cetancodontamorpha
- Family: †Entelodontidae; Lydekker, 1883

Type genus
- †Entelodon Aymard, 1846

Genera
- †Archaeotherium; †Brachyhyops; †Cypretherium; †Daeodon; †Entelodon; †Entelodontellus; †Paraentelodon

Synonyms
- Elotheridae Alston, 1878

= Entelodontidae =

Entelodontidae Temporal range: Middle Eocene–Early Miocene 45–19 Ma

Extinct family of ungulates

Entelodontidae is an extinct family of pig-like artiodactyls (even-toed ungulates) that inhabited the Northern Hemisphere (Eurasia and North America) from the Middle Eocene to the Early Miocene epochs, about 45 to 19 million years ago. Their large heads, low snouts, narrow gait, and proposed omnivorous diets inspire comparisons to suids (true pigs) and tayassuids (peccaries), and historically they have been considered closely related to these families purely on a morphological basis. However, studies which combine morphological and molecular (genetic) data on artiodactyls instead suggest that entelodonts are cetancodontamorphs, more closely related to hippopotamuses and cetaceans through their resemblance to Pakicetus, than to basal pigs such as Kubanochoerus and other ungulates.

== Classification ==
=== Early history ===
The earliest entelodont fossils to be named were described within a short time in the 1840s. The first entelodont species known from good fossils was Entelodon magnus, a European species that was named by French paleontologist Auguste Aymard. Some debate exists over when Aymard's description was first published; though most authors assumed it was written in 1846, a citation within the article suggests that it was not published until 1848. Auguste Pomel, one of Aymard's contemporaries, described another fossil as Elotherium around the same time. Pomel's volume was likely published in 1846 or 1847, albeit with surviving reprints dating to 1848. Entelodon and Elotherium are almost certainly synonymous, though fossils belonging to the latter name are fragmentary and have been lost, while those of the former were likely described later. Nearly all historical and modern authors prefer to use Entelodon for the purpose of clarity, though it would not take priority under strict rules of nomenclature. The confusion of priority between Entelodon and Elotherium is reflected in the name of their corresponding family. Edward Richard Alston coined the name Elotheriidae in 1878, while Richard Lydekker used the name Entelodontidae in 1883. As with Entelodon, nearly all paleontologists prefer Entelodontidae when referring to the family.

Following the confusion between Entelodon and Elotherium, entelodont fossils continued to be discovered in Europe. Large entelodonts were also described from North America starting in 1850, though most new genera were eventually lumped into Archaeotherium and Daeodon. By the beginning of the 20th century, entelodont skeletal anatomy was well understood from the quantity of fossils discovered by that point. In 1909, a massive complete skeleton of "Dinohyus" hollandi (= Daeodon), CM 1594, was described and put on display at the Carnegie Museum of Natural History. As the 20th century continued, Asian entelodonts were discovered (Eoentelodon, Paraentelodon), as well as some of the earliest known members of the family (Eoentelodon, Brachyhyops).

=== Traditional classification ===
The first described entelodonts were described in conjunction with Richard Owen's recognition of the artiodactyls as a natural group. The earliest sources considered entelodonts to be true pigs, but as further fossils were discovered, their long evolutionary history separate from pigs became clear. Regardless, entelodonts were universally accepted as examples of "primitive" artiodactyls, with unspecialized bunodont teeth in contrast with the strong adaptations for herbivory present in the more "advanced" ruminants. Various names were erected to encompass living and extinct bunodont-toothed and nonruminant artiodactyls, such as "Omnivoria" (Owens, 1858), "Bunodontia" (Lydekker, 1883), and "Nonruminantia" (Gregory, 1910).

Some authors considered entelodonts to be too "primitive" for comparison to modern bunodont artiodactyls. In these studies, entelodonts were placed in "Palaeodonta", a group shared with various other extinct families. Choeropotamids, cebochoerids, and helohyids were frequently associated with entelodonts, sometimes even as potential ancestors. Later, the superfamily Entelodontoidea was named to encompass Entelodontidae and their supposed closest extinct relatives. In modern studies, Entelodontidae is generally considered the only family within the Entelodontoidea.

Many studies argued that entelodonts had close relations to living pigs, peccaries, and hippos. Various groups have been developed and named in reference to a pig-like anatomy, with names such as Suina (Gray, 1868) and Suiformes (Jaeckel, 1911) being emplaced in varying contexts. A restricted definition of Suina is still in use, as a major artiodactyl suborder encompassing Tayassuidae (peccaries) and Suidae (pigs). Early cladistic phylogenetic analyses of artiodactyls placed Entelodontidae as the sister taxon to a Tayassuidae + Suidae clade. This seemed to justify the frequent morphological comparisons between entelodonts and pigs. Proentelodon was described in 2008 and was considered to have been the oldest known entelodont.

=== Cetancodontomorpha ===
While entelodonts have long been classified as members of the Suina, Spaulding et al. have found them to be closer to whales and hippos than to pigs. Cladistic analysis of the position of whales in relation to artiodactyls and mesonychians changes radically depending on whether the giant enigmatic mammal Andrewsarchus is included, and Andrewsarchus has been suggested to be, in fact, an entelodont or close relative. Many former genera of entelodonts have been synonymized. For example, some authors have synonymized Dinohyus with Daeodon shoshonensis, a species described from fragmentary material by Cope.

Many experts have also questioned the placement of Proentelodon within entelodonts, as it had a large and elongated hypoconulid on m3, a cusp which was absent in entelodonts. Cladistic analysis by Yu et al. (2023) recovered it as a sister taxon to the family.

- Cetacodontamorpha
  - †Siamotherium
  - - - Hippopotamidamorpha
      - Cetaceamorpha
    - - - †Erlianhyus
        - †Andrewsarchus
        - †Achaenodon
      - - †Wutuhyus
        - - †Proentelodon
          - †Entelodontidae
            - Entelodontellus
            - - Brachyhyops viensis
              - - Eoentelodon
                - - Brachyhyops wyomingensis
                  - - Brachyhyops trofimovi
                    - Brachyhyops neimongolensis
                    - Archaeotherium
                    - - Entelodon
                      - Paraentelodon

== Description ==
Entelodonts could get quite large and in many cases are the largest mammals in their respective ecosystems. The largest entelodont known from a complete skeleton was Daeodon, a North American entelodont that could reach an estimated weight of 750 kg (1,650 lb), and a height up to 1.9 m (6.2 ft) tall at the shoulder. Paraentelodon intermedium, a Eurasian species known mostly by the teeth and jaws, was similar in size to Daeodon.

=== Skull ===
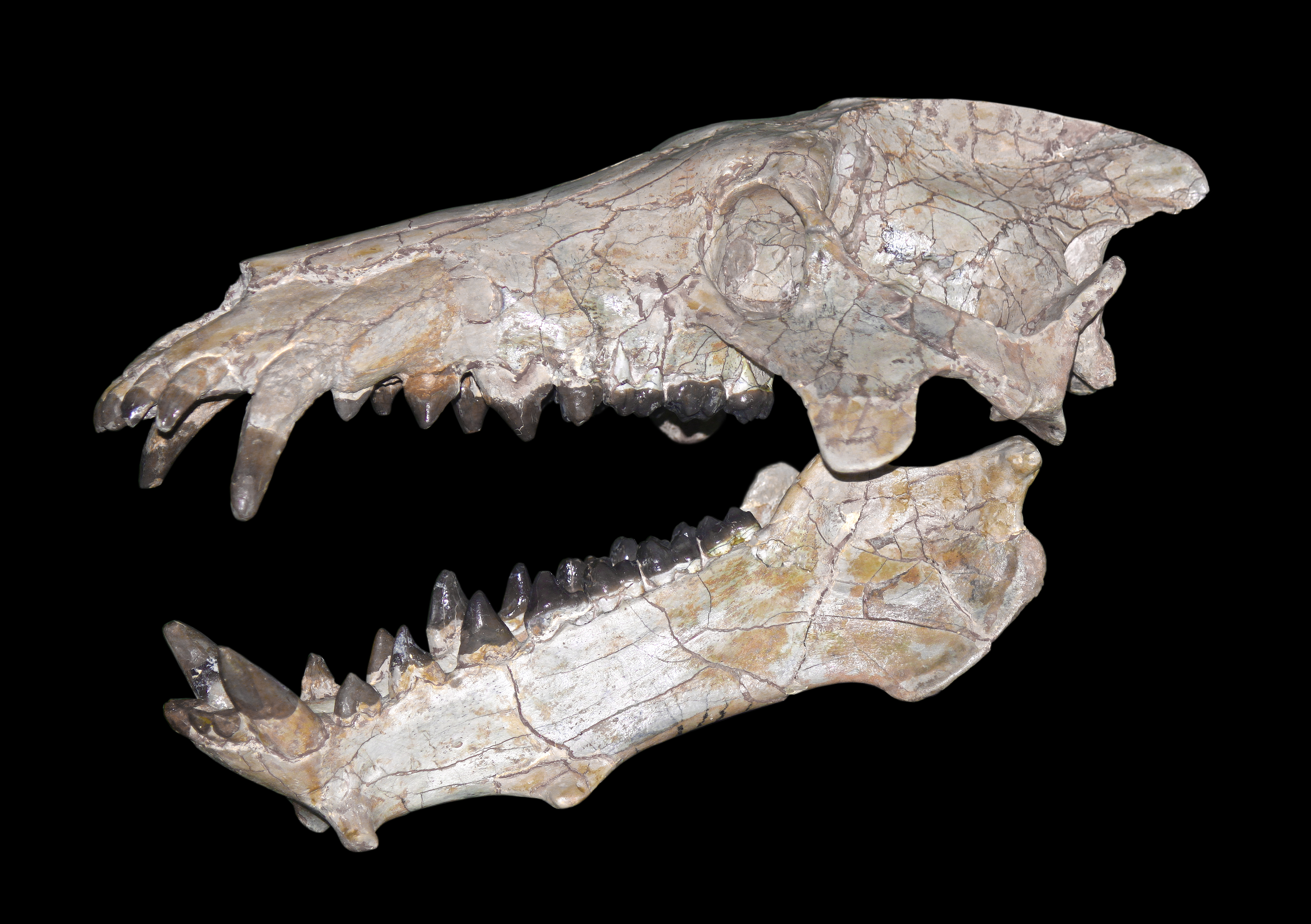
Skull of Archaeotherium mortoni

Entelodonts had huge heads, ornamented with distinctive bony expansions. The zygomatic arches (cheekbones) develop huge jugal flanges, which project downwards and outwards. Moreover, the underside of the lower jaw typically has one or two pairs of knob-like mandibular tubercles. These are not always diagnostic to specific taxa; often, the size and presence of tubercles is variable within a single species.

The snout was narrow and elongated, especially in later species. The cranium was robust, with strong zygomatic and postorbital arches forming the rim of voluminous temporal fossae, separated by a sharp sagittal crest. However, the rear of the skull was also much shorter than the snout, and the braincase was relatively small. Most of the braincase contributed to large paranasal sinuses and olfactory bulbs at the front, while the cerebrum was underdeveloped. Large olfactory bulbs are likely indicative of a good sense of smell. Moreover, the orbits (eye sockets) are oriented further forwards than in most artiodactyls, suggesting that entelodonts had binocular vision. Compared to other artiodactyls, the jaw was slender at the rear, with a short, triangular coronoid process, which is shifted forward. The mandibular condyle (jaw joint) is set back and below the level of the tooth row. The mandibular symphysis (chin) was fused, and the pterygoid bones along the middle of the roof of the mouth were connected by a strong interdigitating suture.

=== Teeth ===
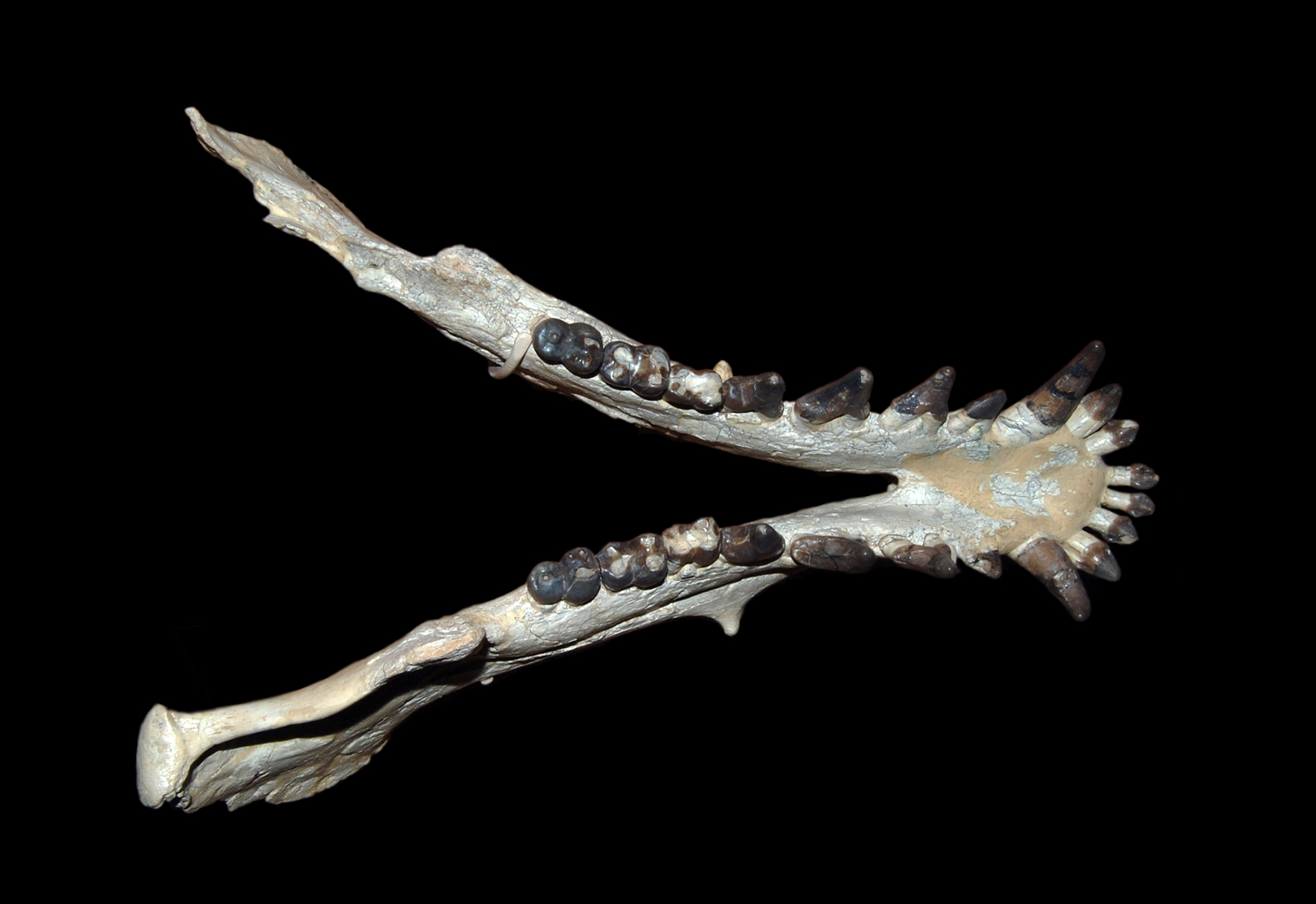
Lower jaw of Archaeotherium, showing the array of teeth

Similar to pigs, entelodonts retain a large number of teeth, a plesiomorphic trait approximating the ancestral condition for artiodactyls. They have a typical mammalian dental formula of 3.1.4.3 / 3.1.4.3, meaning that each tooth row has three pairs of robust incisors, a pair of large canines, four pairs of pointed premolars, and three pairs of relatively simple and flat molars. This unreduced, or "complete" dentition is the origin of the family's name, which is Greek for "complete teeth".

The incisors are closely packed, but do not develop a distinct, straight chopping surface. They range from chisel-shaped in some entelodonts (Archaeotherium) to massive and rounded in others (Daeodon). The canines have thick enamel and are circular in cross-section, unlike most artiodactyls. In older individuals, the tips of the upper canines are often heavily worn or even chipped off. Premolars are triangular when seen from the side, with a large and conical main cusp. They are elongated from front-to-back and widely spaced, taking up a large portion of the tooth row. The molar teeth are bunodont, with very low and rounded cusps rather than shearing surfaces. Bunodont teeth are common in other omnivorous mammals, including pigs, bears, and humans. The upper molars have up to six cusps and a low crest (a precingulum) on the front edge of the crown. In all but the earliest entelodonts, the lower molars have only four main cusps. The front two cusps (the metaconid and protoconid) may be connected by a horizontal crest and are slightly larger than the rear two cusps.

=== Postcranial skeleton ===
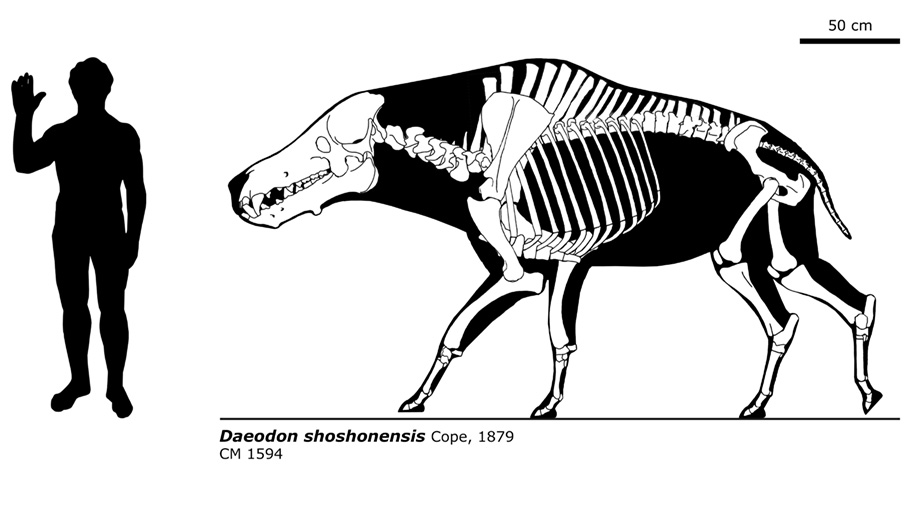
Daeodon skeletal reconstruction and size diagram

The skeleton is fairly unspecialized in entelodonts. They retain typical artiodactyl skeletal traits, such as a double-pulley ankle joint and paraxonic ("even-toed") feet with weight split evenly between the two middle toes. They had four toes on each foot, with the middle two forming small, pointed, cloven hooves, while the remaining two were vestigial and likely not externally visible. In larger species, a bison-like spinal hump supported the weight of the heavy head. The limbs were long, and the radii and ulnae were fused. Though not fused, the metatarsals (raised foot bones) were long and closely packed. The limb and hoof proportions are consistent with other hoofed animals that run well on open ground, but are not built for high speed.

== Paleobiology ==
=== Jaw movement and musculature ===
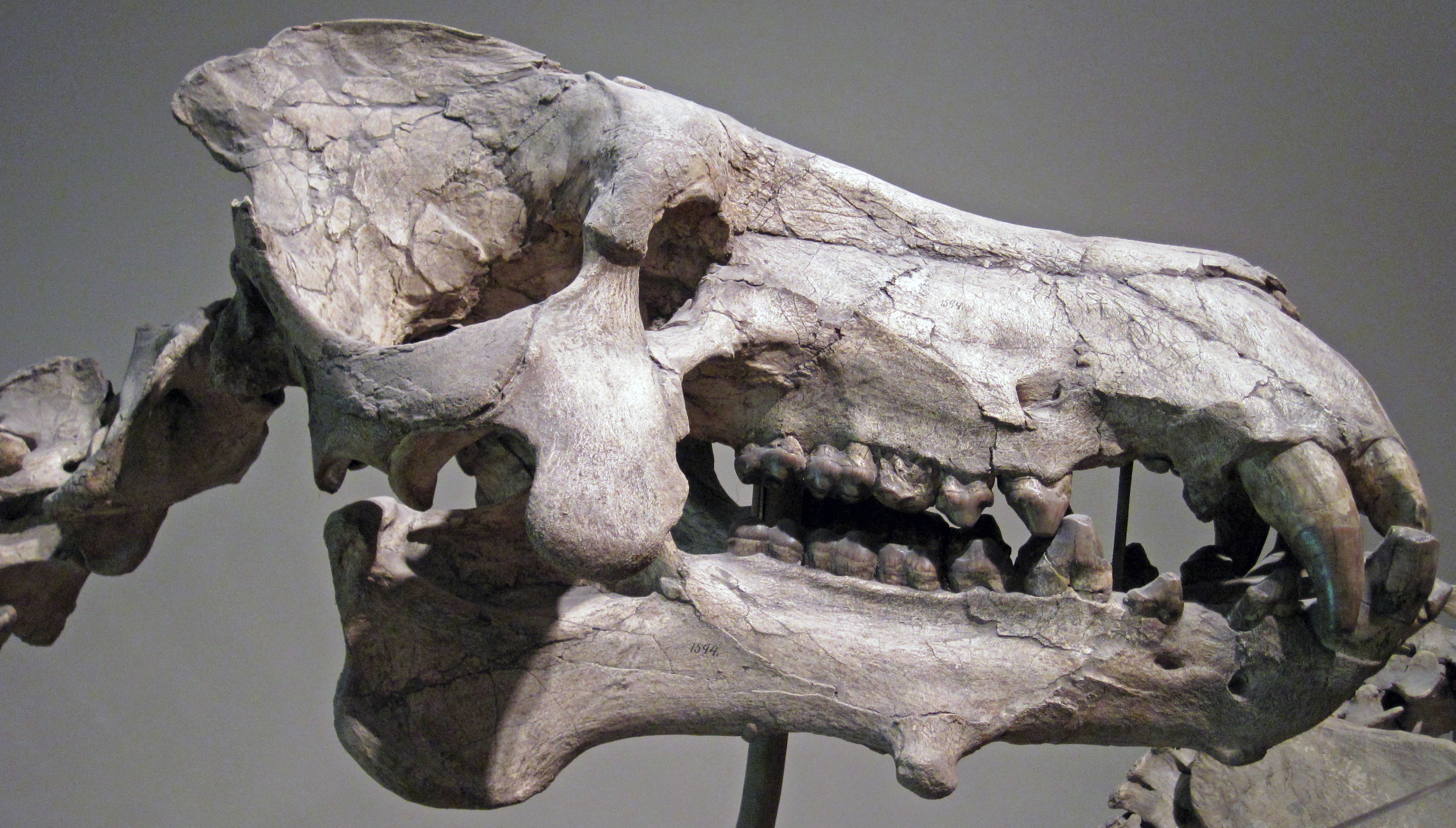
Skull of Daeodon

The wide and tall temporal fossa allowed for a very large m. temporalis, which extends from the side of the cranium to the coronoid process of the mandible. The m. temporalis was not only large and strong, but also had a long moment arm (and thus higher torque) due to the coronoid process shifting forwards. The reinforced pterygoid, zygomatic, and postorbital areas would have supported the forces generated by the muscle; its size and orientation are similar to carnivorans, where it corresponds to a strong and stable scissor-like (orthal) bite.

Though the low jaw joint provided more room for the m. temporalis, it also posed a problem for the m. masseter, which extends from the zygomatic arch to the lower rear corner of the mandible and is a major component of the chewing apparatus in herbivorous artiodactyls. While other artiodactyls added torque to the muscle by raising the jaw joint, entelodonts instead expanded the rear of the jaw downwards, as a deep, curved flange. Moreover, the characteristic jugal flanges of entelodonts were covered with muscle scars on the inside, likely attachment points to strengthen the m. masseter. Only a few modern mammals have overdeveloped projections on the zygomatic arch, including xenarthrans, kangaroos, and certain rodents. Like entelodonts, these mammals use their equivalent projections as a means of providing extra space for the attachment of the m. masseter and develop robust cranial bars to resist the resulting forces on the skull. The m. pterygoideus, which follows a similar path and function to the m. masseter, also benefited from the deep flange at the back of the jaw.

The function of the mandibular tubercles is not certain, but they may also be related to jaw musculature. They are only clearly correlated with the size of the individual, though a few taxa (Brachyhyops and Cypretherium) can be diagnosed by the absence of a specific pair of mandibular tubercles. Generally, the posterior (rear) mandibular tubercles develop later in life than the anterior (front) pair, and none of the tubercles stop growing as the animal develops. The use of the anterior tubercles is unclear; one speculative idea suggests that they served as an attachment point for strong lip muscles in particularly herbivorous entelodonts. The posterior tubercles may provide a link to the m. digastricus, which helps to open the jaws. Hippos, which have a particularly complex and well-developed m. digastricus, occasionally develop a tubercle to support that muscle in an equivalent area on the jaw.

The jaw joint of entelodonts was likely more strongly connected than the loose jaws of most other artiodactyls. The mandibular condyle was convex and inserted into a strongly concave facet (glenoid) on the zygomatic arch, which would have restricted front-to-back (propalinal) jaw movement. Nevertheless, the structure of the mandibular condyle itself allowed for a wide range of movement, and the laterally bowed zygomatic arch provided some room for side-to-side (transverse) movement driven by the m. masseter and m. pterygoideus. The low, unconstrained jaw joint and short coronoid process may correspond to long muscle fibers. This points to a hinge-like jaw suspension with a very wide gape, similar to some modern carnivorans such as felids. Based on the shape of the mandibular condyle, the maximum gape possible based on the underlying bones (though not necessarily the widest gape possible in life) was about 109° in Archaeotherium.

Wear facets on entelodont teeth support three-part food processing. First, the incisors and canines bite in a strong orthal motion, grabbing and puncturing food. Then, the food is transferred back to the premolars, which break apart tough parts of the food with similar movements. Finally, the food is crushed and ground up by the molars, using a combination of orthal and transverse grinding. This same basic process is seen in modern pigs and peccaries, which have similar dentition. Individuals may have preferred one side of the jaw for chewing, as premolars and molars often show an asymmetrical distribution of wear between the left and right sides of the mouth.

=== Diet ===
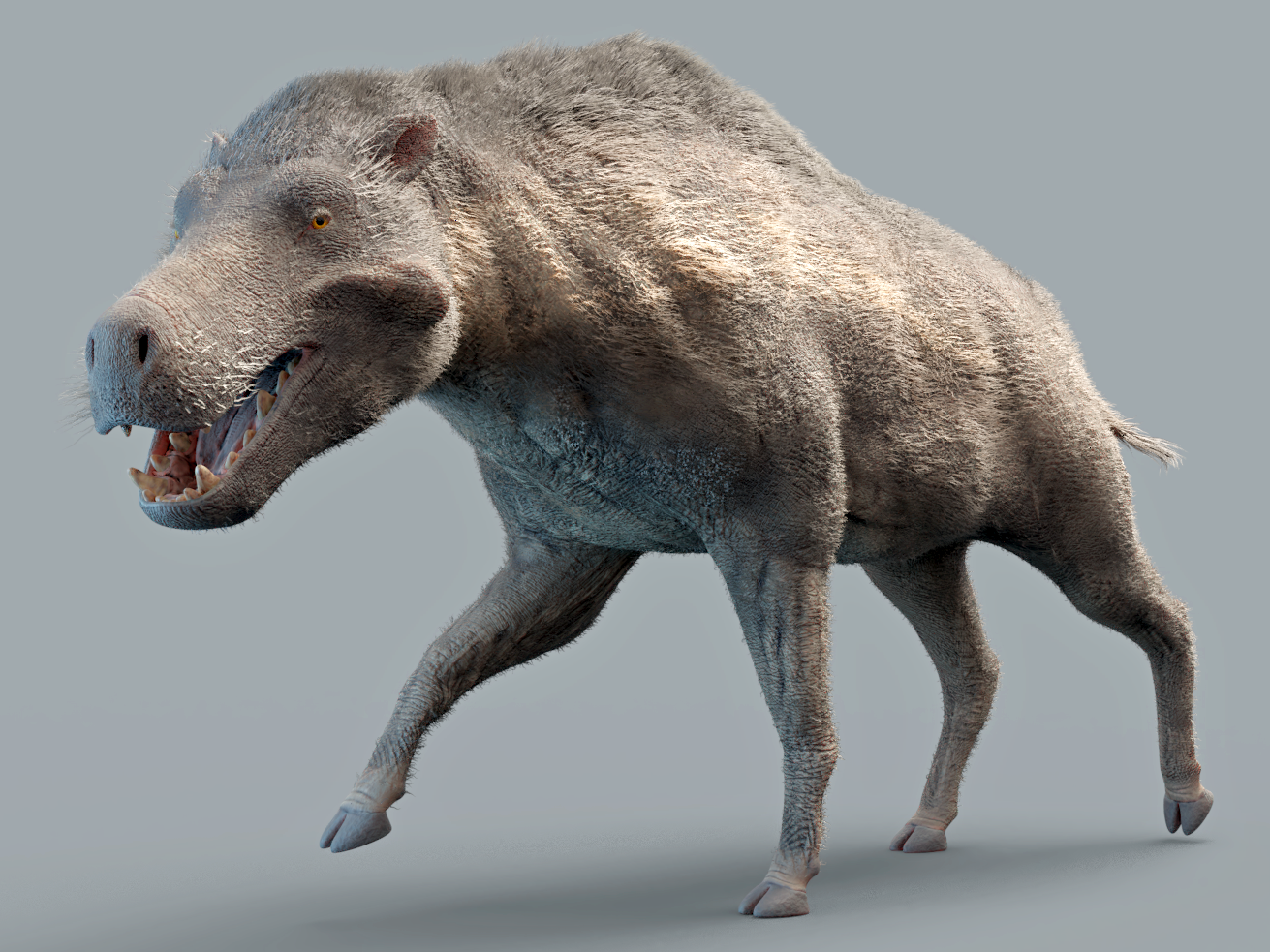
Life restoration of Daeodon

By comparison to pigs and peccaries, entelodonts were almost certainly omnivorous to an extent. Their teeth and jaw structure would have assisted processing of large and tough food items. Unlike the diverse and fully herbivorous pecoran artiodactyls, entelodonts lack specializations for chopping and shredding grass and other particularly fibrous plants. Instead, entelodonts were probably browsers, with roots, nuts, fruits, and branches as their preferred sources of vegetation. A 2022 study found that Entelodon magnus had an omnivorous diet similar to wild boar (Sus scrofa). This conclusion was justified by its pattern of tooth microwear, run through a linear discriminant analysis calibrated by modern herbivorous and omnivorous mammals. Based on pigs, entelodonts probably had a simple stomach and relied on the caecum to ferment and digest plant matter. They would have been opportunistic omnivores, capable of digesting a variety of plant and animal matter and moderating their food preferences based on seasonal ability.

The same adaptations useful for processing tough plant material would be equally useful for carrion and bones, which could have been major components of the diet for some entelodonts. Unlike pigs, the youngest juvenile entelodonts had a full set of 32 deciduous teeth. The teeth were sharp, slender, and semi-serrated, less suitable for crushing tough food compared to adult entelodonts.

In many entelodonts, the canine teeth acquire rounded wear surfaces at their tips, indicating regular use on hard material, such as bones. Similar patterns of canine wear are observed in modern cats, which rely on strong bites administered through their canine teeth when killing prey. In some species, the bases of the canines are scoured by smooth grooves, a trait consistent with abrasions from sediment-covered plant material, such as roots. Alternatively, these grooves could have been produced by stripping long, fibrous vegetation, such as water-rich grape vines. Daeodon teeth had a distinctive type of "piecrust" tooth wear at the tips of the premolars, with a flat dentine surface surrounded by chipped enamel. This type of wear is associated with cracking bones for marrow, as seen in living spotted hyenas. Few contemporary mammals approached entelodonts in the extent of adaptations consistent with scavenging. Fossils with large scrapes and puncture marks are found throughout entelodont-bearing sites in the American Great Plains, including a skull of Merycoidodon with an embedded incisor of the entelodont Archaeotherium.

Some entelodonts may have engaged in active predation, though the extent of this behavior is debated. Several species of modern pigs occasionally engage in predation, and even traditional herbivores like camels show dental wear consistent with scavenging. Entelodonts occur in some well-preserved sites that allow reconstruction of fossil ecosystems. In the White River formation, many mammals filled large-predator niches, including cat-like saber-toothed nimravids, amphicyonids ("bear-dogs"), borophagine dogs, and hyaenodontid hyaenodonts. The number and variety of large specialized hypercarnivores in the environment suggests the entelodonts found there (Archeotherium and later, Daeodon) would not have been major predators. However, one example of circumstantial evidence for predation is a fossil find in the White River Formation of Wyoming, representing a cache of partial skeletons and other remains of the early camelid Poebrotherium. The carcasses were covered with large punctures on the skull, neck, and the transition from the thoracic to lumbar vertebrae, which have been attributed to predation and scavenging by Archaeotherium. Entelodon's tooth microwear showed no overlap with the modern brown bear (Ursus arctos), and it probably did not actively hunt large mammals as part of its normal diet.

=== Intraspecific behavior ===
The jaw structure and estimated musculature hold numerous lines of evidence indicating that entelodonts could open their mouths unusually wide. This trait may have been useful in hunting or feeding on carrion, but similar adaptations have also been linked to competitive behaviors in herbivores. Hippos, a related group with similar adaptations, are aggressive herbivores that can open their jaws up to 150 degrees and display enlarged canines in order to intimidate rivals. Male hippos engage in head-to-head "yawning" and jaw-wrestling contests, while females attack by approaching from the side and slamming their head into the opponent's body. The wide gape and low skulls of entelodonts would have assisted biting competitions, which are supported by fossil evidence. Large bite marks, including healed punctures, are common on skulls of various American entelodonts. These wounds are concentrated above the sinuses, and are only found on adult specimens. One could easily draw comparisons between these bite marks and the wide range of intraspecific competition over mates or territories in modern artiodactyls. Snout biting in particular is a common competitive behavior among male camels, another group of "primitive" artiodactyls. Ribcage injuries have been attributed to intraspecies aggression in Archaeotherium. One possible function for the anterior tubercles is as a support for toughened skin, which would have acted as a buffer or display feature during competitive behavior.

== In popular culture ==
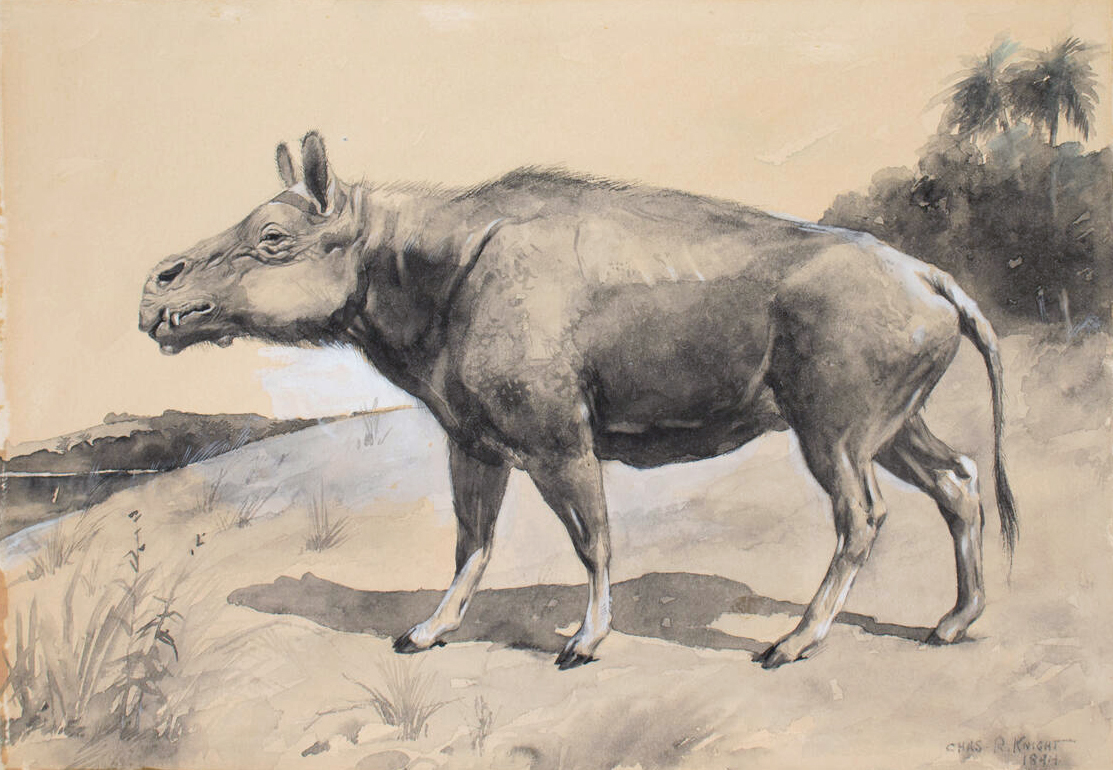
Charles R. Knight's depiction of Entelodon (~1890s)

In popular media, entelodonts are sometimes nicknamed hell pigs or terminator pigs.

Entelodonts appear in the third episode of the popular BBC documentary Walking with Beasts, where, in the program, the narrator always refers to the creatures as "entelodonts" rather than a more specific genus, such as Entelodon. The same creatures appear in another BBC production, the 2001 remake of The Lost World.

Entelodonts were also the main focus of episode 4 of National Geographic Channel's show Prehistoric Predators in an episode titled "Killer Pig". The episode featured a number of claims unproven or disproven by science, such as Archaeotherium (identified as "entelodont") being the top predator of the American Badlands, and evolving directly into the even larger Daeodon (called "Dinohyus" in the episode).

== See also ==
- Megafauna
- Sanitheriidae
- Metridiochoerus
- Megalochoerus
- Notochoerus
