= Tarkops =

Tarkops Temporal range: Lutetian

Scientific classification
- Kingdom: Animalia
- Phylum: Chordata
- Class: Mammalia
- Order: Primates
- Family: †Omomyidae
- Genus: †Tarkops
- Species: †T. mckennai

Binomial name
- †Tarkops mckennai Ni et al., 2009

Extinct genus of omomyid primate

Tarkops is an extinct monotypic genus of omomyid primate that lived in East Asia during the Lutetian stage of the Eocene epoch. Its only species is Tarkops mckennai.

== Etymology ==
The generic name Tarkops alludes to the previously named genus Tarka, with the suffix -ops being Greek for eye. The specific epithet of the type species, Tarkops mckennai, honours Malcolm C. McKenna, the palaeontologist who described the first North American tarkadectines known to science.
