= Brachyhyops =

Brachyhyops Temporal range: Middle to Late Eocene (Lutetian–Priabonian), 45–33.9 Ma

Scientific classification
- Kingdom: Animalia
- Phylum: Chordata
- Class: Mammalia
- Order: Artiodactyla
- Family: †Entelodontidae
- Genus: †Brachyhyops; Colbert, 1937

Type species
- †Brachyhyops wyomingensis Colbert, 1937

Species
- B. wyomingensis Colbert 1937; B. trofimovi (Dashzeveg 1976); B. neimonngoliensis Wang & Qiu 2002; B. viensis Russell 1980

Synonyms
- Eoentelodon trofimovi Dashzeveg 1976; Dyscritochoerus lapointensis

Extinct genus of mammals

Brachyhyops is an extinct genus of entelodont artiodactyl mammal that lived during the Eocene Epoch of western North America and Asia. The first fossil remains of Brachyhyops are recorded from the late Eocene deposits of Beaver Divide in central Wyoming and discovered by paleontology crews from the Carnegie Museum of Natural History during the early 20th century. The type species, Brachyhyops wyomingensis, is based on a single skull and was named by E.H. Colbert in 1937, but was not officially described until 1938. During the latter half of the 20th century, additional specimens from North America have been recorded from Saskatchewan and as far south as Texas, indicating that Brachyhyops had a broad distribution and was well-dispersed throughout western North America. The oldest species, as well as the geologically the oldest entelodont, B. yunnanensis was found within the Lumeiyi Formation, corresponds to the late Lutetian to early Bartonian. More recent discoveries from Eocene deposits in Mongolia lead to the recognition of a second species of Brachyhyops, B trofimovi.

It is notable that the oldest specimens of Brachyhyops are middle Eocene in age and have been recorded exclusively from southern Asia, whereas specimens from the late Eocene only occur in the northern part of the continent. This implies that the genus Brachyhyops most likely originated in southern Asia, migrated north and eventually dispersed into western North America.

== Discovery ==
In 1934, crew members of the Carnegie Museum paleontological expedition discovered the holotype of Brachyhyops wyomingensis (CM 12048) from the uppermost beds of the Eocene White River Formation, in a member known as the Big Sand Draw Sandstone Lentil, at Beaver Divide, Wyoming. The specimen consists of a single, exceptionally well preserved, but severely distorted, isolated skull with no mandibles or post cranial material. Since its initial discovery, several other partial specimens of Brachyhyops have been recorded within North America and Asia. Currently, four species of Brachyhyops have been recognized; two from Asia and two within North America, and include Brachyhyops trofimovi from Mongolia, B. neimongoliensis from northern China, B. viensis from Saskatchewan, Canada; Wyoming, and New Mexico, USA, and lastly, B. wyomingensis from Wyoming, Utah, and Texas, USA.

== Description ==
The holotype (CM 12048) of Brachyhyops wyomingensis was diagnosed by Edwin H. Colbert in 1938 as a medium sized skull with a relatively short snout and a length that is comparable to the skull of a modern peccary. The portion of the skull behind the eye socket is greater compared to the portion of the skull in front of the eye socket due to the short size of the snout. The dentition is I3(?)-C1-P4-M3, indicating in the upper jaw the number of incisors, canines, premolars, and molars respectively. Colbert compared B. wyomingensis to Helohyus, Chaeropotamus, Achaenodon, and Parahyus based on tooth shape. No mandibles were preserved with the holotype specimen and therefore dentition of the lower jaws could not be determined. The overall width of the skull is broad and having widely separated parietal crests. In addition, the zygomatic arches are deepened and expanded below and behind the eye socket, contributing to the wide skull shape, which is very similar to other entelodonts. The rear portion of eye socket is closed and situated directly above the last two molars. Articulation surfaces for the lower jaws; the glenoids, are broad, shallow, and situated around the occlusal line of the upper cheek teeth. Both paroccipital processes are short and parietals are weakly developed. The basicranium, or occiput, is considered basal.

== Classification and evolution ==
Brachyhyops is an artiodactyl which has a poorly resolved evolutionary status that continues to be subject to revision. Colbert initially classified Brachyhyops strictly within the bunodontids based on its bunodont-like tooth shape. More recent studies revised the evolutionary relationship of Brachyhyops and it has now been recognized as a very basal entelodontid that might represent the origin of the clade Entelodontidae, which also includes members such as the Oligocene Archaeotherium and Miocene Daeodon.

== Taxonomy ==
Brachyhyops was named by Colbert (1937) [also said to be 1938]. The type species is B. wyomingensis. It was assigned to Artiodactyla by Colbert (1937); assigned to Suina by Effinger (1998), and was assigned to Entelodontidae by Carroll (1988).

=== Merger with Eoentelodon ===
Eoentelodon was synonymized subjectively with Brachyhyops by Lucas and Emry (2004) as "Brachyhyops yunnanensis." However, in 2007, I. Vislobokova determined that Eoentelodon was not only distinct from Brachyhyops, but more closely related to Proentelodon, another primitive entelodont found in slightly older Middle Eocene strata of Mongolia, and placed Eoentelodon and Proentelodon in their own subfamily, Proentelodontinae.

== Fossil distribution ==
Fossils have been uncovered from Texas to Uintah County, Utah to Saskatchewan, Canada as well as Jiangsu, China.

== Paleobiogeography ==
=== Asian distribution ===
The oldest fossil material that is assigned to Brachyhyops is early to late Middle Eocene in age, and recorded from six Asian localities, predominantly Mongolia, China, with the lone exception of a single location in Kazakhstan. Currently, two localities in southern Asia yield the oldest Brachyhyops material known. The first locality is situated in the northwestern Yunnan of southern China, and specimens of Brachyhyops sp. are recorded from the early middle, or late middle Eocene Xiangshan Formation. No Brachyhyops specimens from the lower to middle Eocene have been recorded from northern Asia; instead, the four remaining localities are all younger (late Eocene) in age and include the southeastern Mongolian taxa B. trofimovi from the Ergilin Dzo Formation at the Khoer Dzan locality and Brachyhyops? sp. from the Ergilin Dzo Formation at the Ergilin Dzo locality. A single taxon, B. neimongolensis, is recorded from the upper Eocene Ulan Gochu Formation of northern China. Lastly, material assigned to ‘Eoentelodon sp.’ (revised as Brachyhyops sp. by Tsubamoto et al.) is recorded from the lower Aksyir ‘svita’ in eastern Kazakhstan, which was later correlated to the late Eocene Ergilian Asian Land Mammal ‘age’ (ALMA) by Emry et al. and Lucas et al.

=== North American distribution ===
Brachyhyops is the oldest entelodont from North America and is recorded exclusively from late Eocene (late Duchesnean – early Chadronian) age deposits. Their geographic range is restricted to western North America and spans from Saskatchewan, Canada to as far south as Big Bend, Texas, USA. A total of nine localities have yielded Brachyhyops material. The Cypress Hills Formation in Saskatchewan, Canada, suggests an early Chadronian age, approximately 37 Ma, and represents the type locality for Brachyhyops viensis as well as the northernmost area in which Brachyhyops specimens have been recorded. Apparently an undocumented Brachyhyops specimen has been recorded from the late Eocene White River Formation of Montana, however, the exact museum location where this specimen is housed remains unknown. Three localities in Wyoming yielded Brachyhyops material and these include a partial skull roof and maxilla from the lower White River Formation (late Eocene) of the Flagstaff Rim, Wyoming. Based on size and tooth shape, these specimens have been assigned to B. viensis. The next locality in Wyoming is the type locality for B. wyomingensis which was recorded from the Big Sand Draw Lentil of the White River Formation at Beaver Divide, and comprises a single skull without mandibles. The third locality yielded cranial fragments that are assigned to B. viensis and were recorded from the lower strata of the White River Formation at Canyon Creek, approximately 50 km east of Beaver Divide. Additional Brachyhyops wyomingensis material was recorded from a single location in northeastern Utah, namely the Lapoint Member of the Duchesne River Formation, which has an age of approximately 39.74 ± 0.07 Ma based on radioisotopic dates from nearby volcanic ashes. Two localities within New Mexico yielded Brachyhyops material and include a single molar (m1) from the lower jaw that was assigned to B. viensis and recorded within the Duchesnean interval of the Galisteo Formation in north central New Mexico, and is of late Duchesnean (38 Ma) age. An additional specimen was recorded from the upper Baca Formation at Mariano Mesa in west central New Mexico and is also situated within the Duchesnean. This specimen comprises a single premolar and four molars (p3 – m4) from a single right lower jaw and are assigned to B. wyomingensis based on the shape and dimensions of the teeth. The final locality within North America is located in Trans-Pecos, Texas, USA, and contains well documented records of Brachyhyops wyomingensis from the late Duchesnean Porvenir local fauna which is situated above a volcanic ash that is radioisotopically dated to 37.8 ± 0.15 Ma. The fact that there is no stratigraphic overlap between northern and southern Asian Brachyhyops specimens, suggests that Brachyhyops originated in southern Asia during the early and late middle Eocene and continuously dispersed into northern Asia. Long term exposure of the Beringian land bridge during the late Eocene promoted continuous intercontinental dispersal from Asia into North America, resulting in further dispersal and diversification of Brachyhyops across western North America during the late Eocene.

== Diet ==
The dentition of Brachyhyops is heterodont, which forms a complex set of different teeth including incisors, large canines, premolars, and molars, which are used to capture and process a wide variety of food items including both meat and vegetation. Despite their heterodont tooth condition, there has been a considerable amount of debate regarding the diet of Brachyhyops and various other entelodontids with similar dentition, such as Archaeotherium and Daeodon. Researchers have proposed different dietary hypotheses based on the heterodont dentition and shape of the teeth, interpreting entelodontids as rooting, pig-like omnivores, browsers or even active predators, based on wear grooves on their dentition. By studying well-preserved fossils, Joeckel re-evaluated these interpretations and performed several modeled analyses regarding the wear patterns on the dentition and structure of the skull (in particular the growth series and muscle reconstruction of the skull) and concluded an omnivorous diet for Archeaotherium, and most likely Brachyhyops, in which scavenging and active hunting appears to have played a possible role.

== Paleoecology ==
The habitat in which Brachyhyops occurred appears to be savannah-woodland or open grassland and lived alongside a diversity of other herbivores and carnivores in Eocene Asia and western North America.
