= Auguste Aymard =

French prehistorian and palaeontologist (1808–1889)

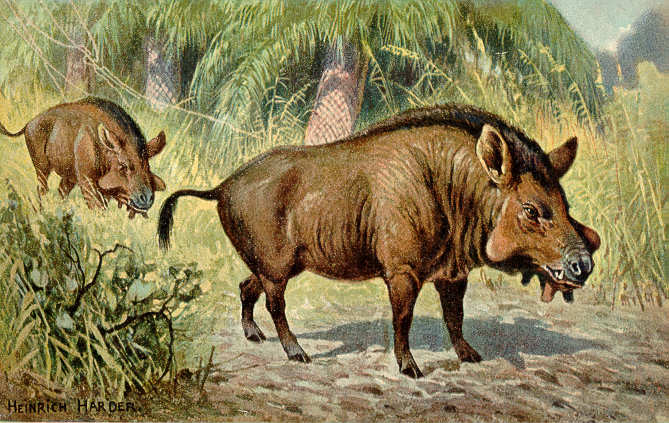
Entelodon

Auguste Aymard (5 December 1808 – 26 June 1889) was a French prehistorian and palaeontologist who lived and died in Puy-en-Velay (Haute-Loire). He described the fossil Entelodon magnus and the fossil genera Anancus and Amphechinus. Auguste Aymard was the archivist for the Departement Haute-Loire and Conservateur of Musée du Puy-en-Velay. He made archaeological discoveries in Puy-en-Velay, Polignac, Haute-Loire and Espaly-Saint-Marcel.

== Works ==
- Aymard, A., 1848, Essai monographique sur un nouveau genre de Mammifère fossile trouvé dans la Haute-Loire, et nommé Entélodon, Annales de la Société d’Agriculture Sciences, Arts et Commerce du Puy, Vol.12, 1848, pp. 227–268
- Aymard, A. 1854, Acquisitions d’ossements fossiles trouvés à Sainzelle, commune de Polignac; aperçu descriptif sur ce curieux gisement et détermination des espèces fossiles qu’il renferme, Annales de la Société d’Agriculture Sciences, Arts et Commerce du Puy, Vol. 18, 1854, pp. 51–54
- Aymard, A. 1854, Des terrains fossilifères du bassin supérieur de la Loire, Comptes Rendus des Séances de l’Académie des Sciences, Paris, Vol. 38, 1854, pp. 673–677
