= Erlianhyus =

Erlianhyus Temporal range: Middle Eocene

Scientific classification
- Kingdom: Animalia
- Phylum: Chordata
- Class: Mammalia
- Order: Artiodactyla
- Clade: Cetancodontamorpha
- Genus: †Erlianhyus; Li & Li, 2021

Type species
- Erlianhyus primitivus Li & Li, 2021

Extinct genus of carnivorous ungulate from Eocene epoch

Erlianhyus is a genus of cetancodontamorph artiodactyl that lived during the Middle Eocene in China. It is monotypic and known from one species, E. primitivus.

== Taxonomy ==
The holotype of Erlianhyus (IVPP V 28275) was discovered in strata from the Irdin Manha Formation. Its binomial name is derived from the Erlian Basin, in which it was discovered, and the suffix -hyus, which is often applied to bunodont artiodactyls. The species name, primitivus, refers to it bearing relatively primitive features. Erlianhyus was originally regarded as the sister taxon of a clade containing dichobunids, anthracotheriids and suoids. In 2023, Yu and colleagues performed a phylogenetic analysis that recovered it in a polytomy with Andrewsarchus and Achaenodon.

== Description ==
Erlianhyus is known from a partial maxilla that preserves teeth P^{3}–M^{3}. The molars are bunodont and bear weak cristae, similar to entelodontids. Similarly M^{1} in both Erlianhyus and entelodonts lacks lingual cingulum. However, the molars have a large and lingually-positioned metaconule and the postmetaconule crista on M^{1} and M^{2} are distinct, suggesting that it does not belong to that clade.
