= Proentelodon =

Proentelodon Temporal range: Middle Eocene (Irdinmanhan to Sharamurunian), 46.5–40 Ma

Scientific classification
- Kingdom: Animalia
- Phylum: Chordata
- Class: Mammalia
- Order: Artiodactyla
- Clade: Cetancodontamorpha
- Genus: Proentelodon

Type species
- †Proentelodon minutus Vislobokova, 2008

Extinct genus of Artiodactyls

Proentelodon is an extinct genus of Cetancodontamorpha artiodactyl from the Middle Eocene of Mongolia. Proentelodon was described from the Middle Eocene Khaichin Ula II Fauna in Mongolia. It was formally suggested to be the oldest representative of the family Entelodontidae. However, more recent studies have questioned its placement within the family due to the differentiation in dentition. Cladistic analysis have recovered Proentelodon as a sister taxon to entelodonts, within Cetacodontamorpha.
