= Neimengomys =

Neimengomys Temporal range: Thanetian

Scientific classification
- Kingdom: Animalia
- Phylum: Chordata
- Class: Mammalia
- Order: Rodentia
- Family: †Alagomyidae
- Genus: †Neimengomys
- Species: †N. qii

Binomial name
- †Neimengomys qii Meng et al., 2007

Extinct genus of alagomyid rodent

Neimengomys is an extinct monotypic genus of alagomyid rodent that lived in East Asia during the Thanetian stage of the Palaeocene epoch.

== Etymology ==
The generic name Neimengomys derives from the Chinese term Nei Meng referring to Inner Mongolia and the Greek word mys, meaning mouse. The specific epithet of the type species, Neimengomys qii, honours Qi Tao of the Institute of Vertebrate Palaeontology and Palaeoanthropology (IVPP), who discovered the first Tribosphenomys specimens via screenwashing at Subeng.
