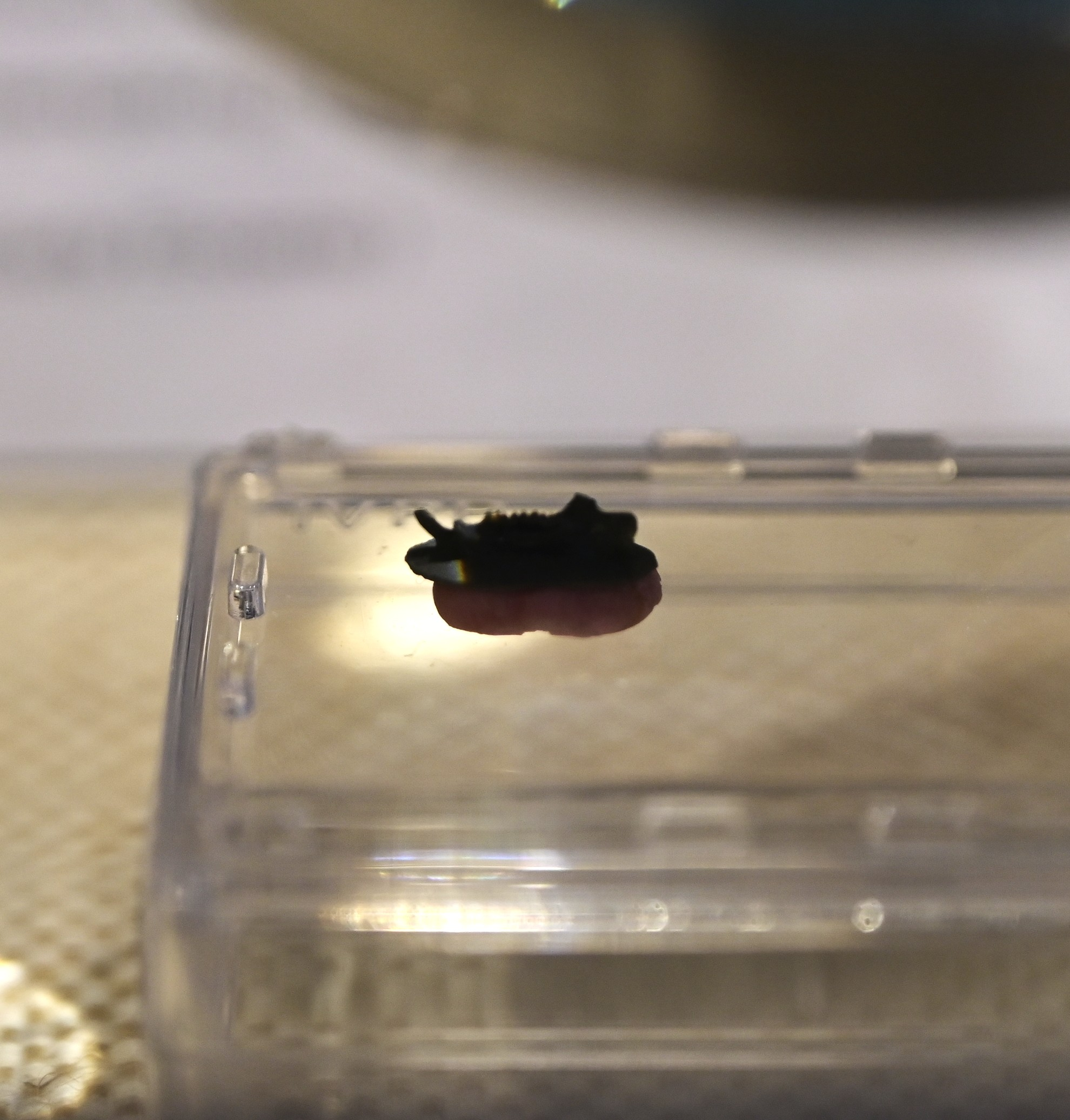
- Lower jaw of Tribosphenomys

Scientific classification
- Kingdom: Animalia
- Phylum: Chordata
- Class: Mammalia
- Order: Rodentia
- Family: †Alagomyidae; Dashzeveg, 1990

Genera
- †Alagomys †Neimengomys †Tribosphenomys

= Alagomyidae =

Alagomyidae Temporal range: Early Paleocene–Early Eocene

Extinct family of rodents

Alagomyidae is a family of rodents known from the late Paleocene and early Eocene of Asia and North America (McKenna and Bell, 1997). Alagomyids have been identified as the most basal rodents, lying outside the common ancestry of living forms (Meng et al., 1994). Because of their phylogenetic position and their conservative dental morphology, alagomyids have played a key role in investigations of the origins and relationships of rodents (Meng et al., 1994; Meng and Wyss, 2001).
