= Paleocene =

First epoch of the Paleogene Period

- 66 – 56 Ma
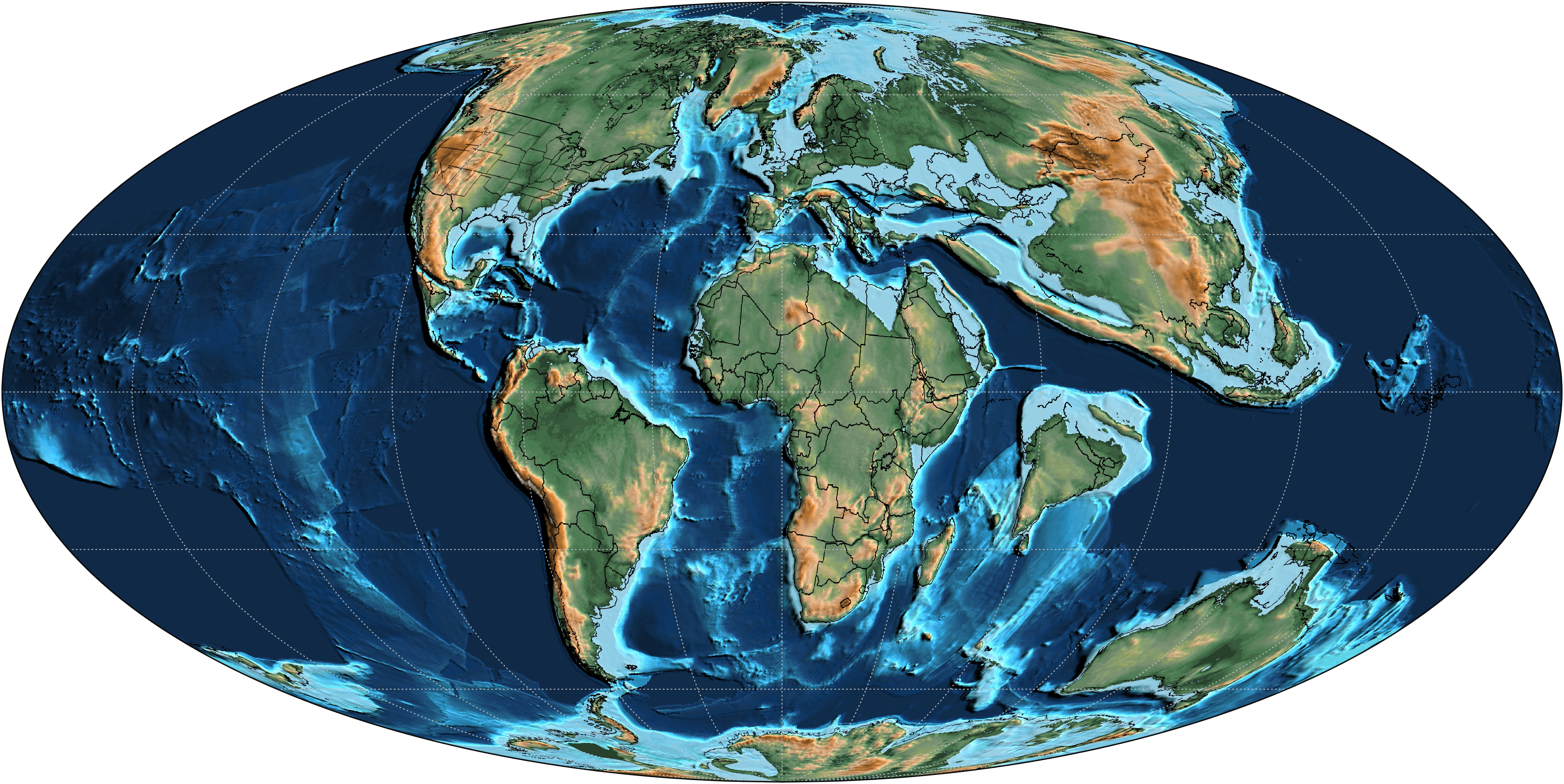
- A map of Earth as it appeared 60 million years ago during the Paleocene Epoch, Selandian Age

Chronology
← / K-Pg mass extinction; ← / PETM
Ages of the Paleocene Epoch, according to the ICS as of January 2020. Axis scale: millions of years ago.

Etymology
- Name formality: Formal
- Name ratified: 1978
- Alternate spelling(s): Palaeocene

Usage information
- Regional usage: Global (ICS)
- Time scale(s) used: ICS Time Scale

Definition
- Chronological unit: Epoch
- Stratigraphic unit: Series
- First proposed by: Wilhelm Philipp Schimper, 1874
- Time span formality: Formal
- Lower boundary definition: Iridium-enriched layer associated with a major meteorite impact and subsequent K–Pg extinction event
- Lower boundary GSSP: El Kef Section, El Kef, Tunisia; 36.1537°N 8.6486°E
- Lower GSSP ratified: 1991
- Upper boundary definition: Strong negative anomaly in δ^{13}C values at the PETM
- Upper boundary GSSP: Dababiya section, Luxor, Egypt; 25.5000°N 32.5311°E
- Upper GSSP ratified: 2003

The Paleocene (IPA: /ˈpæli.əsiːn, -i.oʊ-, ˈpeɪli-/ PAL-ee-ə-seen, -ee-oh-, PAY-lee-), or Palaeocene, is a geological epoch that lasted from about 66 to 56 Ma (million years ago). It is the first epoch of the Paleogene Period in the modern Cenozoic Era. The name comes from Ancient Greek παλαιός (palaiós), meaning "old", and καινός (kainós), meaning "new", translating to "the old part of the Eocene".

The epoch is bracketed by two major events in Earth's history. The K–Pg extinction event, brought on by an asteroid impact (Chicxulub impact) and possibly volcanism (Deccan Traps), marked the beginning of the Paleocene and killed off 75% of species, most famously the non-avian dinosaurs. The end of the epoch was marked by the Paleocene–Eocene Thermal Maximum (PETM), which was a major climatic event wherein about 2,500–4,500 gigatons of carbon were released into the atmosphere and ocean systems, causing a spike in global temperatures and ocean acidification.

In the Paleocene, the continents of the Northern Hemisphere were still connected via some land bridges; and South America, Antarctica, and Australia had not completely separated yet. The Rocky Mountains were being uplifted, the Americas had not yet joined, the Indian Plate had begun its collision with Asia, and the North Atlantic Igneous Province was forming in the third-largest magmatic event of the last 150 million years. In the oceans, the thermohaline circulation probably was much different from what it is today, with downwellings occurring in the North Pacific rather than the North Atlantic, and water density mainly being controlled by salinity rather than temperature.

The K–Pg extinction event caused a floral and faunal turnover of species, with previously abundant species being replaced by previously uncommon ones. In the Paleocene, with a global average temperature of about 24–25 °C (75–77 °F), compared to 14 °C (57 °F) in more recent times, the Earth had a greenhouse climate without permanent ice sheets at the poles, like the preceding Mesozoic. As such, there were forests worldwide—including at the poles—but they had low species richness in regards to plant life, and were populated by mainly small creatures that were rapidly evolving to take advantage of the recently emptied Earth. Though some animals attained great size, most remained rather small. The forests grew quite dense in the general absence of large herbivores. Mammals proliferated in the Paleocene, and the earliest placental and marsupial mammals are recorded from this time, but most Paleocene taxa have ambiguous affinities. In the seas, ray-finned fish rose to dominate open ocean and recovering reef ecosystems.

== Etymology ==
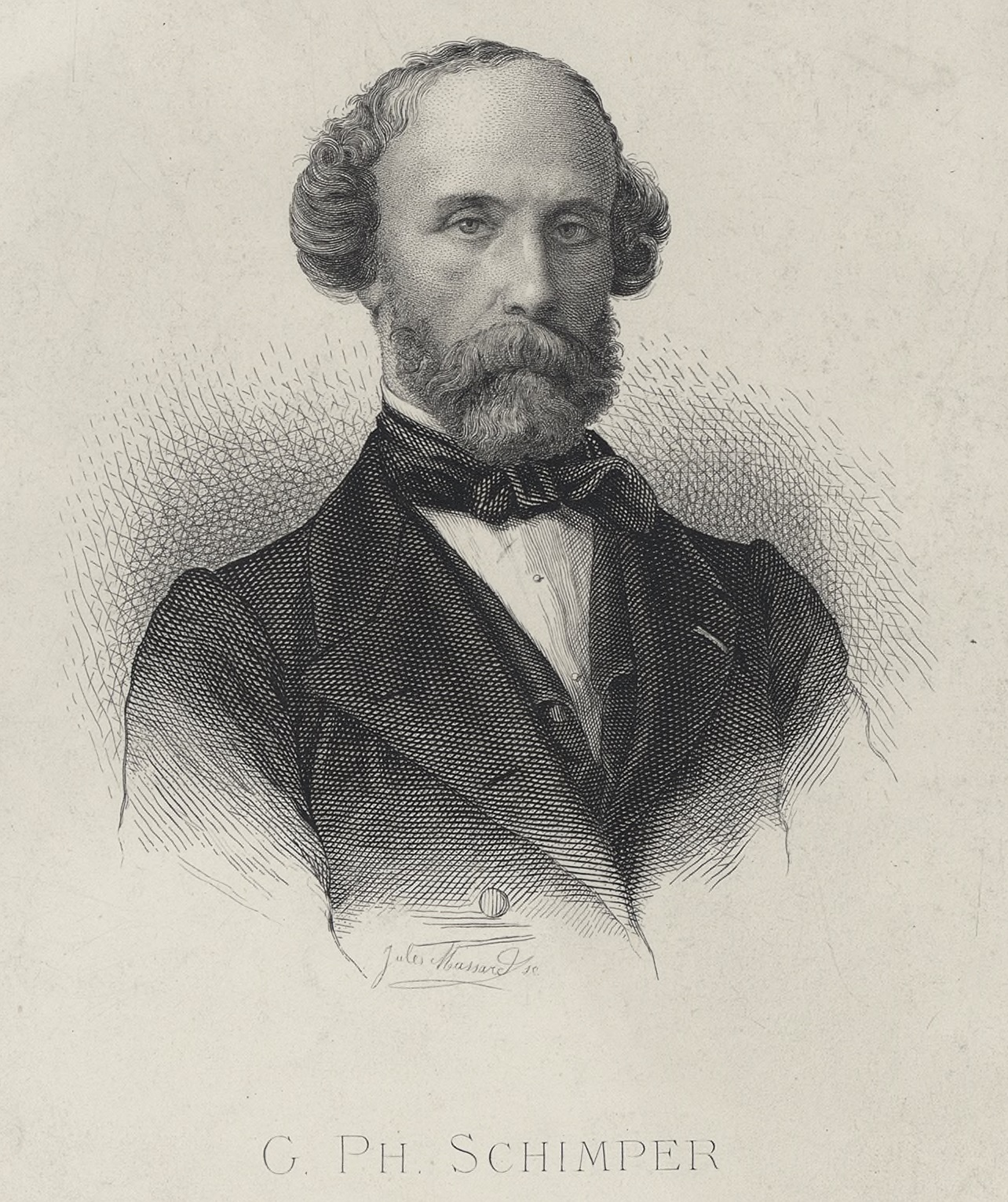
Wilhelm Philipp Schimper coined the term "Paleocene".

The word "Paleocene" was first used by French paleobotanist and geologist Wilhelm Philipp Schimper in 1874 while describing deposits near Paris (spelled "Paléocène" in his treatise). By this time, Italian geologist Giovanni Arduino had divided the history of life on Earth into the Primary (Paleozoic), Secondary (Mesozoic), and Tertiary in 1759; French geologist Jules Desnoyers had proposed splitting off the Quaternary from the Tertiary in 1829; and Scottish geologist Charles Lyell (ignoring the Quaternary) had divided the Tertiary Epoch into the Eocene, Miocene, Pliocene, and New Pliocene (Holocene) Periods in 1833. (Note: In Lyell's time, epochs were divided into periods. In modern geology, periods are divided into epochs.) British geologist John Phillips had proposed the Cenozoic in 1840 in place of the Tertiary, and Austrian paleontologist Moritz Hörnes had introduced the Paleogene for the Eocene and Neogene for the Miocene and Pliocene in 1853. After decades of inconsistent usage, the newly formed International Commission on Stratigraphy (ICS), in 1969, standardized stratigraphy based on the prevailing opinions in Europe: the Cenozoic Era subdivided into the Tertiary and Quaternary sub-eras, and the Tertiary subdivided into the Paleogene and Neogene Periods. In 1978, the Paleogene was officially defined as the Paleocene, Eocene, and Oligocene Epochs; and the Neogene as the Miocene and Pliocene Epochs. In 1989, Tertiary and Quaternary were removed from the time scale due to the arbitrary nature of their boundary, but Quaternary was reinstated in 2009.

The term "Paleocene" from Ancient Greek παλαιός (palaiós), meaning "old", and καινός (kainós), meaning "new", specifically from "Eocene", and so means "the old part of the Eocene". The Eocene, in turn, is derived from Ancient Greek Ἠώς (Ēṓs), meaning "dawn", and καινός (kainós), meaning "new", as the epoch saw the dawn of recent, or modern, life. Paleocene did not come into broad usage until around 1920. In North America and mainland Europe, the standard spelling is "Paleocene", whereas it is "Palaeocene" in the UK. Geologist T. C. R. Pulvertaft has argued that the latter spelling is incorrect because this would imply either a translation of "old recent" or a derivation from "pala" and "Eocene", which would be incorrect because the prefix palæo- uses the ligature æ instead of "a" and "e" individually, so only both characters or neither should be dropped, not just one.

== Geology ==
=== Boundaries ===
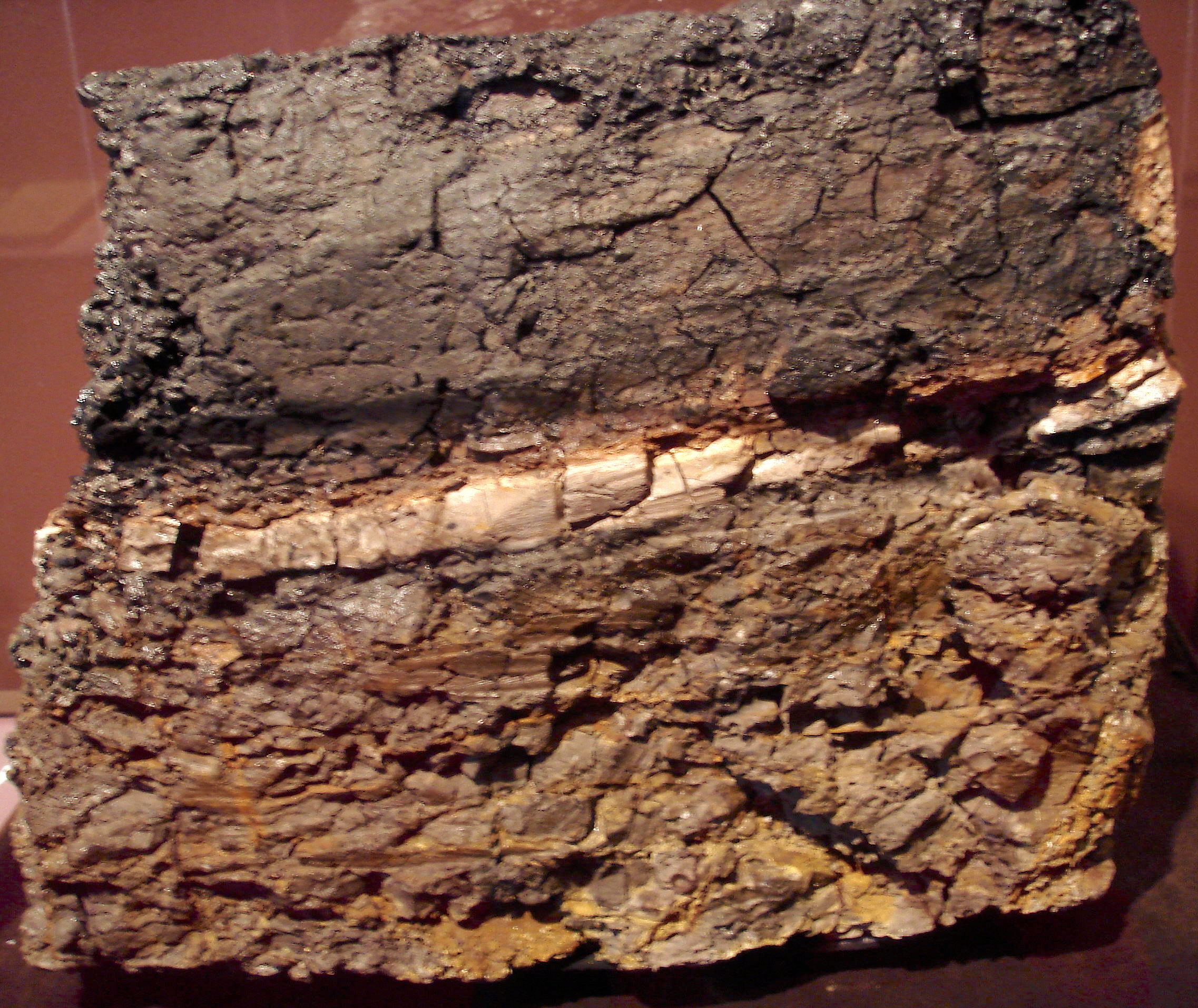
K–Pg boundary recorded in a Wyoming rock (the white stripe in the middle)

The Paleocene Epoch is the 10 million year time interval directly after the K–Pg extinction event, which ended the Cretaceous Period and the Mesozoic Era, and initiated the Cenozoic Era and the Paleogene Period. It is divided into three ages: the Danian spanning 66 to 61.6 Ma, the Selandian spanning 61.6 to 59.2 Ma, and the Thanetian spanning 59.2 to 56 Ma. It is succeeded by the Eocene.

The K–Pg boundary is clearly defined in the fossil record in numerous places around the world by a high-iridium band, as well as discontinuities with fossil flora and fauna. It is generally thought that a 10 to 15 km (6 to 9 mi) wide asteroid impact, forming the Chicxulub Crater in the Yucatán Peninsula in the Gulf of Mexico, and Deccan Trap volcanism caused a cataclysmic event at the boundary resulting in the extinction of 75% of all species.

The Paleocene ended with the Paleocene–Eocene thermal maximum, a short period of intense warming and ocean acidification brought about by the release of carbon en masse into the atmosphere and ocean systems, which led to a mass extinction of 30–50% of benthic foraminifera–planktonic species which are used as bioindicators of the health of a marine ecosystem—one of the largest in the Cenozoic. This event happened around 55.8 Ma, and was one of the most significant periods of global change during the Cenozoic.

=== Stratigraphy ===
Geologists divide the rocks of the Paleocene into a stratigraphic set of smaller rock units called stages, each formed during corresponding time intervals called ages. Stages can be defined globally or regionally. For global stratigraphic correlation, the ICS ratify global stages based on a Global Boundary Stratotype Section and Point (GSSP) from a single formation (a stratotype) identifying the lower boundary of the stage. In 1989, the ICS decided to split the Paleocene into three stages: the Danian, Selandian, and Thanetian.

The Danian was first defined in 1847 by German-Swiss geologist Pierre Jean Édouard Desor based on the Danish chalks at Stevns Klint and Faxse, and was part of the Cretaceous, succeeded by the Tertiary Montian Stage. In 1982, after it was shown that the Danian and the Montian are the same, the ICS decided to define the Danian as starting with the K–Pg boundary, thus ending the practice of including the Danian in the Cretaceous. In 1991, the GSSP was defined as a well-preserved section in the El Haria Formation near El Kef, Tunisia, 36.1537°N 8.6486°E, and the proposal was officially published in 2006.

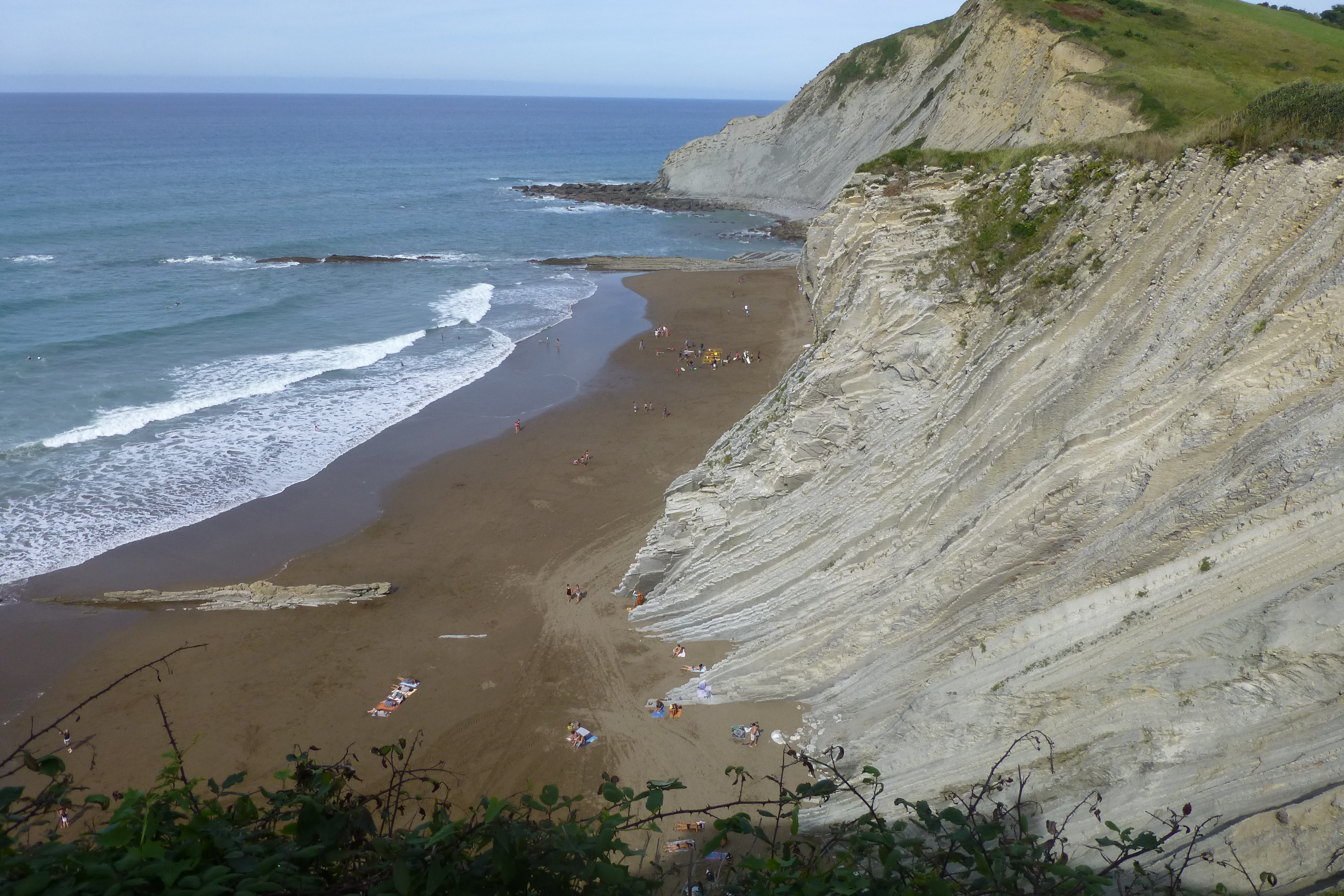
The sea cliffs of Itzurun beach near the town of Zumaia, Spain, the GSSP for the Selandian and Thanetian

The Selandian and Thanetian are both defined in Itzurun beach by the Basque town of Zumaia, 43.3006°N 2.2594°W, as the area is a continuous early Santonian to early Eocene sea cliff outcrop. The Paleocene section is an essentially complete, exposed record 165 m (541 ft) thick, mainly composed of alternating hemipelagic sediments deposited at a depth of about 1,000 m (3,300 ft). The Danian deposits are sequestered into the Aitzgorri Limestone Formation, and the Selandian and early Thanetian into the Itzurun Formation. The Itzurun Formation is divided into groups A and B corresponding to the two stages respectively. The two stages were ratified in 2008, and this area was chosen because of its completion, low risk of erosion, proximity to the original areas the stages were defined, accessibility, and the protected status of the area due to its geological significance.

The Selandian was first proposed by Danish geologist Alfred Rosenkrantz in 1924 based on a section of fossil-rich glauconitic marls overlain by gray clay which unconformably overlies Danian chalk and limestone. The area is now subdivided into the Æbelø Formation, Holmehus Formation, and the Østerrende Clay. The beginning of this stage was defined by the end of carbonate rock deposition from an open ocean environment in the North Sea region (which had been going on for the previous 40 million years). The Selandian deposits in this area are directly overlain by the Eocene Fur Formation—the Thanetian was not represented here—and this discontinuity in the deposition record is why the GSSP was moved to Zumaia. Today, the beginning of the Selandian is marked by the appearances of the nannofossils Fasciculithus tympaniformis, Neochiastozygus perfectus, and Chiasmolithus edentulus, though some foraminifera are used by various authors.

The Thanetian was first proposed by Swiss geologist Eugène Renevier, in 1873; he included the south England Thanet, Woolwich, and Reading formations. In 1880, French geologist Gustave Frédéric Dollfus narrowed the definition to just the Thanet Formation. The Thanetian begins a little after the mid-Paleocene biotic event—a short-lived climatic event caused by an increase in methane—recorded at Itzurun as a dark 1 m (3.3 ft) interval from a reduction of calcium carbonate. At Itzurun, it begins about 29 m (95 ft) above the base of the Selandian, and is marked by the first appearance of the algae Discoaster and a diversification of Heliolithus, though the best correlation is in terms of paleomagnetism. A chron is the occurrence of a geomagnetic reversal—when the North and South poles switch polarities. Chron 1 (C1n) is defined as modern day to about 780,000 years ago, and the n denotes "normal" as in the polarity of today, and an r "reverse" for the opposite polarity. The beginning of the Thanetian is best correlated with the C26r/C26n reversal.

=== Mineral and hydrocarbon deposits ===
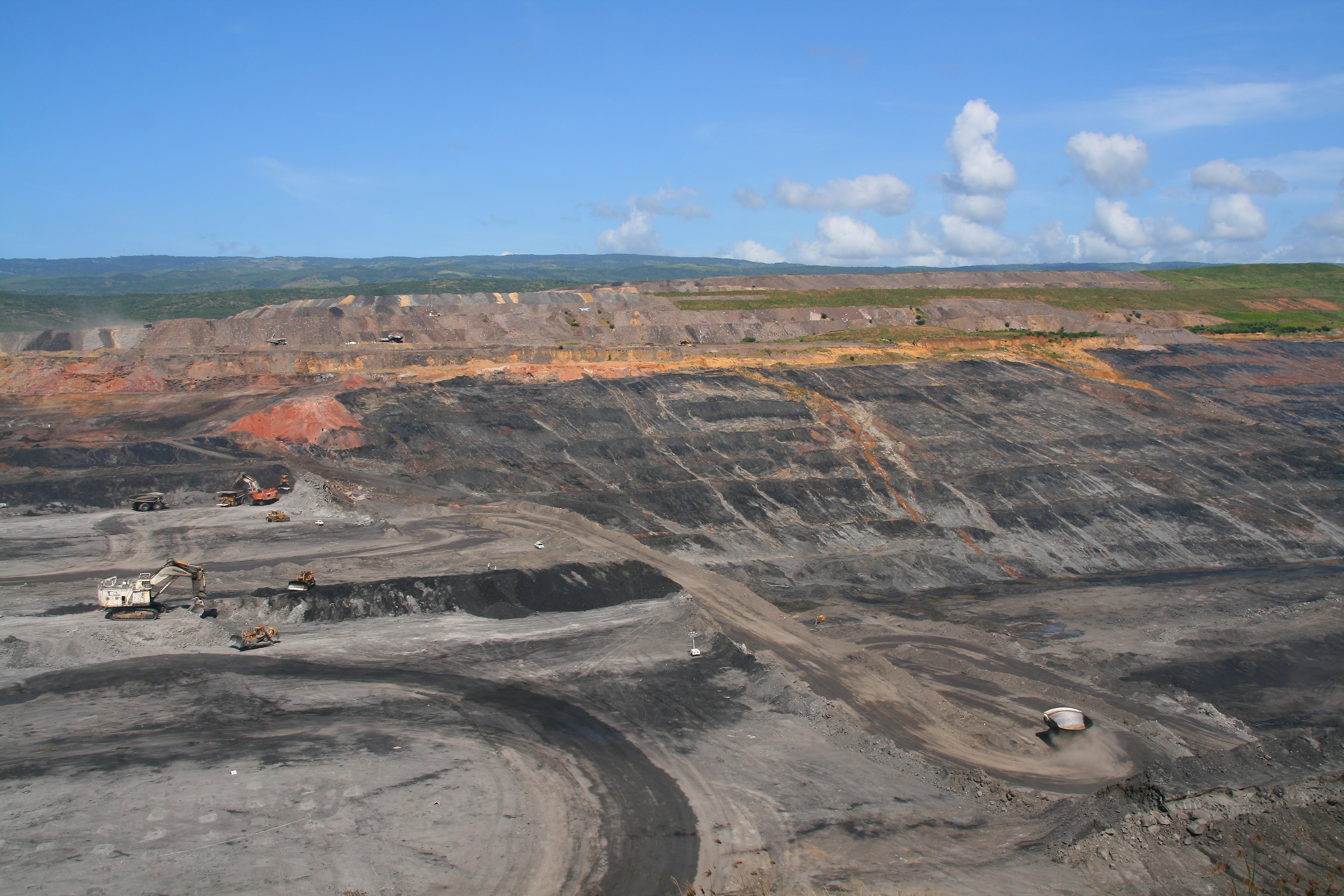
Paleocene coal is extracted at the Cerrejón mine, Colombia's largest open-pit mine

Several economically important coal deposits formed during the Paleocene, such as the sub-bituminous Fort Union Formation in the Powder River Basin of Wyoming and Montana, which produces 43% of American coal; the Wilcox Group in Texas, the richest deposits of the Gulf Coastal Plain; and the Cerrejón mine in Colombia, the largest open-pit mine in the country. Paleocene coal has been mined extensively in Svalbard, Norway, since near the beginning of the 20th century, and late Paleocene and early Eocene coal is widely distributed across the Canadian Arctic Archipelago and northern Siberia. In the North Sea, Paleocene-derived natural gas reserves, when they were discovered, totaled approximately 2.23 trillion m^{3} (7.89 trillion ft^{3}), and oil in place 13.54 billion barrels. Important phosphate deposits—predominantly of francolite—near Métlaoui, Tunisia were formed from the late Paleocene to the early Eocene.

=== Impact craters ===
The crater underneath the Greenlandic Hiawatha Glacier dates to the Paleocene, 58 mya.

Impact craters formed in the Paleocene include: the Connolly Basin crater in Western Australia less than 60 Ma, the Texan Marquez crater 58 Ma, the Greenlandic Hiawatha Glacier crater 58 Ma, and possibly the Jordan Jabel Waqf as Suwwan crater which dates to between 56 and 37 Ma. Vanadium-rich osbornite from the Isle of Skye, Scotland, dating to 60 mya may be impact ejecta. Craters were also formed near the K–Pg boundary, the largest the Mexican Chicxulub crater whose impact was a major precipitator of the K–Pg extinction, and also the Ukrainian Boltysh crater, dated to 65.4 Ma the Canadian Eagle Butte crater (though it may be younger), the Vista Alegre crater (though this may date to about 115 Ma). Silicate glass spherules along the Atlantic coast of the U.S. indicate a meteor impact in the region at the PETM.

== Paleogeography ==
=== Paleotectonics ===
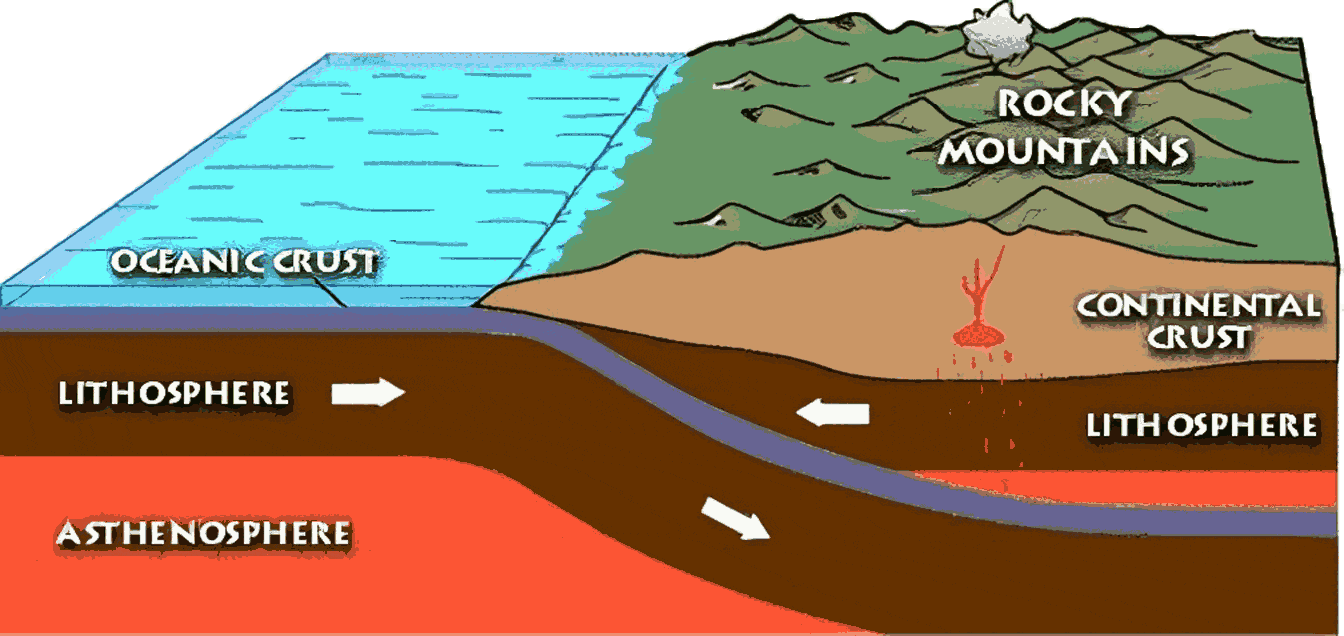
The Laramide orogeny was caused by the subduction of oceanic crust under the North American Plate

During the Paleocene, the continents continued to drift toward their present positions. In the Northern Hemisphere, the former components of Laurasia (North America and Eurasia) were, at times, connected via land bridges: Beringia (at 65.5 and 58 Ma) between North America and East Asia, the De Geer route (from 71 to 63 Ma) between Greenland and Scandinavia, the Thulean route (at 57 and 55.8 Ma) between North America and Western Europe via Greenland, and the Turgai route connecting Europe with Asia (which were otherwise separated by the Turgai Strait at this time).

The Laramide orogeny, which began in the Late Cretaceous, continued to uplift the Rocky Mountains; it ended at the end of the Paleocene. Because of this and a drop in sea levels resulting from tectonic activity, the Western Interior Seaway, which had divided the continent of North America for much of the Cretaceous, had receded.

Between about 60.5 and 54.5 Ma, there was heightened volcanic activity in the North Atlantic region—the third largest magmatic event in the last 150 million years—creating the North Atlantic Igneous Province. The proto-Iceland hotspot is sometimes cited as being responsible for the initial volcanism, though rifting and resulting volcanism have also contributed. This volcanism may have contributed to the opening of the North Atlantic Ocean and seafloor spreading, the divergence of the Greenland Plate from the North American Plate, and, climatically, the PETM by dissociating methane clathrate crystals on the seafloor resulting in the mass release of carbon.

North and South America remained separated by the Central American Seaway, though an island arc (the South Central American Arc) had already formed about 73 Ma. The Caribbean Large Igneous Province (now the Caribbean Plate), which had formed from the Galápagos hotspot in the Pacific in the latest Cretaceous, was moving eastward as the North American and South American plates were getting pushed in the opposite direction due to the opening of the Atlantic (strike-slip tectonics). This motion would eventually uplift the Isthmus of Panama by 2.6 Ma. The Caribbean Plate continued moving until about 50 Ma when it reached its current position.

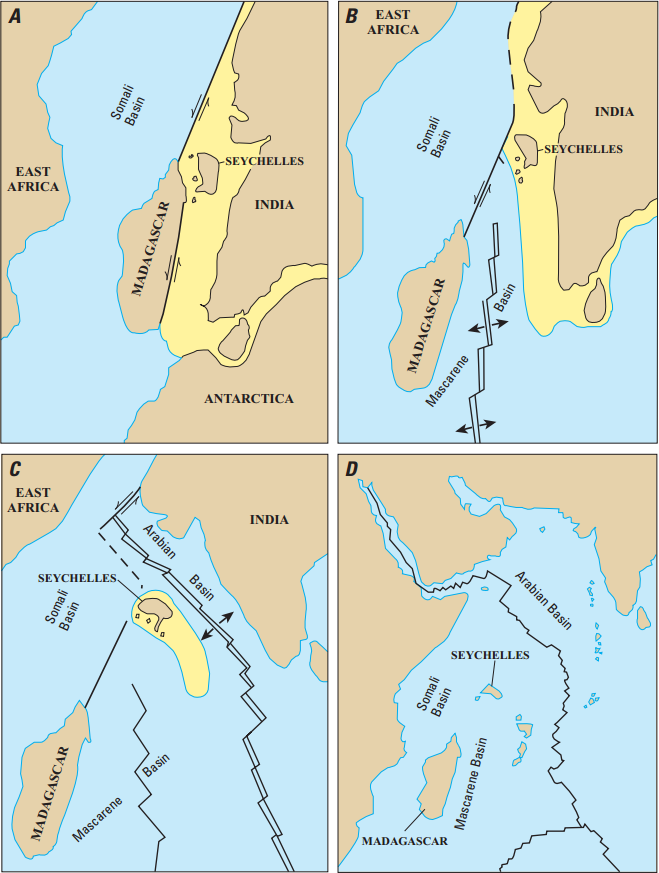
The breakup of Gondwana: A) Early Cretaceous B) Late Cretaceous C) Paleocene D) Present

The components of the former southern supercontinent Gondwanaland in the Southern Hemisphere continued to drift apart, but Antarctica was still connected to South America and Australia. Africa was heading north towards Europe, and the Indian subcontinent towards Asia, which would eventually close the Tethys Ocean. The Indian and Eurasian Plates began colliding in the Paleocene, with uplift (and a land connection) beginning in the Miocene about 24–17 Ma. There is evidence that some plants and animals could migrate between India and Asia during the Paleocene, possibly via intermediary island arcs.

=== Paleoceanography ===
In the modern thermohaline circulation, warm tropical water becomes colder and saltier at the poles and sinks (downwelling or deep water formation) that occurs at the North Atlantic near the North Pole and the Southern Ocean near the Antarctic Peninsula. In the Paleocene, the waterways between the Arctic Ocean and the North Atlantic were somewhat restricted, so North Atlantic Deep Water (NADW) and the Atlantic Meridional Overturning Circulation (AMOC)—which circulates cold water from the Arctic towards the equator—had not yet formed, and so deep water formation probably did not occur in the North Atlantic. The Arctic and Atlantic would not be connected by sufficiently deep waters until the early to middle Eocene.

There is evidence of deep water formation in the North Pacific to at least a depth of about 2,900 m (9,500 ft). The elevated global deep water temperatures in the Paleocene may have been too warm for thermohaline circulation to be predominately heat driven. It is possible that the greenhouse climate shifted precipitation patterns, such that the Southern Hemisphere was wetter than the Northern, or the Southern experienced less evaporation than the Northern. In either case, this would have made the Northern more saline than the Southern, creating a density difference and a downwelling in the North Pacific traveling southward. Deep water formation may have also occurred in the South Atlantic.

It is largely unknown how global currents could have affected global temperature. The formation of the Northern Component Waters by Greenland in the Eocene—the predecessor of the AMOC—may have caused an intense warming in the North Hemisphere and cooling in the Southern, as well as an increase in deep water temperatures. In the PETM, it is possible deep water formation occurred in saltier tropical waters and moved polewards, which would increase global surface temperatures by warming the poles. Also, Antarctica was still connected to South America and Australia, and, because of this, the Antarctic Circumpolar Current—which traps cold water around the continent and prevents warm equatorial water from entering—had not yet formed. Its formation may have been related in the freezing of the continent. Warm coastal upwellings at the poles would have inhibited permanent ice cover. Conversely, it is possible deep water circulation was not a major contributor to the greenhouse climate, and deep water temperatures more likely change as a response to global temperature change rather than affecting it.

In the Arctic, coastal upwelling may have been largely temperature and wind-driven. In summer, the land surface temperature was probably higher than oceanic temperature, and the opposite was true in the winter, which is consistent with monsoon seasons in Asia. Open-ocean upwelling may have also been possible.

== Climate ==
=== Average climate ===
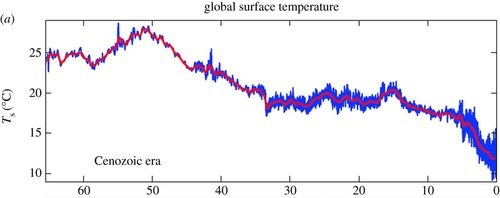
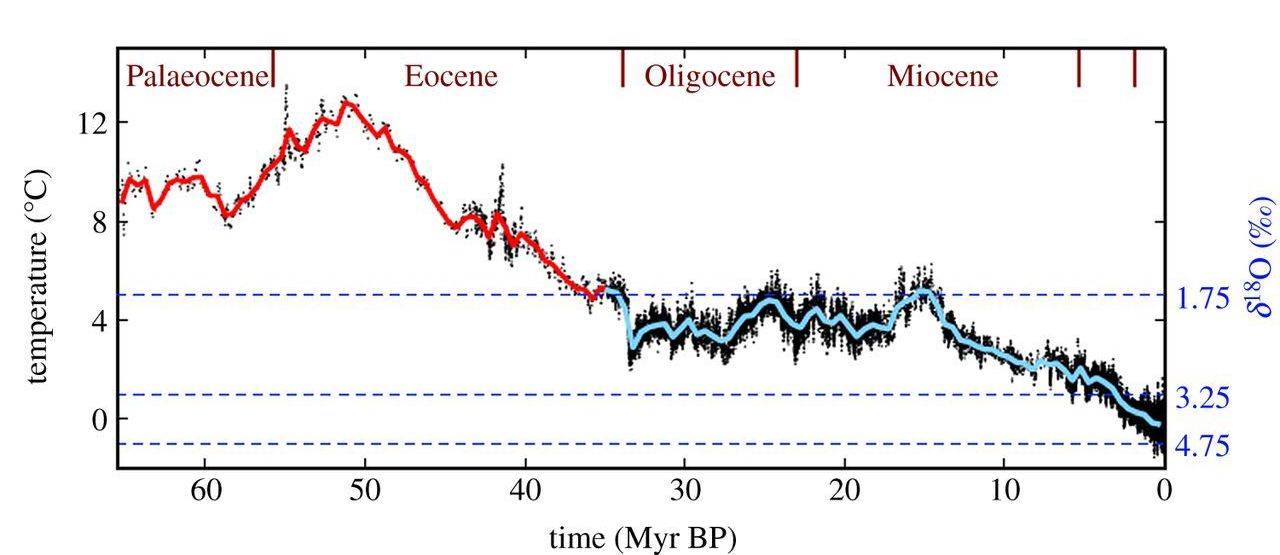
Global average land (above) and deep sea (below) temperatures throughout the Cenozoic

The Paleocene climate was, much like in the Cretaceous, tropical or subtropical, and the poles were temperate, with an average global temperature of roughly 24–25 °C (75–77 °F). For comparison, the average global temperature for the period between 1951 and 1980 was 14 °C (57 °F). The latitudinal temperature gradient was approximately 0.24 °C per degree of latitude. The poles also lacked ice caps, though some alpine glaciation did occur in the Transantarctic Mountains.

The poles probably had a cool temperate climate; northern Antarctica, Australia, the southern tip of South America, what is now the US and Canada, eastern Siberia, and Europe warm temperate; middle South America, southern and northern Africa, South India, Middle America, and China arid; and northern South America, central Africa, North India, middle Siberia, and what is now the Mediterranean Sea tropical. South-central North America had a humid, monsoonal climate along its coastal plain, but conditions were drier to the west and at higher altitudes. Svalbard was temperate, having a mean temperature of 19.2 ± 2.49 °C during its warmest month and 1.7 ± 3.24 °С during its coldest.

Global deep water temperatures in the Paleocene likely ranged from 8–12 °C (46–54 °F), compared to 0–3 °C (32–37 °F) in modern day. Based on the upper limit, average sea surface temperatures (SSTs) at 60°N and S would have been the same as deep sea temperatures, at 30°N and S about 23 °C (73 °F), and at the equator about 28 °C (82 °F). In the Danish Palaeocene sea, SSTs were cooler than those of the preceding Late Cretaceous and the succeeding Eocene. The Paleocene foraminifera assemblage globally indicates a defined deep-water thermocline (a warmer mass of water closer to the surface sitting on top of a colder mass nearer the bottom) persisting throughout the epoch. The Atlantic foraminifera indicate a general warming of sea surface temperature–with tropical taxa present in higher latitude areas–until the Late Paleocene when the thermocline became steeper and tropical foraminifera retreated back to lower latitudes.

Early Paleocene atmospheric CO_{2} levels at what is now Castle Rock, Colorado, were calculated to be between 352 and 1,110 parts per million (ppm), with a median of 616 ppm. Based on this and estimated plant-gas exchange rates and global surface temperatures, the climate sensitivity was calculated to be +3 °C when CO_{2} levels doubled, compared to 7 °C following the formation of ice at the poles. CO_{2} levels alone may have been insufficient in maintaining the greenhouse climate, and some positive feedbacks must have been active, such as some combination of cloud, aerosol, or vegetation related processes. A 2019 study identified changes in orbital eccentricity as the dominant drivers of climate between the late Cretaceous and the early Eocene.

=== Climatic events ===
The effects of the meteor impact and volcanism 66 Ma and the climate across the K–Pg boundary were likely fleeting, and climate reverted to normal in a short time frame. The freezing temperatures probably reversed after three years and returned to normal within decades, sulfuric acid aerosols causing acid rain probably dissipated after 10 years, and dust from the impact blocking out sunlight and inhibiting photosynthesis would have lasted up to a year though potential global wildfires raging for several years would have released more particulates into the atmosphere. For the following half million years, the carbon isotope gradient—a difference in the ^{13}C/^{12}C ratio between surface and deep ocean water, causing carbon to cycle into the deep sea—may have shut down. This, termed a "Strangelove ocean", indicates low oceanic productivity; resultant decreased phytoplankton activity may have led to a reduction in cloud seeds and, thus, marine cloud brightening, causing global temperatures to increase by 6 °C (CLAW hypothesis). Following the extreme disruptions in the aftermath of the K-Pg extinction event, the relatively cool, though still greenhouse, conditions of the Late Cretaceous–Early Palaeogene Cool Interval (LKEPCI) that began in the Late Cretaceous continued.

The Dan–C2 Event 65.2 Ma in the early Danian spanned about 100,000 years, and was characterized by an increase in carbon, particularly in the deep sea. Since the mid-Maastrichtian, more and more carbon had been sequestered in the deep sea possibly due to a global cooling trend and increased circulation into the deep sea. The Dan–C2 event may represent a release of this carbon after deep sea temperatures rose to a certain threshold, as warmer water can dissolve less carbon. Alternatively, the cause of the Dan-C2 event may have been a pulse of Deccan Traps volcanism. Savanna may have temporarily displaced forestland in this interval.

Around 62.2 Ma in the late Danian, there was a warming event and evidence of ocean acidification associated with an increase in carbon; at this time, there was major seafloor spreading in the Atlantic and volcanic activity along the southeast margin of Greenland. The Latest Danian Event, also known as the Top Chron C27n Event, lasted about 200,000 years and resulted in a 1.6–2.8 °C increase in temperatures throughout the water column. Though the temperature in the latest Danian varied at about the same magnitude, this event coincides with an increase of carbon.

About 60.5 Ma at the Danian/Selandian boundary, there is evidence of anoxia spreading out into coastal waters, and a drop in sea levels which is most likely explained as an increase in temperature and evaporation, as there was no ice at the poles to lock up water.

During the mid-Palaeocene biotic event (MPBE), also known as the Early Late Palaeocene Event (ELPE), around 59 Ma (roughly 50,000 years before the Selandian/Thanetian boundary), the temperature spiked probably due to a mass release of the deep sea methane hydrate into the atmosphere and ocean systems. Carbon was probably output for 10–11,000 years, and the aftereffects likely subsided around 52–53,000 years later. There is also evidence this occurred again 300,000 years later in the early Thanetian dubbed MPBE-2. Respectively, about 83 and 132 gigatons of methane-derived carbon were ejected into the atmosphere, which suggests a 2–3 °C (3.6–5.4 °F) rise in temperature, and likely caused heightened seasonality and less stable environmental conditions. It may have also caused an increase of grass in some areas.

From 59.7 to 58.1 Ma, during the late Selandian and early Thanetian, organic carbon burial resulted in a period of climatic cooling, sea level fall and transient ice growth. This interval saw the highest δ^{18}O values of the epoch.

==== Paleocene–Eocene Thermal Maximum ====
The Paleocene–Eocene Thermal Maximum was an approximately 200,000-year-long event where the global average temperature rose by some 5 to 8 °C (9 to 14 °F), and mid-latitude and polar areas may have exceeded modern tropical temperatures of 24–29 °C (75–84 °F). This was due to an ejection of 2,500–4,500 gigatons of carbon into the atmosphere, most commonly explained as the perturbation and release of methane clathrate deposits in the North Atlantic from tectonic activity and resultant increase in bottom water temperatures. Other proposed hypotheses include methane release from the heating of organic matter at the seafloor rather than methane clathrates, or melting permafrost.

The duration of carbon output is controversial, but most likely about 2,500 years. This carbon also interfered with the carbon cycle and caused ocean acidification, and potentially altered and slowed down ocean currents, the latter leading to the expansion of oxygen minimum zones (OMZs) in the deep sea. In surface water, OMZs could have also been caused from the formation of strong thermoclines preventing oxygen inflow, and higher temperatures equated to higher productivity leading to higher oxygen usurpation. Further, expanding OMZs could have caused the proliferation of sulfate-reducing microorganisms which create highly toxic hydrogen sulfide H_{2}S as a waste product. During the event, the volume of sulfidic water may have been 10–20% of total ocean volume, in comparison to today's 1%. This may have also caused chemocline upwellings along continents and the dispersal of H_{2}S into the atmosphere. During the PETM there was a temporary dwarfing of mammals apparently caused by the upward excursion in temperature.

== Flora ==
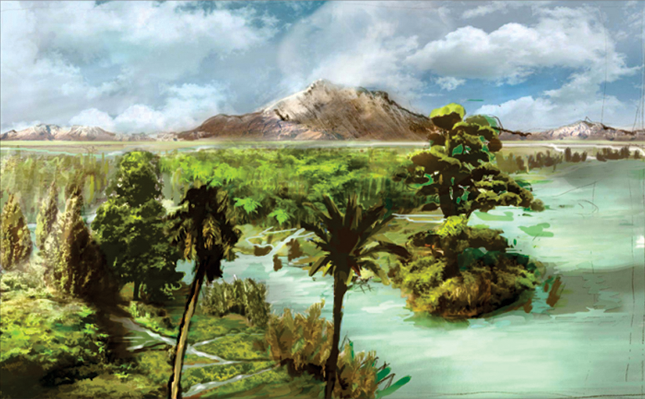
Restoration of a Patagonian landscape during the Danian

The warm, wet climate supported tropical and subtropical forests worldwide, mainly populated by conifers and broad-leafed trees. In Patagonia, the landscape supported tropical rainforests, cloud rainforests, mangrove forests, swamp forests, savannas, and sclerophyllous forests. In the Colombian Cerrejón Formation, fossil flora belong to the same families as modern day flora—such as palm trees, legumes, aroids, and malvales—and the same is true in the North Dakotan Almont/Beicegel Creek—such as Ochnaceae, Cyclocarya, and Ginkgo cranei—indicating the same floral families have characterized South American rainforests and the American Western Interior since the Paleocene.

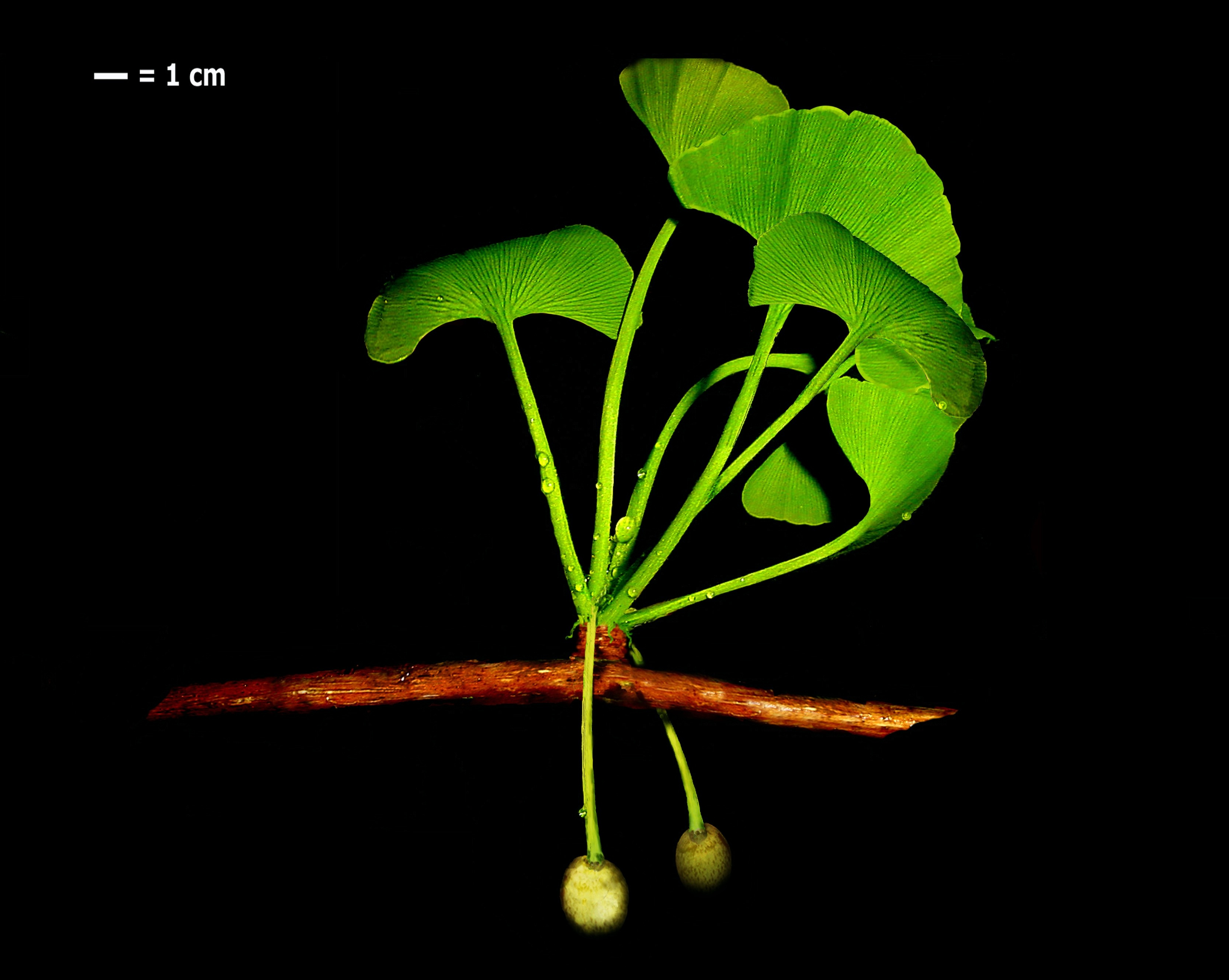
Reconstruction of the late Paleocene Ginkgo cranei

The extinction of large herbivorous dinosaurs may have allowed the forests to grow quite dense, and there is little evidence of wide open plains. Plants evolved several techniques to cope with high plant density, such as buttressing to better absorb nutrients and compete with other plants, increased height to reach sunlight, larger diaspore in seeds to provide added nutrition on the dark forest floor, and epiphytism where a plant grows on another plant in response to less space on the forest floor. Despite increasing density—which could act as fuel—wildfires decreased in frequency from the Cretaceous to the early Eocene as the atmospheric oxygen levels decreased to modern day levels, though they may have been more intense.

=== Recovery ===
There was a major die-off of plant species over the boundary; for example, in the Williston Basin of North Dakota, an estimated 1/3 to 3/5 of plant species went extinct. The K–Pg extinction event ushered in a floral turnover; for example, the once commonplace Araucariaceae conifers were almost fully replaced by Podocarpaceae conifers, and the Cheirolepidiaceae, a group of conifers that had dominated during most of the Mesozoic but had become rare during the Late Cretaceous became dominant trees in Patagonia, before going extinct. Some plant communities, such as those in eastern North America, were already experiencing an extinction event in the late Maastrichtian, particularly in the 1 million years before the K–Pg extinction event. The "disaster plants" that refilled the emptied landscape crowded out many Cretaceous plants, and resultantly, many went extinct by the middle Paleocene.

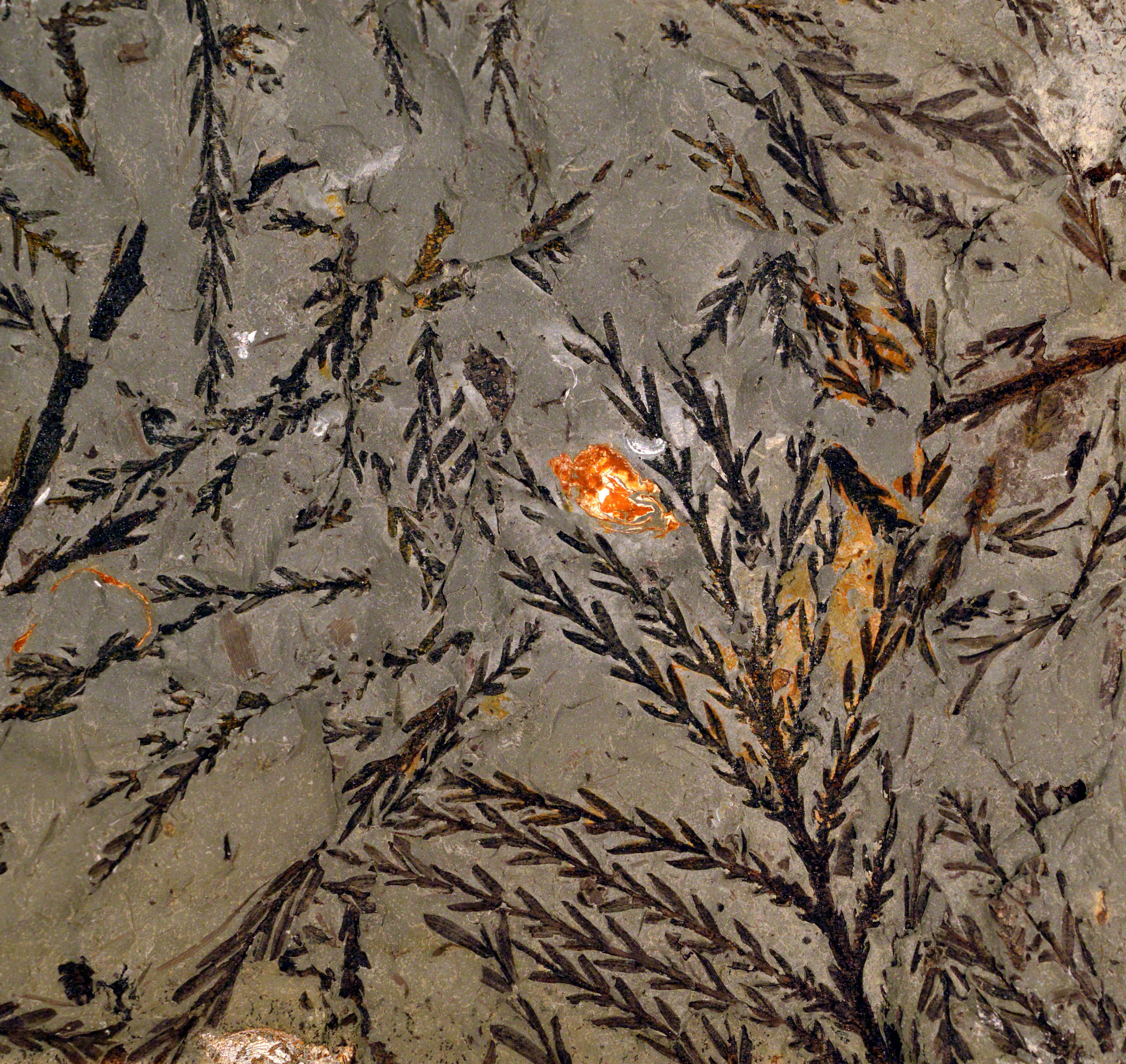
The conifer Glyptostrobus europaeus from the Canadian Paskapoo Formation

The strata immediately overlaying the K–Pg extinction event are especially rich in fern fossils. Ferns are often the first species to colonize areas damaged by forest fires, so this "fern spike" may mark the recovery of the biosphere following the impact (which caused blazing fires worldwide). The diversifying herb flora of the early Paleocene either represent pioneer species which re-colonized the recently emptied landscape, or a response to the increased amount of shade provided in a forested landscape. Lycopods, ferns, and angiosperm shrubs may have been important components of the Paleocene understory.

In general, the forests of the Paleocene were species-poor, and diversity did not fully recover until the end of the Paleocene. For example, the floral diversity of what is now the Holarctic region (comprising most of the Northern Hemisphere) was mainly early members of Ginkgo, Metasequoia, Glyptostrobus, Macginitiea, Platanus, Carya, Ampelopsis, and Cercidiphyllum. Patterns in plant recovery varied significantly with latitude, climate, and altitude. For example, what is now Castle Rock, Colorado featured a rich rainforest only 1.4 million years after the event, probably due to a rain shadow effect causing regular monsoon seasons. Conversely, low plant diversity and a lack of specialization in insects in the Colombian Cerrejón Formation, dated to 58 mya, indicates the ecosystem was still recovering from the K–Pg extinction event 7 million years later.

=== Angiosperms ===
Fossil Platanus fruit from the Canadian Paskapoo Formation

Flowering plants (angiosperms), which had become dominant among forest taxa by the middle Cretaceous 110–90 Ma, continued to develop and proliferate, more so to take advantage of the recently emptied niches and an increase in rainfall. Along with them coevolved the insects that fed on these plants and pollinated them. Predation by insects was especially high during the PETM. Many fruit-bearing plants appeared in the Paleocene in particular, probably to take advantage of the newly evolving birds and mammals for seed dispersal.

In what is now the Gulf Coast, angiosperm diversity increased slowly in the early Paleocene, and more rapidly in the middle and late Paleocene. This may have been because the effects of the K–Pg extinction event were still to some extent felt in the early Paleocene, the early Paleocene may not have had as many open niches, early angiosperms may not have been able to evolve at such an accelerated rate as later angiosperms, low diversity equates to lower evolution rates, or there was not much angiosperm migration into the region in the early Paleocene. Over the K–Pg extinction event, angiosperms had a higher extinction rate than gymnosperms (which include conifers, cycads, and relatives) and pteridophytes (ferns, horsetails, and relatives); zoophilous angiosperms (those that relied on animals for pollination) had a higher rate than anemophilous angiosperms; and evergreen angiosperms had a higher rate than deciduous angiosperms as deciduous plants can become dormant in harsh conditions.

In the Gulf Coast, angiosperms experienced another extinction event during the PETM, which they recovered quickly from in the Eocene through immigration from the Caribbean and Europe. During this time, the climate became warmer and wetter, and it is possible that angiosperms evolved to become stenotopic by this time, able to inhabit a narrow range of temperature and moisture; or, since the dominant floral ecosystem was a highly integrated and complex closed-canopy rainforest by the middle Paleocene, the plant ecosystems were more vulnerable to climate change. There is some evidence that, in the Gulf Coast, there was an extinction event in the late Paleocene preceding the PETM, which may have been due to the aforementioned vulnerability of complex rainforests, and the ecosystem may have been disrupted by only a small change in climate.

=== Polar forests ===
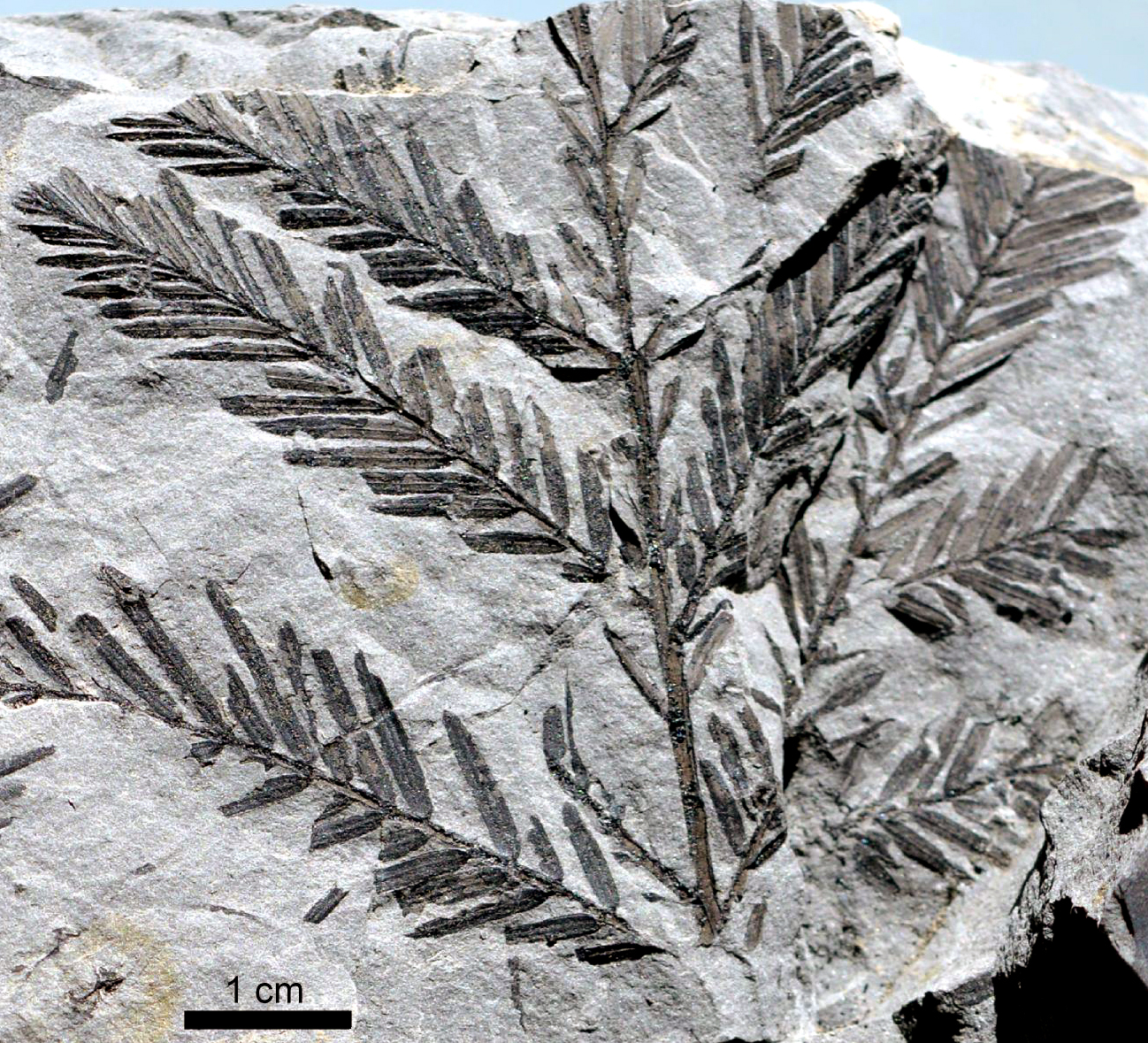
Metasequoia occidentalis from the Canadian Scollard Formation

The warm Paleocene climate, much like that of the Cretaceous, allowed for diverse polar forests. Whereas precipitation is a major factor in plant diversity nearer the equator, polar plants had to adapt to varying light availability (polar nights and midnight suns) and temperatures. Because of this, plants from both poles independently evolved some similar characteristics, such as broad leaves. Plant diversity at both poles increased throughout the Paleocene, especially at the end, in tandem with the increasing global temperature.

At the North Pole, woody angiosperms had become the dominant plants, a reversal from the Cretaceous where herbs proliferated. The Iceberg Bay Formation on Ellesmere Island, Nunavut (latitude 75–80° N) shows remains of a late Paleocene dawn redwood forest, the canopy reaching around 32 m (105 ft), and a climate similar to the Pacific Northwest. On the Alaska North Slope, Metasequoia was the dominant conifer. Much of the diversity represented migrants from nearer the equator. Deciduousness was dominant, probably to conserve energy by retroactively shedding leaves and retaining some energy rather than having them die from frostbite. In south-central Alaska, the Chickaloon Formation preserves peat-forming swamps dominated by taxodiaceous conifers and clastic floodplains occupied by angiosperm–conifer forests.

At the South Pole, due to the increasing isolation of Antarctica, many plant taxa were endemic to the continent instead of migrating down. Patagonian flora may have originated in Antarctica. The climate was much cooler than in the Late Cretaceous, though frost probably was not common in at least coastal areas. East Antarctica was likely warm and humid. Because of this, evergreen forests could proliferate as, in the absence of frost and a low probability of leaves dying, it was more energy efficient to retain leaves than to regrow them every year. One possibility is that the interior of the continent favored deciduous trees, though prevailing continental climates may have produced winters warm enough to support evergreen forests. As in the Cretaceous, podocarpaceous conifers, Nothofagus, and Proteaceae angiosperms were common.

== Fauna ==
In the K–Pg extinction event, every land animal over 25 kg (55 lb) was wiped out, leaving open several niches at the beginning of the epoch.

=== Mammals ===
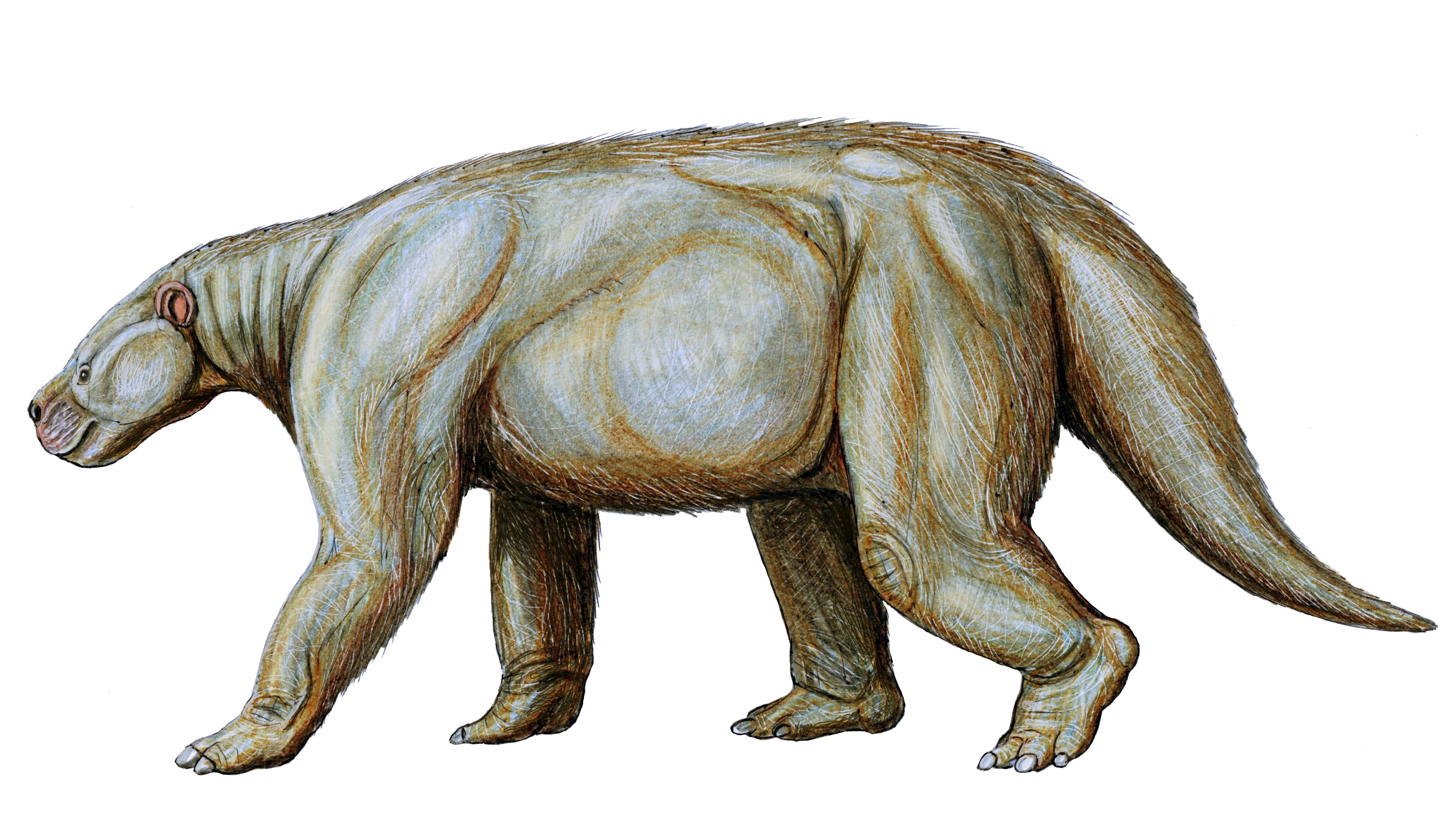
Restoration of the herbivorous late Paleocene pantodont Barylambda, which could have weighed up to 650 kg (1,430 lb)

Mammals had first appeared in the Late Triassic, and remained small and nocturnal throughout the Mesozoic to avoid competition with dinosaurs (nocturnal bottleneck), though, by the Middle Jurassic, they had branched out into several habitats—such as subterranean, arboreal, and aquatic— and the largest known Mesozoic mammal, Repenomamus robustus reached about 1 m (3 ft 3 in) in length and 12–14 kg (26–31 lb) in weight–comparable to the modern day Virginia opossum. Though some mammals could sporadically venture out in daytime (cathemerality) by roughly 10 million years before the K–Pg extinction event, they only became strictly diurnal (active in the daytime) sometime after.

In general, Paleocene mammals retained this small size until near the end of the epoch, and, consequently, early mammal bones are not well preserved in the fossil record, and most of what is known comes from fossil teeth. Multituberculates, a now-extinct rodent-like group not closely related to any modern mammal, were the most successful group of mammals in the Mesozoic, and they reached peak diversity in the early Paleocene. During this time, multituberculate taxa had a wide range of dental complexity, which correlates to a broader range in diet for the group as a whole. Multituberculates declined in the late Paleocene and went extinct at the end of the Eocene, possibly due to competition from newly evolving rodents.

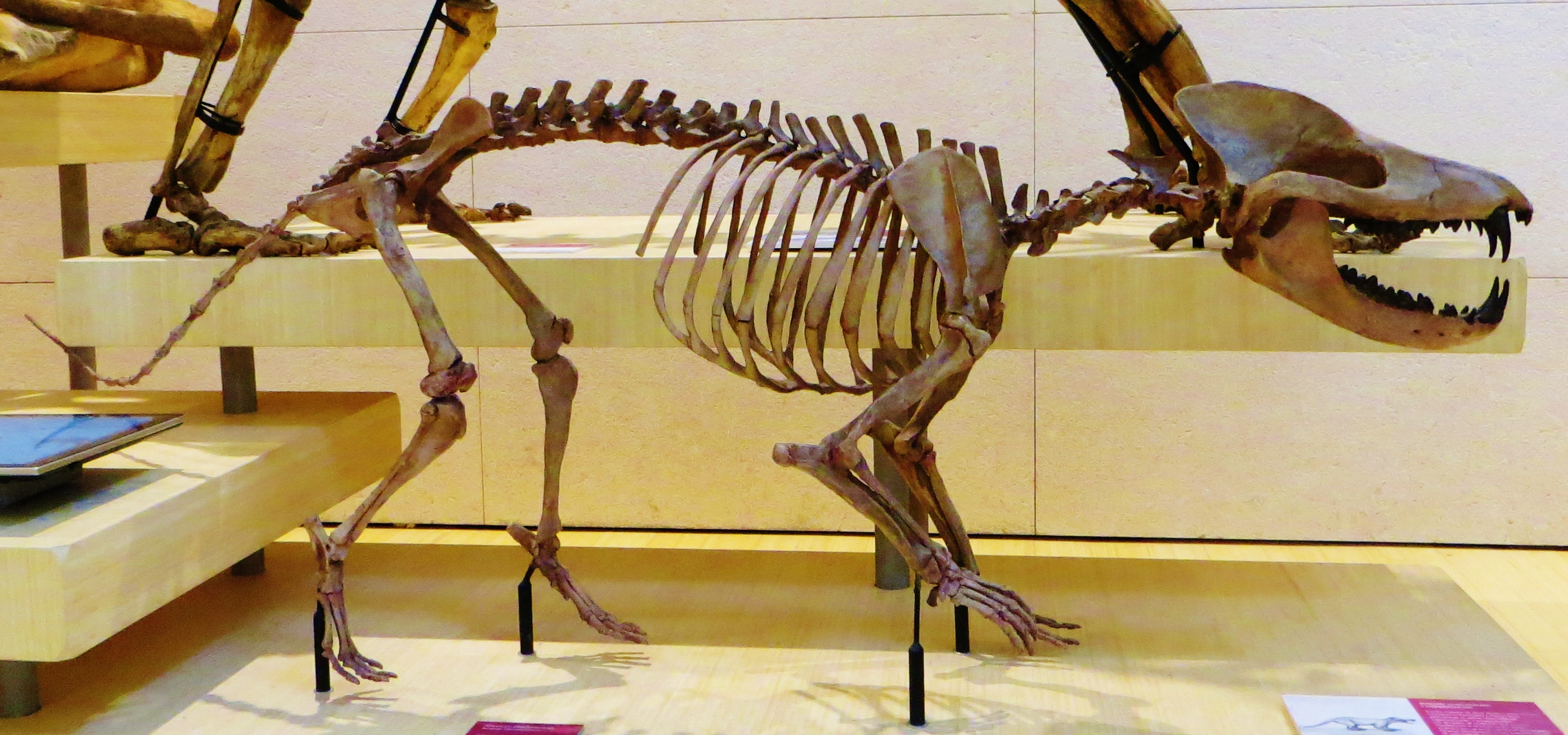
The mesonychid Sinonyx at the Museo delle Scienze

Nonetheless, following the K–Pg extinction event, mammals very quickly diversified and filled the empty niches. Mammal richness during this epoch, in contrast to the present day, varied insignificantly with latitude. Modern mammals are subdivided into therians (modern members are placentals and marsupials) and monotremes. These three groups all originated in the Cretaceous. Paleocene marsupials include Peradectes, and monotremes Monotrematum. The epoch featured the rise of many crown placental groups—groups that have living members in modern day—such as the earliest afrotherian Ocepeia, xenarthran Utaetus, rodent Tribosphenomys and Paramys, the forerunners of primates the Plesiadapiformes, earliest carnivorans Ravenictis and Pristinictis, possible pangolins Palaeanodonta, possible forerunners of odd-toed ungulates Phenacodontidae, and eulipotyphlans Nyctitheriidae. Though therian mammals had probably already begun to diversify around 10 to 20 million years before the K–Pg extinction event, average mammal size increased greatly after the boundary, and a radiation into frugivory (fruit-eating) and omnivory began, namely with the newly evolving large herbivores such as the Taeniodonta, Tillodonta, Pantodonta, Polydolopimorphia, and the Dinocerata. Large carnivores include the wolf-like Mesonychia, such as Ankalagon and Sinonyx.

Though there was an explosive diversification, the affinities of most Paleocene mammals are unknown, and only primates, carnivorans, and rodents have unambiguous Paleocene origins, resulting in a 10 million year gap in the fossil record of other mammalian crown orders. The most species-rich order of Paleocene mammals is Condylarthra, which is a wastebasket taxon for miscellaneous bunodont hoofed mammals. Other ambiguous orders include the Leptictida, Cimolesta, and Creodonta. This uncertainty blurs the early evolution of placentals.

==== Land mammal ages ====
Cenozoic mammal faunas are often described using biochronological or biostratigraphic systems, which arrange rock strata or intervals of time based on distinctive fossil assemblages or the evolution of new mammal species. Apart from Australia and Antarctica (which lack Paleocene mammal fossils), each continent has a unique series of Cenozoic land mammal ages (LMAs) overprinted on the global geological time scale. These different land mammal ages are listed in the following table, which shows rough correlations to each other and the three global ages/stages of the Paleocene:

Global age	NALMA (North America)	SALMA (South America)	ELMA / MP (Europe)	ALMA (Asia)	AFLMA (Africa)
Thanetian	Clarkforkian		MP 6b	Gashatan	Tingitanian
Thanetian	Tiffanian		Cernaysian (MP 6a)	Gashatan	Tingitanian
Thanetian	Tiffanian		Cernaysian (MP 6a)	Nongshanian	Tingitanian
Selandian	Tiffanian		MP 1-5	Nongshanian	Tingitanian
Danian	Torrejonian	"Carodnia zone" (?)	MP 1-5	Shanghuan	
Danian	Torrejonian	Peligran (?)	MP 1-5	Shanghuan	
Danian	Puercan	Peligran (?)	MP 1-5	Shanghuan	
Danian	Puercan	Tiupampan	MP 1-5	Shanghuan	

=== Birds ===
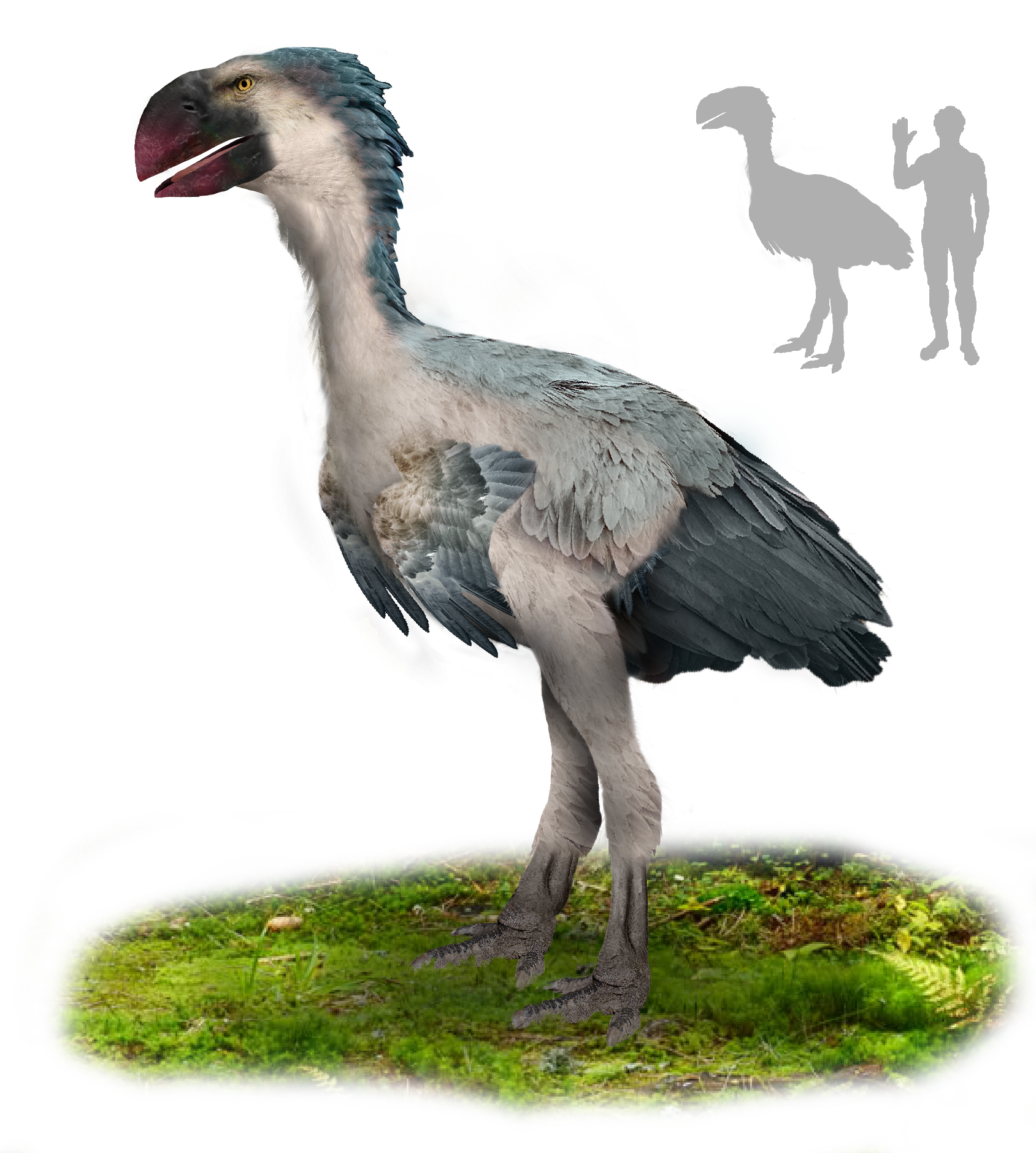
Gastornis restoration

According to DNA studies, modern birds (Neornithes) rapidly diversified following the extinction of the other dinosaurs in the Paleocene, and nearly all modern bird lineages can trace their origins to this epoch with the exception of fowl and palaeognaths. This was one of the fastest diversifications of any group, probably fueled by the diversification of fruit-bearing trees and associated insects, and the modern bird groups had likely already diverged within four million years of the K–Pg extinction event. However, the fossil record of birds in the Paleocene is rather poor compared to other groups, limited globally to mainly waterbirds such as the early penguin Waimanu. The earliest arboreal crown group bird known is Tsidiiyazhi, a mousebird dating to around 62 Ma. The fossil record also includes early owls such as the large Berruornis from France, and the smaller Ogygoptynx from the United States.

Almost all archaic birds (any bird outside Neornithes) went extinct during the K–Pg extinction event, although the archaic Qinornis is recorded in the Paleocene. Their extinction may have led to the proliferation of neornithine birds in the Paleocene, and the only known Cretaceous neornithine birds are the waterbird Vegavis, the fowl relative Asteriornis, and possibly also the waterbird Teviornis.

In the Mesozoic, birds and pterosaurs exhibited size-related niche partitioning – no known Late Cretaceous flying bird had a wingspan greater than 2 m (6 ft 7 in) nor exceeded a weight of 5 kg (11 lb), whereas contemporary pterosaurs ranged from 2–10 m (6 ft 7 in – 32 ft 10 in), probably to avoid competition. Their extinction allowed flying birds to attain greater size, such as pelagornithids and pelecaniformes. The Paleocene pelagornithid Protodontopteryx was quite small compared to later members, with a wingspan of about 1 m (3.3 ft), comparable to a gull. On the archipelago-continent of Europe, the flightless bird Gastornis was the largest herbivore at 2 m (6 ft 7 in) tall for the largest species, possibly due to lack of competition from newly emerging large mammalian herbivores which were prevalent on the other continents. The carnivorous terror birds in South America have a contentious appearance in the Paleocene with Paleopsilopterus, though the first definitive appearance is in the Eocene.

=== Reptiles ===
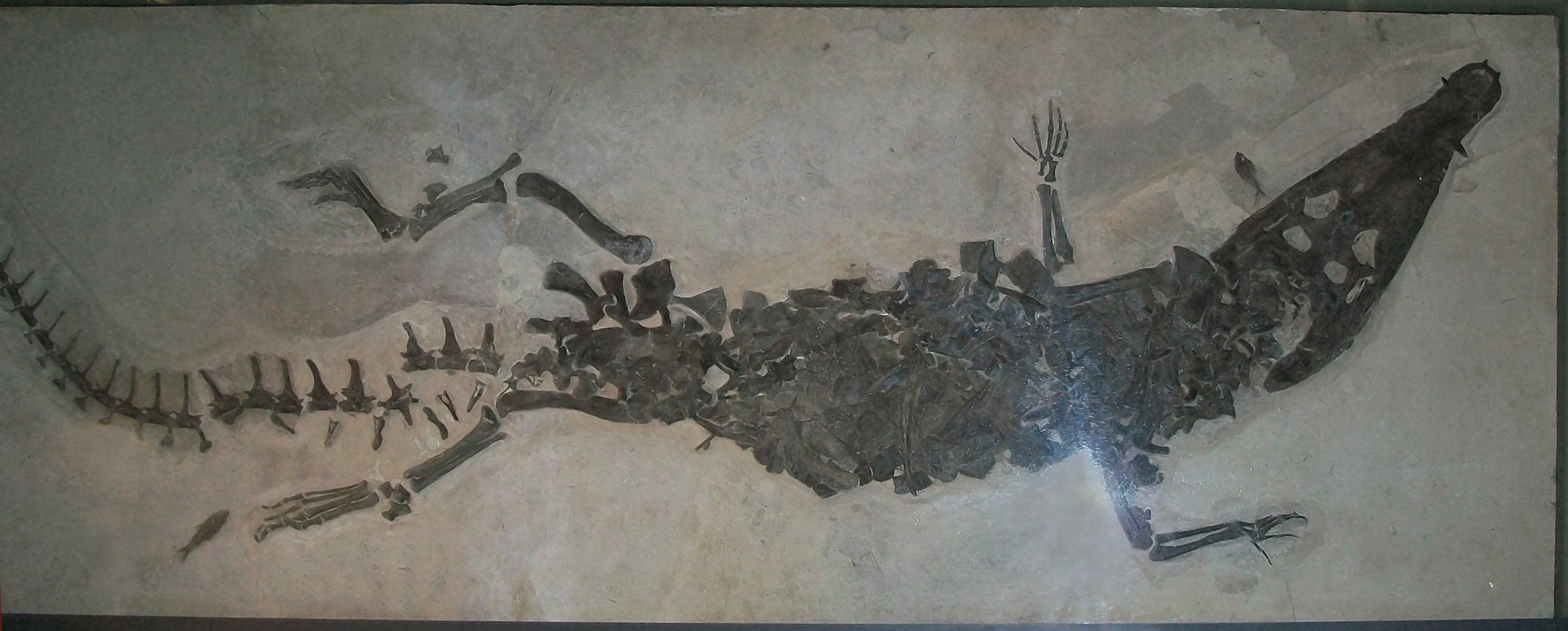
Borealosuchus at the Field Museum of Natural History

It is generally believed all non-avian dinosaurs went extinct at the K–Pg extinction event 66 Ma, though there are a couple of controversial claims of Paleocene dinosaurs which would indicate a gradual decline of dinosaurs. Contentious dates include remains from the Hell Creek Formation dated 40,000 years after the boundary, and a hadrosaur femur from the San Juan Basin dated to 64.5 Ma, but such stray late forms may be zombie taxa that were washed out and moved to younger sediments.

In the wake of the K–Pg extinction event, 83% of lizard and snake (squamate) species went extinct, and the diversity did not fully recover until the end of the Paleocene. However, since the only major squamate lineages to disappear in the event were the mosasaurs and polyglyphanodontians (the latter making up 40% of Maastrichtian lizard diversity), and most major squamate groups had evolved by the Cretaceous, the event probably did not greatly affect squamate evolution, and newly evolving squamates did not seemingly branch out into new niches as mammals. That is, Cretaceous and Paleogene squamates filled the same niches. Nonetheless, there was a faunal turnover of squamates, and groups that were dominant by the Eocene were not as abundant in the Cretaceous, namely the anguids, iguanas, night lizards, pythons, colubrids, boas, and worm lizards. Only small squamates are known from the early Paleocene—the largest snake Helagras was 95 cm (37 in) in length—but the late Paleocene snake Titanoboa grew to over 13 m (43 ft) long, the longest snake ever recorded. Kawasphenodon peligrensis from the early Paleocene of South America represents the youngest record of Rhynchocephalia outside of New Zealand, where the only extant representative of the order, the tuatara, resides.

Freshwater crocodilians and choristoderans were among the aquatic reptiles to have survived the K–Pg extinction event, probably because freshwater environments were not as impacted as marine ones. One example of a Paleocene crocodile is Borealosuchus, which averaged 3.7 m (12 ft) in length at the Wannagan Creek site. Among crocodyliformes, the aquatic and terrestrial dyrosaurs and the fully terrestrial sebecids would also survive the K-Pg extinction event, and a late surviving member of Pholidosauridae is also known from the Danian of Morocco. Three choristoderans are known from the Paleocene: The gharial-like neochoristoderans Champsosaurus—the largest is the Paleocene C. gigas at 3 m (9.8 ft), Simoedosaurus—the largest specimen measuring 5 m (16 ft), and an indeterminate species of the lizard like non-neochoristoderan Lazarussuchus around 44 centimetres in length. The last known choristoderes, belonging to the genus Lazarussuchus, are known from the Miocene.

Turtles experienced a decline in the Campanian (Late Cretaceous) during a cooling event, and recovered during the PETM at the end of the Paleocene. Turtles were not greatly affected by the K–Pg extinction event, and around 80% of species survived. In Colombia, a 60 million year old turtle with a 1.7 m (5 ft 7 in) carapace, Carbonemys, was discovered.

=== Amphibians ===
There is little evidence amphibians were affected very much by the K–Pg extinction event, probably because the freshwater habitats they inhabited were not as greatly impacted as marine environments. In the Hell Creek Formation of eastern Montana, a 1990 study found no extinction in amphibian species across the boundary. The true toads evolved during the Paleocene. The final record of albanerpetontids from North America and outside of Europe and Anatolia, an unnamed species of Albanerpeton, is known from the Paleocene aged Paskapoo Formation in Canada.

=== Fish ===
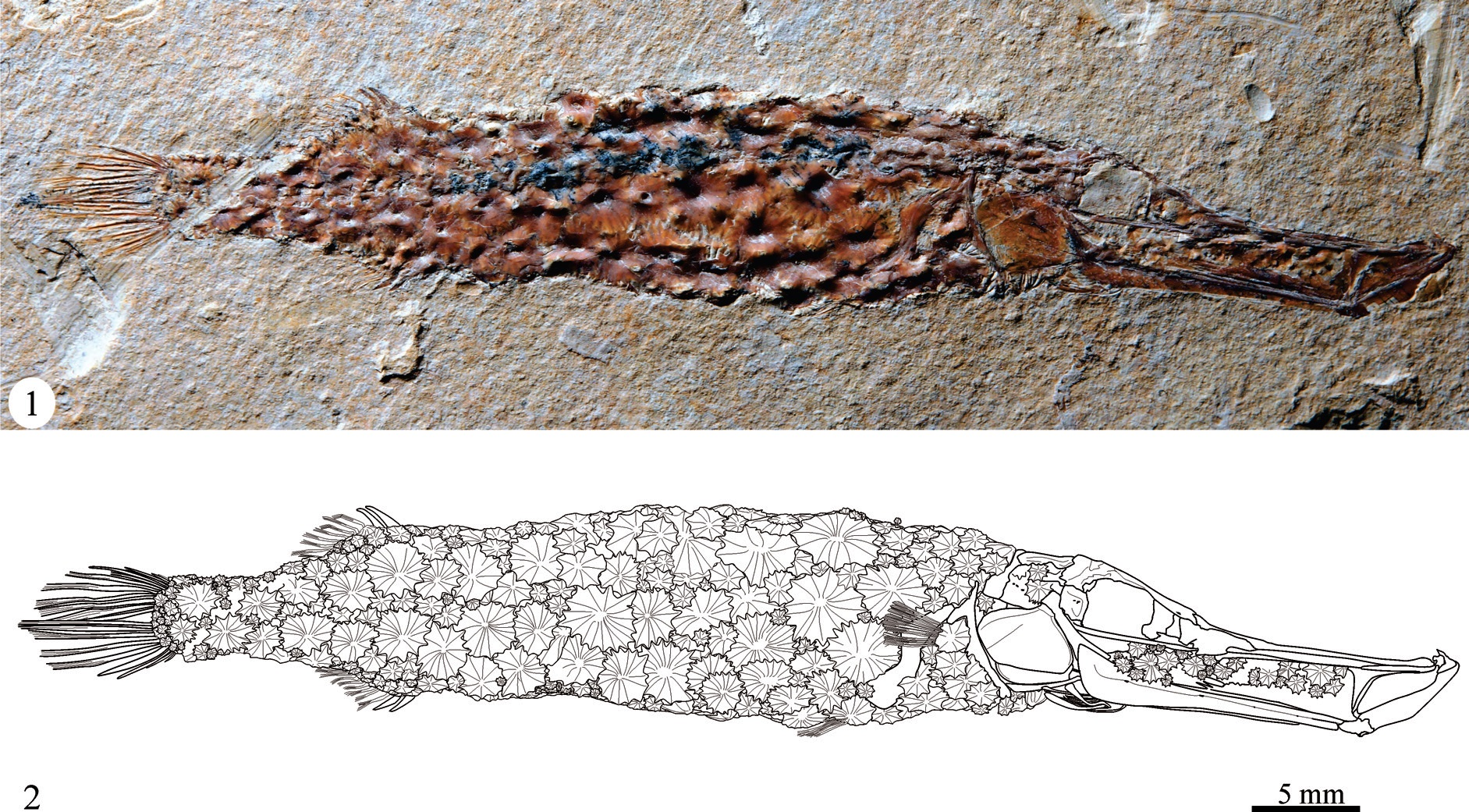
The early Paleocene trumpetfish Eekaulostomus from Palenque, Mexico

The small pelagic fish population recovered rather quickly, and there was a low extinction rate for sharks and rays. Overall, only 12% of fish species went extinct. During the Cretaceous, fishes were not very abundant, probably due to heightened predation by or competition with ammonites and squid, although large predatory fish did exist, including ichthyodectids, pachycormids and pachyrhizodontids. Almost immediately following the K–Pg extinction event, ray-finned fish — today, representing nearly half of all vertebrate taxa – became much more numerous and increased in size, and rose to dominate the open-oceans. Acanthomorphs—a group of ray-finned fish which, today, represent a third of all vertebrate life—experienced a massive diversification following the K–Pg extinction event, dominating marine ecosystems by the end of the Paleocene, refilling vacant, open-ocean predatory niches as well as spreading out into recovering reef systems. In specific, percomorphs diversified faster than any other vertebrate group at the time, with the exception of birds; Cretaceous percomorphs varied very little in body plan, whereas, by the Eocene, percomorphs evolved into vastly varying creatures such as early scombrids (today, tuna, mackerels, and bonitos), barracudas, jacks, billfish, flatfishes, and aulostomoid (trumpetfish and cornetfish). However, the discovery of the Cretaceous cusk eel Pastorius shows that the body plans of at least some percomorphs were already highly variable, perhaps indicating an already diverse array of percomorph body plans before the Paleocene.

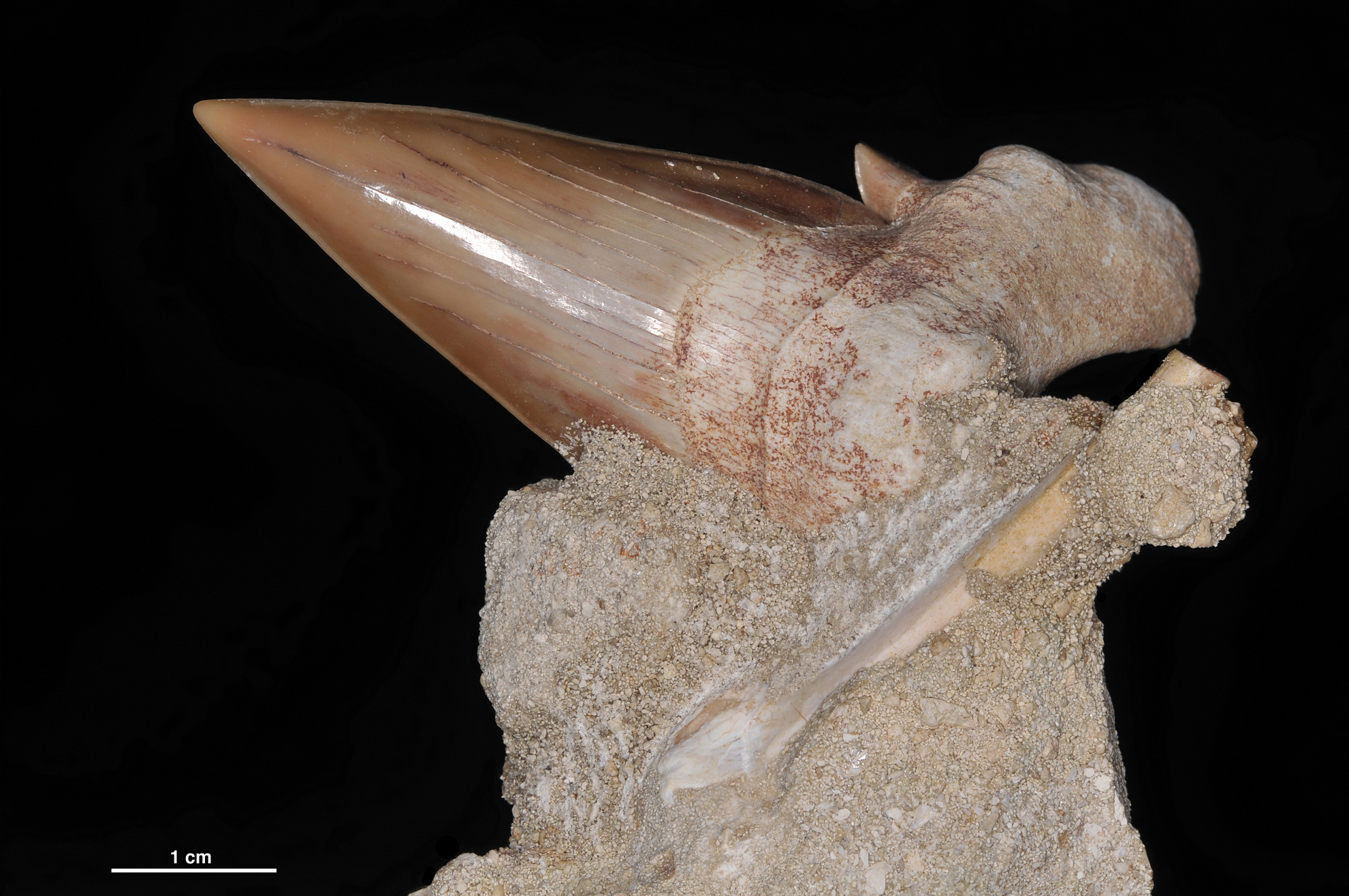
Otodus obliquus shark tooth from Oued Zem, Morocco

Conversely, sharks and rays appear to have been unable to exploit the vacant niches, and recovered the same pre-extinction abundance. There was a faunal turnover of sharks from mackerel sharks to ground sharks, as ground sharks are more suited to hunting the rapidly diversifying ray-finned fish whereas mackerel sharks target larger prey. The first megatoothed shark, Otodus obliquus—the ancestor of the giant megalodon—is recorded from the Paleocene.

Several Paleocene freshwater fish are recorded from North America, including bowfins, gars, arowanas, Gonorynchidae, common catfish, smelts, and pike.

=== Insects and arachnids ===
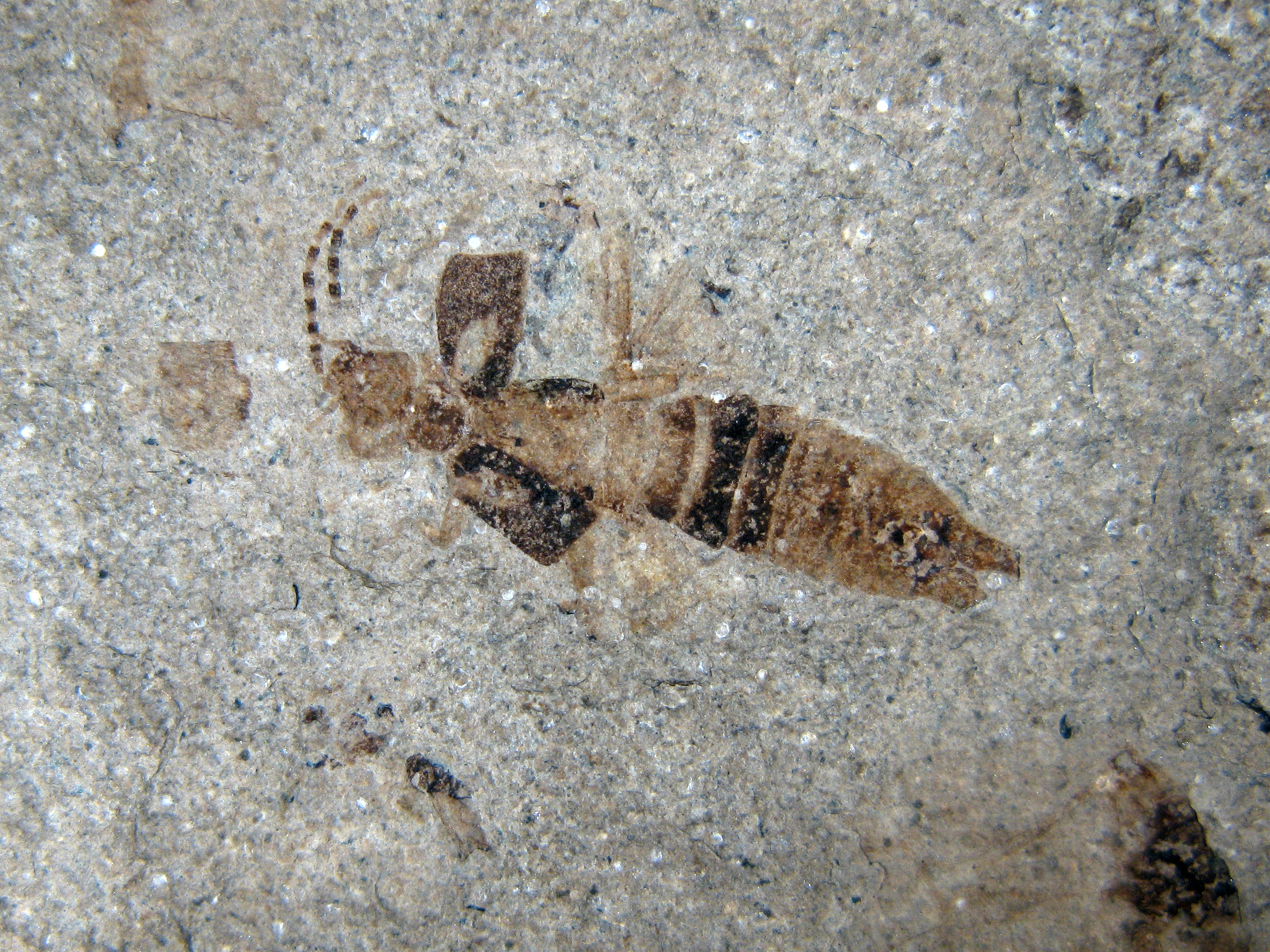
Earwig from the late Paleocene Danish Fur Formation

Insect recovery varied from place to place. For example, it may have taken until the PETM for insect diversity to recover in the western interior of North America, whereas Patagonian insect diversity had recovered by four million years after the K–Pg extinction event. In some areas, such as the Bighorn Basin in Wyoming, there is a dramatic increase in plant predation during the PETM, although this is probably not indicative of a diversification event in insects due to rising temperatures because plant predation decreases following the PETM. More likely, insects followed their host plant or plants which were expanding into mid-latitude regions during the PETM, and then retreated afterward.

The middle-to-late Paleocene French Menat Formation shows an abundance of beetles (making up 77.5% of the insect diversity)—especially weevils (50% of diversity), jewel beetles, leaf beetles, and reticulated beetles—as well as other true bugs—such as pond skaters—and cockroaches. To a lesser degree, there are also orthopterans, hymenopterans, butterflies, and flies, though planthoppers were more common than flies. Representing less than 1% of fossil remains dragonflies, caddisflies, mayflies, earwigs, mantises, net-winged insects, and possibly termites.

The Wyoming Hanna Formation is the only known Paleocene formation to produce sizable pieces of amber, as opposed to only small droplets. The amber was formed by a single or a closely related group of either taxodiaceaen or pine tree(s) which produced cones similar to those of dammaras. Only one insect, a thrips, has been identified.

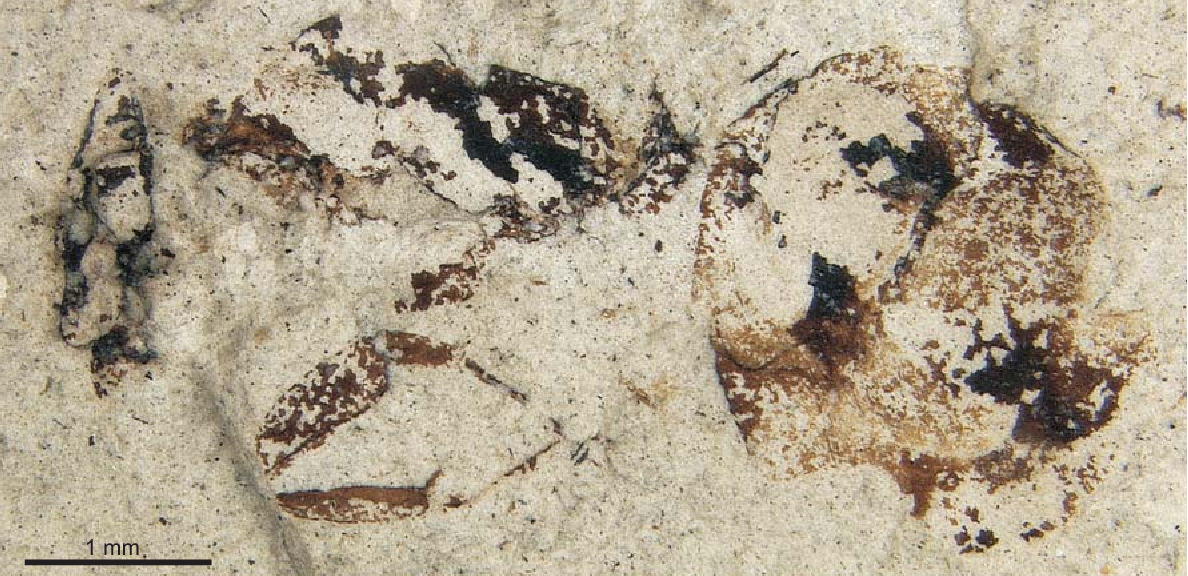
The ant Napakimyrma paskapooensis from the Canadian Paskapoo Formation

There is a gap in the ant fossil record from 78 to 55 Ma, except for the aneuretine Napakimyrma paskapooensis from the 62–56 Ma Canadian Paskapoo Formation. Given high abundance in the Eocene, two of the modern dominant ant subfamilies—Ponerinae and Myrmicinae—likely originated and greatly diversified in the Paleocene, acting as major hunters of arthropods, and probably competed with each other for food and nesting grounds in the dense angiosperm leaf litter. Myrmicines expanded their diets to seeds and formed trophobiotic symbiotic relationships with aphids, mealybugs, treehoppers, and other honeydew secreting insects which were also successful in angiosperm forests, allowing them to invade other biomes, such as the canopy or temperate environments, and achieve a worldwide distribution by the middle Eocene.

About 80% of the butterfly and moth (lepidopteran) fossil record occurs in the early Paleogene, specifically the late Paleocene and the middle-to-late Eocene. Most Paleocene lepidopteran compression fossils come from the Danish Fur Formation. Though there is low family-level diversity in the Paleocene compared to later epochs, this may be due to a largely incomplete fossil record. The evolution of bats had a profound effect on lepidopterans, which feature several anti-predator adaptations such as echolocation jamming and the ability to detect bat signals.

Bees were likely heavily impacted by the K–Pg extinction event and a die-off of flowering plants, though the bee fossil record is very limited. The oldest kleptoparasitic bee, Paleoepeolus, is known from the Paleocene 60 Ma.

Though the Eocene features, by far, the highest proportion of known fossil spider species, the Paleocene spider assemblage is quite low. Some spider groups began to diversify around the PETM, such as jumping spiders, and possibly coelotine spiders (members of the funnel weaver family).

The diversification of mammals had a profound effect on parasitic insects, namely the evolution of bats, which have more ectoparasites than any other known mammal or bird. The PETM's effect on mammals greatly impacted the evolution of fleas, ticks, and oestroids.

=== Marine invertebrates ===
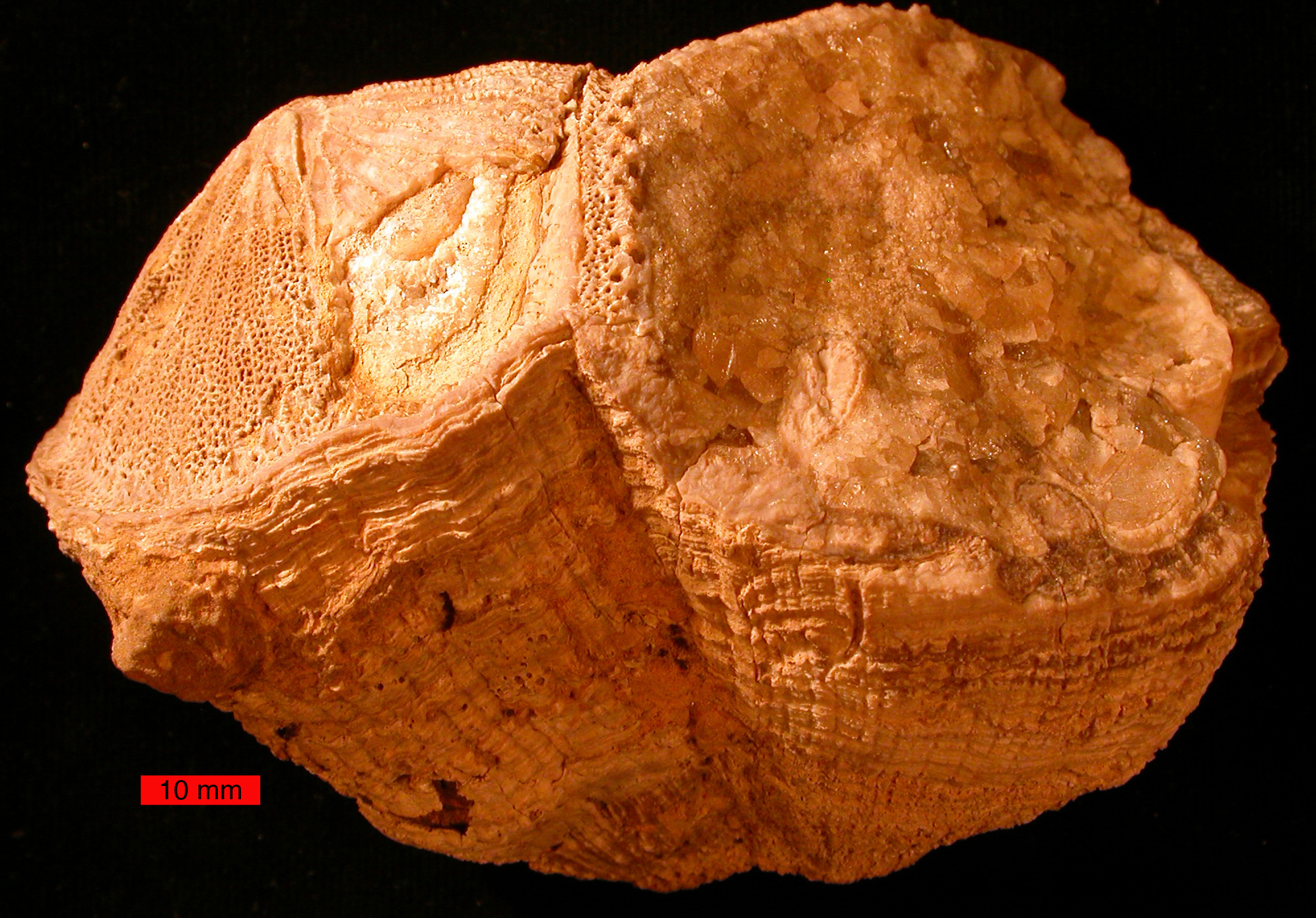
A rudist, the dominant reef-building organism of the Cretaceous

Among marine invertebrates, plankton and those with a planktonic stage in their development (meroplankton) were most impacted by the K–Pg extinction event, and plankton populations crashed. Nearly 90% of all calcifying plankton species perished. This reverberated up and caused a global marine food chain collapse, namely with the extinction of ammonites and large raptorial marine reptiles. Nonetheless, the rapid diversification of large fish species indicates a healthy plankton population through the Paleocene.

Marine invertebrate diversity may have taken about 7 million years to recover, though this may be a preservation artifact as anything smaller than 5 mm (0.20 in) is unlikely to be fossilized, and body size may have simply decreased across the boundary. A 2019 study found that in Seymour Island, Antarctica, the marine life assemblage consisted primarily of burrowing creatures—such as burrowing clams and snails—for around 320,000 years after the K–Pg extinction event, and it took around a million years for the marine diversity to return to previous levels. Areas closer to the equator may have been more affected. Sand dollars first evolved in the late Paleocene. The Late Cretaceous decapod crustacean assemblage of James Ross Island appears to have been mainly pioneer species and the ancestors of modern fauna, such as the first Antarctic crabs and the first appearance of the lobsters of the genera Linuparus, Metanephrops, and Munidopsis which still inhabit Antarctica today.

In the Cretaceous, the main reef-building creatures were the box-like bivalve rudists instead of coral—though a diverse Cretaceous coral assemblage did exist—and rudists had collapsed by the time of the K–Pg extinction event. Some corals are known to have survived in higher latitudes in the Late Cretaceous and into the Paleogene, and hard coral-dominated reefs may have recovered by 8 million years after the K–Pg extinction event, though the coral fossil record of this time is rather sparse. Though there was a lack of extensive coral reefs in the Paleocene, there were some colonies—mainly dominated by zooxanthellate corals—in shallow coastal (neritic) areas. Starting in the latest Cretaceous and continuing until the early Eocene, calcareous corals rapidly diversified. Corals probably competed mainly with red and coralline algae for space on the seafloor. Calcified dasycladalean green algae experienced the greatest diversity in their evolutionary history in the Paleocene. Though coral reef ecosystems do not become particularly abundant in the fossil record until the Miocene (possibly due to preservation bias), strong Paleocene coral reefs have been identified in what are now the Pyrenees (emerging as early as 63 Ma), with some smaller Paleocene coral reefs identified across the Mediterranean region.

== See also ==
- Moeraki Boulders
