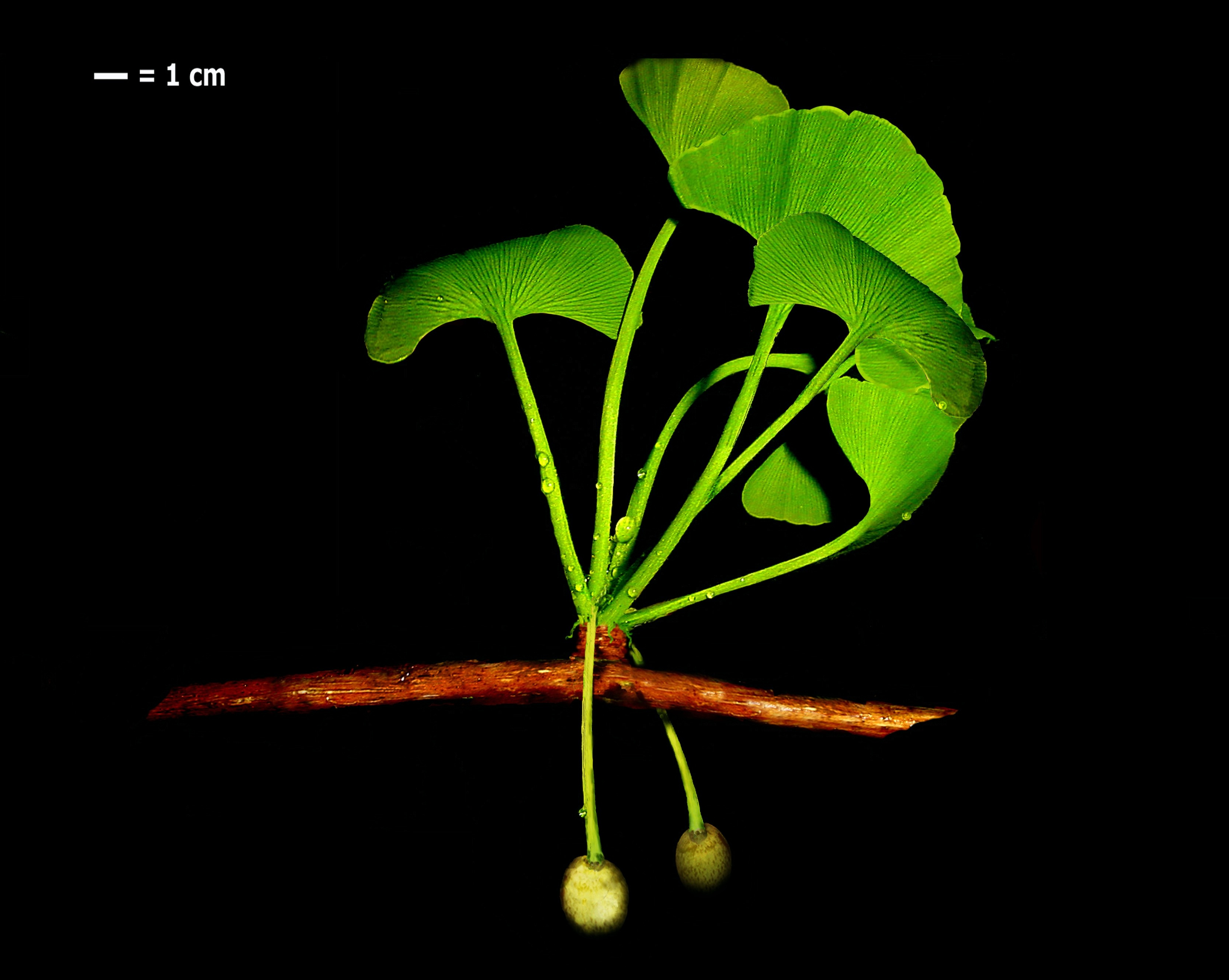
- Reconstruction of Ginkgo cranei by B.M. Begović Bego and Z. Zhou, 2012

Scientific classification
- Kingdom: Plantae
- Clade: Tracheophytes
- Clade: Gymnosperms
- Division: Ginkgophyta
- Class: Ginkgoopsida
- Order: Ginkgoales
- Family: Ginkgoaceae
- Genus: Ginkgo
- Species: †G. cranei

Binomial name
- †Ginkgo cranei Zhou, Quan, & Liu, 2012

= Ginkgo cranei =

Ginkgo cranei Temporal range: Late Paleocene

Extinct species of tree

Ginkgo cranei is an extinct Ginkgo species in the family Ginkgoaceae described from a series of isolated fossil ovulate organs and leaves. The species is known from upper Paleocene sediments exposed in the state of North Dakota, US. It is the first Ginkgo species to be described from Paleogene period with reproductive structures.

== History and classification ==
Ginkgo cranei is represented by a group of fossil specimens from the Upper Paleocene aged Sentinel Butte Formation exposed near the town of Almont, North Dakota. The specimens are preserved in a fine-grained yellow- to brown-colored shale with a notably high iron content. Fossils found in the shales are often three-dimensionally preserved with stem and seed structure intact. The age of the formation is based on the recovery of late Tiffanian mammals in the upper section of the formation along with the floral and palynological assemblages of the formation. Many of the G. cranei seeds are preserved as casts with hollow crystalline interiors and exterior cuticle present. Associated with the ovulate organs are fossil leaves that were formerly assigned to the taxon Ginkgo adiantoides.

The type specimens for G. cranei include two ovulate organ fossils, a holotype and a paratype. The holotype is numbered number UWSP42706 which, along with four other specimens, is currently preserved in the paleobotanical collections of University of Wisconsin–Stevens Point in Stevens Point, Wisconsin. The paratype, number PP34187, along with one additional specimen, are part of the geology collections maintained at the Field Museum of Natural History in Chicago, Illinois. A total of only seven G. cranei ovulate organ fossils were known at the time of the species description. The specimens were studied by paleobotanist Zhiyan Zhou of Nanjing University, Cheng Quan of Jilin University and Yu-Sheng (Christopher) Liu of East Tennessee State University. Zhou and associates published their 2012 type description for G. cranei in the International Journal of Plant Sciences. The chosen specific name cranei was in honor of Sir Peter Crane who, with Steven Manchester and David Dilcher, first discovered the Almont Ginkgo fossils.

== Description ==
G. cranei ovulate organs are noted for the presence of distinct epidermal cells that have thick, dome-like periclinal walls. Overall the ovulate organs range from 10–19 millimetres (0.39–0.75 in) by 12–17 millimetres (1.2–1.7 cm). Both the size and cell structuring is different from the living Ginkgo biloba ovulate organs, which are larger at 30 by 20 millimetres (1.18 by 0.79 in) and have less bulging periclinal walls. The stomata complexes found on G cranei ovulate organs and leaves are sparser in distribution and fewer in total number than the complexes on G. biloba.
