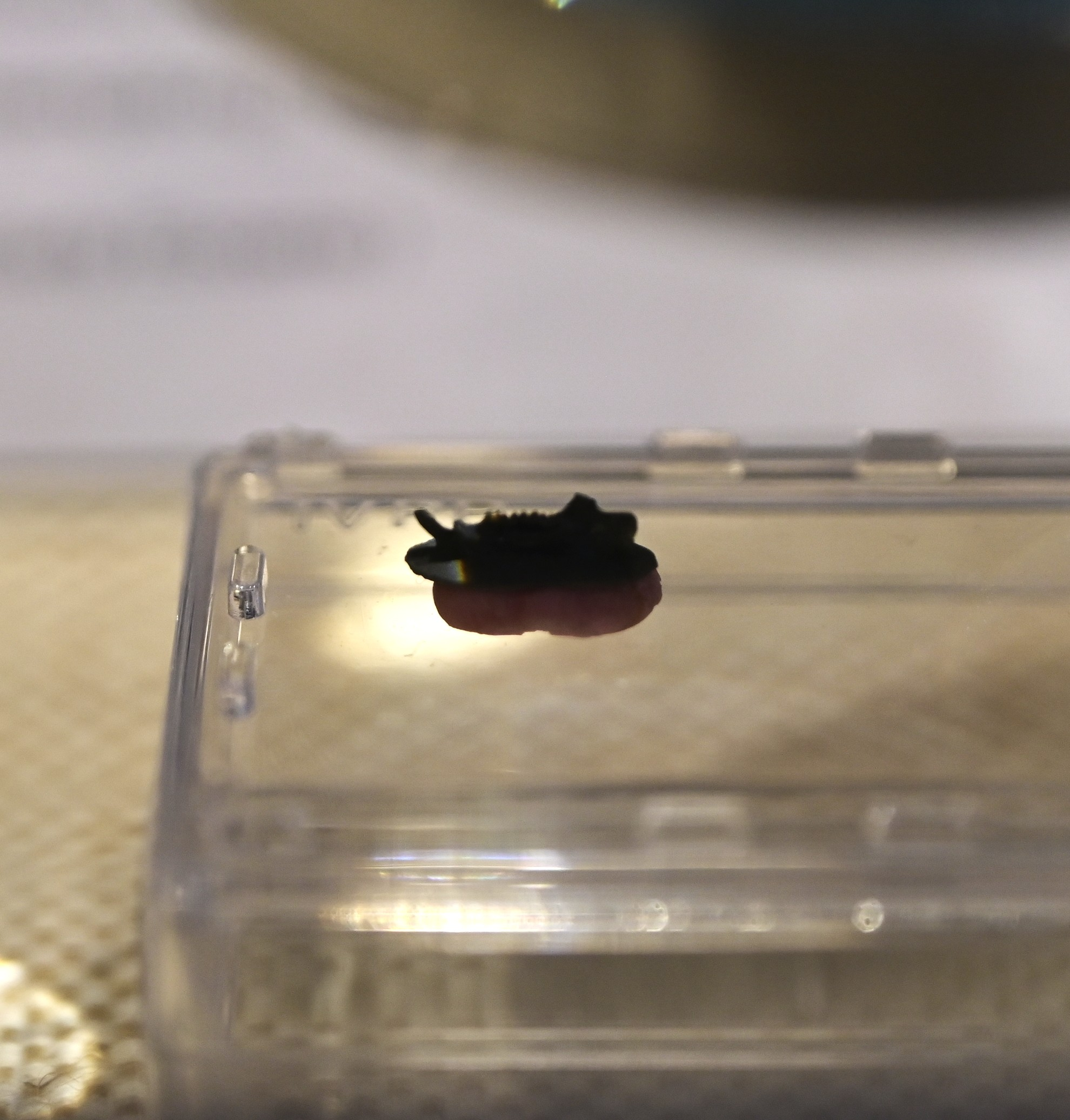
- Holotype of T. minutus (IVPP V10775), Paleozoological Museum of China

Scientific classification
- Kingdom: Animalia
- Phylum: Chordata
- Class: Mammalia
- Infraclass: Placentalia
- Order: Rodentia
- Family: †Alagomyidae
- Genus: †Tribosphenomys; Meng et al., 1994

Species
- †Tribosphenomys minutus Meng, 1994; †Tribosphenomys secundus Lopatin and Averianov, 2004

= Tribosphenomys =

Tribosphenomys Temporal range: Late Palaeocene

Extinct genus of rodents

Tribosphenomys is an extinct genus of alagomyid rodent that lived during Late Paleocene of Northern China and Mongolia.

== Description ==
The molars of Tribosphenomys lack metalophids and have columnar, well separated cusps.
