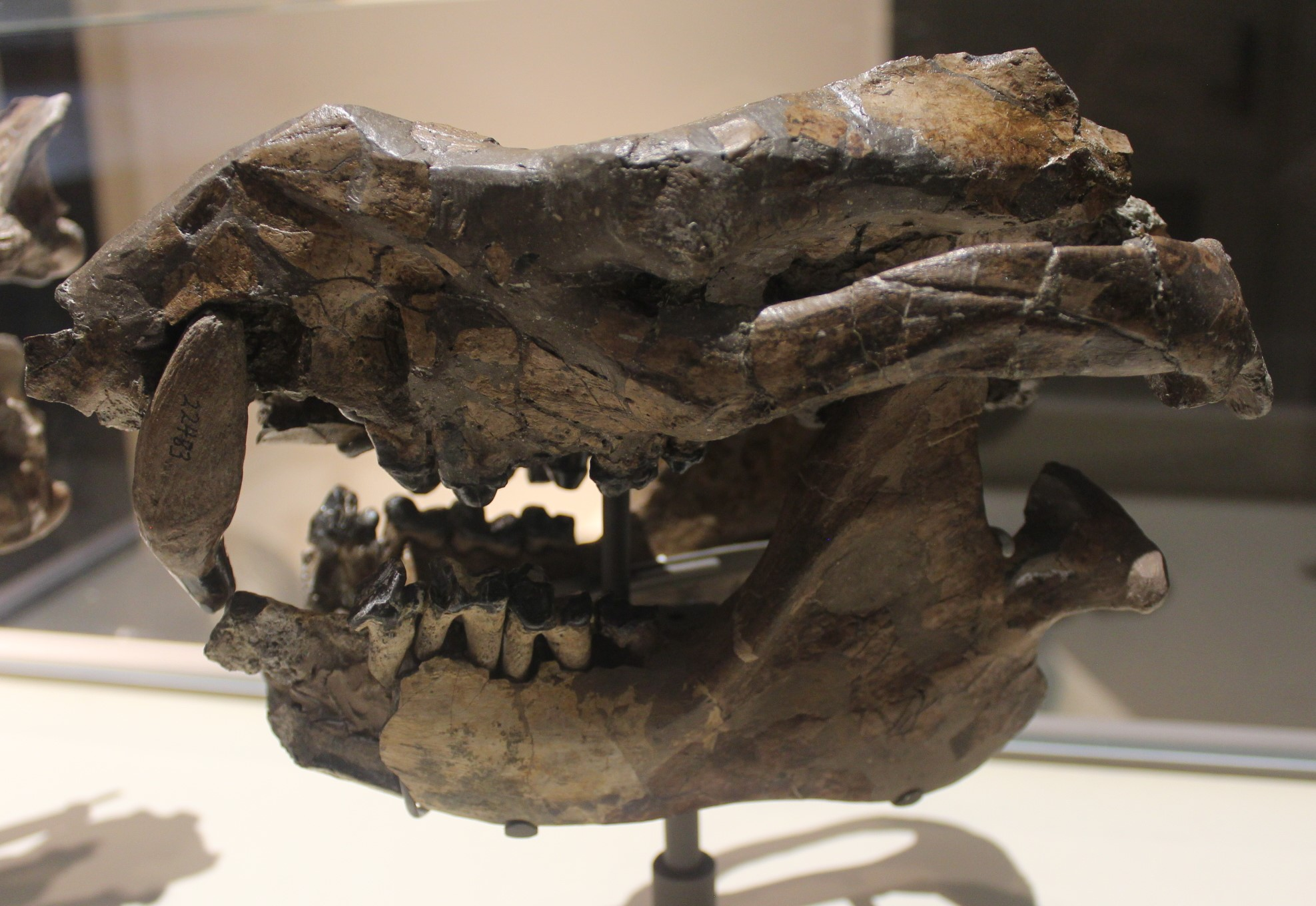
- T. quivirensis skull, National Museum of Natural History
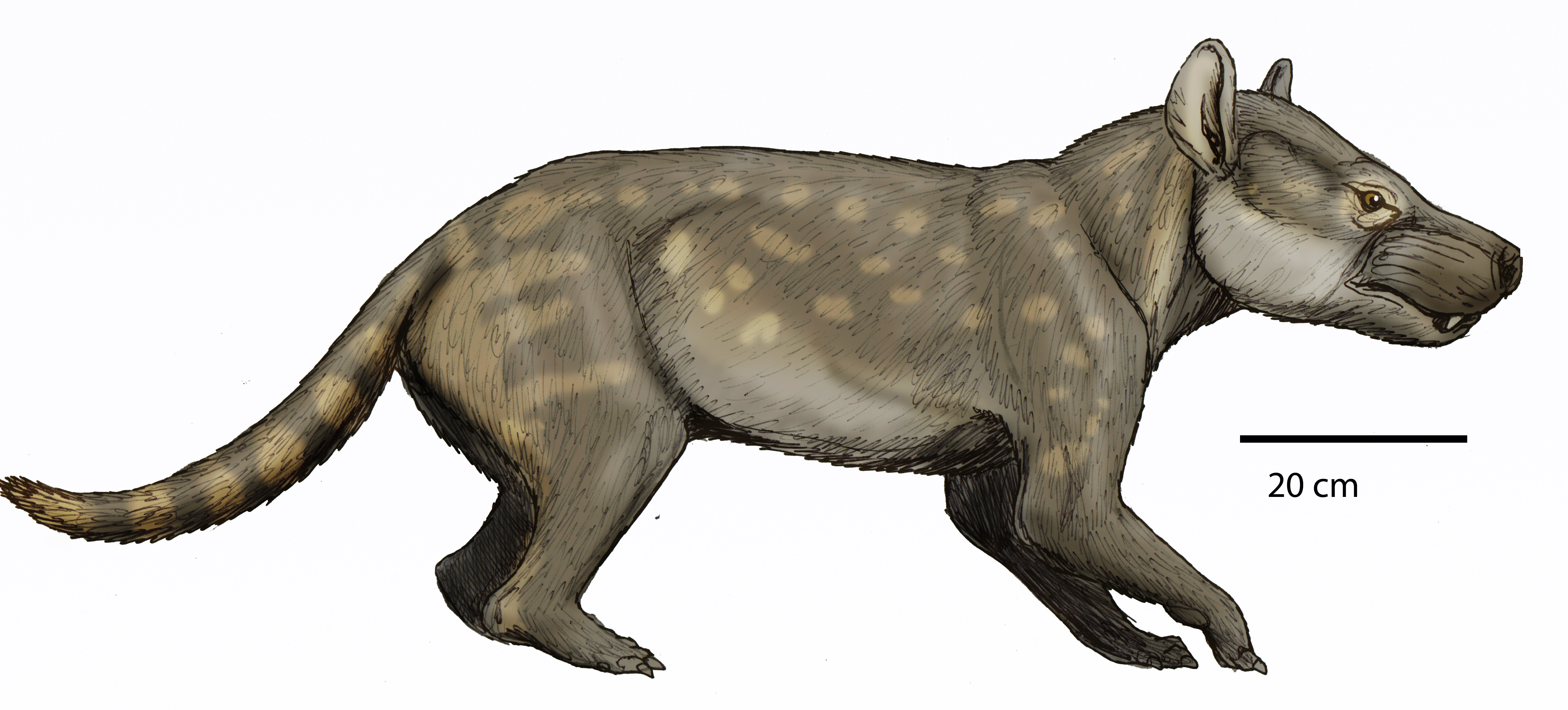
- Restoration of T. quivirensis

Scientific classification
- Kingdom: Animalia
- Phylum: Chordata
- Class: Mammalia
- Clade: Pan-Euungulata
- Family: †Triisodontidae
- Genus: †Triisodon; Cope, 1881

Type species
- Triisodon quivirensis Cope, 1881

Species
- T. quivirensis (Cope, 1881); T. crassicuspis (Cope, 1882)

Synonyms
- T. antiquus (Cope, 1882); T. rusticus (Cope, 1883)

= Triisodon =

Triisodon Temporal range: Early Paleocene (Torrejonian), 63.5–62 Ma

Extinct genus of mammals

Triisodon (ancient Greek: "Tri" (three),"isos" (equal), and modern Greek: "donti" (tooth/teeth), supposedly describing tritubercular lower cheek teeth) is a genus of an extinct family of hoofed mammals known as Triisodontidae. Triisodon existed during the Early Paleocene of New Mexico, North America, from about 63.5-62.0 Ma. The genus was named by Edward Drinker Cope in 1881 as a member of the Creodonta, a now invalid group that encompassed hyaenodonts, oxyaenids, mesonychians and certain arctocyonians. Cope described the type specimen of T. quivirensis as "about the size of a wolf." A smaller species, T. crassicuspis, has also been identified from the same region. Since material from this genus is incomplete, the exact size of adults and whether they showed sexual dimorphism or regional variations in size is unknown.

Triisodon would go extinct during a faunal turnover between the Tj4-5 and Tj6 biozones, caused by the U27r excursion, a warming period that saw an increase in aridity.

== Taxonomy ==
Triisodon is the type genus of the family Triisodontidae, a group of hoofed mammals. Other triisodontid genera, including Goniacodon, Eoconodon, Stelocyon, and Oxyclaenus. Like many very early mammals, the relationship of triisonodontids to other living and fossil mammals has been uncertain. Originally, Triisodontidae were considered to be a family within Creodonta. Matthew (1909) would reclassify triisodontids as triisodontines within Mesonychidae within the suborder Acreodi. In a later paper, Matthew recovered triisodontines within Arctocyonidae.

Arctocyonids, as well as mesonychids, would be moved from Creodonta and into Condylarthra, also known as archaic ungulates by Van Valen (1966). Triisodontines would later be reclassified as Triisodontidae by McKenna and Bell (1997), as a family within Mesonychia. However most experts recover the family outside of the order. Tabuce et al. (2011) and Shelley et al. (2015) recovered triisodontids as a paraphyletic group stem to mesonychians. On the other hand, more recent analysis suggesting a closer relation to living ungulates.

=== Species ===
- Genus Triisodon
  - Triisodon crassicuspis (= T. rusticus)
    - Lower Paleocene (Torrejonian). Much smaller than T. quivirensis and with more elongate third premolar; distinguished from Eoconodon by having a somewhat reduced third molar. Assigned in the past to the genera Conoryctes and Goniacodon.
  - Triisodon quivirensis (= T. antiquus)
    - Lower Paleocene (Torrejonian), coexisted in the same habitat with T. crassicuspis. Distinguished from T. crassicuspis by much larger size, from Eoconodon as above.
  - Triisodon heilprinianus identified by Cope, 1882 on the basis of a single molar, has since been referred to multiple groups. Referred to Eoconodon coryphaeus by Kondrashov and Lucas 2006.

== Description ==
Triisodon was a rather large and powerful terrestrial mammal, as evident from the robust forelimb morphology. The body mass of T. crassicuspis is estimated at 32–44 kg (71–97 lb) making it similar in size to a striped hyena and gray wolf. T. quivirensis is considered to be even larger than T. crassicuspis.

=== Skull and dentition ===
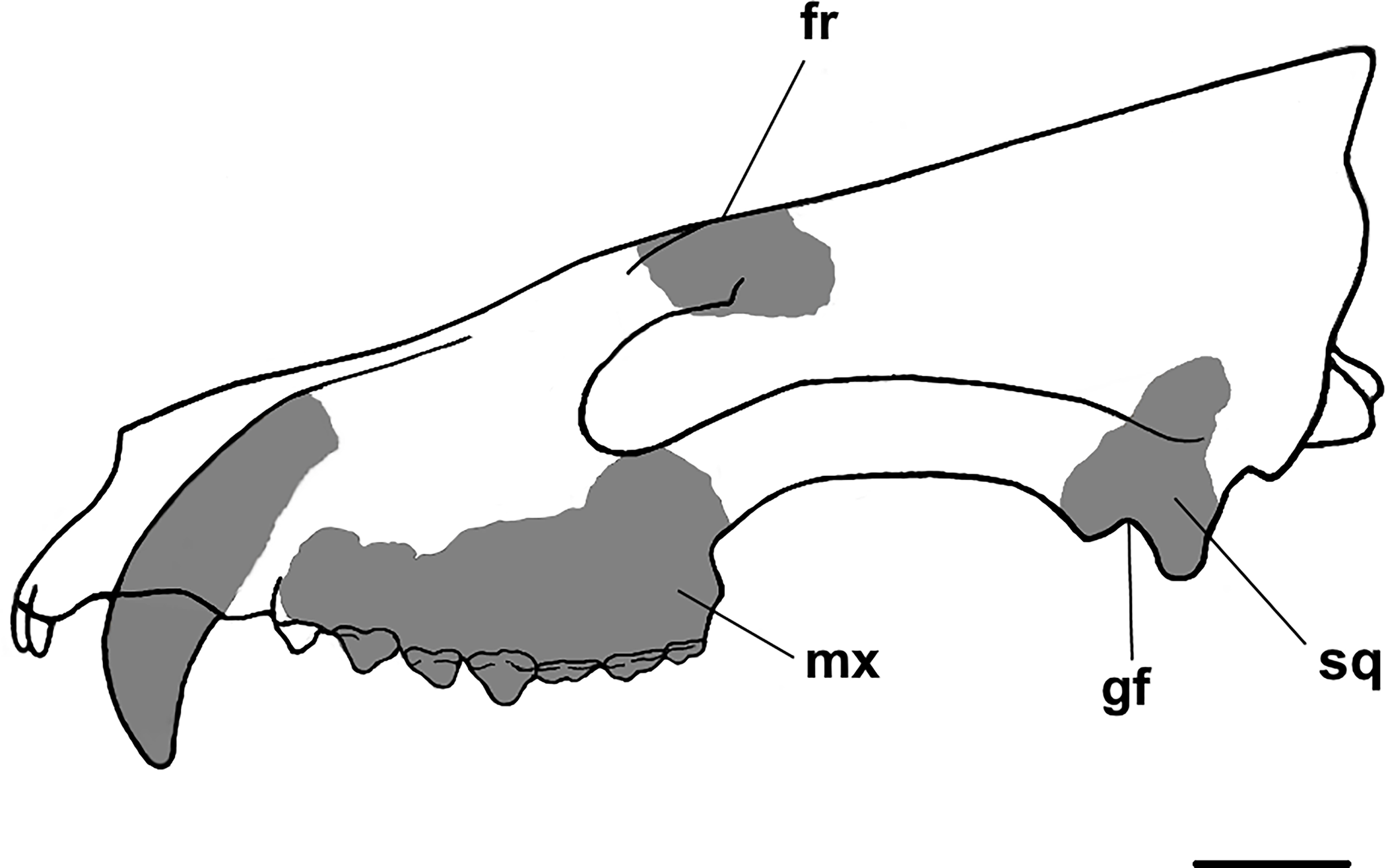
Skull reconstruction of T. crassicuspis, with known material in grey, with areas in white restored after other triisodontids, including T. quivirensis.

The skull of T. crassicuspis exhibits rostral constriction, particularly above the upper second premolar, similar to Arctocyon primaevus. The maxilla of T. crassicuspis barely extends onto the zygomatic arch laterally. The posterior zygomatic arch was particularly robust. T. crassicuspis had a large and particularly deep mandibular fossa that is more elongated mediolaterally than anteroposteriorly. The depth of the fossa suggests that it formed a relatively tight hinge-like articulation with the condyle of the mandible. As in Arctocyon, the articular surface of the mandibular fossa in T. crassicuspis is smooth and continuous.

The paired hemi-mandibles of T. crassicuspis were not co-ossified towards the front, as indicated by the rugose texture of the mandibular symphysis. The mandibular body of T. crassicuspis is proportionately deeper dorsoventrally and significantly more robust compared to that of Eoconodon coryphaeus, or mesonychids like Sinonyx jiashanensis and Dissacus praenuntius. In T. crassicuspis, a massive and mediolaterally broad coronoid crest forms the anterior surface of the coronoid process. The coronoid crest ends below the lower third molar, as in T. quivirensis, Eoconodon, and Arctocyon.

The teeth of Triisodon exhibit several morphological similarities to those of other triisodontids including the diagnostic characteristics of the group: basin-shaped talonids and tribosphenic upper molars.

=== Postcranial skeleton ===
While the postcranial skeleton of Triisodon was less robust compared to other "condylarths" like Periptychus and Arctocyon, it was far from gracile. Much of what is known about the forelimb of Triisodon comes from the humerus, with both the greater and lesser tubercles placed low relative to the massive, hemispherical humeral head. In addition, the humerus also had a prominent, V-shaped deltopectoral region that extended anteriorly. The attachment site for the teres major and latissimus dorsi muscles is poorly defined. The distal humeral epiphysis is anteroposteriorly compressed. The humeral trochlea is asymmetrical, as it is in Arctocyon and other "triisodontids" including Goniacodon levisanus and Eoconodon. The humeral trochlea and rounded capitulum form a near continuous articular surface, isolated by a zona conoidea that is poorly-developed. The medial crest of the humeral trochlea is very prominent and is slightly flared, protruding mediodistally, while the lateral crest is smaller and protrudes posteriorly.

The ulna is conspicuously more gracile relative to the humerus, and has a gently convex ventral border. The ulna has a large coronoid process, while the trochlear notch has a saddle-shaped anterior surface. The ulnar diaphysis bears a deep fossa for the abductor pollicis longus muscle on the lateral surface, while the distal ulna was relatively thick, with a well-developed pronator quadratus crest on its medial surface. The radius is somewhat robust relative to the ulna, and exhibits an ovoid, shallowly concave radial fovea. The radial diaphysis is also rather straight in its proximal portion, with a bicipital tuberosity that is proximodistally long, but not particularly prominent compared to condylarths including Goniacodon, Arctocyon, and Ankalagon. Triisodon also had a massive, hemispherical femoral head with a smooth articular surface, and an ovoid, somewhat deep fovea capitis for attachment of the ligamentum teres.

== Paleobiology ==
=== Diet ===
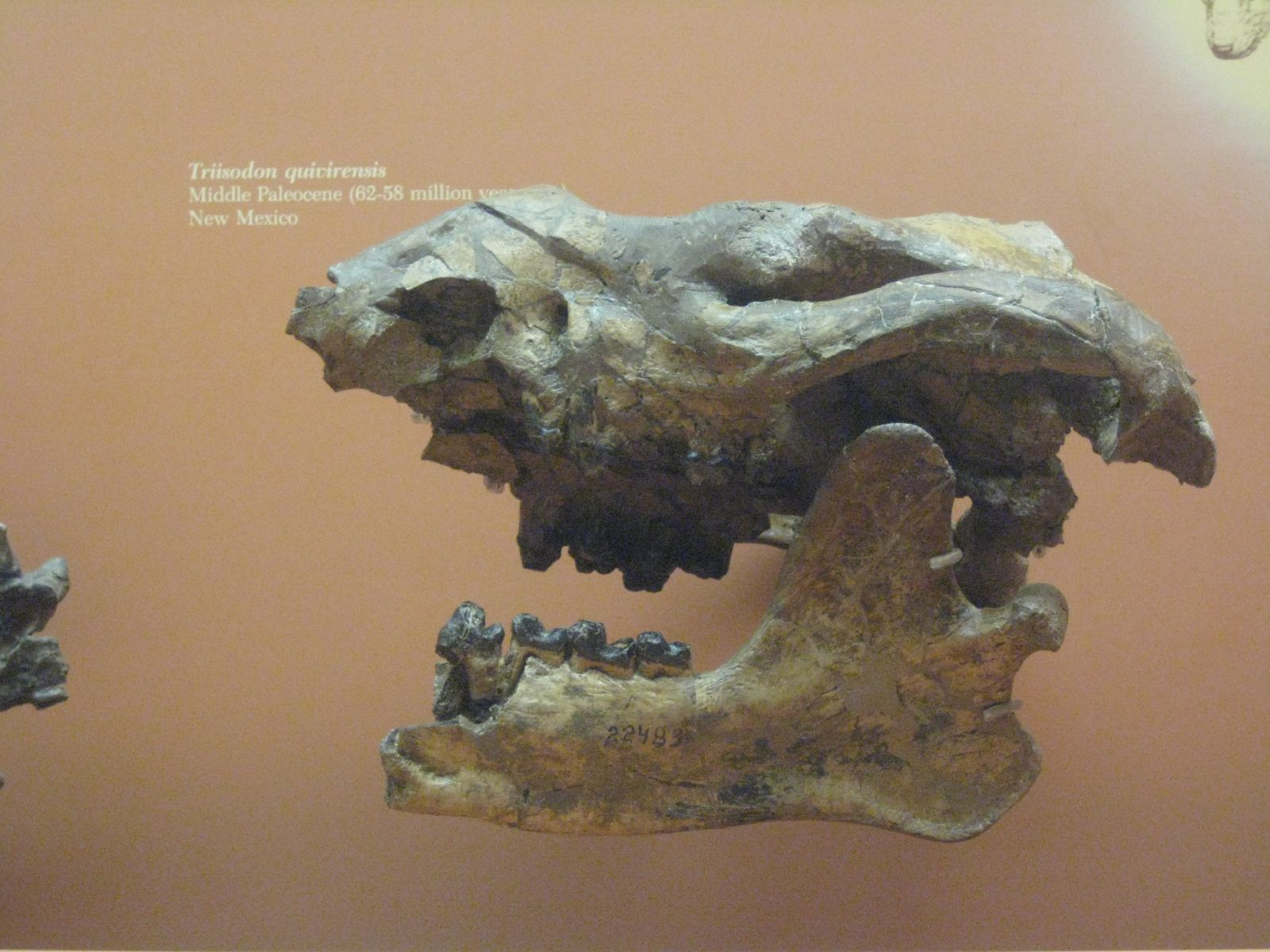
Skull of T. quivirensis

The canines of Triisodon are massive and single-rooted, with marked shearing edges. Other features of the teeth reveal that Triisodon and other triisodontids were showing evolutionary trends towards a carnivorous lifestyle – notably the mesiodistally oriented hypoconulid crest, tall trigonid and distinct protoconid of the lower molars, as well as the strongly-developed posterior premolars bearing marked shearing surfaces. Among triisodontids, Triisodon showed the most specialization towards carnivory. Despite showing signs of carnivory, Triisodon cheek dentition were poorly suited for slicing flesh compared to hypercarnivorous carnivorans such as felids. The broad, low-crowned, bunodont molars Triisodon were similar to that of bears, suggesting it had diet consisting of fruits, nuts, seeds, invertebrates, as well as medium to large sized vertebrates and carrion. The deepened glenoid fossa as well as inflated, conical molar cusps suggests it may have been engaging in durophagy.

=== Locomotion ===
Triisodon may have had strong shoulders, as indicated by the anteriorly prominent deltopectoral region. Triisodon may also have had moderate digging capabilities, as evident from the thick distal ulna and the robustness of the humerus. The fossa for the abductor pollicis longus muscle on the ulna suggests high-powered forelimb extension, which is movement possibly linked to brief bursts of quick terrestrial locomotion including running.
