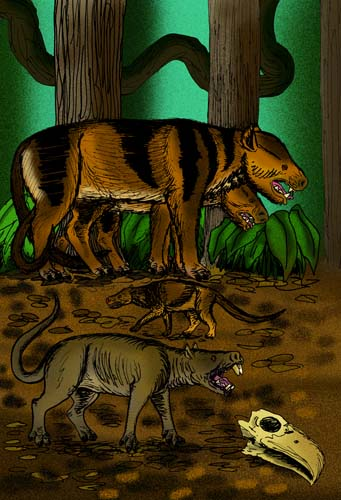
- Various Acreodi genera from Nacimiento Formation. From top: Ankalagon, Dissacus, and Triisodon

Scientific classification
- Kingdom: Animalia
- Phylum: Chordata
- Class: Mammalia
- Clade: Scrotifera
- Grandorder: Ferungulata
- Clade: Pan-Euungulata
- Order: †Acreodi; Matthew, 1909

Subgroups
- †Andrewsarchus †Mesonychia †Mondegodon †Triisodontidae †Olseniidae

Synonyms
- Mesonychia (Rose, 2006)

= Acreodi =

Acreodi Temporal range: Early Paleocene—Late Eocene 65.4–34 Ma Suspected Late Cretaceous origins

Informal extinct order of mammals

Acreodi is an informal order of ungulate-like mammals that lived during the Paleogene, first appearing in the Early Paleocene, before going extinct during the Late Eocene. The earliest Acreodi appeared roughly 600,000 years after the extinction of the non-avian dinosaurs. The order consisted of groups such as Triisodontidae, Mesonychia, Olseniidae, as well as Andrewsarchus and Mondegodon.

Originally, Acreodi were thought to have been ancestral or closely related to Cetacea. However, more recent analysis found Cetacea to be nested within Artiodactyla. The order is also now thought to have been a polyphyletic group of unrelated mammals with Andrewsarchus being recovered within Cetancodontamorpha. Triisodontids have been recovered as being more closely related to ungulates than to mesonychians.
