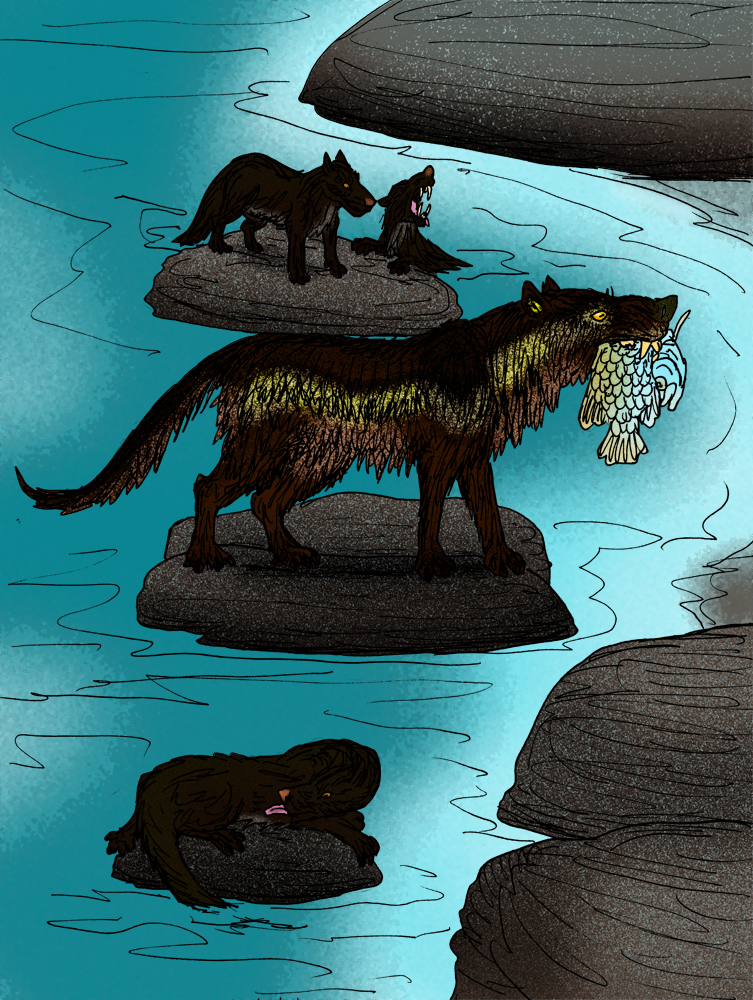
- Lohoodon (center), compared with Hapalodectes

Scientific classification
- Kingdom: Animalia
- Phylum: Chordata
- Class: Mammalia
- Order: †Mesonychia
- Family: †Hapalodectidae
- Genus: †Lohoodon

Species
- L. lushiensis

= Lohoodon =

Lohoodon Temporal range: Lutetian

Extinct genus of mesonychid mammals

Lohoodon is a genus of mesonychid mesonychians which lived during the Lutetian Epoch of the Middle Eocene. Fossils of Lohoodon are found in middle Eocene-aged Lushi Formation in the Lushi Basin, Henan Province, China.

Lohoodon was originally described as a large hapalodectid, first as an "undescribed species of Hapalodectes," then later as "Hapalodectes lushiensis," on the basis of teeth and jaw fragments very similar to Hapalodectes, but suggesting an animal comparable in size to Mesonyx. In 1987, Ting & Li refer Lohoodon and Metahapalodectes to Mesonychidae due to the lower molar teeth of both genera lacking a re-entrant groove on the mesial or anterior side, a feature diagnostic of Hapalodectidae.

== Species ==
- Genus Lohoodon
  - L. lushiensis
