= Hapalorestes =

Hapalorestes Temporal range: Early Eocene–Middle Eocene

Scientific classification
- Domain: Eukaryota
- Kingdom: Animalia
- Phylum: Chordata
- Class: Mammalia
- Order: †Mesonychia
- Family: †Hapalodectidae
- Genus: †Hapalorestes

Species
- H. lovei

Extinct genus of mammals

Hapalorestes is a genus of hapalodectid that lived during the early to middle Eocene. An average living individual's weight is estimated at 1 to 8 kilograms.

A characteristic trait of Hapalorestes is that the lower third molar is the longest in the row. There are broad, deep ‘embrasure pits’ present on the palate which would receive the crowns of the lower teeth when the jaws were closed. Similar pits are seen on the palates of Stem-whales, which has led some to believe they may share a close relation to modern whales.

== Species ==
- Genus Hapalorestes
  - Hapalorestes lovei
