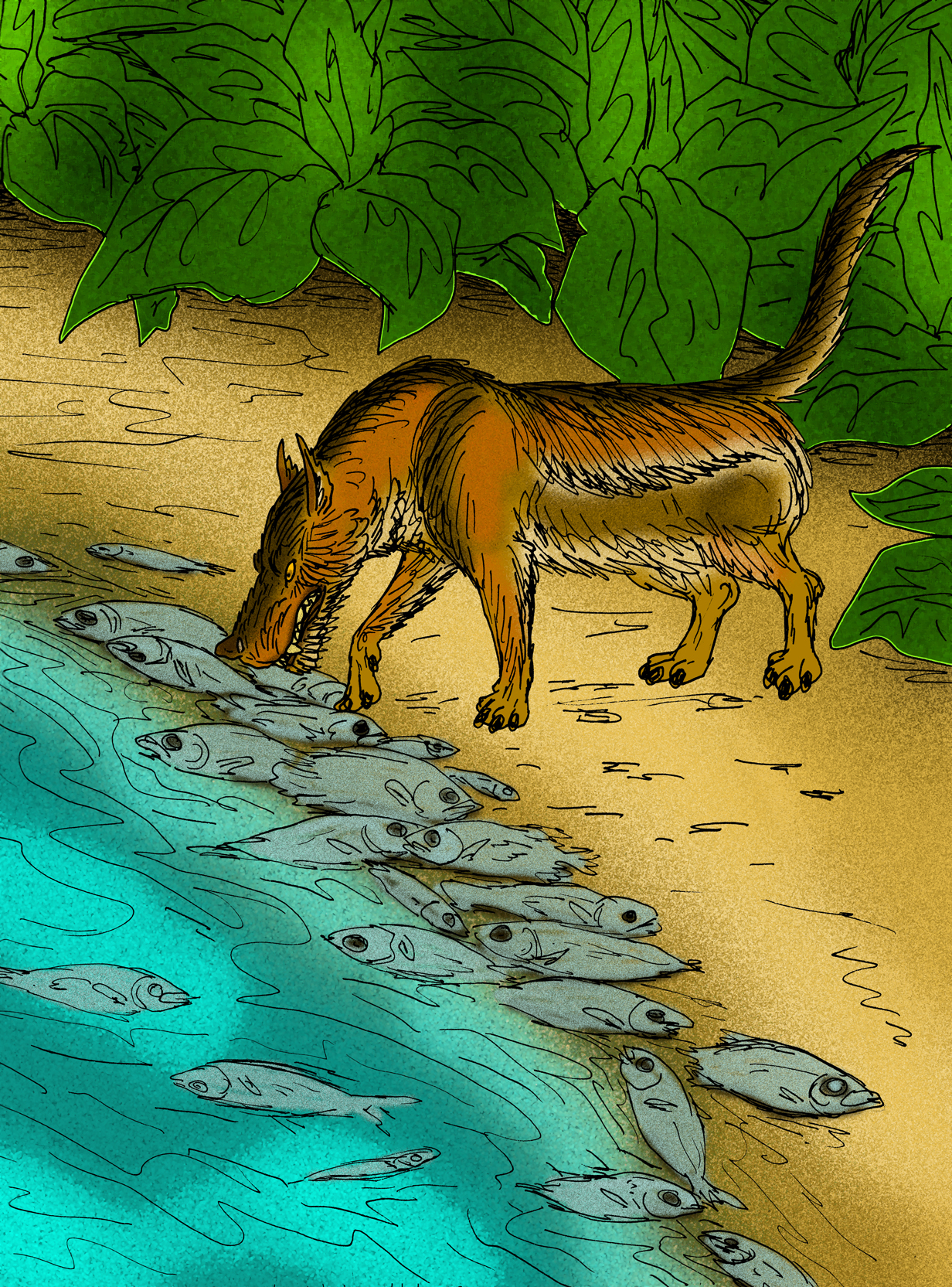
- Restoration of M. makhchinus

Scientific classification
- Kingdom: Animalia
- Phylum: Chordata
- Class: Mammalia
- Order: †Mesonychia
- Family: †Mesonychidae
- Genus: †Metahapalodectes; Dashzeveg, 1976
- Species: †M. makhchinus

Binomial name
- †Metahapalodectes makhchinus Dashzeveg, 1976

= Metahapalodectes =

Metahapalodectes Temporal range: 48.6–37.2 Ma

Extinct genus of mesonychid mammal

Metahapalodectes is an extinct mesonychid mesonychian from Late Eocene strata of Southeastern Mongolia.

Similar to Lohoodon, Metahapalodectes was originally described as a large hapalodectid on the basis of teeth and jaw fragments very similar to Hapalodectes, but suggesting an animal comparable in size to Mesonyx. In 1987, Ting & Li refer Lohoodon and Metahapalodectes to Mesonychidae due to the lower molar teeth of both genera lacking a re-entrant groove on the mesial or anterior side, a feature diagnostic of Hapalodectidae.
