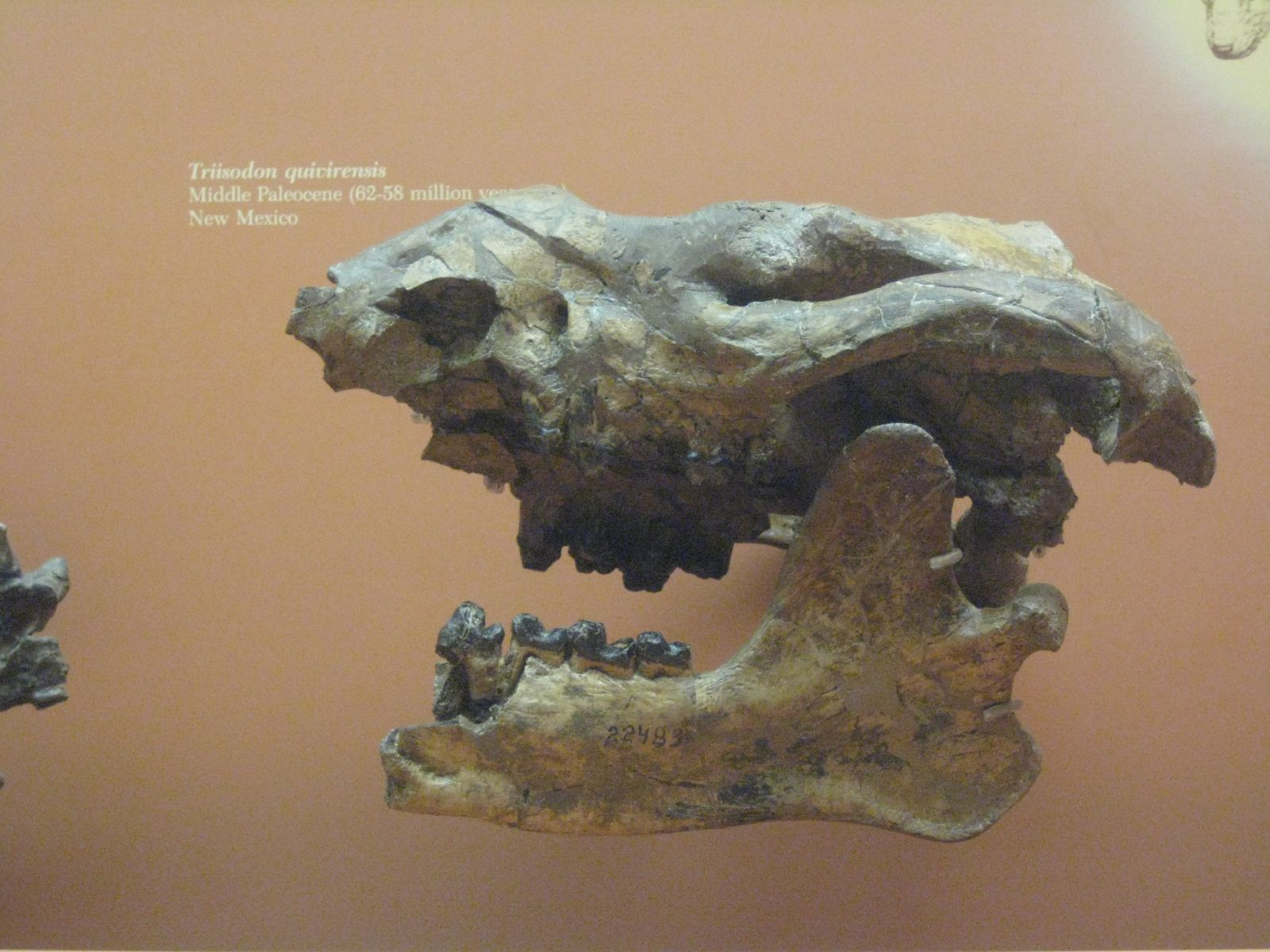
- Skull and jaws of Triisodon quivirensis
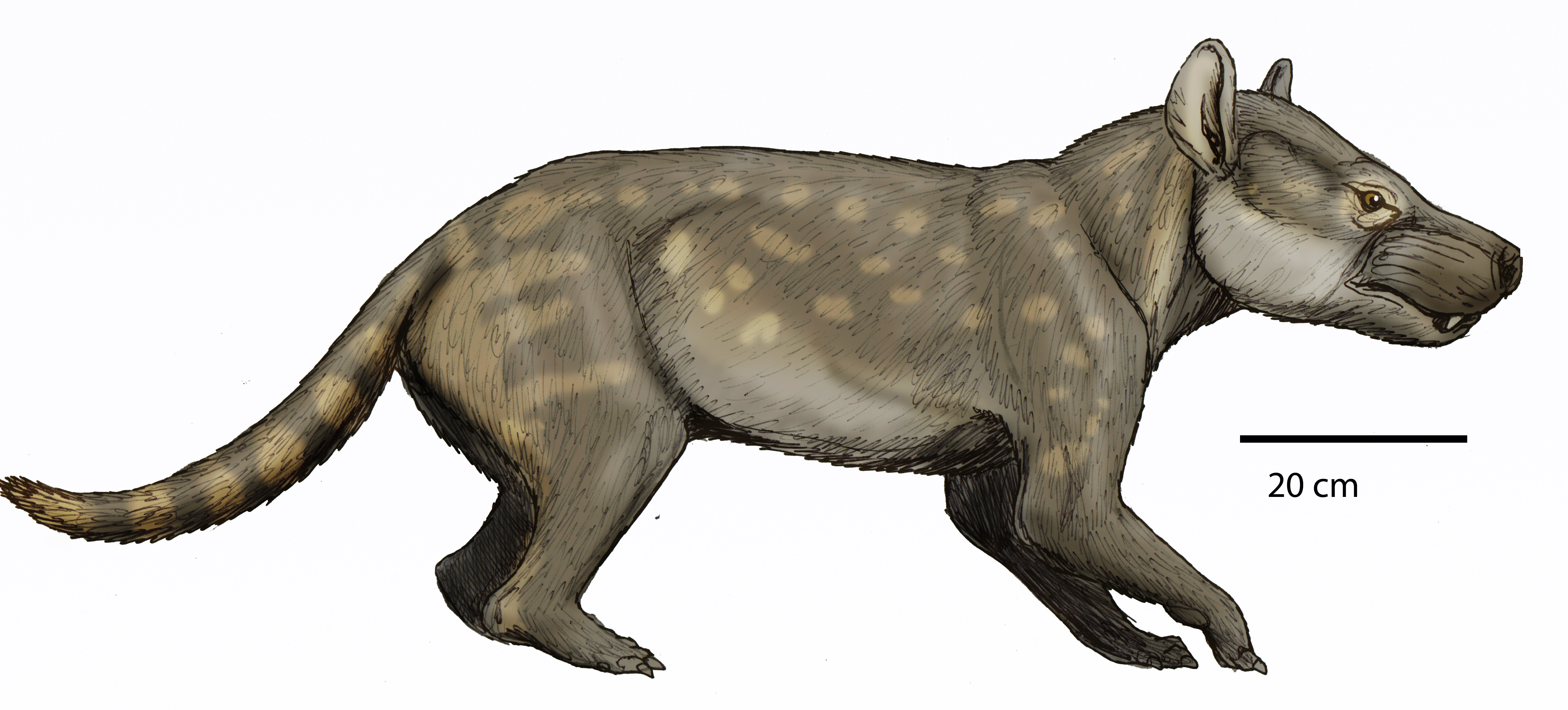
- Life restoration of Triisodon quivirensis

Scientific classification
- Kingdom: Animalia
- Phylum: Chordata
- Class: Mammalia
- Clade: Pan-Euungulata
- Family: †Triisodontidae; Scott, 1894

Type genus
- †Triisodon Cope, 1881

Genera
†Eoconodon
†Goniacodon
†Oxyclaenus
†Stelocyon
†Triisodon
Possible triisodontids
- †Mondegodon

Synonyms
- Triisodontinae Troussart, 1904

= Triisodontidae =

Triisodontidae Temporal range: Early to Late Paleocene 65.4–57.5 Ma

Extinct family of mammals

Triisodontidae is an extinct paraphyletic family of hoofed mammals that were endemic to North America during the Paleocene. Triisodontids were the first large predatory mammals to appear in North America following the extinction of the non-avian dinosaurs. They differ from mesonychians in having less highly modified dentition.

Their relationship with mesonychians has changed since the discovery of the family. Scott (1894) suggested a close relationship with mesonychids. Some experts would classify triisodontids as mesonychians. It was also hypothesized because of their less derived dentition, they may have considered them to have ancestral to mesonychids. An abstract by Sarah et al. (2015) recovered triisodontids as a paraphyletic group of stem-mesonychians. However, other studies recovered triisodontids to be more closely related to modern ungulates than to mesonychians. Phylogenetic analysis by Solé et al. (2023), suggests mesonychians split off from the lineage leading to triisodontids during the Late Cretaceous.

== Taxonomy ==
=== Classification ===
Triisodontidae was first named by Scott (1894) within the order Creodonta, being closely related to mesonychids. Triisodontids were classified as Triisodontinae by Troussart (1904). Matthew (1909) would classify triisodontines as mesonychids within Creodonta, within the suborder Acreodi. However, Matthew (1937) would move triisodontines within Arctocyonidae. Mesonychids and arctocyonids would be moved from Creodonta and into Condylarthra, also known as archaic ungulates by Van Valen (1966). Triisodontines would later be reclassified as a family of mammals, with some studies such as McKenna and Bell (1997) reclassifying them as mesonychians. Within phylogenetic analysis by Tabuce et al. (2011) recovered the family as a basal paraphyletic family within Acreodi. Sarah et al. (2015) recovered triisodontids as a paraphyletic stem-mesonychians within Euungulata. However, other studies classify them more closely related to living ungulates than to mesonychians.

== Description ==
The largest triisodontid genus was Triisodon, with the smallest species weighing between 32–44 kg (71–97 lb).
