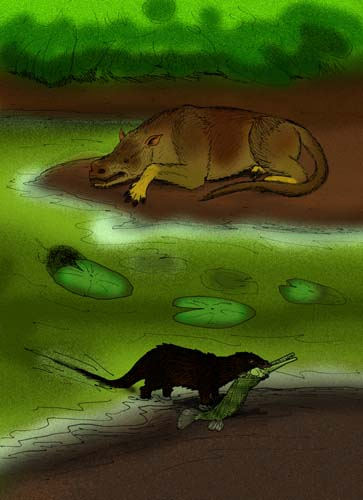
- Life restoration of Hapalodectes serus (bottom) and Pachyaena

Scientific classification
- Kingdom: Animalia
- Phylum: Chordata
- Class: Mammalia
- Order: †Mesonychia
- Family: †Hapalodectidae; Szalay & Gould, 1966

Genera
- Hapalodectes Matthew, 1909; Hapalorestes Gunnell & Gingerich, 1996

= Hapalodectidae =

Hapalodectidae Temporal range: Middle Paleocene—Middle Eocene, 61–44 Ma Suspected Late Cretaceous origin

Extinct family of mammals

Hapalodectidae (literal translation 'soft biters': hapalos ('soft, tender'), dêktês ('biter')) is an extinct family of relatively small-bodied (1–8 kg (2.2–17.6 lb)) mesonychian placental mammals from the Middle Paleocene to Middle Eocene of North America and Asia. Hapalodectids differ from the larger and better-known mesonychids by having teeth specialized for cutting (presumably meat), while the teeth of other mesonychids, such as Mesonyx or Sinonyx, are more specialized for crushing bones. Hapalodectids were once considered a subfamily of the Mesonychidae, but the discovery of a skull of Hapalodectes hetangensis showed additional differences justifying placement in a distinct family. In particular, H. hetangensis has a postorbital bar closing the back of the orbit, a feature lacking in mesonychids. The postcranial skeletal anatomy of hapalodectids is poorly known, and of the postcranial elements, only the humerus has been described. The morphology of this bone indicates less specialization for terrestrial locomotion than in mesonychids.

== Taxa ==
"Hapalodectinae" was originally erected on the basis of Hapalodectes, and, after promotion to family ranking, contained up to five genera based on teeth and jaw fragments with anatomies similar to Hapalodectes. However, as of Ting and Li, 1987, and confirmed with Gunnell and Gingerich, 1996, the genera Honanodon, Lohoodon and Metahapalodectes are no longer considered hapalodectids due to the absence of grooves on the lower molars otherwise diagnostic of Hapalodectes and Hapalorestes.

Family Hapalodectidae

- Genus Hapalodectes
  - H. anthracinus Zhou et Gingerich, 1991
  - H. dux Lopatin, 1999
  - H. hetangensis Ting et Li, 1987
  - H. huanghaiensis Tong et Wang, 2006
  - H. leptognathus Osborn et Wortman, 1892
  - H. lopatini Solé et al., 2017
  - H. paleocenus Beard et al., 2010
  - H. serus Matthew et Granger, 1925
- Genus Hapalorestes
  - H. lovei
