= Stelocyon =

Stelocyon Temporal range: Paleocene

Scientific classification
- Kingdom: Animalia
- Phylum: Chordata
- Class: Mammalia
- Family: †Triisodontidae
- Genus: †Stelocyon; Gingerich, 1978

Species
- S. arctylos Gingerich, 1978

Stelocyon is an extinct genus of triisodontid from the Paleocene of North America.
