= Mondegodon =

Mondegodon Temporal range: Early Eocene
- Life reconstruction of Mondegodon

Scientific classification
- Kingdom: Animalia
- Phylum: Chordata
- Class: Mammalia
- Grandorder: Ferungulata
- Genus: †Mondegodon; Tabuce, Clavel & Antunes, 2011

Type species
- †M. eutrigonus Tabuce, Clavel & Antunes, 2011

Extinct genus of mammals

Mondegodon is an extinct genus of mammal which existed in Portugal, during the earliest Eocene (Neustrian age). It is known from the holotype – UNLSNC-19, and other parts of dentary, recovered from the Silveirinha Formation, Portugal. It was first named by Rodolphe Tabuce, Julien Clavel and Miguel Telles Antunes in 2011 and the type species is Mondegodon eutrigonus. The generic name is derived from "Baixo Mondego", the region where Silveirinha is located; and odon (Greek), for "tooth" by analogy with triisodontid generic names. The specific name is derived from the prefix eu (Greek), "well", and trigonus (Latin), "three-cornered" in reference to the remarkable tricuspidate pattern of the upper molars.
