= Goniacodon =

Goniacodon Temporal range: Early-Late Paleocene (late Puercan-early Tiffanian) ~60–58 Ma
- Left dentary of G. levisanus

Scientific classification
- Kingdom: Animalia
- Phylum: Chordata
- Class: Mammalia
- Family: †Triisodontidae
- Genus: †Goniacodon; Scott, 1892

Type species
- Goniacodon levisanus Cope, 1883

Other species
- G. gaudryanus (Cope, 1888); G. hiawathae Van Valen, 1978

Goniacodon is an extinct genus of triisodontid mammal that lived between the Early Paleocene and Late Paleocene stages of the Cenozoic. In the northern Great Plains of North America, Goniacodon fossils are known as late as the Tiffanian, whereas in the central and southern Great Plains its fossils date to the Early Paleocene. The holotype (name-bearing) specimen of G. levisanus consists of an incomplete right dentary with the fourth premolar that is cataloged at the American Museum of Natural History under AMNH 3217.
