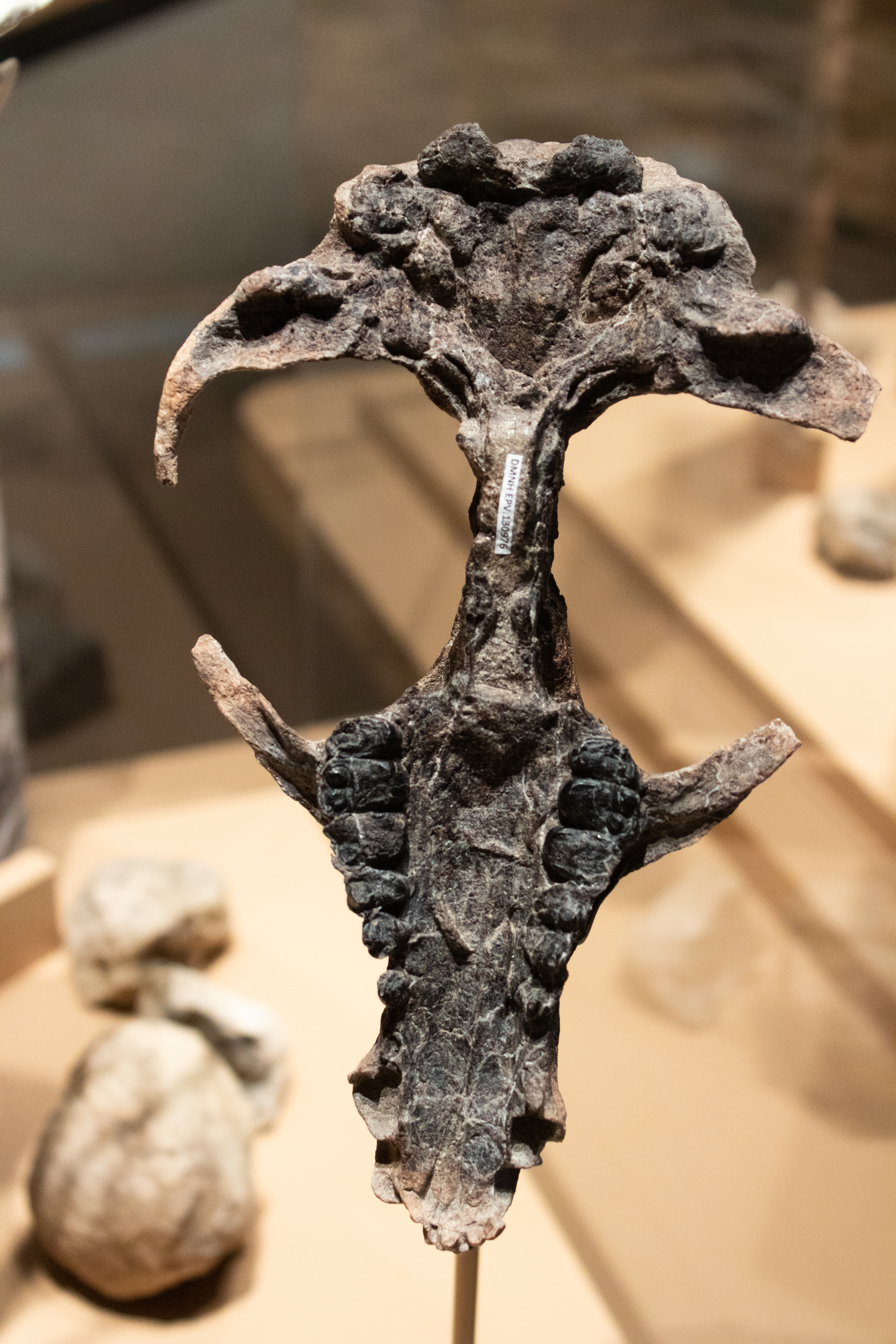
- Eoconodon coryphaeus skull, Denver Museum of Nature and Science
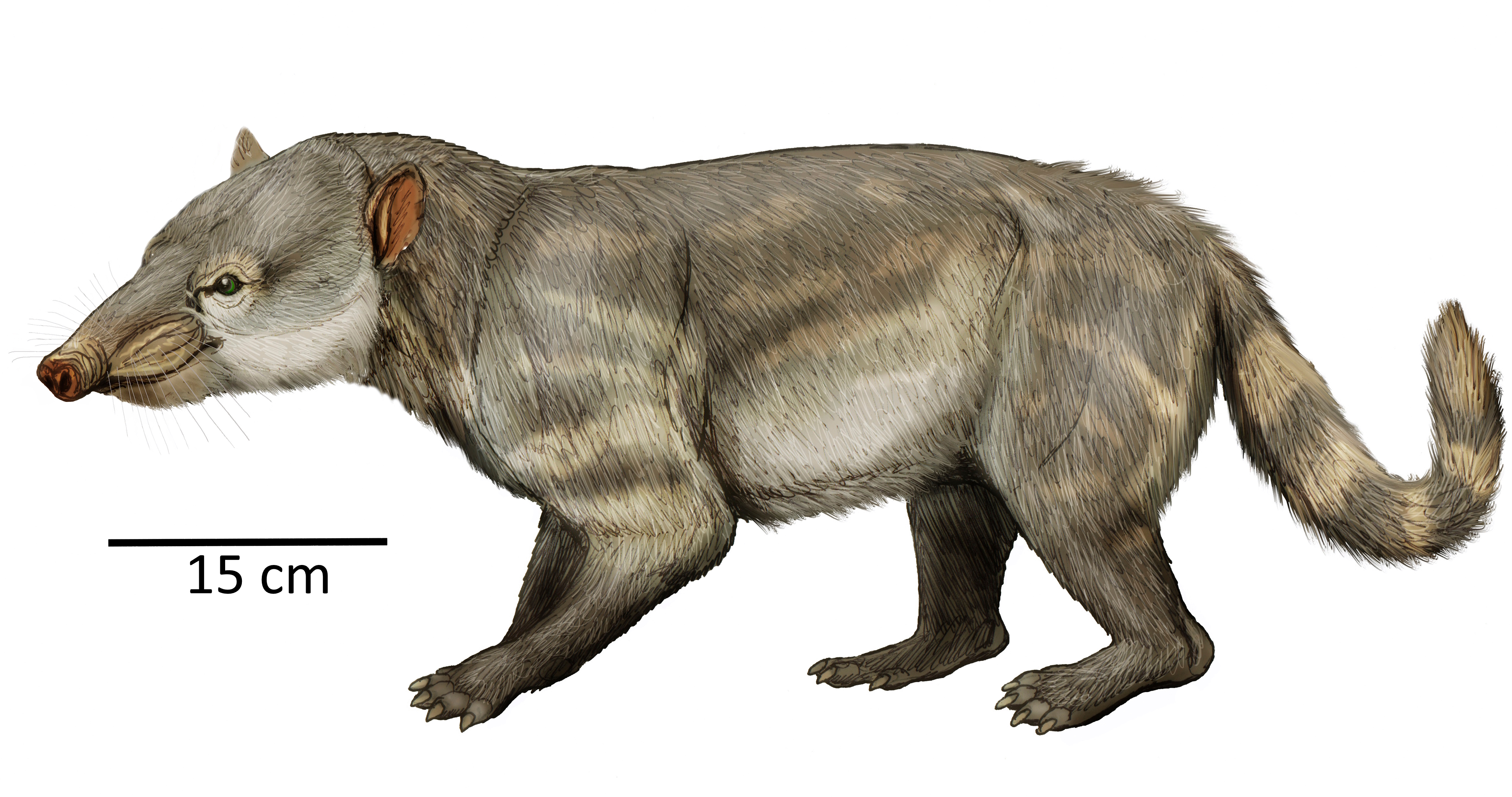
- Life reconstruction of Eoconodon coryphaeus

Scientific classification
- Kingdom: Animalia
- Phylum: Chordata
- Class: Mammalia
- Family: †Triisodontidae
- Genus: †Eoconodon; Matthew & Granger, 1921

Type species
- †Eoconodon coryphaeus (Cope, 1885)

Other species
- E. copanus; E. ginibitohia; E. heilprinianus; E. nidhoggi

= Eoconodon =

Eoconodon Temporal range: Early Paleocene (Puercan) 65.4–63.5 Ma

Extinct genus of mammal

Eoconodon is an extinct genus of triisodontid that existed during the Early Paleocene of North America. Characteristics of the genus include massive jaws, blunt builds, and strong canine teeth.

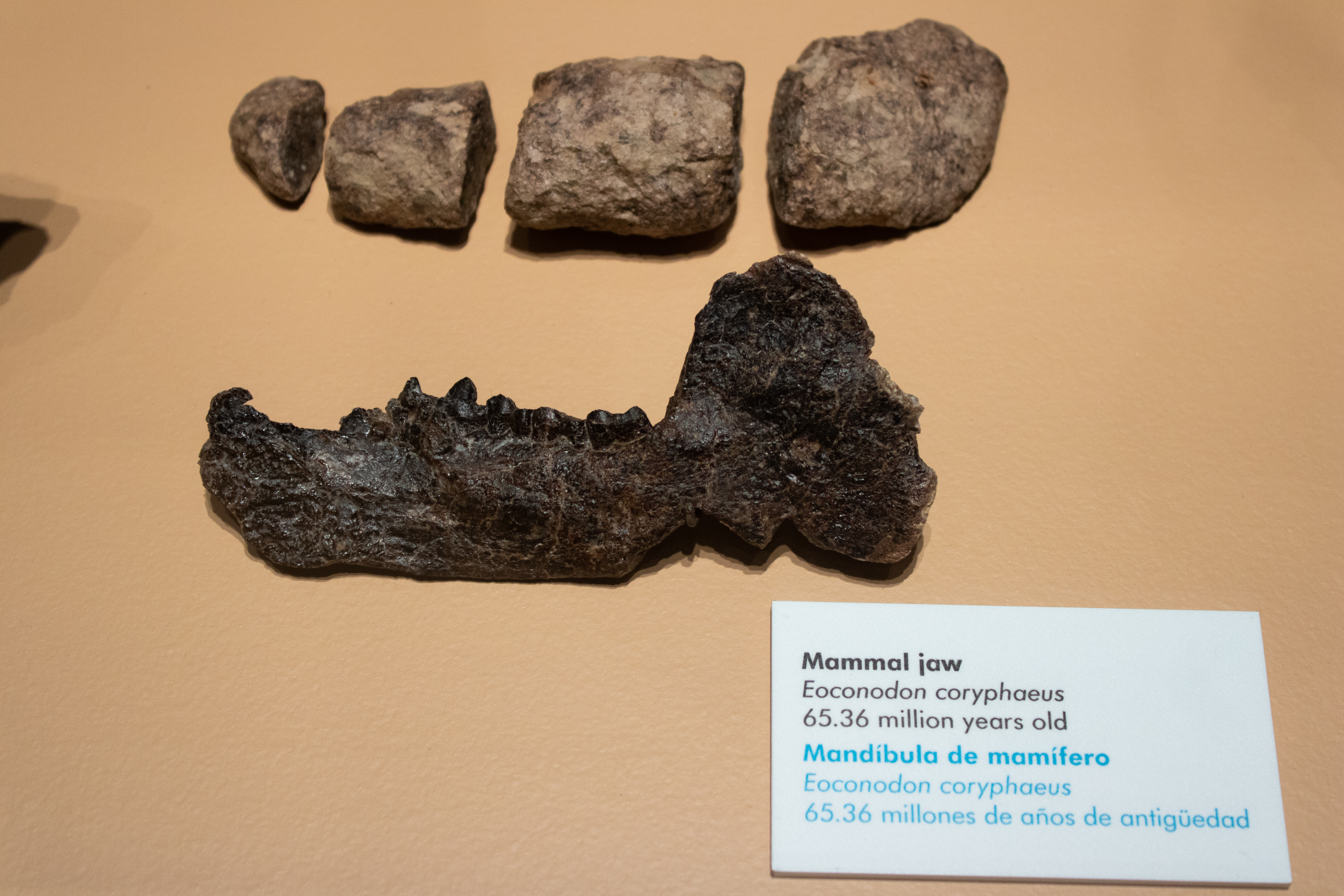
E. coryphaeus jaw

Eoconodon is considered to be a giant for mammals during the Early Paleocene, with E. coryphaeus weighing up to 47 kilograms (104 lb), although other experts suggest a smaller mass estimate of 12.6 kg (28 lb).
