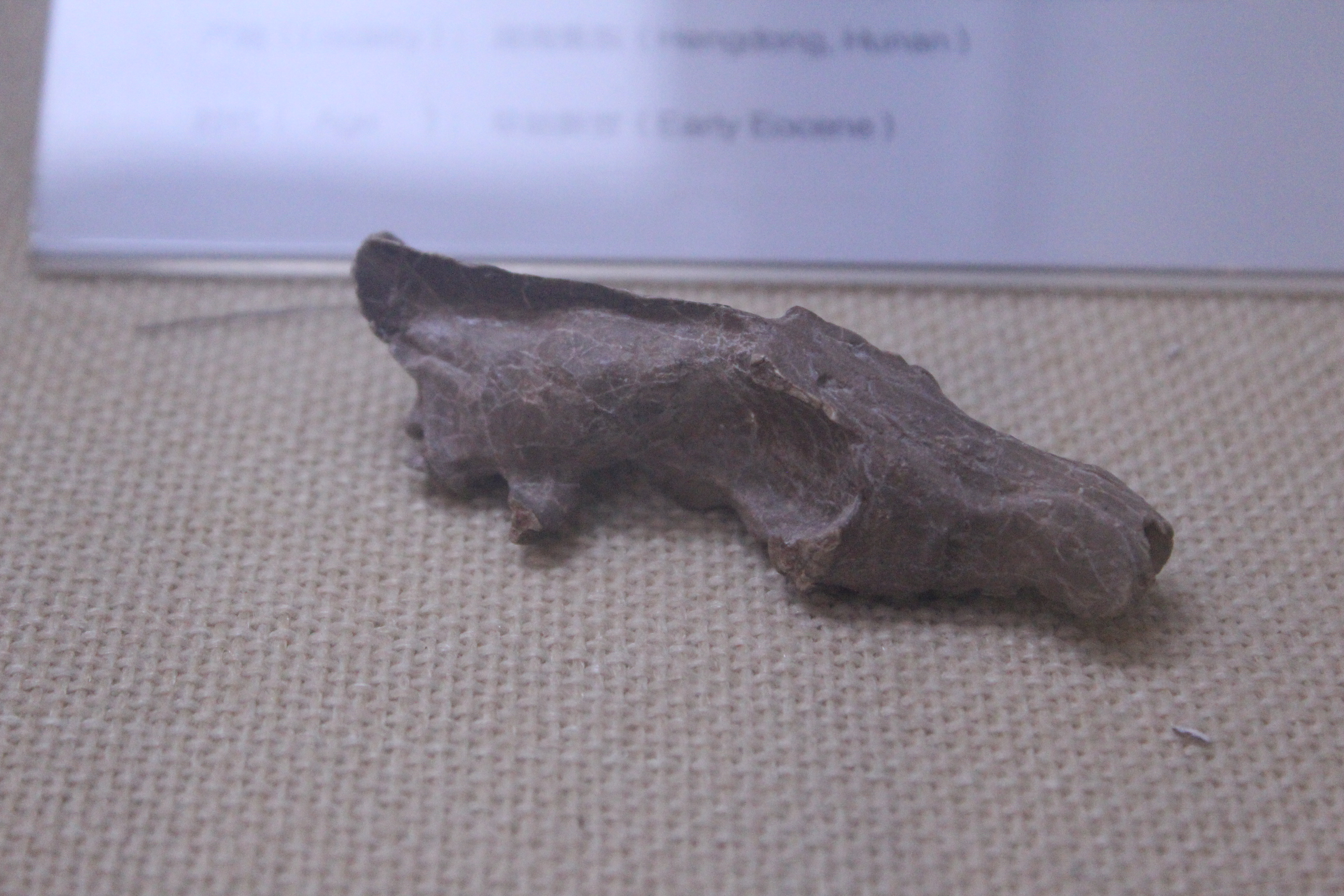
- Skull (IVPP V12385) of H. hetangensis, Paleozoological Museum of China

Scientific classification
- Kingdom: Animalia
- Phylum: Chordata
- Class: Mammalia
- Order: †Mesonychia
- Family: †Hapalodectidae
- Genus: †Hapalodectes; Matthew, 1909

Species
- See text

= Hapalodectes =

Hapalodectes Temporal range: Middle Paleocene–Middle Eocene (Selandian to Lutetian), 62–44 Ma

Extinct genus of mammals

Hapalodectes (literal translation 'soft biter'; from Ancient Greek: ἁπαλός hapalos ('soft, tender') and δῆκτῆς dêktês ('biter')) is an extinct genus of otter-like mesonychians from the Late Paleocene to Early Eocene, from 62 to 44 million years ago. Although the first fossils were found in the Eocene strata of Wyoming, the genus originated in Mongolia, as the oldest species is H. dux, which was found in Late Paleocene strata in the Naran Bulak Formation. However, a more recent paper found an even older species from the Middle Paleocene.

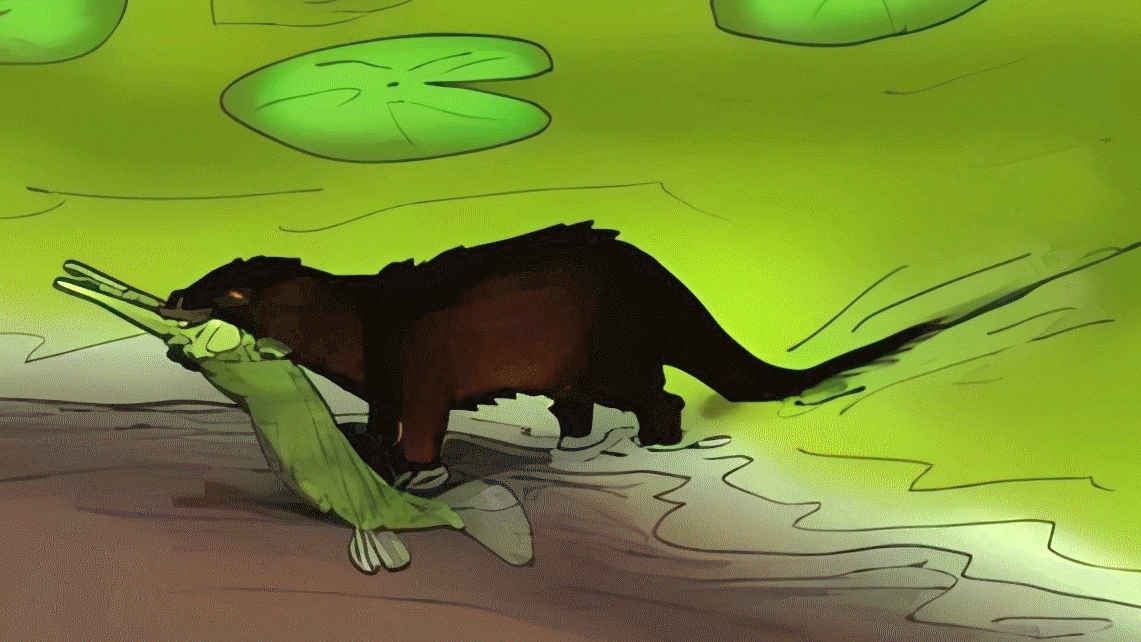
Life restoration of H. serus

The genus was once suggested to be related to the Archaeoceti, such as Pakicetus, due to numerous similarities between the skull and tooth anatomies of the two genera. Now, however, Hapalodectes and other mesonychians are thought to be related to basal artiodactyls, while the Archaeoceti are now determined to be descended from more derived artiodactyls, like Indohyus, which are related to hippopotamuses and anthracotheres.

H. dux possessed distinct conules on its upper molars.

== Species ==
- Genus Hapalodectes
  - H. anthracinus Zhou et Gingerich, 1991
  - H. dux Lopatin, 1999
  - H. hetangensis Ting et Li, 1987
  - H. huanghaiensis Tong et Wang, 2006
  - H. leptognathus Osborn et Wortman, 1892
  - H. lopatini Solé et al., 2017
  - H. paleocenus Beard et al., 2010
  - H. paradux Lopatin, 2023
  - H. serus Matthew et Granger, 1925
