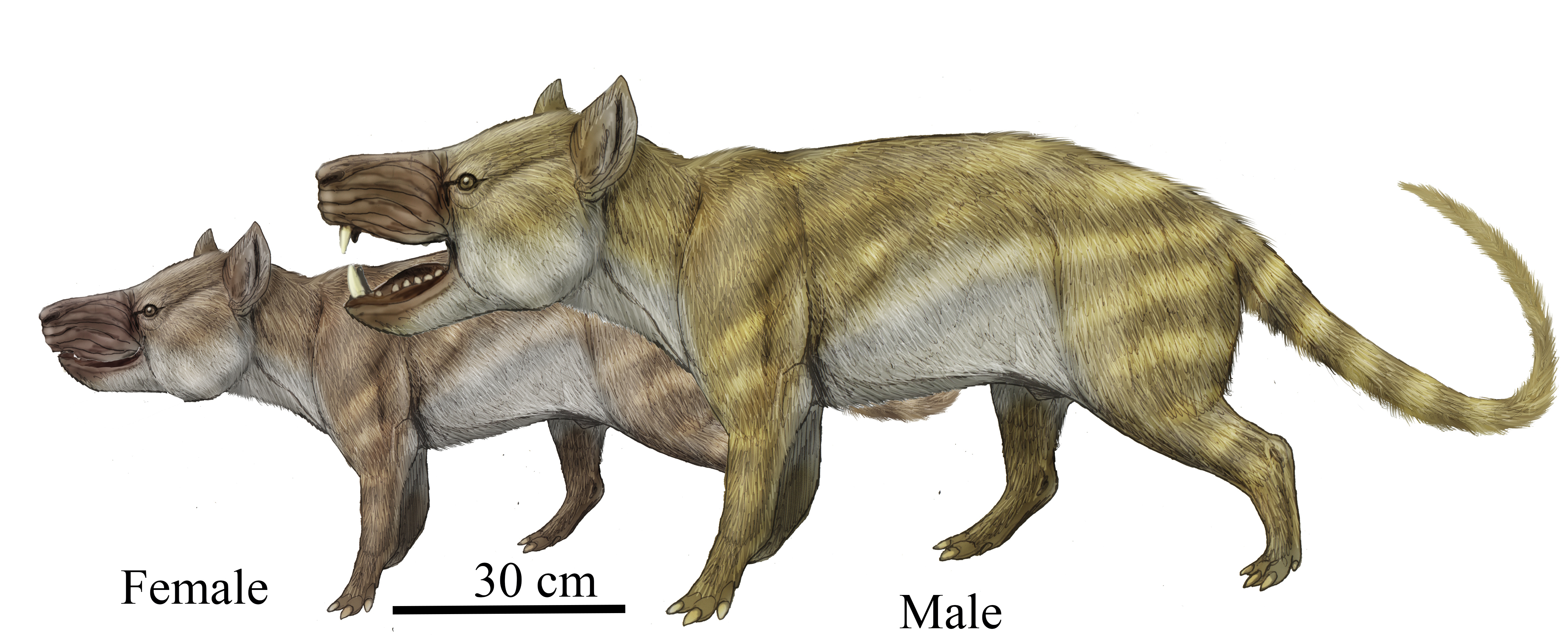
- Life restoration of a female and male

Scientific classification
- Kingdom: Animalia
- Phylum: Chordata
- Class: Mammalia
- Order: †Mesonychia
- Family: †Mesonychidae
- Genus: †Ankalagon; Van Valen, 1980
- Species: †A. saurognathus

Binomial name
- †Ankalagon saurognathus Van Valen, 1980

Synonyms
- Dissacus saurognathus Matthew, 1897

= Ankalagon =

Ankalagon Temporal range: Early-Middle Paleocene (Torrejonian), 62–61 Ma

Extinct carnivorous mesonychid mammal from New Mexico, United States

Ankalagon is an extinct genus of carnivorous mammal of the family Mesonychidae, endemic to North America during the Paleocene epoch. It is currently known from the latest Torrejonian (Tj6). There is only one known species: the type species Ankalagon saurognathus. Discovered in the Nacimiento Formation of New Mexico, Ankalagon is the largest mesonychid known from the Paleocene of North America and it provides the best evidence for sexual dimorphism in the group. However, its close relationship with Dissacus navajovius questions the validity of the genus, possibly being a species of Dissacus.

== Taxonomy ==
The generic name refers to the dragon Ancalagon, who was mentioned in The Silmarillion by J. R. R. Tolkien. In The Silmarillion, Ancalagon was described as being one of the more powerful servants of the malevolent being, Morgoth, having been bred to be the fiercest, mightiest, and largest dragon in all of Middle-earth. According to Tolkien, "Ancalagon" translates from Sindarin as being anc 'jaw', alag 'impetuous'. The species name, "saurognathus," translates as "lizard jaw."

Leigh Van Valen studied the New Mexico mesonychid in the genus Dissacus and eventually came to the conclusion that D. saurognathus differed enough from the sympatric D. navajovius, and from other members of the genus to merit its own genus. Van Valen attempted to erect the new genus "Ancalagon" for "Dissacus" saurognathus in 1978. However, he later found that the name was already occupied by Ancalagon minor, a Middle Cambrian priapulid worm described in 1977 by Simon Conway Morris. As a result, he renamed "Ancalagon" saurognathus to Ankalagon saurognathus in 1980. However, phylogenetic analysis found a close relationship to Dissacus navajovius, questioning the validity of Ankalagon as a genus.

== Description ==
The main feature that distinguishes Ankalagon from the ancestral Dissacus species is its size. It had a skull as large as a brown bear's but like other mesonychids, its body would have been proportionally smaller relative to the size of its skull, unlike in modern carnivorans, as compared to the coyote or jackal-sized species of Dissacus. In fact, the only North American mesonychids that surpassed Ankalagon in size were the larger species of the Early Eocene genus Pachyaena such as P. gigantea and P. ossifraga, which also grew to the size of bears.

Evidence of sexual dimorphism comes from an analysis of tooth and jaw size in two specimens of this genus, compared with unrelated, extant carnivorans (where the body size and sex of living individuals can be recorded and compared with their tooth size). Though the two Ankalagon jaws are of very different sizes and one has much larger canines, the first two molars are close in size. As the size of the first two molars varies little in individuals of the same species even when body size is different, the study suggests two conclusions:

- that these two adult individuals are of the same species, so Ankalagon had significant sexual dimorphism;
- that size/weight estimates of Ankalagon and other fossil mammals with sexual dimorphism may not be trustworthy, since estimates are usually made with a formula based on the size of the first two molar teeth, and these teeth may be the same size in individuals of much different body sizes.

== Paleoecology ==
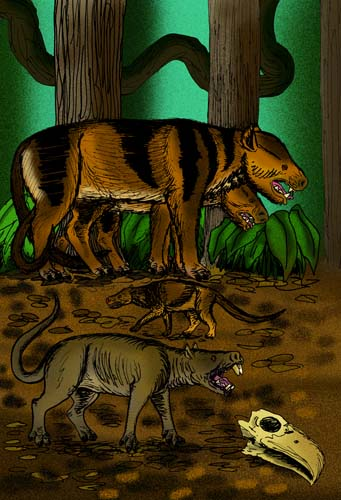
Comparison of Ankalagon (top) with Dissacus and Triisodon

The strong jaw musculature specialized for up-and-down biting rather than side-to-side grinding movement, and the triangular, laterally compressed premolars and molars with carnassial notches of Ankalagon are typical of mesonychids. Although no living group of animals has similar structures, these features suggest that this genus was carnivorous. Paleontologists believe that mesonychids would not have been able to slice meat as effectively as other carnivorous animals, but large genera like Ankalagon would have used their pointed teeth to grab a chunk of meat and their unusually strong jaw muscles to pull it free from a large carcass, perhaps bracing it with their front feet. Whether members of the genus were active hunters, scavengers, or both is unknown.

The evidence of sexual dimorphism in Ankalagon suggests that they formed either permanent social groups (like a pride of lions) or temporary associations (like a lek of grouse) of one male and several females. All living species of carnivorans as well as primates that show sexual dimorphism in canine size form mating groups of this type.
