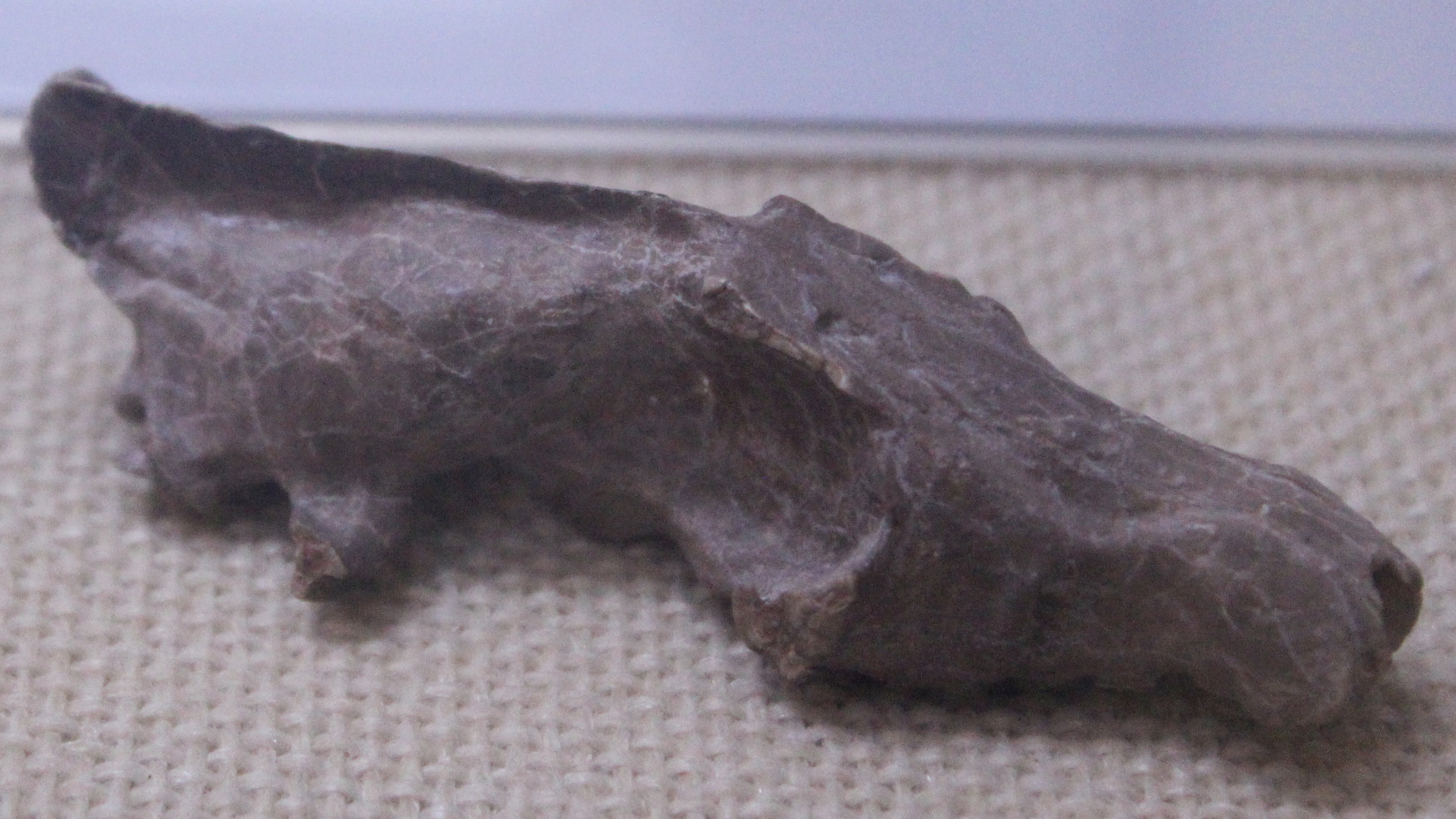
- Hapalodectes hetangensis (Hapalodectidae) skull

Scientific classification
- Kingdom: Animalia
- Phylum: Chordata
- Class: Mammalia
- Clade: Scrotifera
- Grandorder: Ferungulata
- Clade: Pan-Euungulata
- Order: †Mesonychia; Van Valen, 1969

Families
- †Hapalodectidae †Mesonychidae

Synonyms
- Acreodi (Rose, 2006); Mesonychidae (Cope, 1875)

= Mesonychia =

Mesonychia Temporal range: Early Paleocene—Late Eocene, 63–34 Ma Suspected Late Cretaceous origins
- Harpagolestes macrocephalus (Mesonychidae) skull reconstruction

Extinct order of mammals

Mesonychia ("middle claws"), sometimes referred as Acreodi, is an extinct order of small to large-sized omnivorous to carnivorous hoofed mammals related to ungulates. Originally, it was hypothesized that mesonychians were a group of ungulates, however recent analysis now found them to be outside of the group entirely. Instead they were a basal order of hoofed mammals within Pan-Euungulata. The order consisted of two families, Hapalodectidae and the more diverse and widespread Mesonychidae. It is believed that mesonychians evolved during the Late Cretaceous, at least 66.7 Ma.

Mesonychids, as well as mesonychians as a whole, first appeared in fossil record in the Early Paleocene of East Asia with Dissacus rotundus, Yantanglestes, Hukoutherium, and Dissacusium. Dissacus would later disperse into North America during the Early Paleocene, before dispersing into Northwestern Europe by the end of it. Dissacus was a jackal-sized predator, but taxon of a closely related or identical genus, Ankalagon, from the early to middle Paleocene of New Mexico, were far larger, growing to the size of a bear. A later genus, Pachyaena, entered North America by the earliest Eocene, where it evolved into species that were at least as large. Mesonychids were largest predatory mammals in North America and Europe during the Late Paleocene to Middle Eocene. In Asia, the record of their history suggests they grew gradually larger and more predatory over time, then shifted to scavenging and bone-crushing lifestyle.

During the Middle Eocene, mesonychians saw a decline in diversity across their distribution. Originally, it was suggested mesonychids, such as Mongolestes, survived into the Early Oligocene. This has later found to be questionable as the Ulan Gochu Formation of Mongolia has been revised to the late Middle to earliest Late Eocene. The latest occurrence of the order was within the Ergilin Dzo Formation. The extinction of the order was thought to have been the result of changing environments, not competition with replacement clades such as hyaenodonts and carnivoramorphans.

== Taxonomy ==
=== Classification ===
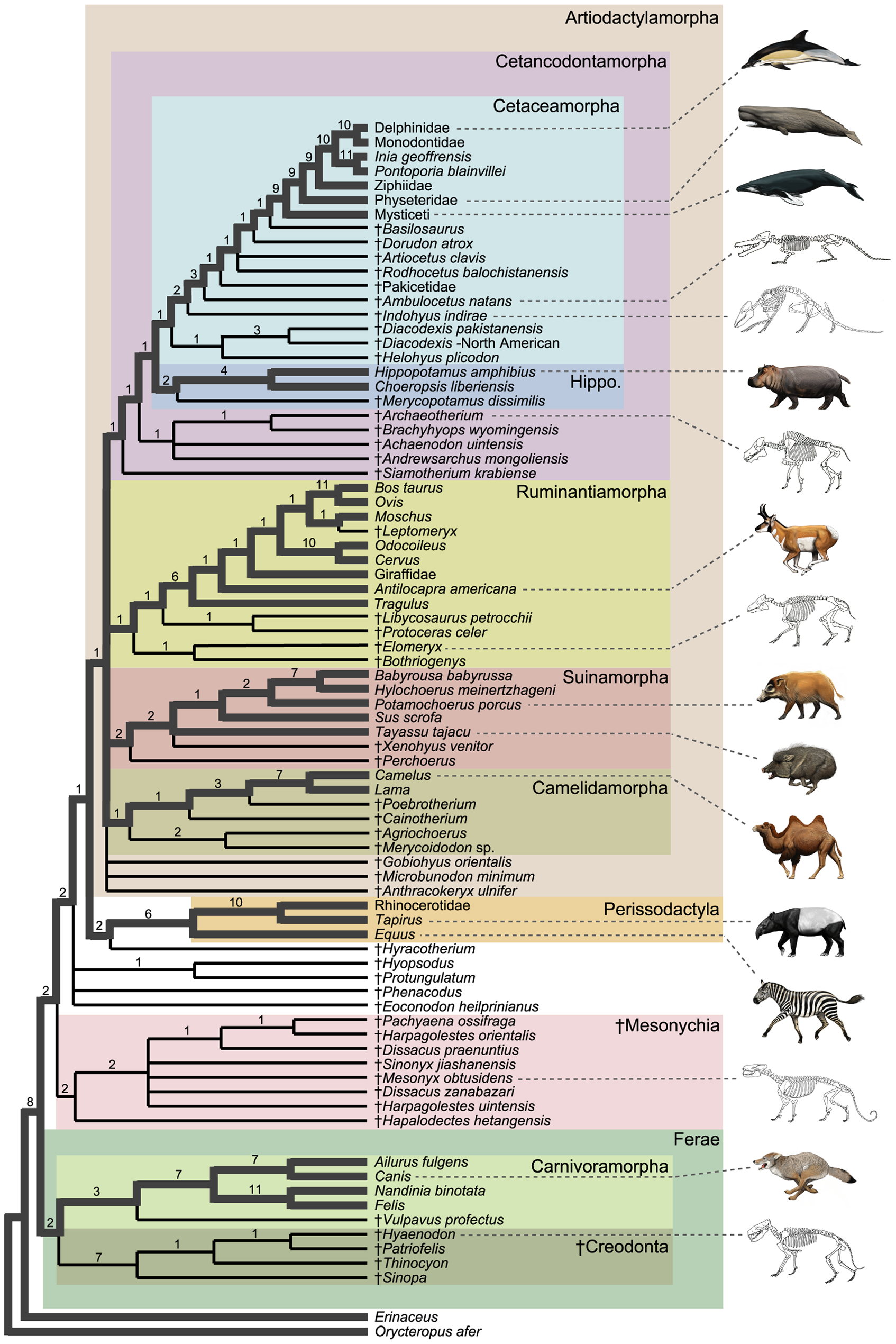
Cladogram showing the position of the Mesonychia

Cope (1875) first classified mesonychids as Carnivora due to the trochelar face of the astragalus is completely grooved. However, in a later paper, Cope reclassified mesonychids as Creodonta. Matthew (1909) would classify mesonychids classified within the suborder Acreodi of Creodonta. In their 1966 paper, Van Valen removed mesonychids from creodonts and placed them within the order Condylarthra. Szalay and Gould (1966) would support this classification within their paper. In 1969, Van Valen suggested mesonychids were a separate order of mammals closely related to Artiodactyla, known as Mesonychia.

Ting and Li (1987) and Zhou et al. (1995) suggested Hapalodectidae as a separate family of mesonychians, a classification supported by phylogenetic modeling. Some genera may need revision to clarify the actual number of species or remove ambiguity about genera (such as Dissacus and Ankalagon). In 2023, Solé and colleagues reclassified nearly all European species of Dissacus as the newly revived Hyaenodictis. Additionally, the North American species, "Dissacus" willwoodensis, was also reclassified as Hyaenodictis. Within the same study, they noted the close relation between Ankalagon and Dissacus navajovius, which suggests the former may be a large species of Dissacus.

==== Relationship with Triisodontidae ====
When Scott (1894) described Triisodontidae, he noted the family was possibly closely related to mesonychids. Triisodontids were considered to have been a subfamily of mesonychids by Matthew (1907), although they were later moved to Arctocyonidae. However, McKenna and Bell (1997) would reclassify them as a family of mesonychians. Szalay (1969) suggested triisodontids were ancestral to mesonychians due to the difference in their dentition. Phylogenetic analysis by Tabuce et al. (2011) recovered mesonychians as a monophyletic group within Acreodi, with triisodontids being a paraphyletic stem to mesonychians.

Sarah et al. (2015) recovered mesonychians as basal ungulates most closely related to the "arctocyonids" Mimotricentes, Deuterogonodon and Chriacus. Within the abstract, they also recovered triisodontids as paraphyletic stem to mesonychians. However, majority of phylogenetic analyses have recovered mesonychians outside of ungulates entirely, with triisodontids being more closely related to ungulates than to mesonychians.

==== Relationship with whales ====
Mesonychians possess unusual triangular molar teeth that are similar to those of Cetacea (whales and dolphins), especially those of the archaeocetes, as well as having similar skull anatomies and other morphologic traits. For this reason, scientists had long believed that mesonychians were the direct ancestor of Cetacea, but the discovery of well-preserved hind limbs of archaic cetaceans, as well as more recent phylogenetic analyses disprove this, and this result is consistent with many molecular studies. The similarity in dentition and skull may be the result of primitive ungulate structures in related groups independently evolving to meet similar needs as predators; some researchers have suggested that the absence of a first toe and a reduced metatarsal are basal features (synapomorphies) indicating that mesonychians, perissodactyls, and artiodactyls are sister groups.

Most paleontologists now doubt that whales are descended from mesonychians. Some experts have hypothesized mesonychians were basal ungulates, and that cetaceans are descended from advanced ungulates (Artiodactyla), either deriving from, or sharing a common ancestor with, anthracotheres (the semiaquatic ancestors of hippos). However, mesonychians being recovered within ungulates in cladistic analyses only surfaces following the deletion of Andrewsarchus, which has been recovered as a mesonychid within the cladogram. One possible conclusion is that Andrewsarchus has been incorrectly classified. The current uncertainty may, in part, reflect the fragmentary nature of the remains of some crucial fossil taxa, such as Andrewsarchus. Current analysis recovered Andrewsarchus as a basal Cetancodontamorpha being closely related to entelodonts, cetaceans, and hippopotamuses. Spaulding et al. (2009) only recovered mesonychians being closely related to cetaceans, following the deletion of Carnivora, "Creodonta", "Lipotyphia", and Raoellidae.

Cladogram recovered by Spaulding et al. (2009), which recovered the order outside of ungulates entirely:

- - - †Hapalodectes
    - - †Sinonyx
      - †Mesonyx
      - †Harpagolestes uintensis
      - †Dissacus zanabazari
      - - †Dissacus praenuntius
        - - †Harpagolestes orientalis
          - †Pachyaena
  - - †Protungulatum
    - - Perissodactyla
      - Artiodactyla
        - Tylopoda
        - - Suina
          - - Ruminantia
            - - †Entelodontidae
              - - - †Anthracotheriidae
                  - Hippopotamidae
                - - †Raoellidae
                  - Cetacea

=== Evolution ===
Mesonychians were believed to have evolved during the Late Cretaceous period, at least 66.7 Ma, with both families were thought to have originate in the Late Cretaceous based on phylogenetic analysis. The earliest known mesonychians fossils were dated to 63 Ma. In East Asia, mesonychids were known from East Asia during the Early Paleocene and were represented by Dissacus rotundus, Yantanglestes, Hukoutherium, and Dissacusium. Within North America, Dissacus appeared during the late Torrejonian and was contemporary with the "triisodontid" Triisodon, with Ankalagon appearing during the latest Torrejonian. The presence of mesonychids in Asia and in North America suggests mesonychids initial radiation began in the Early Paleocene. Hapalodectids first appeared in the fossil record during the Middle Paleocene in Asia. Before the end of the Paleocene, mesonychids would disperse into Europe with the appearance of Dissacus europaeus. Hapalodectids would disperse into North America during the Paleocene-Eocene Thermal Maximum, which saw the appearance of Hapalodectes anthracinus.

=== Extinction ===
The disappearance of Dissacus was contemporary with the appearance of Pachyaena and Palaeonictis, although competition is unlikely to have been the reason for the extinction of Dissacus europaeus. European Pachyaena would go extinct 55 Ma, being replaced by European Hyaenodictis, following the Intra-European Faunal Turnover. Hapalodectids would go extinct near the end of Early Eocene, roughly 49 Ma. European mesonychids would go extinct 48 Ma, which was contemporary with the Ypresian-Lutetian Mammal Turnover event. The cause of the turnover event likely coincided with the cooling period following the Early Eocene Climatic Optimum. Following the extinction of European mesonychians and oxyaenids, hyaenodonts saw a diversification in species and body sizes. Hapalodectids would go extinct during the Middle Eocene roughly 44 Ma.

== Characteristics ==
Mesonychians have often been reconstructed as resembling wolves albeit superficially, but they would have appeared very different in life. With a short lower spine stiffened by revolute joints, they would have run with stiff backs like modern ungulates rather than bounding or loping with flexible spines like modern carnivorans. While later mesonychians evolved a suite of limb adaptations for running similar to those in both wolves and deer, their legs remained comparatively thick. They would have resembled no group of living animals. Early mesonychians probably walked on the flats of their feet (plantigrade), while later ones walked on their toes (digitigrade). These later mesonychians had hooves, one on each toe, with four toes on each foot. The foot was compressed for efficient running with the axis between the third and fourth toes (paraxonic); it would have looked something like a hoofed paw.

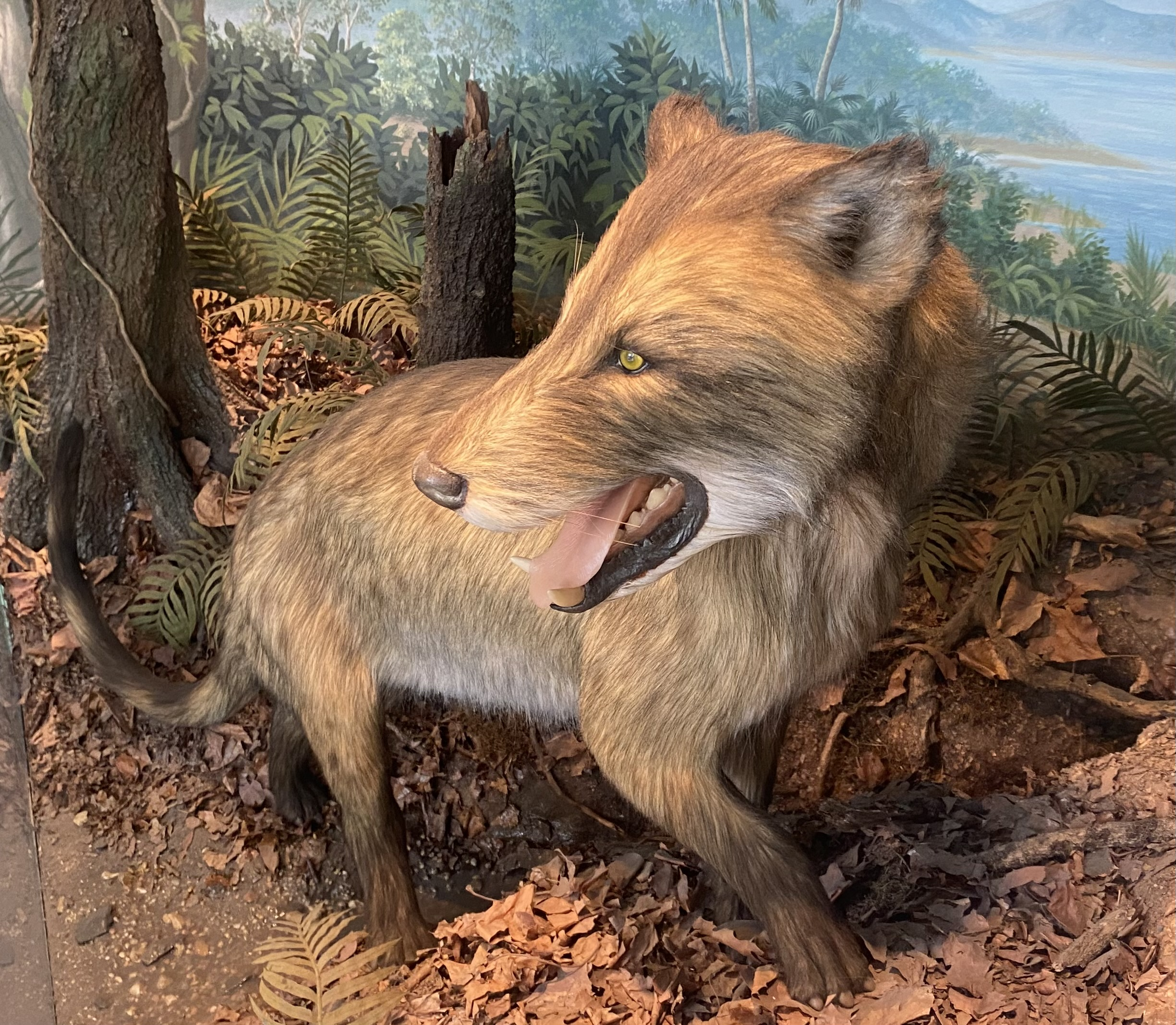
Mesonyx model reconstruction at the Natural History Museum, London

Mesonychians varied in size; some species were as small as a fox, although some species approached the size of moderately sized bears. Some members of the group are known only from skulls and jaws, or have fragmentary postcranial remains. But where skeletons are known, they indicate that mesonychians had large heads with strong jaw muscles, relatively long necks, and robust bodies with robust limbs that could run effectively but not rotate the hand or reach out to the side. An unrelated early group of mammalian predators, the creodonts, also had unusually large heads and limbs that traded flexibility for efficiency in running; large head size may be connected to inability to use the feet and claws to help catch and process food, as many modern carnivorans do. There is evidence to suggest that some genera were sexually dimorphic.

== Paleobiology ==
=== Locomotion ===
Postcranial analysis on Pachyaena found all three species had many adaptations for running, including paraxonic compressed feet with a vestigial first digit, lower sections of the limbs elongated compared with the upper sections, and limb joints with movement mostly restricted to a sagittal plane (back-and-forth movement). All these characteristics are common to both ungulates that run to escape predators and carnivores that run to pursue prey, though they probably evolved independently in mesonychids. Some adaptations are more typical of the grade of cursorial carnivores; others are more specialized, as in ungulates. However, Pachyaena was likely built for endurance rather than speed. Compared to cursorial carnivorans such as spotted hyenas, Pachyaena was relatively short-limbed suggesting it couldn’t have attained the speeds seen in hyenas. Pachyaena was found to have plantigrade or secondarily subdigitgrade locomotion. Dissacus europaeus was also found to have been a cursorial animal, with elbow morphology suggesting it was specialized for running than other contemporary mammals.

=== Ecology ===
Szalay and Gould (1966) recovered five adaptive levels of mesonychians: carnivore, hypercarnivore, omnivorous-carnivore, omnivorous, and bone-crushing level. However, following the exclusion of Andrewsarchus, experts have considered there to only be four adaptive levels. Zhou et al. (1992) suggested no mesonychid were hypercarnivores due to the lack of carnassials, instead they hypothesized mesonychids likely scavengers and rarely, if ever, ate fresh carrion. Valkenburgh (1999) suggested mesonychids were probably one of the more important predator groups within the Late Paleocene and Eocene ecosystems of Eurasia and North America.

Dental microwear analysis on Dissacus praenuntius found prior to the Paleocene-Eocene Thermal Maximum (PETM), the mesonychid was a cheetah-like faunivore that consumed relatively few bones. During and after the PETM, dental microwear patterns resembled more of lions and brown hyenas, suggesting an increase in bone consumption, as well as other hard items such as insects, fruits, and vegetation.
