= List of the prehistoric life of Wyoming =

This list of the prehistoric life of Wyoming contains the various prehistoric life-forms whose fossilized remains have been reported from within the US state of Wyoming.

== Precambrian ==
The Paleobiology Database records no known occurrences of Precambrian fossils in Alabama. (Why is Alabama the focus in an article about Wyoming?)

== Paleozoic ==
=== Selected Paleozoic taxa of Wyoming ===
- †Actinoceras
- †Agassizodus
  - †Agassizodus variabilis
- †Agnostogonus
- †Amphiscapha
- †Amplexus
  - †Anarthraspis chamberlini
- †Archaeocidaris
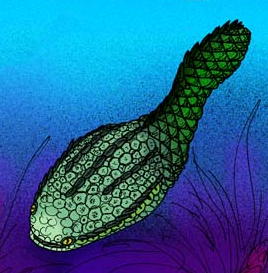
- Life restoration of the Middle-Late Ordovician jawless fish Astraspis
  †Astraspis
  - †Astraspis desiderata
- †Aviculopecten
  - †Aviculopecten basilicus – or unidentified comparable form
  - †Aviculopecten girtyi
  - †Aviculopecten gryphus
  - †Aviculopecten kaibabensis – or unidentified comparable form
- †Bellerophon
- †Blountiella
- †Bowmania
- †Bucheria – type locality for genus
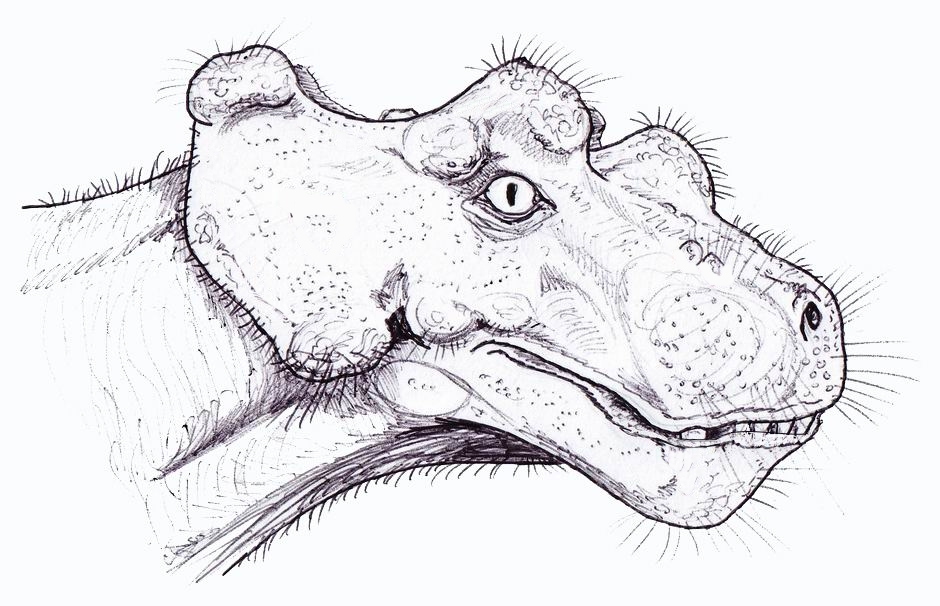
- Restorative portrait of the Permian synapsid (mammal precursor) Burnetia
  †Burnetia
- †Campodus
- †Caninia
- †Cardipeltis
  - †Cardipeltis wallacii
- †Catenipora
- †Cavusgnathus
- †Cedaria
- †Cephalaspis
- †Charactoceras – tentative report
- †Chirognathus
- †Chonetes
- †Cleiothyridina
  - †Cleiothyridina atrypoides
  - †Cleiothyridina elegans – or unidentified related form
  - †Cleiothyridina hirsuta
  - †Cleiothyridina sublamellosa – or unidentified related form
- †Coleodus
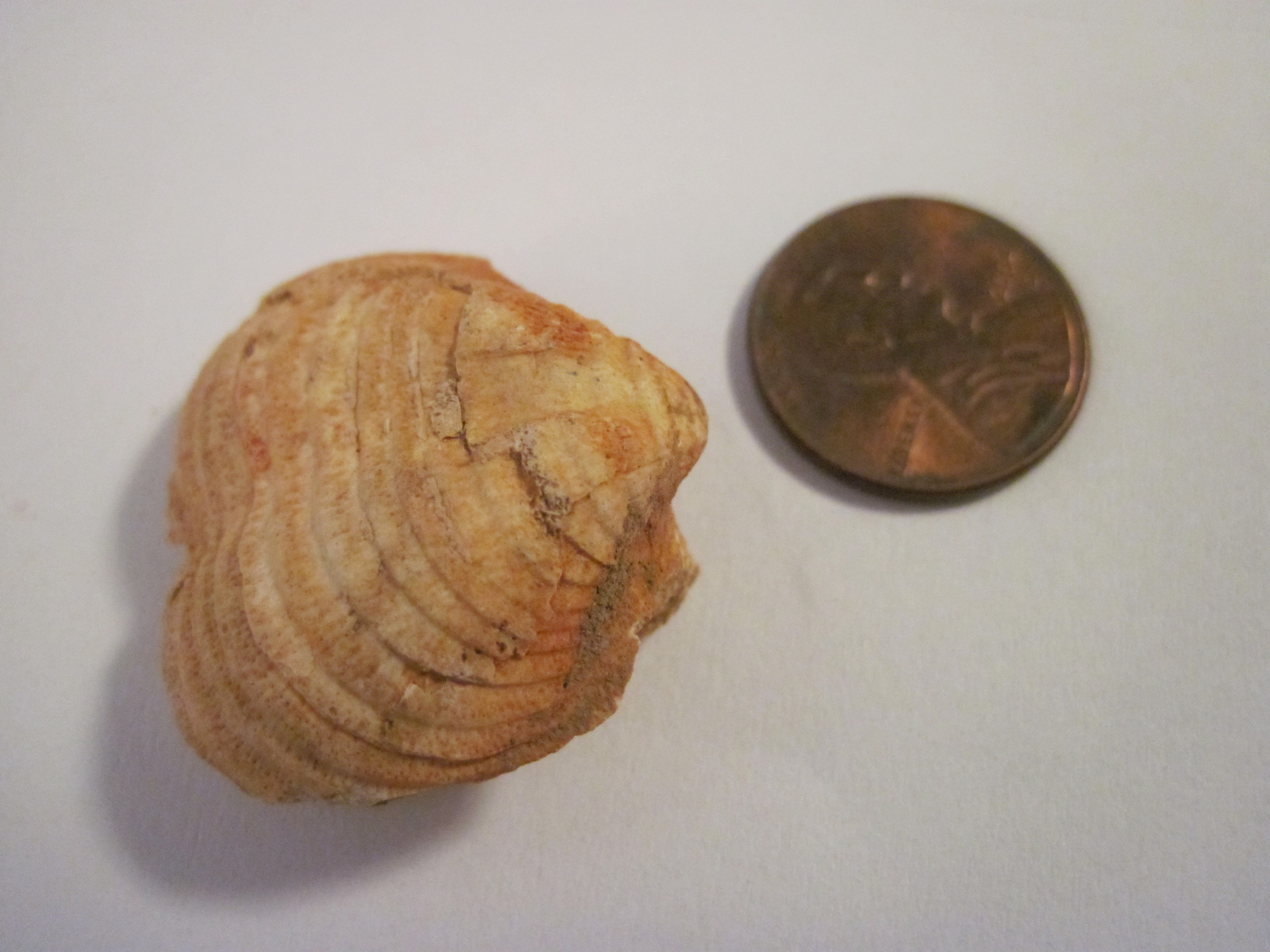
- Fossilized shell of the Late Devonian-Permian brachiopod Composita
  †Composita
  - †Composita elongata
  - †Composita laevis – or unidentified related form
  - †Composita mira
  - †Composita ovata
  - †Composita sigma
  - †Composita subquadrata
  - †Composita subtilita
  - †Composita sulcata
- †Conocardium
- †Coosella
- †Coosia
- †Coosina
- †Cordylodus
- †Crepicephalus
- †Ctenacanthus
  - †Ctenacanthus amblyxiphias
- †Cyrtogomphoceras
- †Deckera
- †Dentalium
- †Distichophytum
- †Drepanophycus
- †Earlandia
- †Edmondia
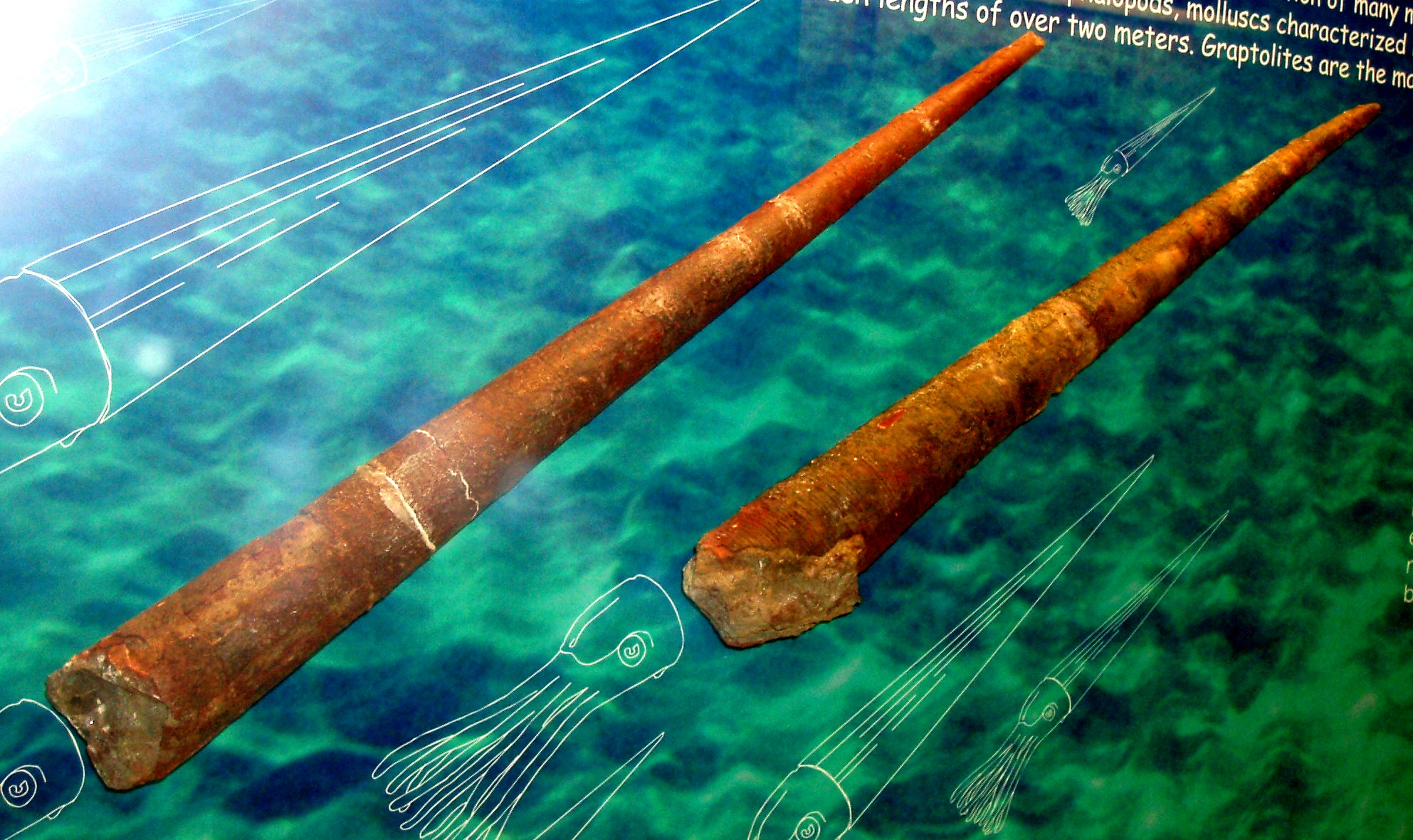
- Fossilized shells and restored appearances of the Middle-Late Ordovician nautiloid cephalopod Endoceras
  †Endoceras
- †Euomphalus
- †Favosites
- †Gastrioceras – report made of unidentified related form or using admittedly obsolete nomenclature
- †Genevievella
- †Geragnostus
- †Girvanella
- †Glikmanius
  - †Glikmanius occidentalis
- †Glyptopleura
- †Goniatites – tentative report
- †Gosslingia
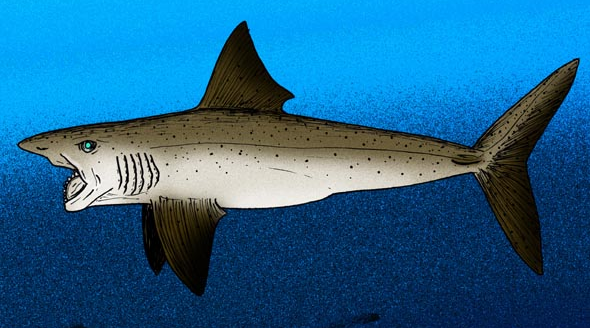
- Life restoration of the Permian Chimaera relative Helicoprion
  †Helicoprion
  - †Helicoprion davisii
- †Homagnostus
- †Hyolithes
- †Hypseloconus
- †Idiognathoides
- †Ithyektyphus
- †Janassa
- †Kendallina
- †Kingstonia
- †Kionoceras
- †Kochoceras
- †Lambeoceras
- † Leclercqia
- †Lingula
- †Lingulella
- †Liroceras
- †Lonchocephalus
- †Maryvillia
- †Metacoceras
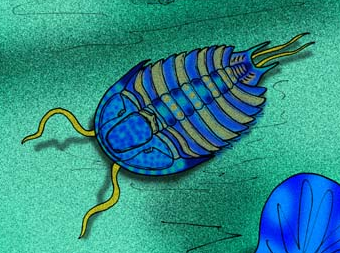
- Restoration of the Cambrian trilobite Meteoraspis
  †Meteoraspis
- †Micromitra
- †Minicephalus – type locality for genus
- †Naticopsis
  - †Naticopsis judithae
  - †Naticopsis kaibabensis
  - †Naticopsis marthaae – or unidentified comparable form
- †Neospirifer
  - †Neospirifer bakeri
- Nucula – tentative report
- †Olenoides
- †Ozarkodina
- †Paladin
- †Paractinoceras
- †Peripetoceras
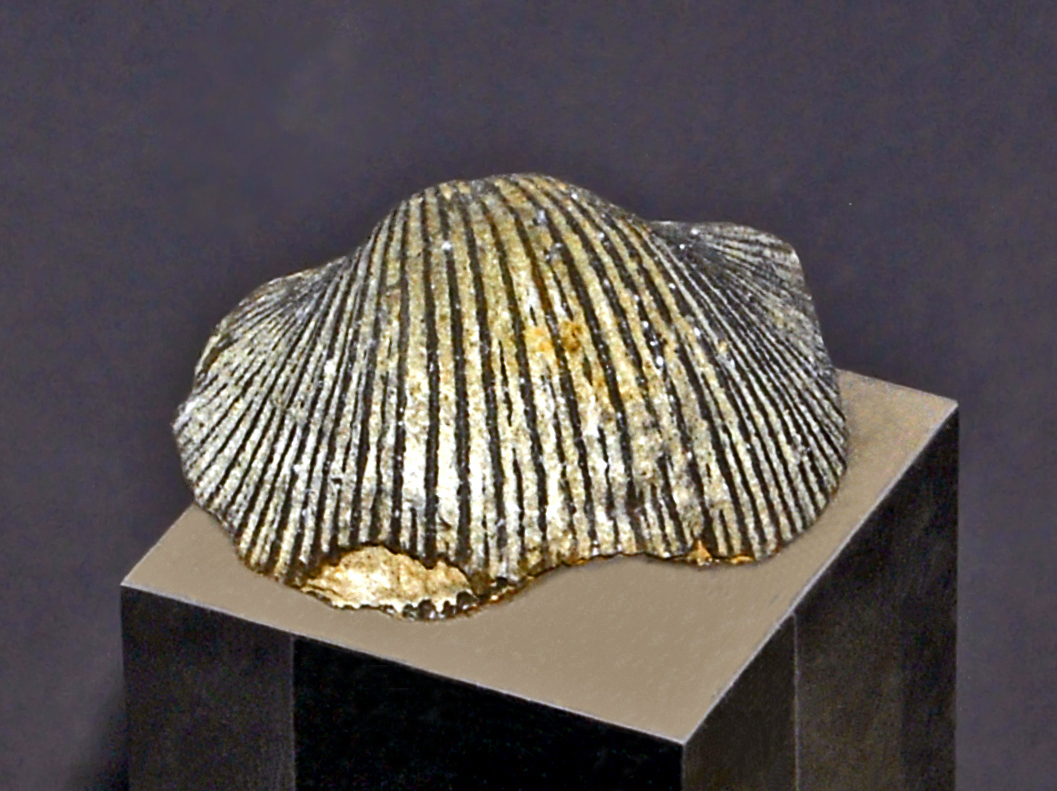
- Fossilized shell of the Ordovician brachiopod Plaesiomys
  †Plaesiomys
- †Platyceras
- †Platystrophia
- †Posidonia
- †Prodentalium
- †Protaspis
- †Pseudomelania – tentative report
- †Psilophyton
- †Rawlinsella
- †Renalia
- †Sallya
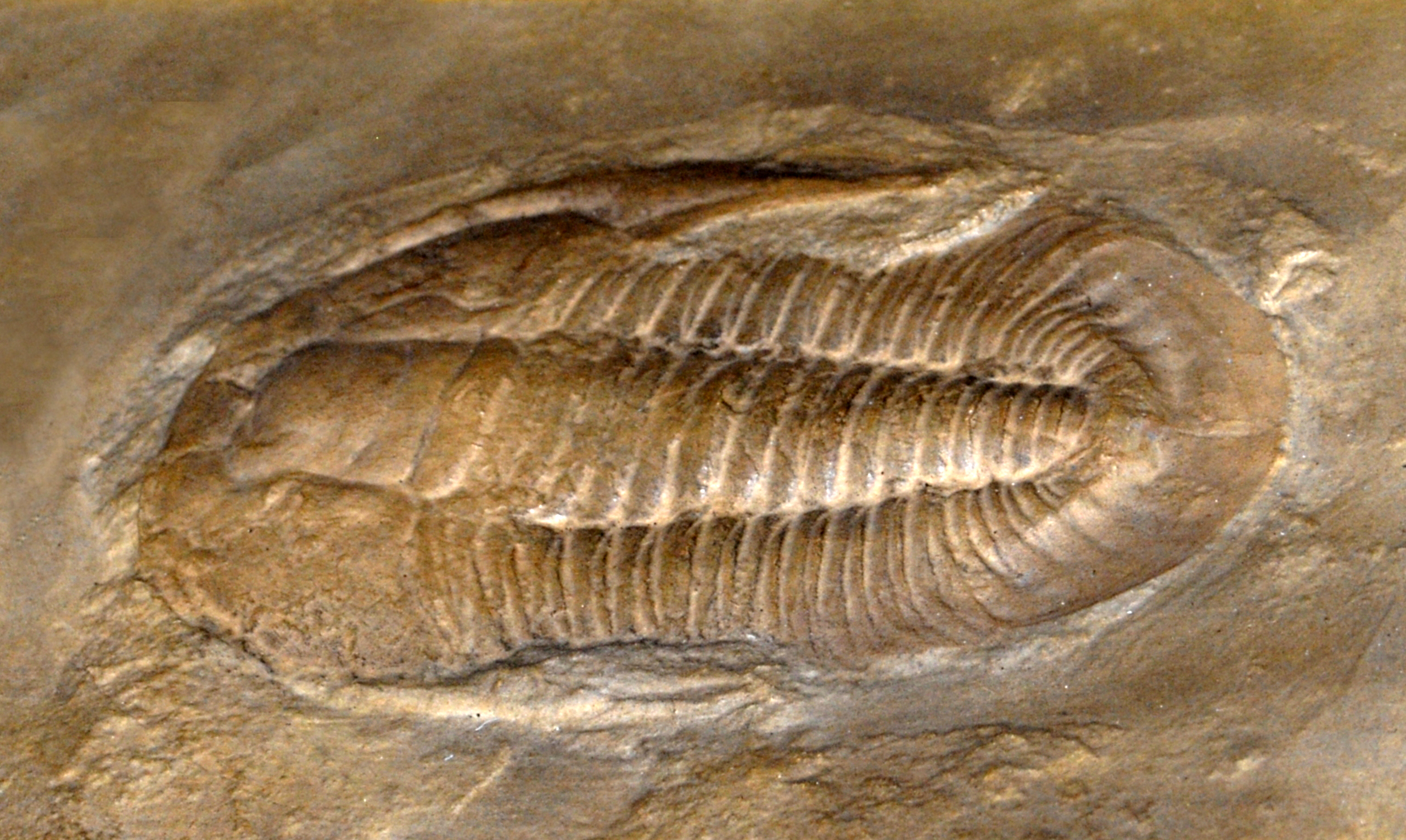
- Fossil of the Cambrian-Ordovician trilobite Saukiella
  †Saukiella
- †Sawdonia
- Solemya
- †Solenochilus
- †Spiriferina
- †Spyroceras
- †Stearoceras
- †Streptognathodus
- †Strophomena
- †Syspacheilus
- †Tainoceras
- †Tetrataxis
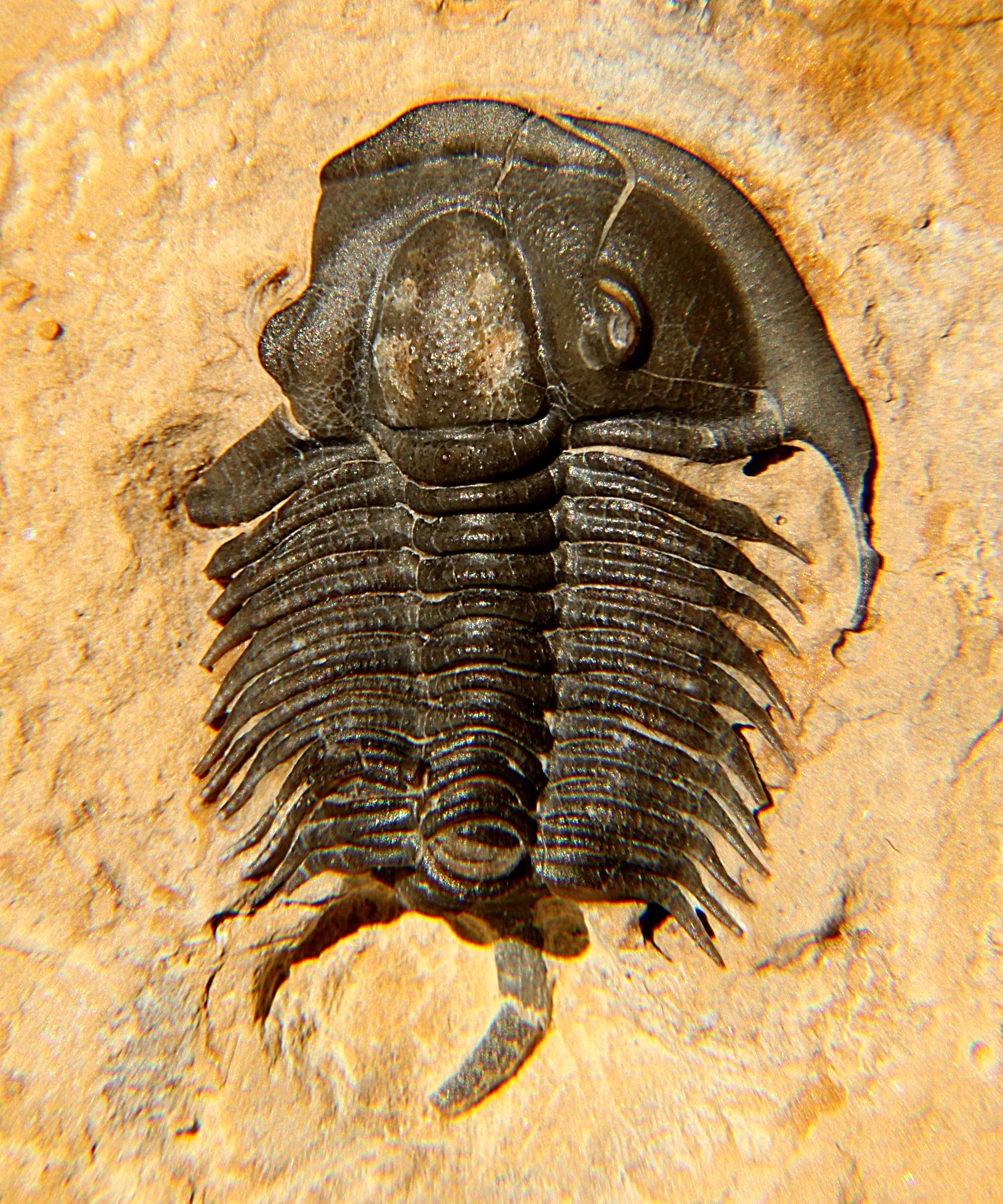
- Fossil of the Cambrian trilobite Tricrepicephalus
  †Tricrepicephalus
- †Uncaspis
- †Uranolophus
- †Westonoceras
- †Wilkingia
- †Winnipegoceras
- †Worthenia
- †Zellerina

== Mesozoic ==
=== Selected Mesozoic taxa of Wyoming ===
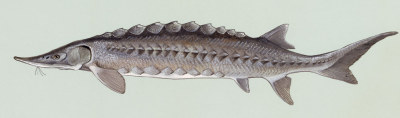
- Illustration of a living Acipenser sturgeon
  Acipenser
- †Adocus
- †Agathaumas – type locality for genus
  - †Agathaumas sylvestris – type locality for species
- †Agerostrea
- †Albanerpeton
  - †Albanerpeton galaktion
  - †Albanerpeton nexuosus – type locality for species
- †Albertosaurus – or unidentified comparable form
- †Allognathosuchus
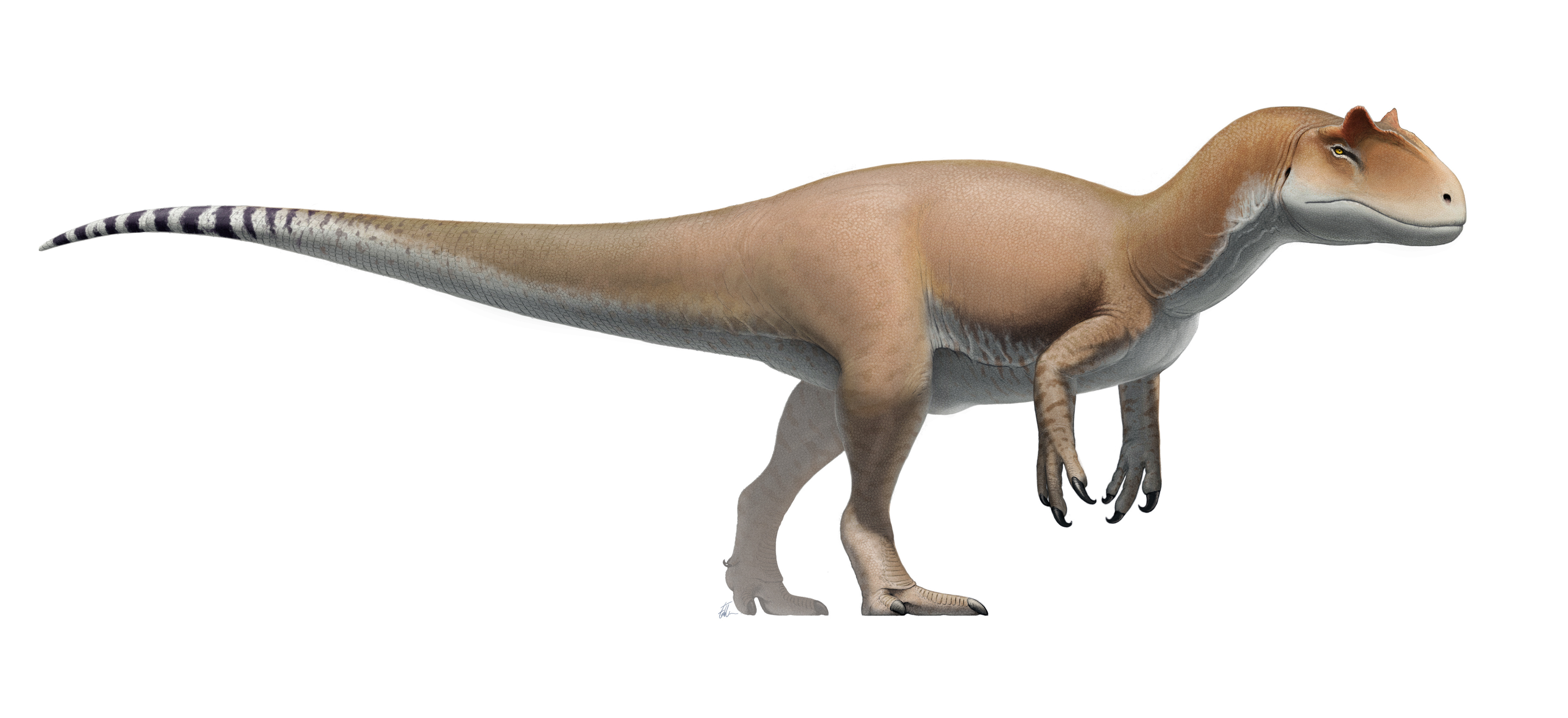
- Life restoration of the Late Jurassic theropod dinosaur Allosaurus
  †Allosaurus – type locality for genus
  - †Allosaurus fragilis – type locality for species
- †Alphadon
  - †Alphadon attaragos – type locality for species
  - †Alphadon halleyi
  - †Alphadon marshi
  - †Alphadon sahnii
- †Amblotherium – type locality for genus
- Amia
- †Amphicoelias
  - †Amphicoelias brontodiplodocus – type locality for species
- †Amphidon – type locality for genus
  - †Amphidon superstes – type locality for species
- †Anaklinoceras
- †Anaschisma – type locality for genus
- †Ancorichnus
- †Andromeda
- †Anemia
- †Angistorhinus – type locality for genus
  - †Angistorhinus aeolamnis – type locality for species
  - †Angistorhinus gracilis – type locality for species
  - †Angistorhinus grandis – type locality for species
  - †Angistorhinus maximus – type locality for species
- †Anisoceras
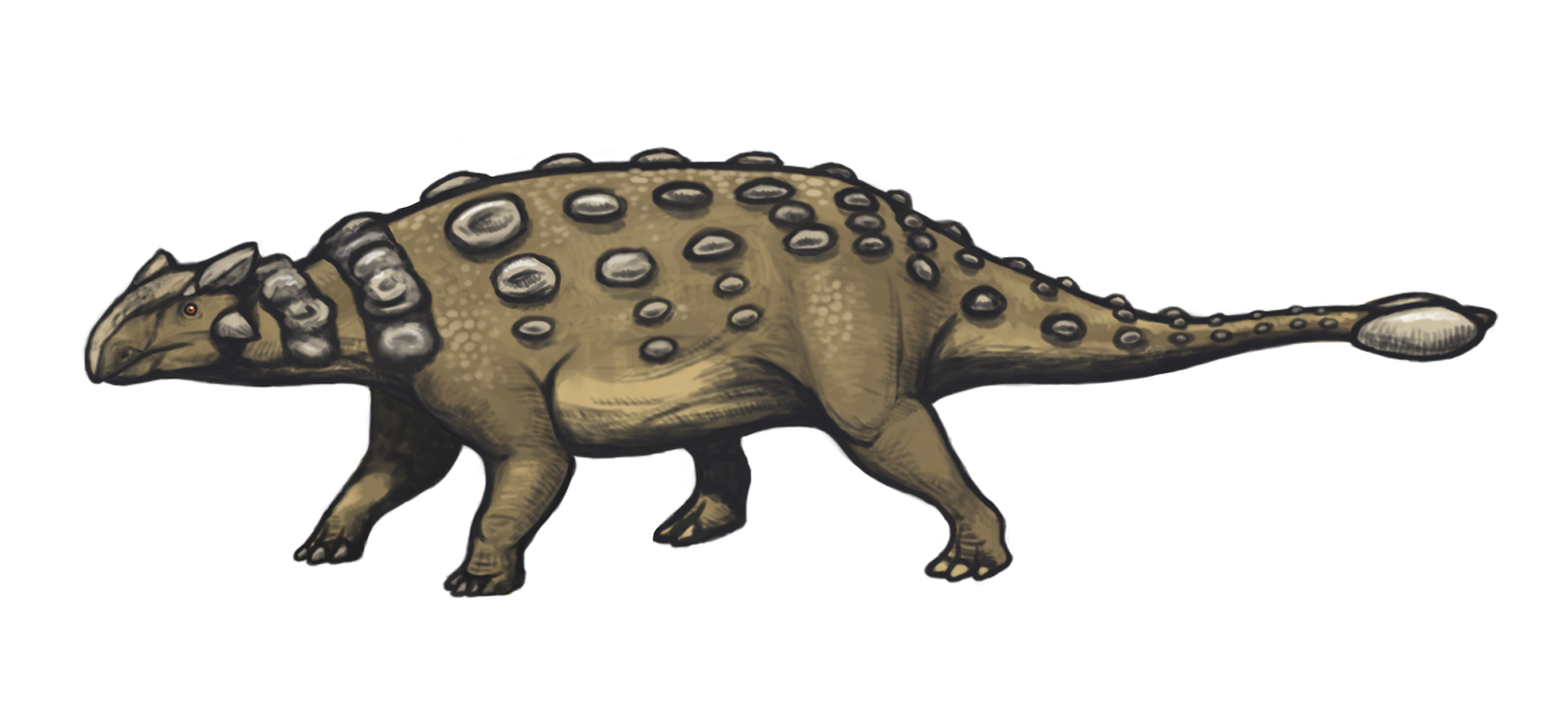
- Life restoration of the Late Cretaceous armored dinosaur Ankylosaurus
  †Ankylosaurus
  - †Ankylosaurus magniventris
- Anomia
- Anona
- Antrimpos
- †Apatosaurinae
- †Apatosaurus
  - †Apatosaurus louisae
  - †Apatosaurus minimus
- †Aploconodon – type locality for genus
  - †Aploconodon comoensis – type locality for species
- Aporrhais
- †Aquilina – type locality for genus
- Aralia
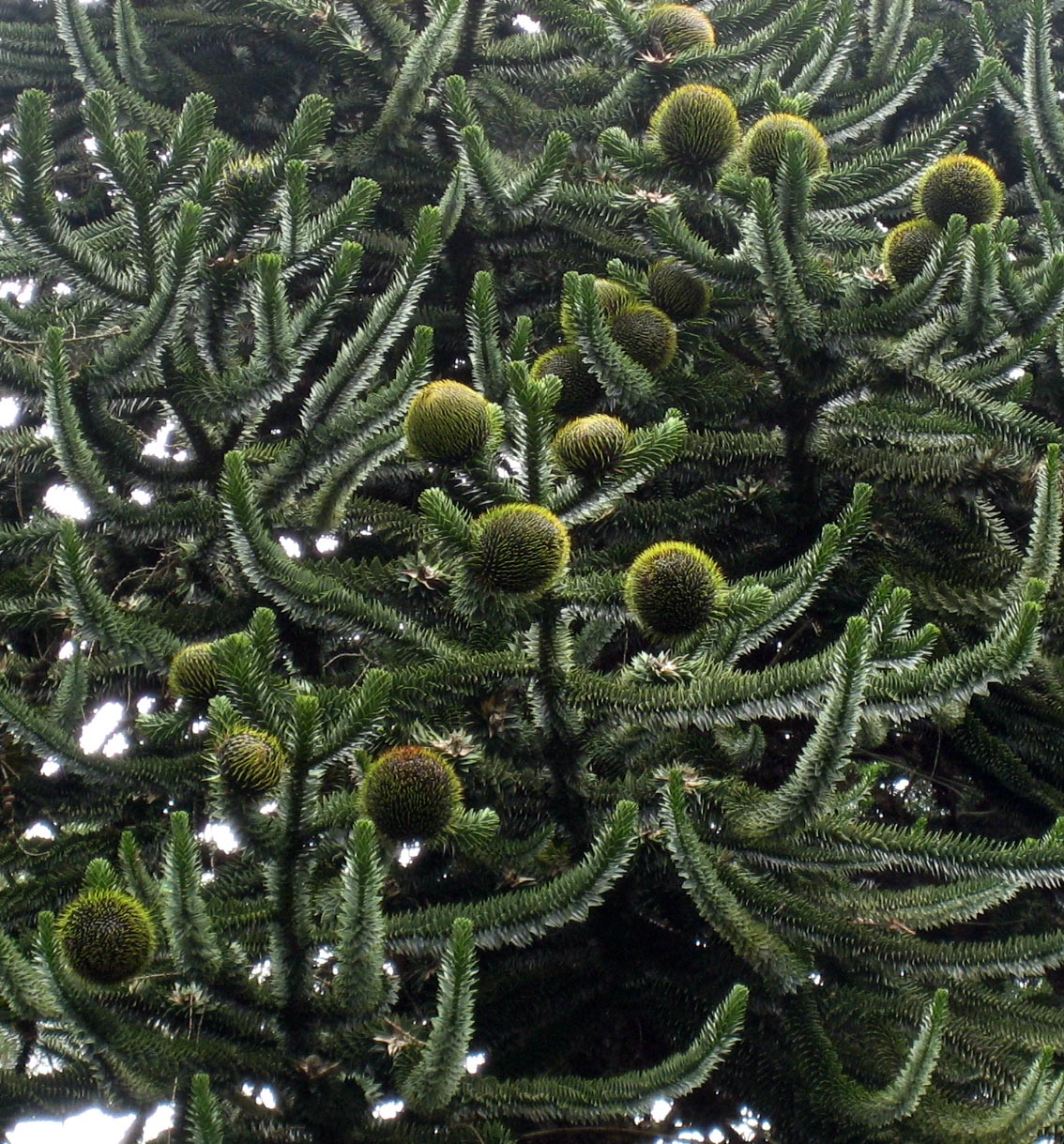
- Foliage and cones of a living Araucaria tree
  Araucaria
- Arca – report made of unidentified related form or using admittedly obsolete nomenclature
- †Archaeotrigon – type locality for genus
- †Arcticoceras
- †Arenicolites
- Aspideretes
- †Asplenium
- †Astarta
- Astarte
- † Atira – tentative report
- †Atokatheridium – or unidentified comparable form
- †Aublysodon
  - †Aublysodon mirandus
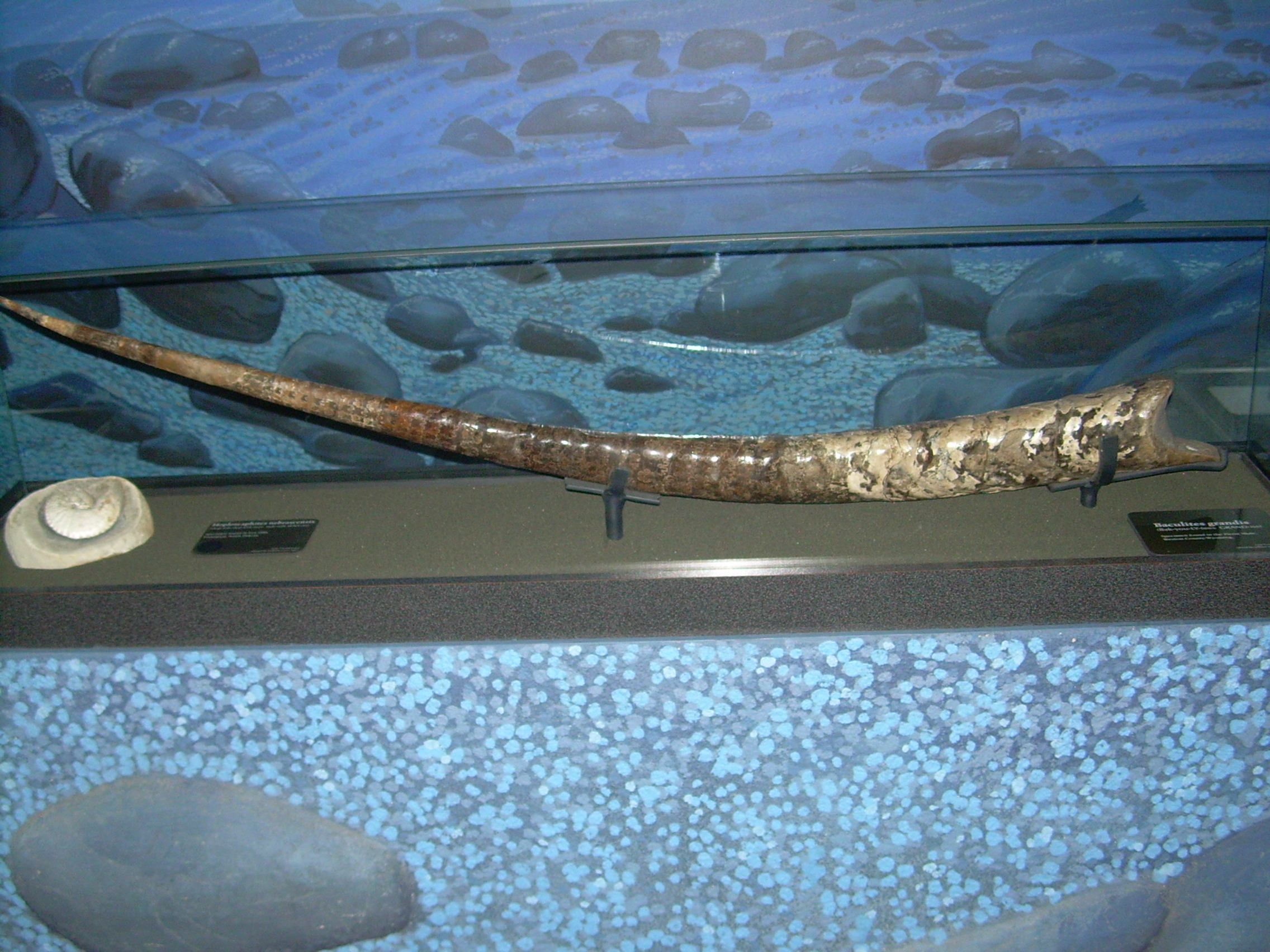
- Fossilized shell of the Late Cretaceous ammonoid cephalopod Baculites
  †Baculites
  - †Baculites asper
  - †Baculites asperiformis
  - †Baculites baculus
  - †Baculites clinolobatus
  - †Baculites cobbani
  - †Baculites codyensis
  - †Baculites crickmayi
  - †Baculites elaisi
  - †Baculites eliasi
  - †Baculites gilberti
  - †Baculites grandis
  - †Baculites gregoryensis
  - †Baculites haresi
  - †Baculites jenseni – or unidentified comparable form
  - †Baculites mariasensis
  - †Baculites mclearni
  - †Baculites obtusus
  - †Baculites perplexus
  - †Baculites reesidei
  - †Baculites rugosus
  - †Baculites scotti
- †Baena
- †Baptanodon
- Barbatia – tentative report
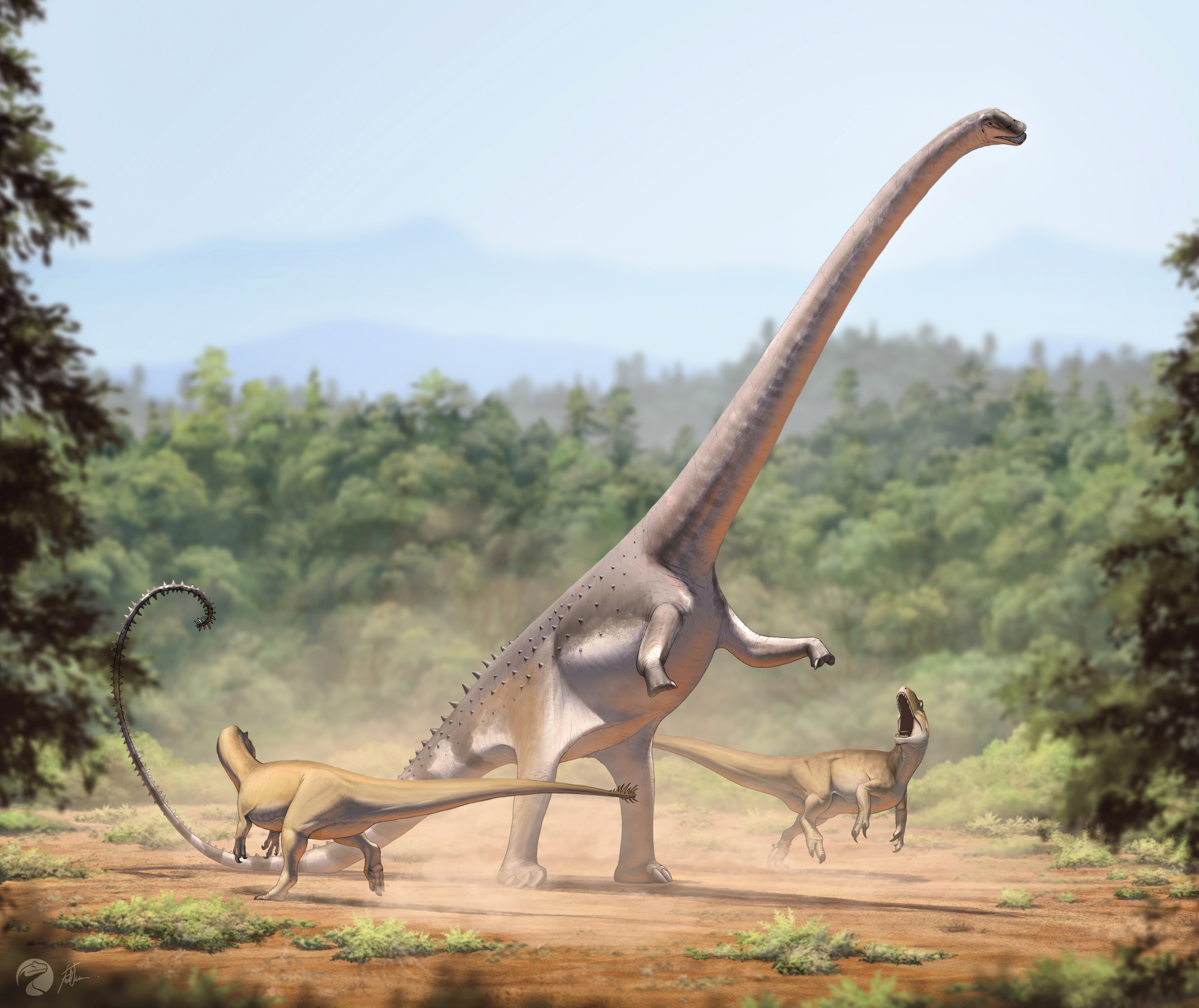
- Restoration of the Late Jurassic sauropod dinosaur Barosaurus rearing to defend itself against a pair of the theropod Allosaurus
  †Barosaurus
  - †Barosaurus lentus
- †Basilemys
- †Belonostomus
  - †Belonostomus longirostris
- Bombur
- †Borealosuchus
  - †Borealosuchus sternbergii – type locality for species
- Botula
  - †Botula ripleyana
- Brachaelurus
- †Brachiosaurus
- †Brachybrachium – type locality for genus
  - †Brachybrachium brevipes – type locality for species
- †Brachychampsa
  - †Brachychampsa montana
- †Brachyphyllum
- †Brontopodus – or unidentified comparable form
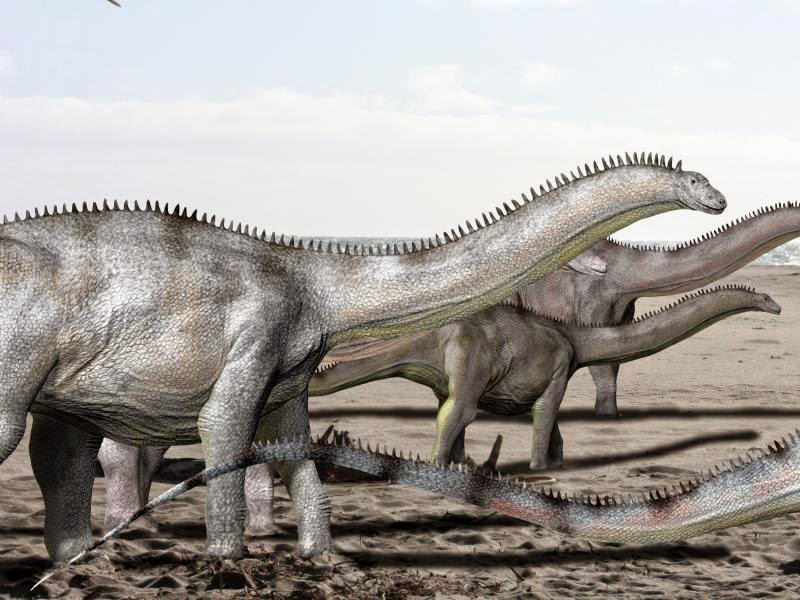
- Life restoration of a herd of the Late Jurassic sauropod dinosaur Brontosaurus
  †Brontosaurus – type locality for genus
  - †Brontosaurus excelsus – type locality for species
  - †Brontosaurus parvus – type locality for species
  - †Brontosaurus yahnahpin – type locality for species
- †Bryceomys
- †Cadoceras
- Callista
- †Calycoceras
- †Camarasaurus – type locality for genus
  - †Camarasaurus grandis – type locality for species
  - †Camarasaurus lentus – type locality for species
- Campeloma
- †Camptosaurus
  - †Camptosaurus dispar – type locality for species
- † Canna
- †Cedrobaena
- †Celastrus – tentative report
- †Ceramornis – type locality for genus
  - †Ceramornis major – type locality for species
- †Ceratodus
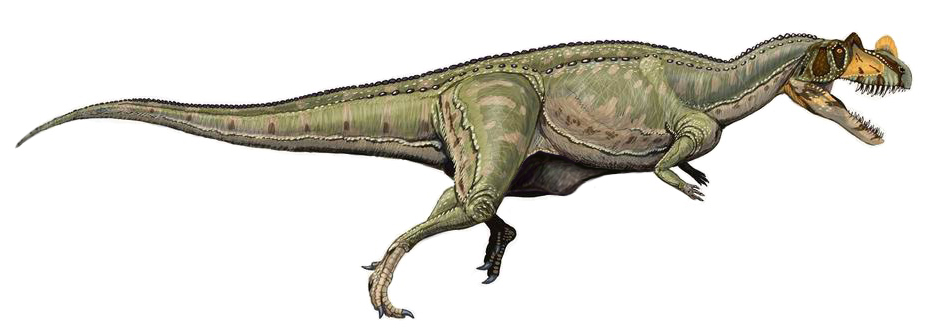
- Restoration of the Late Jurassic ceratosaur Ceratosaurus
  †Ceratosaurus
- Cercidiphyllum
- Cerithium – tentative report
- †Chamops – type locality for genus
- †Champsosaurus
- †Chelonipus – or unidentified comparable form
- Chiloscyllium
- †Chirotherium
  - †Chirotherium barthii
- Chlamys
- †Chondroceras
- †Cimexomys
  - †Cimexomys minor
- †Cimolestes
  - †Cimolestes incisus – type locality for species
  - †Cimolestes stirtoni – type locality for species
- †Cimolodon
  - †Cimolodon nitidus – type locality for species
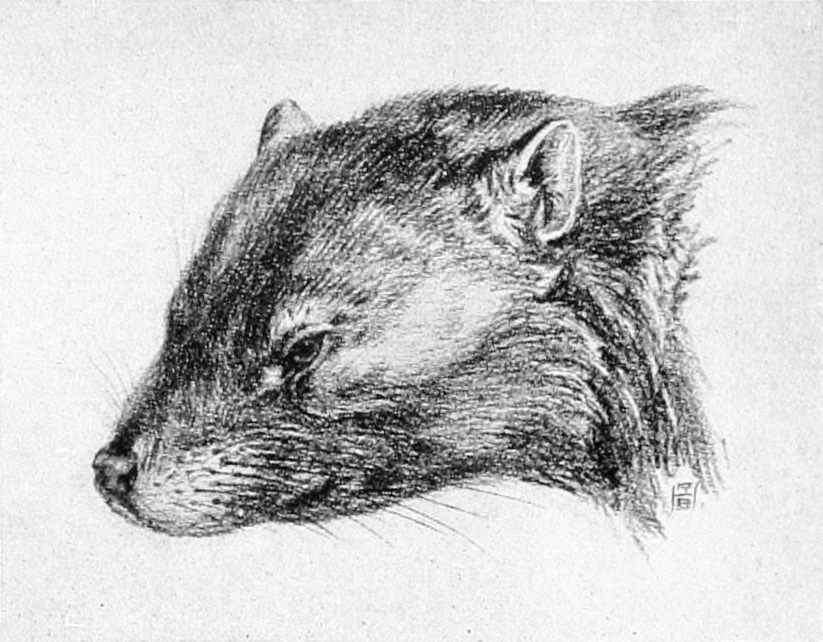
- Life restoration of the face of the Late Cretaceous multituberculate mammal Cimolomys
  †Cimolomys
  - †Cimolomys clarki
  - †Cimolomys gracilis – type locality for species
  - †Cimolomys parvus – type locality for species
- †Cimolopteryx
  - †Cimolopteryx maxima – type locality for species
  - †Cimolopteryx rara
- Cinnamomum
- Cissus
- Cladophlebis
  - †Cladophlebis parva
  - †Cladophlebis readi – type locality for species
  - †Cladophlebis wyomingensis – type locality for species
- †Claraia
  - †Claraia clarai
  - †Claraia mulleri
  - †Claraia stachei
- †Clemensodon – type locality for genus
  - †Clemensodon megaloba – type locality for species
- †Coelosuchus – type locality for genus
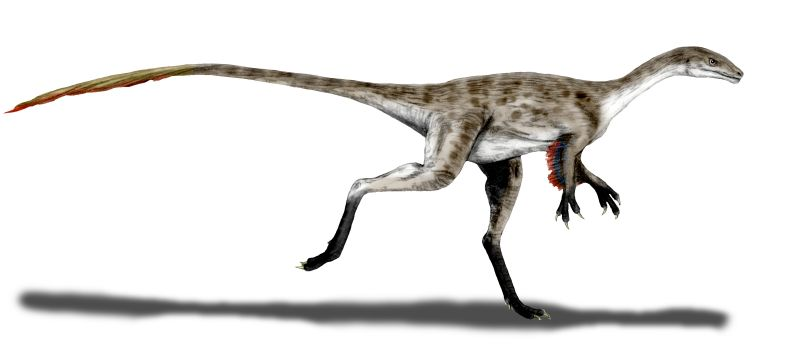
- Life restoration of the Late Jurassic primmitive tyrannosaur Coelurus
  †Coelurus – type locality for genus
  - †Coelurus fragilis – type locality for species
- †Collignoniceras
  - †Collignoniceras woollgari
- †Comobatrachus – type locality for genus
- †Comodactylus – type locality for genus
  - †Comodactylus ostromi – type locality for species
- †Comodon – type locality for genus
  - †Comodon gidleyi – type locality for species
- †Comonecturoides – type locality for genus
- †Comotherium – type locality for genus
- †Compsemys
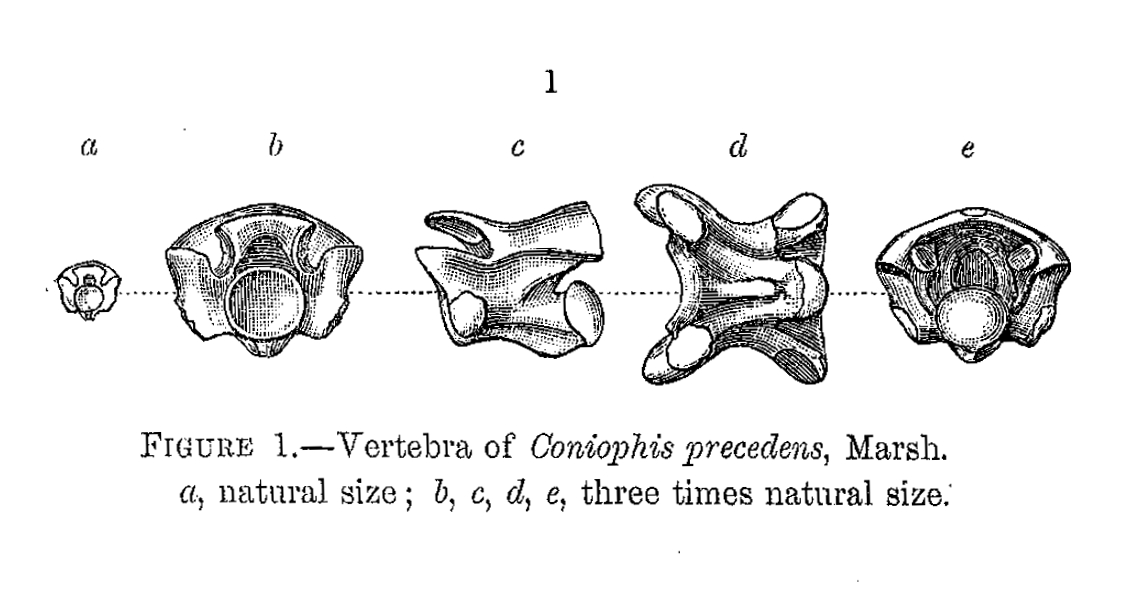
- Illustration of fossilized vertebrae of the Late Cretaceous-Eocene snake Coniophis. Othniel Charles Marsh (1892).
  †Coniophis – type locality for genus
- †Corax
- Corbula
- †Coriops
- †Corosaurus
  - †Corosaurus alcovensis
- Crenella
- †Cretorectolobus
  - †Cretorectolobus olsoni
- †Ctenacodon – type locality for genus
  - †Ctenacodon laticeps – type locality for species
  - †Ctenacodon scindens – type locality for species
  - †Ctenacodon serratus – type locality for species
- †Cteniogenys – type locality for genus
- Cucullaea
- †Cunningtoniceras
- Cuspidaria
- †Dakotasaurus – type locality for genus
- †Daspletosaurus
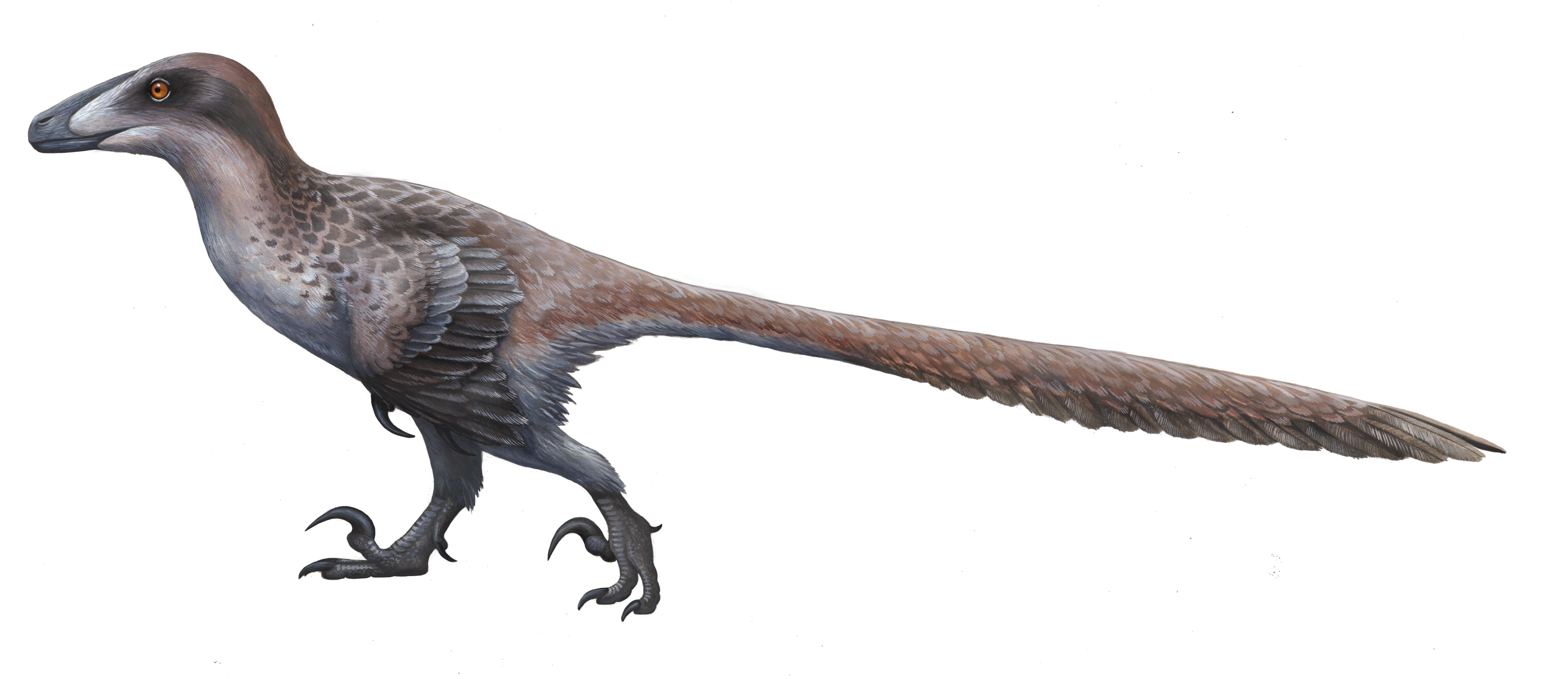
- Life restoration of the Early Cretaceous dromaeosaur ("raptor") Deinonychus
  †Deinonychus
  - †Deinonychus antirrhopus
- †Deltatheroides – or unidentified comparable form
- †Dennstaedtia
- Dentalium
  - †Dentalium pauperculum
- †Derrisemys
- †Desmatosuchus
- †Dicotyledon
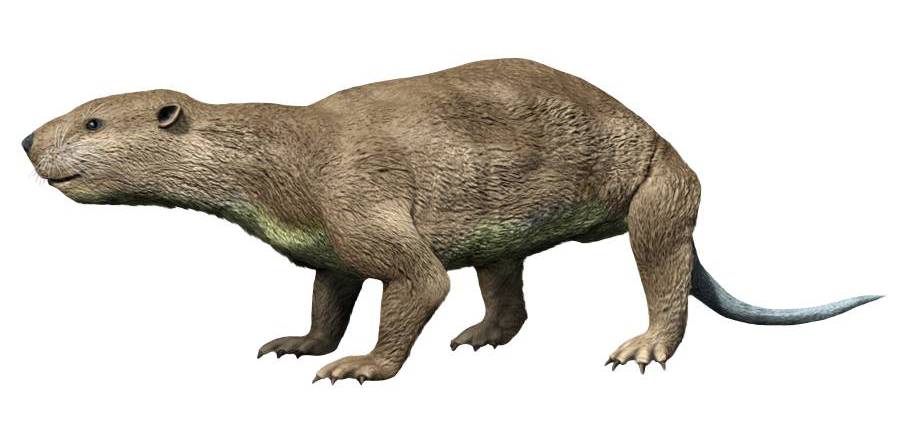
- Restoration of the Late Cretaceous marsupial relative Didelphodon
  †Didelphodon
- †Didymoceras
  - †Didymoceras nebrascense
  - †Didymoceras stevensoni
- †Dinochelys
- †Diospyros
- †Diplocraterion
- †Diplodocinae
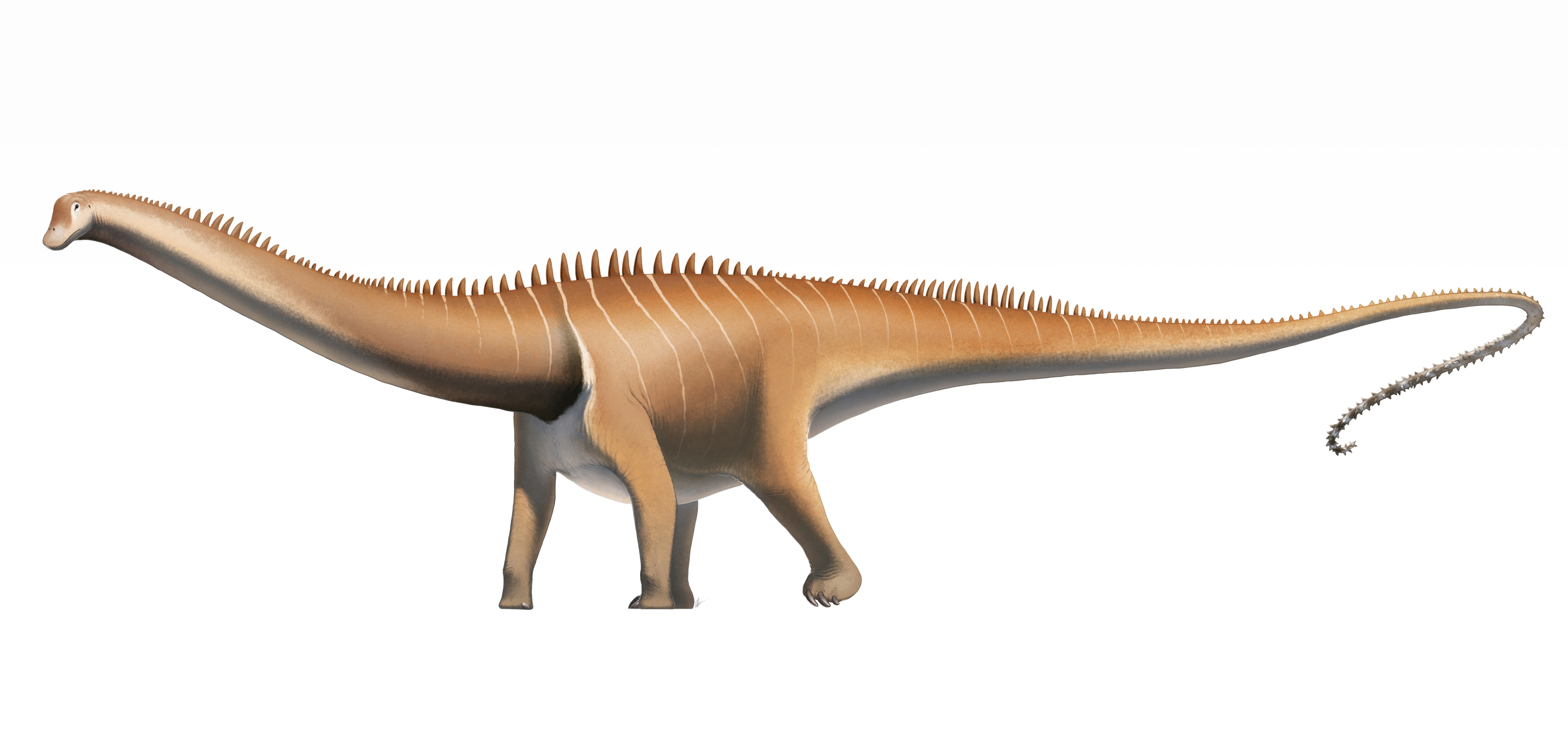
- Life restoration of the Late Jurassic long-necked dinosaur Diplodocus
  †Diplodocus
  - †Diplodocus carnegii – type locality for species
  - †Diplodocus hallorum
  - †Diplodocus longus
- †Discoscaphites
- †Docodon – type locality for genus
  - †Docodon affinis – type locality for species
  - †Docodon crassus – type locality for species
  - †Docodon striatus – type locality for species
  - †Docodon superus – type locality for species
  - †Docodon victor – type locality for species
- †Dolichobrachium – type locality for genus
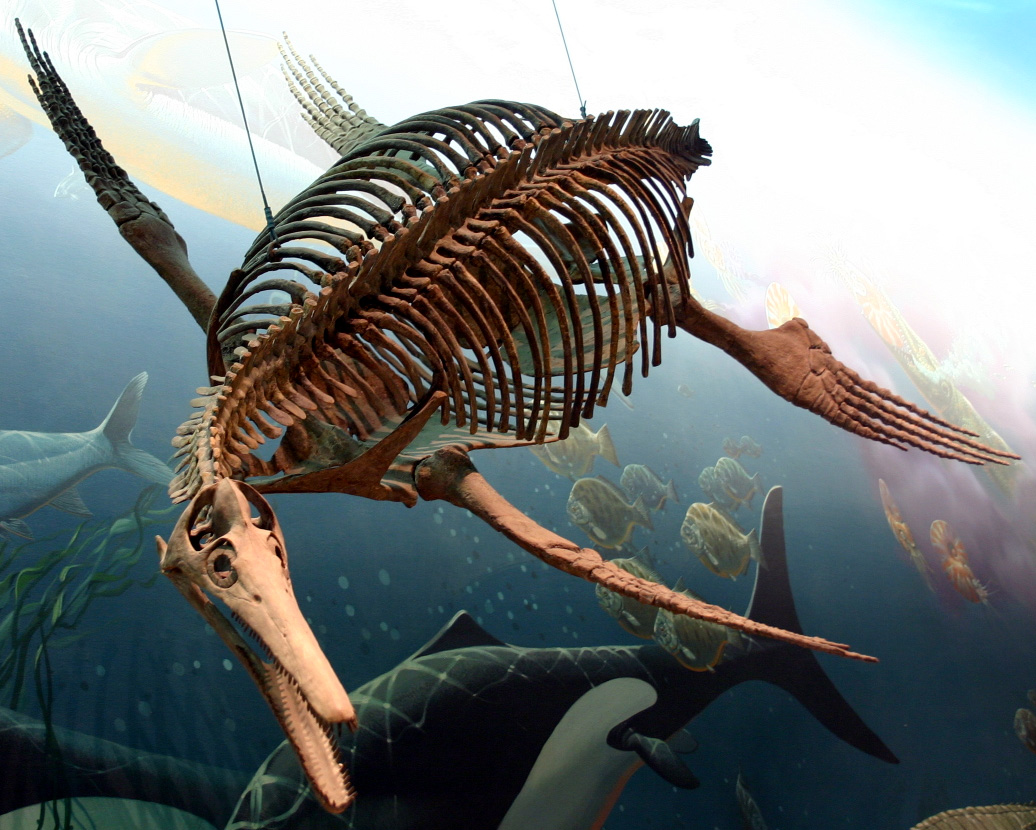
- Mounted fossilized skeleton of the Late Cretaceous plesiosaur Dolichorhynchops
  †Dolichorhynchops
  - †Dolichorhynchops osborni
- †Doratodon – tentative report
- †Dorsetisaurus
- †Drinker – type locality for genus
  - †Drinker nisti – type locality for species
- †Dromaeosaurus
- †Dryolestes – type locality for genus
- Dryopteris
- †Dryosaurus
  - †Dryosaurus altus – type locality for species
- †Dryptosaurus – or unidentified comparable form
- †Dyslocosaurus – type locality for genus
  - †Dyslocosaurus polyonychius – type locality for species
- †Echidnocephalus – tentative report
- †Edmontonia
  - †Edmontonia rugosidens – or unidentified comparable form
- †Edmontosaurus
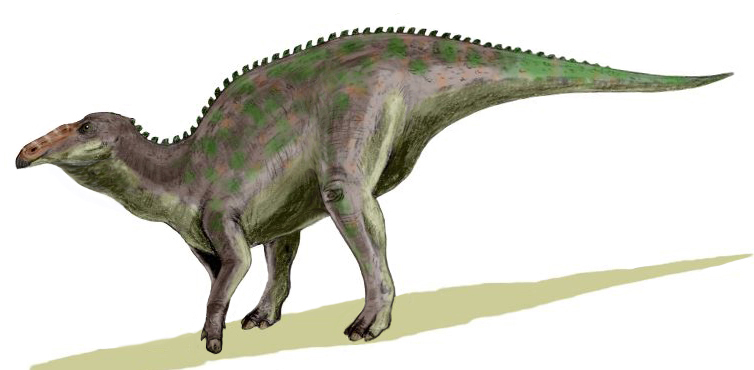
  - Life restoration of the Late Cretaceous duck-billed dinosaur Edmontosaurus annectens
    †Edmontosaurus annectens – type locality for species
- †Elaphrosaurus – tentative report
- †Elasmosaurus
- †Emarginachelys
- †Empo
- †Enneabatrachus – type locality for genus
  - †Enneabatrachus hechti – type locality for species
- †Eobatrachus – type locality for genus
- †Eocephalites
- †Eopelobates
- †Equisetum
- †Essonodon
  - †Essonodon browni
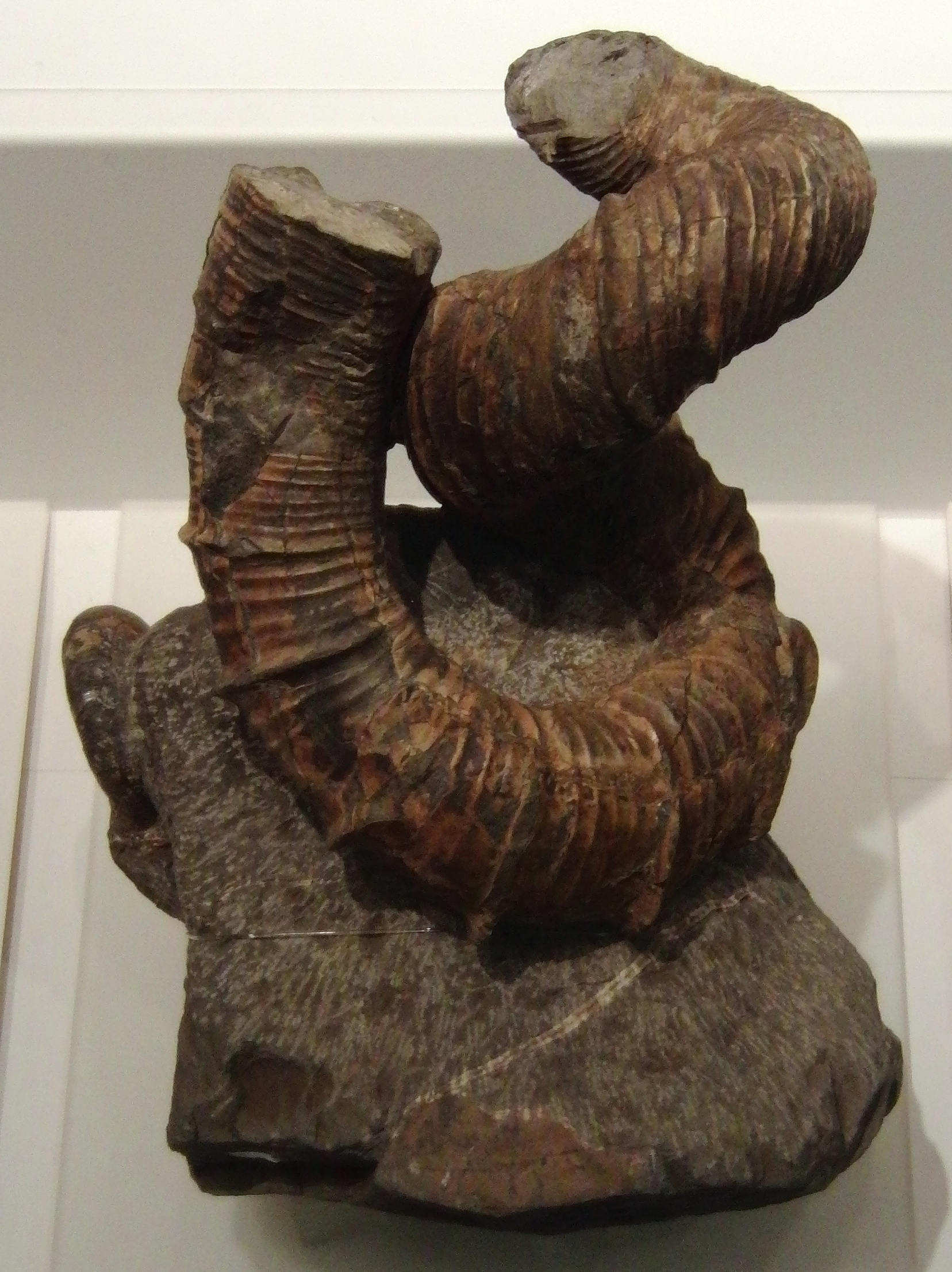
- Fossilized shell of the Late Cretaceous ammonoid cephalopod Eubostrychoceras
  †Eubostrychoceras
- †Eubrachiosaurus – type locality for genus
  - †Eubrachiosaurus browni – type locality for species
- †Eucalycoceras
- †Eucrossorhinus
- †Euomphaloceras
- †Euspira
- †Euthlastus – type locality for genus
- †Eutrephoceras
- †Eutretauranosuchus
  - †Eutretauranosuchus delfsi
- †Exiteloceras
- †Exogyra
  - †Exogyra costata
- Fasciolaria
- Ficus
- †Forresteria
- †Fosterovenator – type locality for genus
- †Foxraptor – type locality for genus
- †Fraxinus
- †Galeamopus
  - †Galeamopus hayi
  - †Galeamopus pabsti – type locality for species
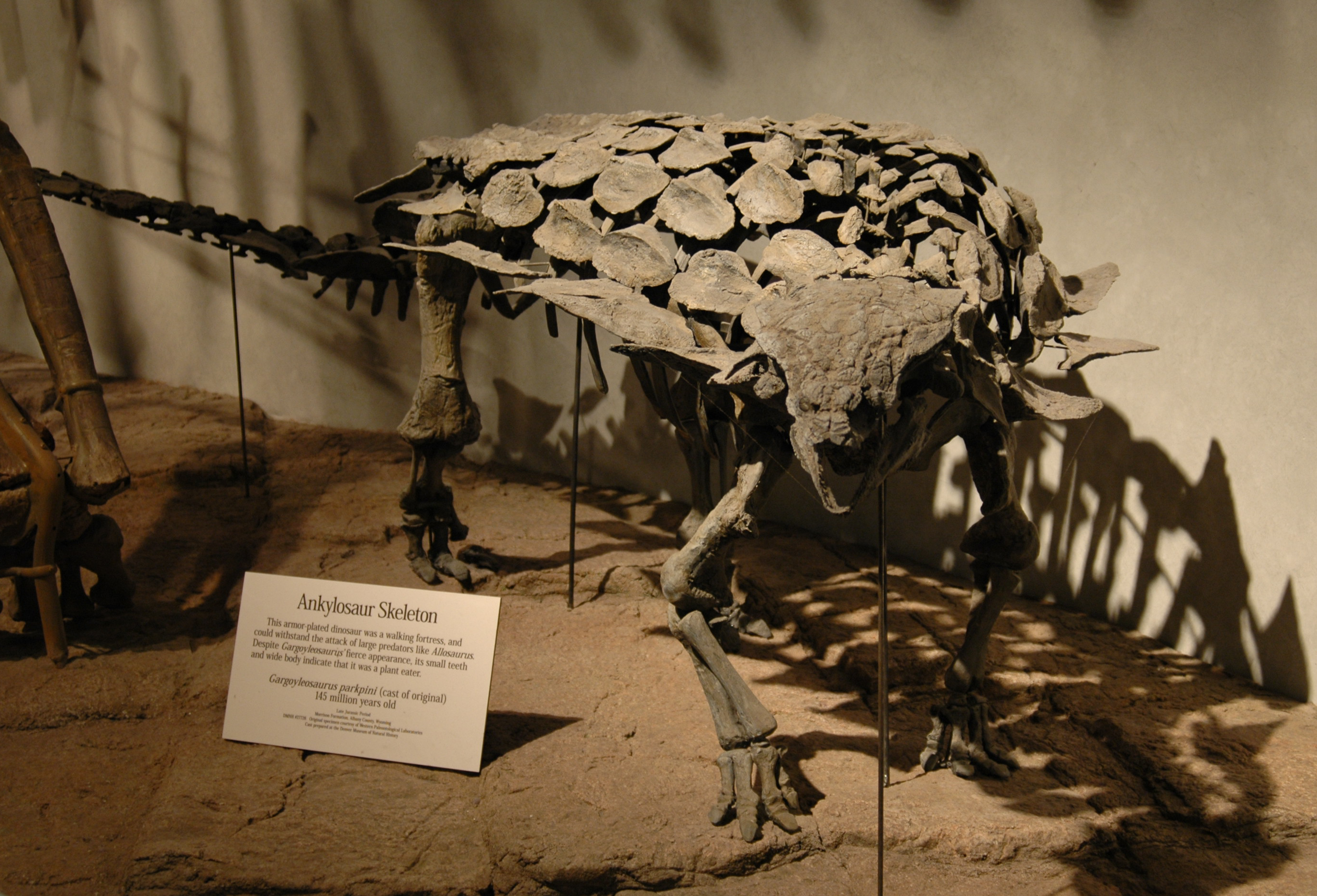
- Mounted fossilized skeleton of the Late Jurassic armored dinosaur Gargoyleosaurus
  †Gargoyleosaurus
  - †Gargoyleosaurus parkpinorum
- Gerrhonotus – or unidentified comparable form
- †Gervillaria
- †Gervillia
- †Gilmoremys
  - †Gilmoremys lancensis – type locality for species
- Ginglymostoma
- Ginkgo
  - †Ginkgo adiantoides – tentative report
- †Glyptops – type locality for genus
- Glyptostrobus
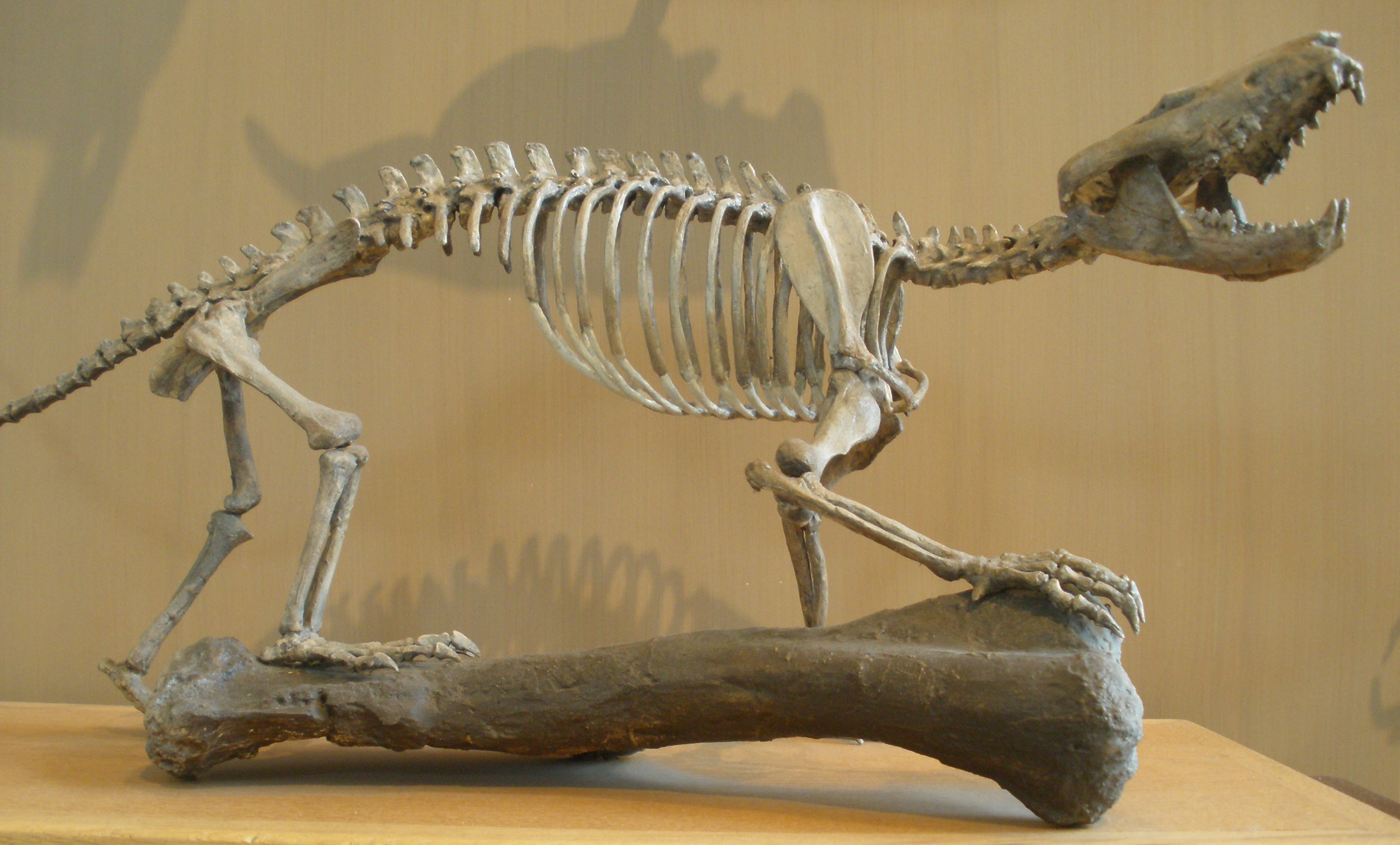
- Fossilized skeleton of the Middle Jurassic-Late Cretaceous mammal Gobiconodon
  †Gobiconodon
- †Goniopholis
- †Gryphaea
- †Habrosaurus – type locality for genus
  - †Habrosaurus dilatus – type locality for species
- †Hamites
- †Haplocanthosaurus
- †Harpactognathus – type locality for genus
  - †Harpactognathus gentryii – type locality for species
- †Heptasuchus – type locality for genus
  - †Heptasuchus clarki – type locality for species
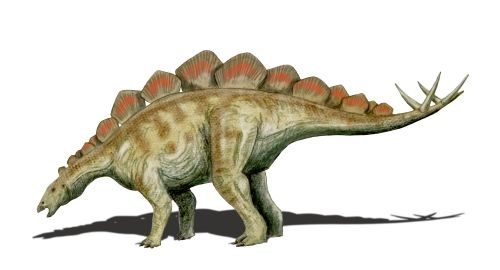
- Life restoration of the Late Jurassic stegosaur Hesperosaurus
  †Hesperosaurus – type locality for genus
  - †Hesperosaurus mjosi – type locality for species
- †Heteroceras
- †Hoploscaphites
  - †Hoploscaphites birkelundae – type locality for species
  - †Hoploscaphites gilli
  - †Hoploscaphites nodosus
  - †Hoploscaphites plenus
  - †Hoploscaphites quadrangularis
- †Hybodus
  - †Hybodus montanensis
  - †Hybodus wyomingensis – type locality for species
- †Hyperodapedon
  - †Hyperodapedon sanjuanensis – or unidentified comparable form
- †Ichthyodectes
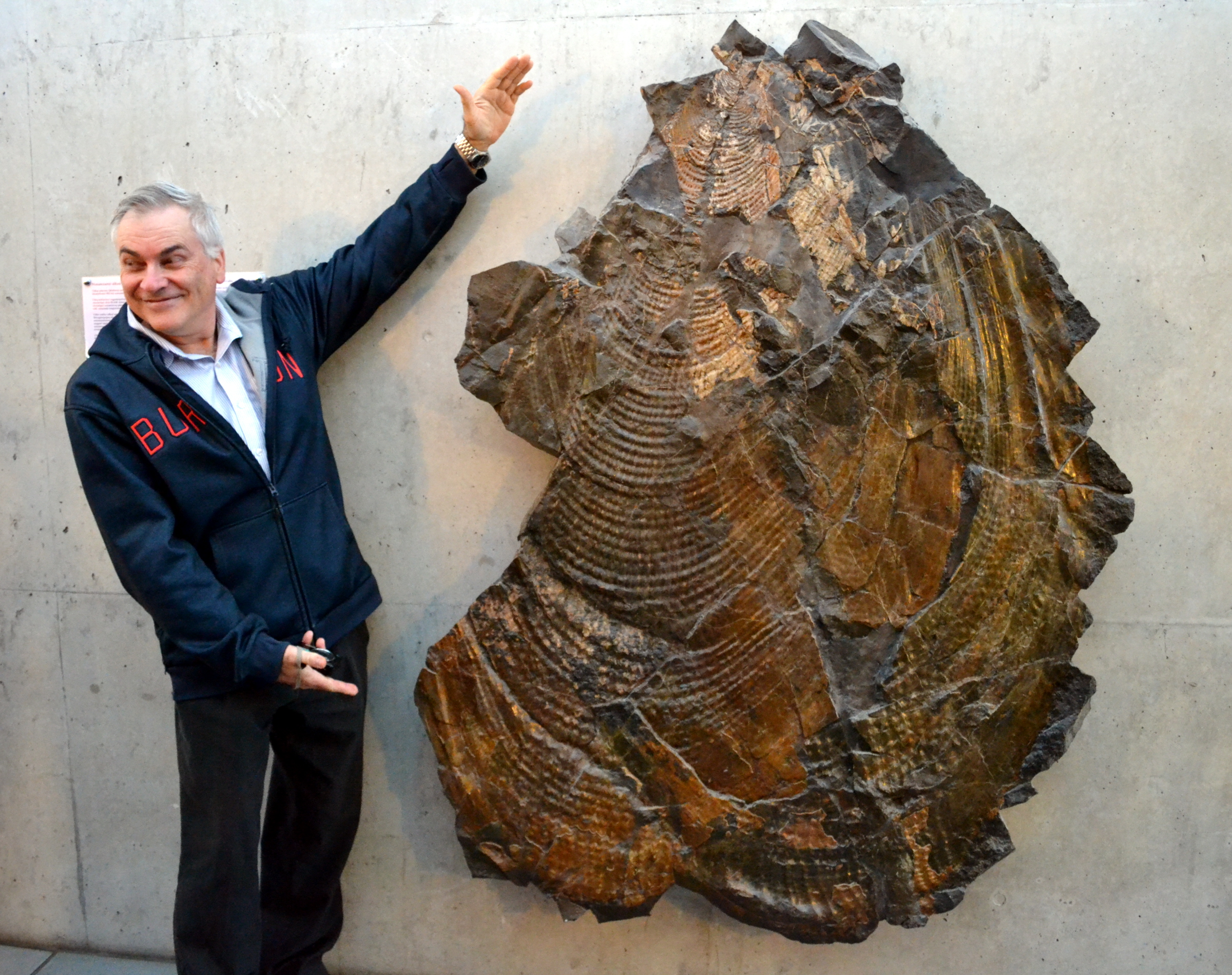
- Fossilized shell of the Early Jurassic-Late Cretaceous marine bivalve Inoceramus with a human indicating its size
  †Inoceramus
  - †Inoceramus agdjakendensis – or unidentified comparable form
  - †Inoceramus americanus – type locality for species
  - †Inoceramus anglicus
  - †Inoceramus balchii
  - †Inoceramus barabini
  - †Inoceramus crispii
  - †Inoceramus deformis
  - †Inoceramus dimidius
  - †Inoceramus erectus – or unidentified related form
  - †Inoceramus fibrosus
  - †Inoceramus fragilis – or unidentified related form
  - †Inoceramus gibbosus
  - †Inoceramus glacierensis
  - †Inoceramus grandis
  - †Inoceramus incurvus
  - †Inoceramus lundbreckensis
  - †Inoceramus perplexus
  - †Inoceramus prefragilis
  - †Inoceramus proximus – or unidentified related form
  - †Inoceramus sagensis
  - †Inoceramus subcircularis
  - †Inoceramus subcompressus
  - †Inoceramus sublaevis
  - †Inoceramus tenuirostratus
  - †Inoceramus tenuiumbonatus – or unidentified comparable form
  - †Inoceramus turgidus – or unidentified related form
  - †Inoceramus typicus
  - †Inoceramus umbonatus
  - †Inoceramus undabundus
- †Ischyrhiza
  - †Ischyrhiza avonicola – type locality for species
  - †Ischyrhiza basinensis – type locality for species
  - †Ischyrhiza mira
- Isognomon
- Isurus – tentative report
- †Janumys
- †Jeletzkytes
  - †Jeletzkytes dorfi – type locality for species
- †Kaatedocus – type locality for genus
  - †Kaatedocus siberi – type locality for species
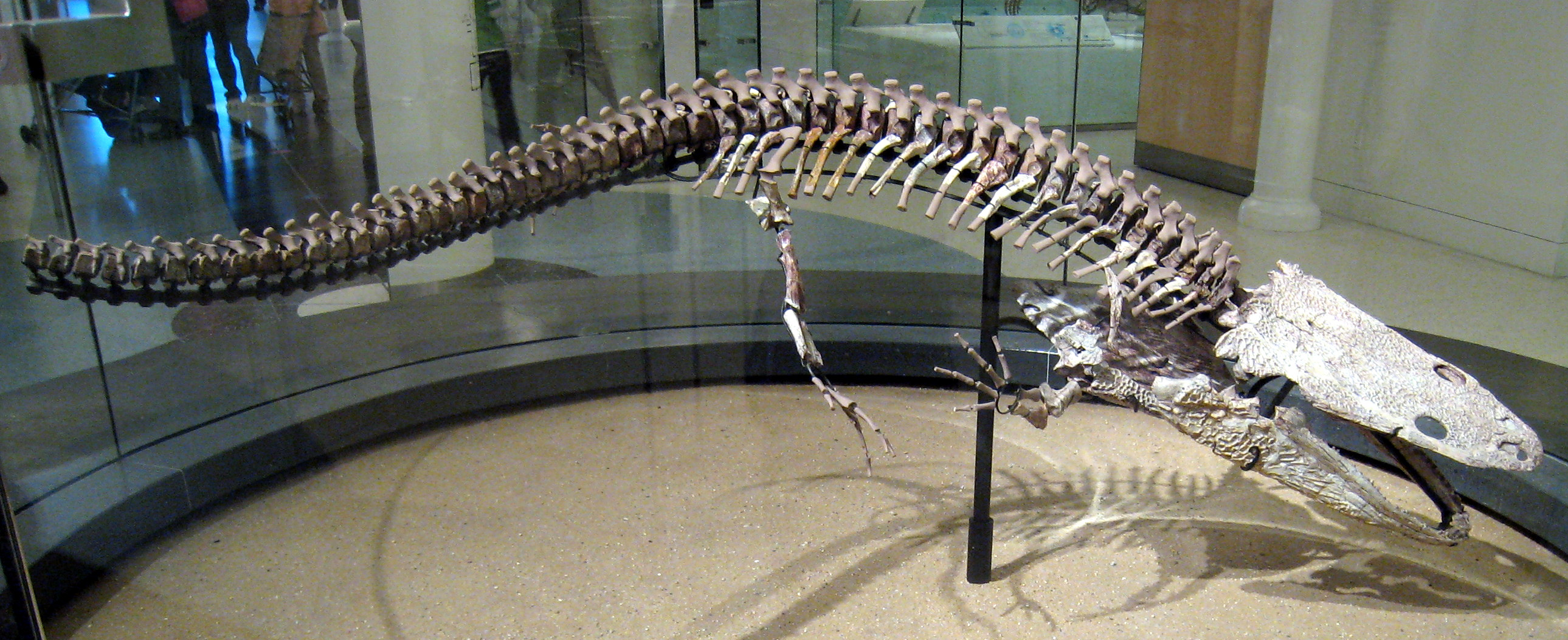
- Fossilized skeleton of the Late Triassic amphibian Koskinonodon
  †Koskinonodon – type locality for genus
- †Laolestes – type locality for genus
  - †Laolestes eminens – type locality for species
  - †Laolestes goodrichi – type locality for species
  - †Laolestes oweni – type locality for species
- †Laopteryx – type locality for genus
- †Laosaurus – type locality for genus
  - †Laosaurus celer – type locality for species
- Laurus
- †Lepidotes – or unidentified related form
- Lepisosteus
- †Leptalestes
  - †Leptalestes cooki – type locality for species
  - †Leptalestes krejcii
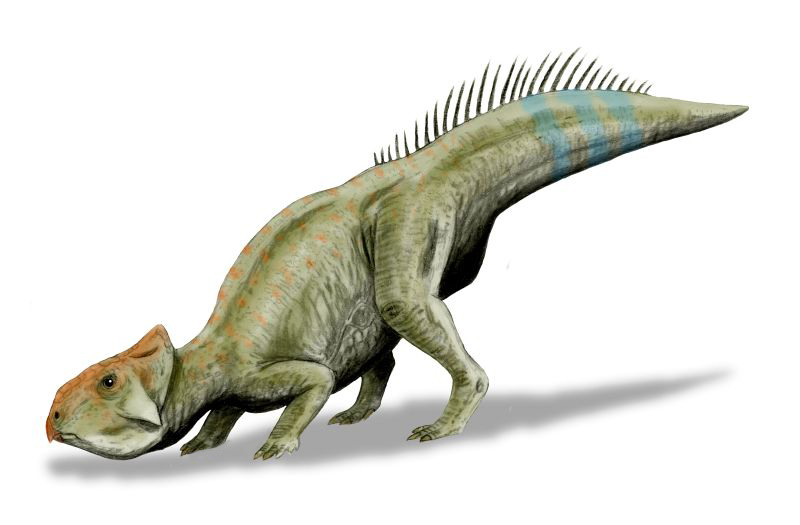
- Life restoration of the Late Cretaceous primitive horned dinosaur Leptoceratops
  †Leptoceratops
  - †Leptoceratops gracilis
- Lima
- Lingula
- Liquidambar
- †Lisserpeton
  - †Lisserpeton bairdi
- †Lissodus
- †Lonchidion – type locality for genus
- †Lonchodytes – type locality for genus
  - †Lonchodytes estesi – type locality for species
- Lucina
- Lunatia – tentative report
- Lygodium
- †Macelognathus – type locality for genus
- Mactra
- †Martinectes
  - †Martinectes bonneri – type locality for species
- †Mecochirus
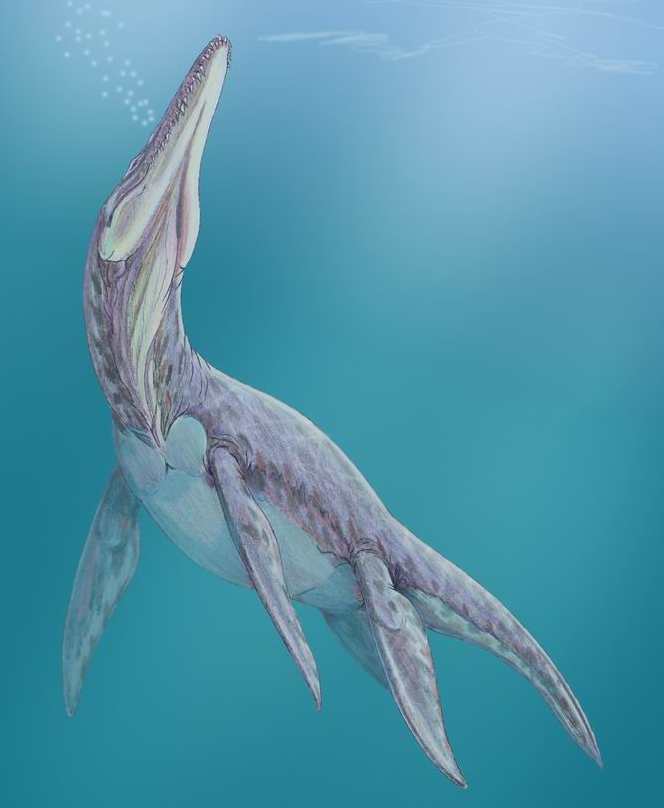
- Life restoration of the Late Jurassic plesiosaur Megalneusaurus
  †Megalneusaurus
  - †Megalneusaurus rex – type locality for species
- †Megasphaeroceras
- †Melvius
- †Meniscoessus
  - †Meniscoessus intermedius
  - †Meniscoessus robustus – type locality for species
  - †Meniscoessus seminoensis – type locality for species
- †Menuites
- †Mesodma
  - †Mesodma formosa
  - †Mesodma hensleighi
  - †Mesodma primaeva
  - †Mesodma thompsoni – type locality for species
- †Metoicoceras
  - †Metoicoceras geslinianum
  - †Metoicoceras mosbyense – or unidentified comparable form
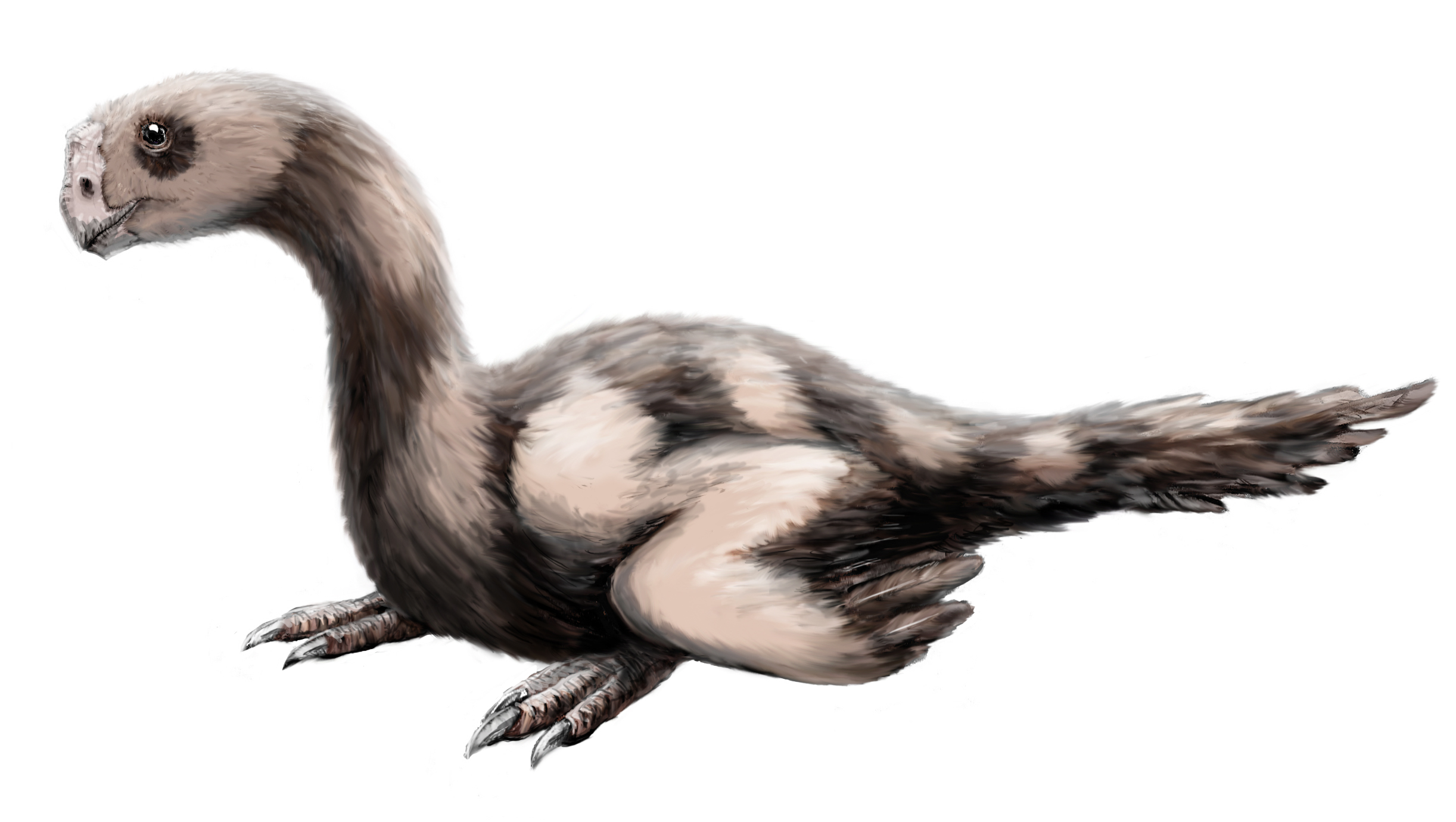
- Life restoration of the Early Cretaceous oviraptorosaur Microvenator
  †Microvenator
  - †Microvenator celer
- Modiolus
- †Morosaurus
- †Myledaphus
  - †Myledaphus bipartitus
- †Myophorella
  - †Myophorella yellowstonensis
- Myrica
- †Mytilus
- †Nanocuris
- †Nanosaurus
  - †Nanosaurus rex
- †Nanotyrannus – tentative report
- †Naomichelys
- †Nelumbo
- †Neocardioceras
  - †Neocardioceras laevigatum – type locality for species
  - †Neocardioceras minutum – type locality for species
  - †Neocardioceras transiens
  - †Neocardioceras uptonense – type locality for species
- †Neoplagiaulax
- †Nerinea – tentative report
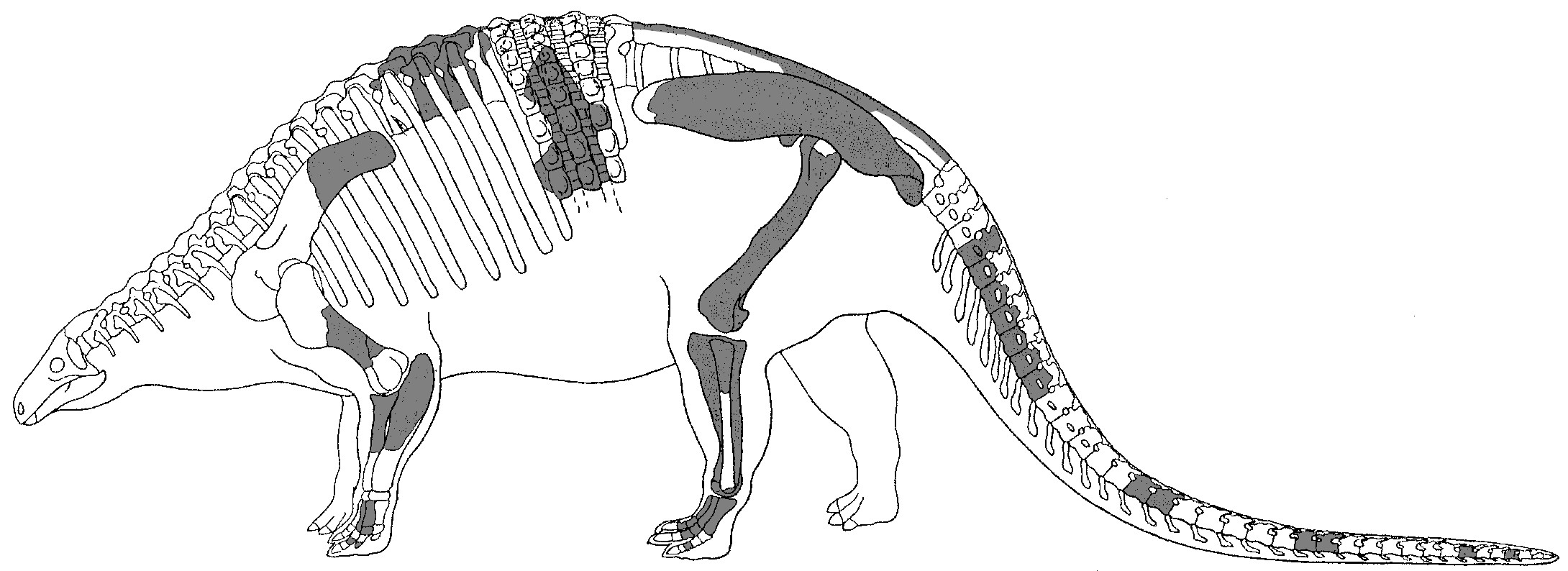
- Historical reconstruction of the holotype skeleton from 1921
  †Nodosaurus – type locality for genus
  - †Nodosaurus textilis – type locality for species
- †Normannites – tentative report
- Nucula
- †Obamadon
  - †Obamadon gracilis
- †Odaxosaurus – type locality for genus
  - †Odaxosaurus piger – type locality for species
- Odontaspis
- †Oklatheridium
- †Onoclea
- †Ophiopsis
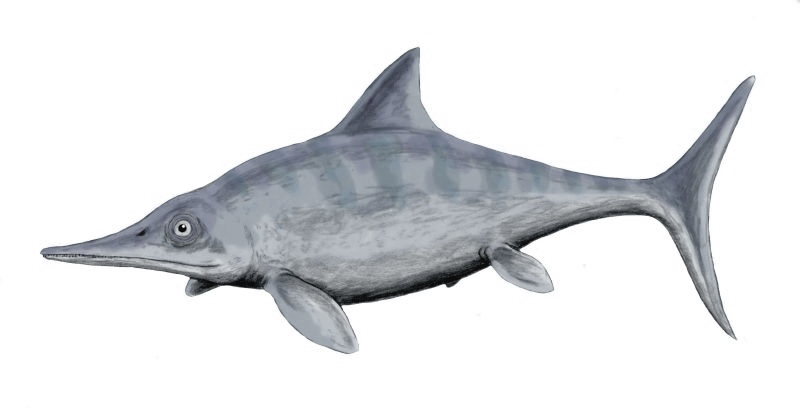
- Life restoration of the Late Jurassic ichthyosaur Ophthalmosaurus
  †Ophthalmosaurus
  - †Ophthalmosaurus natans
- †Opisthias
- †Opisthotriton
- †Ornitholestes – type locality for genus
  - †Ornitholestes hermanni – type locality for species
- †Ornithomimus
  - †Ornithomimus minutus
  - †Ornithomimus sedens – type locality for species
  - †Ornithomimus velox – or unidentified comparable form
- †Osmakasaurus – tentative report
  - †Osmakasaurus depressus
- Ostrea
- †Othnielia
- †Othnielosaurus
  - †Othnielosaurus consors – type locality for species
- †Oxytoma
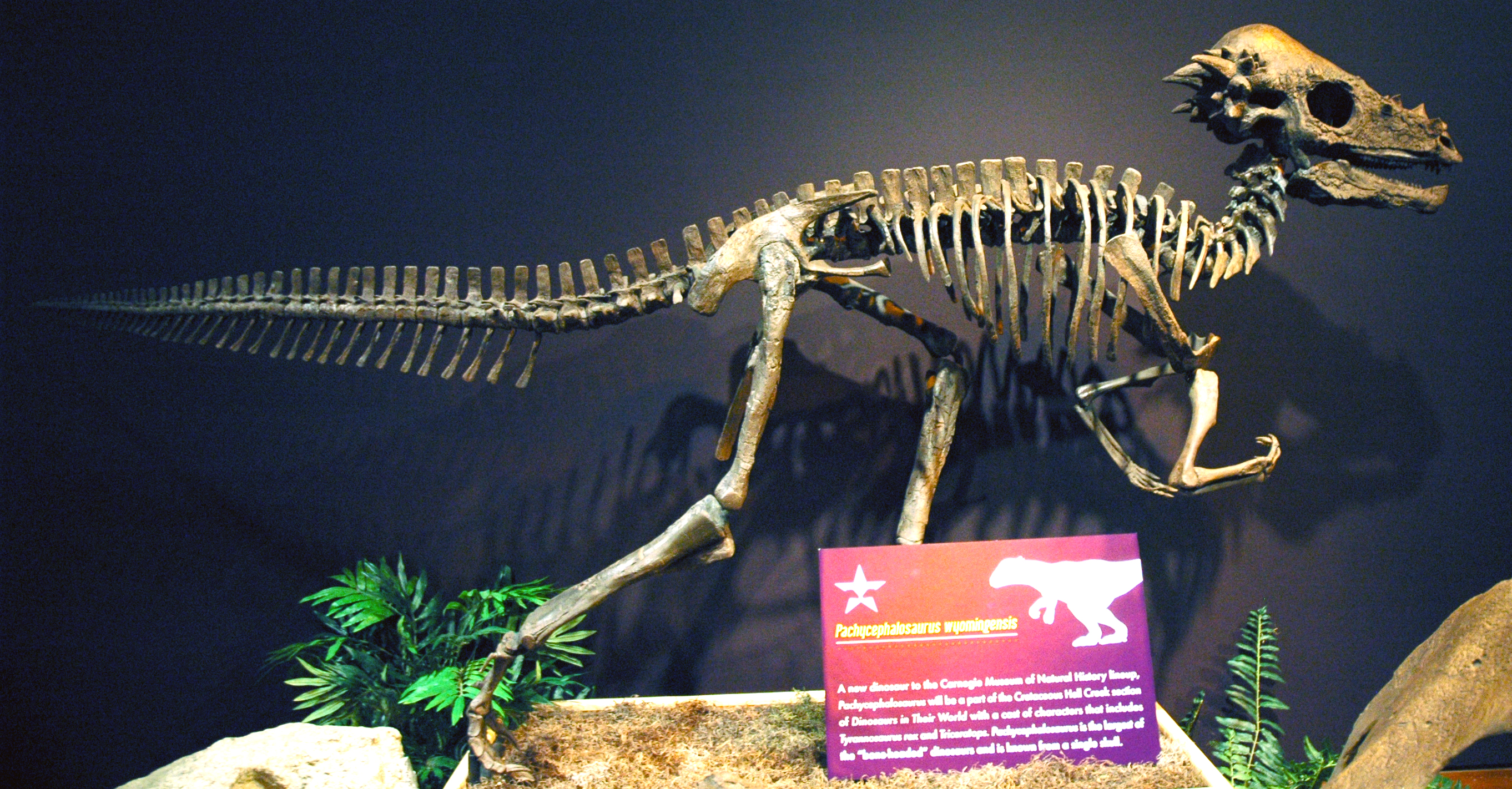
- Pachycephalosaurus
  †Pachycephalosaurus
  - †Pachycephalosaurus wyomingensis – type locality for species
- †Pachyrhizodus
- †Pachyteuthis
- †Palaeobatrachus
- †Palaeosaniwa – type locality for genus
  - †Palaeosaniwa canadensis – type locality for species
- †Paleopsephurus
  - †Paleopsephurus wilsoni
- †Paleorhinus
  - †Paleorhinus parvus – type locality for species
- †Paliurus
- †Pantosaurus – type locality for genus
  - †Pantosaurus striatus – type locality for species
- †Paracimexomys
  - †Paracimexomys priscus
- †Paradiscoglossus – type locality for genus
- †Paralbula
- †Paramacellodus
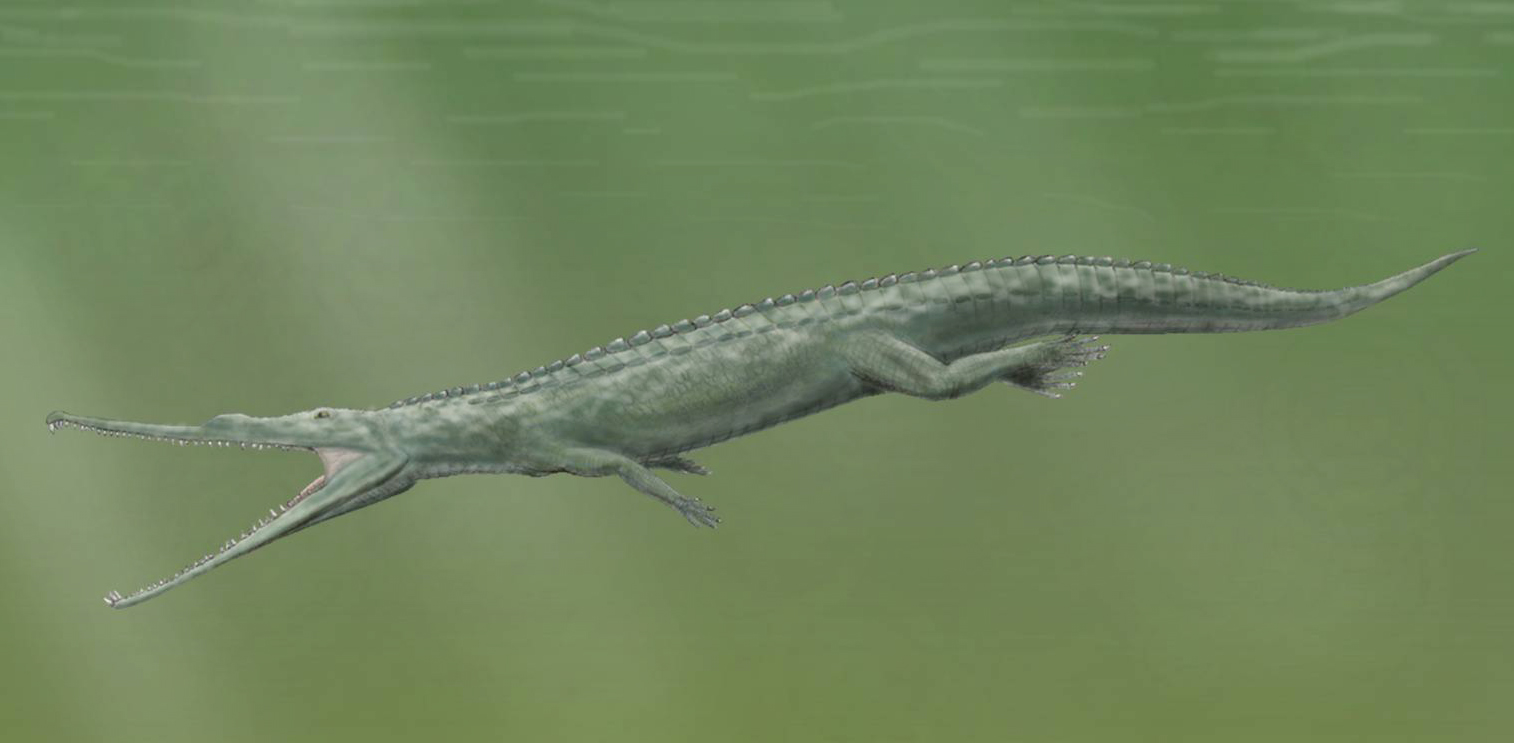
- Life restoration of the Late Triassic phytosaur Parasuchus
  †Parasuchus
- †Paressonodon
- †Pariguana – type locality for genus
- †Parikimys
- †Paronychodon
  - †Paronychodon lacustris – type locality for species
- †Paurodon – type locality for genus
- †Pecopteris
- Pecten
- †Pectinodon – type locality for genus
  - †Pectinodon bakkeri – type locality for species
- Persea – report made of unidentified related form or using admittedly obsolete nomenclature
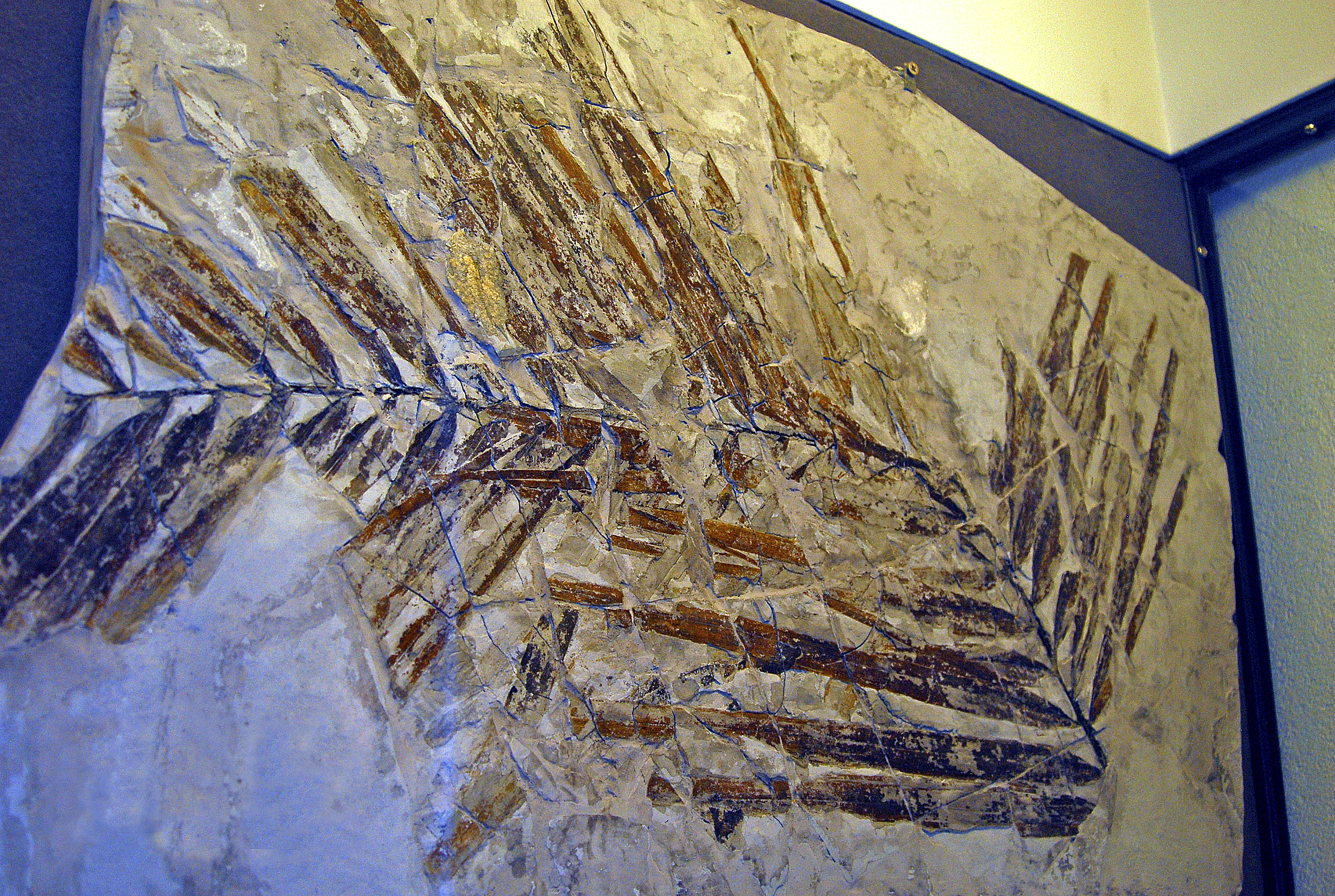
- Phoenicites
  †Phoenicites – or unidentified comparable form
- Pholadomya
  - †Pholadomya inaequiplicata
  - †Pholadomya kingi
- †Phragmites
- Phyllodus
- Physa – or unidentified comparable form
- †Piceoerpeton
- Pinna
- Pinus
- Pistacia
- †Pistia
- †Placenticeras
  - †Placenticeras intercalare
  - †Placenticeras meeki
  - †Placenticeras pseudoplacenta
- †Plagiostoma
- Planorbis
- Platanus
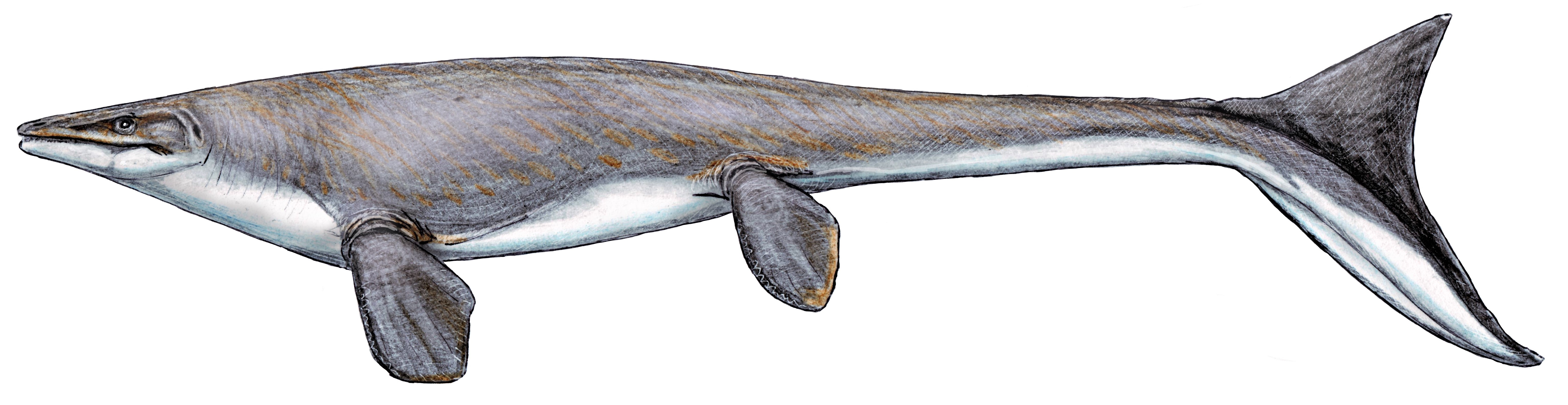
- Life restoration of the Late Cretaceous mosasaur Platecarpus
  †Platecarpus
  - †Platecarpus tympaniticus
- †Platymya
- †Platypterygius
- †Plesiobaena
- †Plesiopleurodon – type locality for genus
  - †Plesiopleurodon wellesi – type locality for species
- †Plesiosaurus
- Plicatula
- Polinices
- †Polycotylus
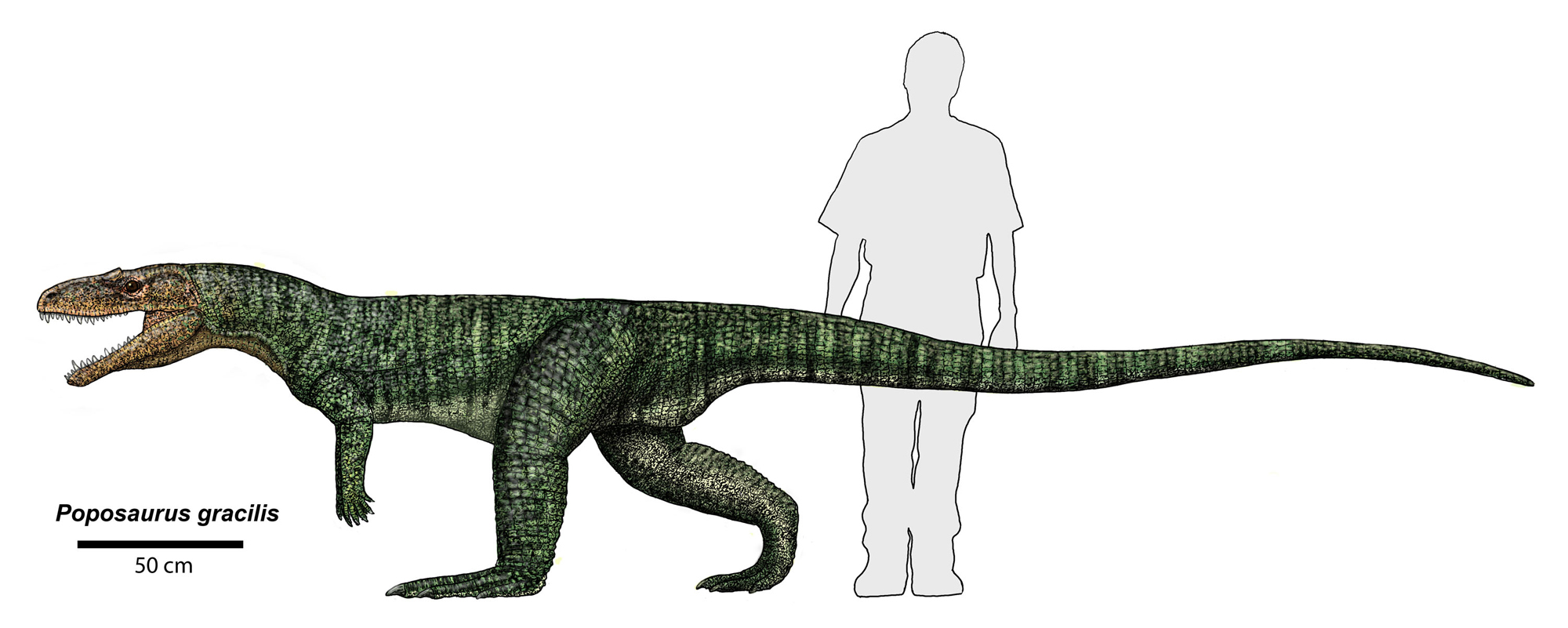
- Restoration of the Late Triassic crocodile relative Poposaurus with an anachronistic human to scale
  †Poposaurus – type locality for genus
  - †Poposaurus gracilis – type locality for species
- Populus
- †Potamoceratodus
- †Potamornis – type locality for genus
  - †Potamornis skutchi – type locality for species
- †Priacodon
  - †Priacodon ferox – type locality for species
  - †Priacodon grandaevus – type locality for species
  - †Priacodon lulli – type locality for species
  - †Priacodon robustus – type locality for species
- †Prodesmodon – type locality for genus
- †Prodiplocynodon – type locality for genus
  - †Prodiplocynodon langi – type locality for species
- †Protocardia
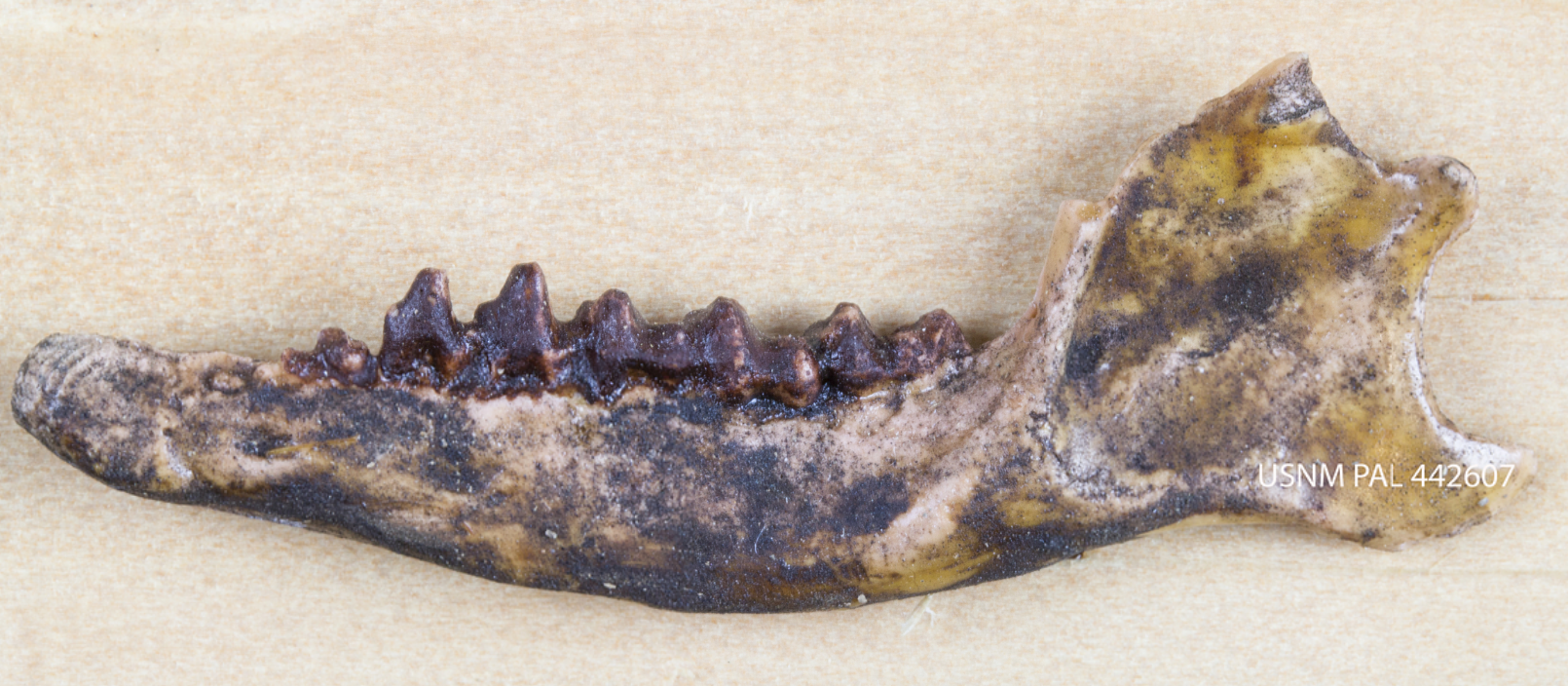
- Fossilized mandible of the Late Cretaceous-Paleocene mammal Protungulatum
  †Protungulatum – tentative report
- Prunus
- †Psalodon
  - †Psalodon fortis – type locality for species
  - †Psalodon marshi – type locality for species
  - †Psalodon potens – type locality for species
- †Pseudoperna
  - †Pseudoperna congesta
- †Pteraichnus
  - †Pteraichnus stokesi – type locality for species
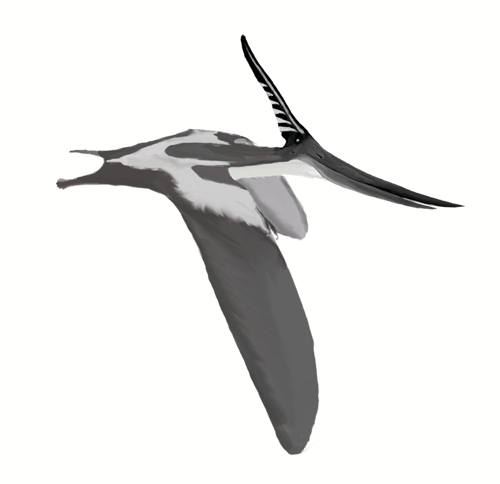
- Life restoration of the Late Cretaceous pterosaur Pteranodon
  †Pteranodon
  - †Pteranodon longiceps
- †Pteria
- †Pterodactylus
  - †Pterodactylus montanus – type locality for species
- †Ptilotodon
- †Ptychotrygon
  - †Ptychotrygon boothi – type locality for species
- Quercus
- †Rhamnus
- Rhinobatos
- †Rhizocorallium
- †Richardoestesia
  - †Richardoestesia isosceles
- Rostellaria – tentative report
- †Saccoloma – report made of unidentified related form or using admittedly obsolete nomenclature
- Salix
- †Salpichlaena
- Sassafras
- †Saurexallopus – type locality for genus
- †Saurocephalus
- †Saurolophus
- †Sauropelta
  - †Sauropelta edwardsorum
- Diagram illustrating the Early Cretaceous long-necked dinosaur Sauroposeidon with anachronistic humans to scale
  †Sauroposeidon
  - †Sauroposeidon proteles
- †Saurornithoides – or unidentified comparable form
- †Saurornitholestes
- †Sauvagesia
- †Scapanorhynchus
  - †Scapanorhynchus texanus
- †Scapherpeton
- †Scaphites
  - †Scaphites aquilaensis
  - †Scaphites binneyi
  - †Scaphites hippocrepis
  - †Scaphites stantoni
  - †Scaphites ventricosus
  - †Scaphites whitfieldi
- †Scotiophryne
- Scyliorhinus
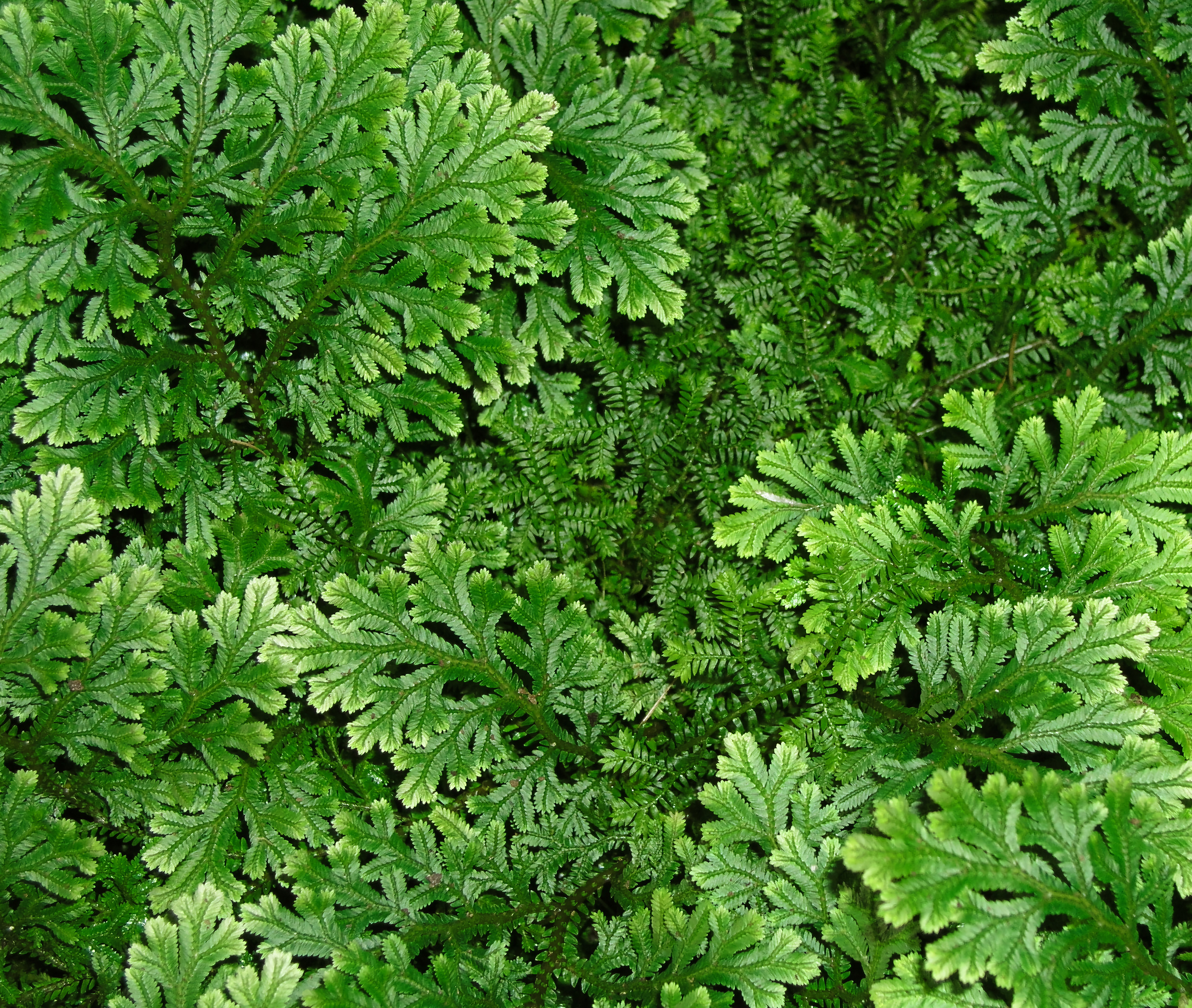
- A living Selaginella, or spikemoss
  †Selaginella
- Sequoia
- †Skolithos
- †Smilax
- †Socognathus
- Solemya
- †Sparganium
- Sphaerium – or unidentified comparable form
- †Sphenodiscus
  - †Sphenodiscus lobatus – or unidentified comparable form
  - †Sphenodiscus pleurisepta
- †Sphenopteris
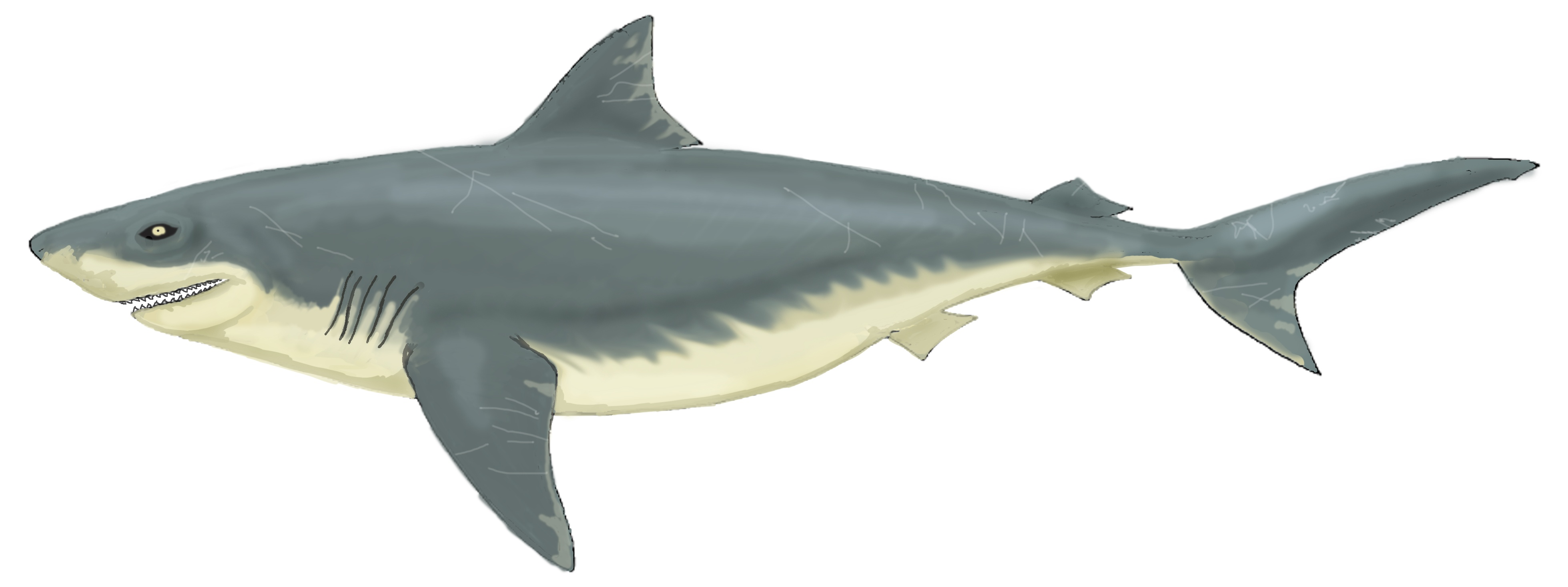
- Restoration of the Late Cretaceous shark Squalicorax
  Squalicorax
  - †Squalicorax kaupi
  - †Squalicorax pristodontus
- †Squatirhina
  - †Squatirhina americana – type locality for species
- †Staphylea
- †Stegopelta – type locality for genus
  - †Stegopelta landerensis – type locality for species
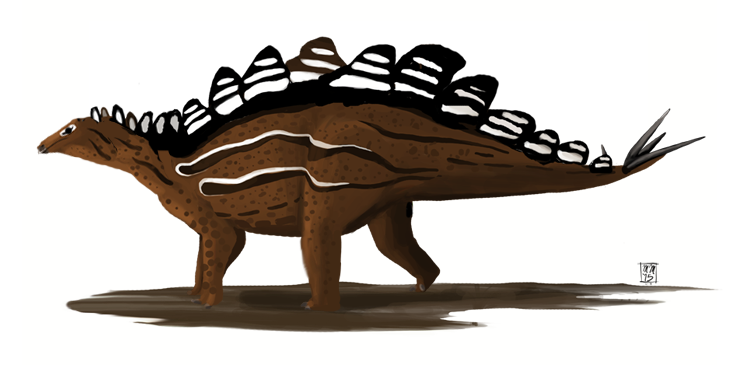
- Restoration of the Late Jurassic stegosaur Stegosaurus
  †Stegosaurus – type locality for genus
  - †Stegosaurus armatus – type locality for species
  - †Stegosaurus longispinus – type locality for species
  - †Stegosaurus stenops
  - †Stegosaurus sulcatus – type locality for species
  - †Stegosaurus ungulatus – type locality for species
- Sterculia
- †Stokesosaurus – tentative report
  - †Stokesosaurus clevelandi
- †Struthiomimus – or unidentified comparable form
- †Styxosaurus
  - †Styxosaurus browni – type locality for species
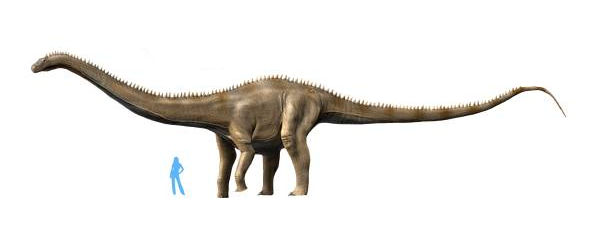
- Restoration in multiple views of the Late Jurassic sauropod dinosaur Supersaurus with an anachronistic human to scale
  †Supersaurus
  - †Supersaurus vivianae
- †Tanycolagreus – type locality for genus
  - †Tanycolagreus topwilsoni – type locality for species
- †Tatenectes
  - †Tatenectes laramiensis – type locality for species
- †Tathiodon – type locality for genus
- †Tenea
- †Tenontosaurus
  - †Tenontosaurus tilletti
- Teredo
- †Thalassinoides
- †Theatonius – type locality for genus
- †Theretairus – type locality for genus
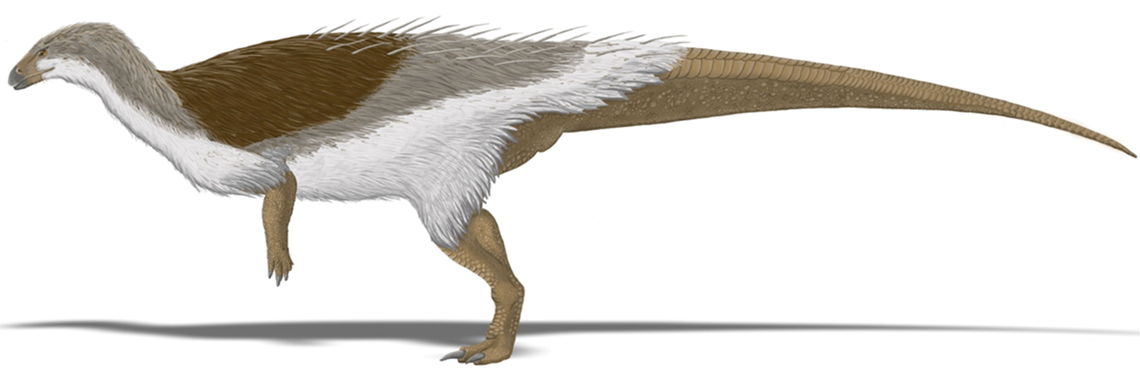
- Life restoration of the Late Cretaceous herbivorous dinosaur Thescelosaurus
  †Thescelosaurus – type locality for genus
  - †Thescelosaurus neglectus – type locality for species
- †Thoracosaurus – or unidentified comparable form
- Thracia
- Thyasira
- †Thyrsopteris
- †Tinodon – type locality for genus
- †Torosaurus – type locality for genus
  - †Torosaurus latus – type locality for species
- †Torotix – type locality for genus
  - †Torotix clemensi – type locality for species
- †Torvosaurus – type locality for genus
  - †Torvosaurus tanneri – type locality for species
- †Trachodon
- †Tragodesmoceras
  - †Tragodesmoceras carlilense
- †Trapa
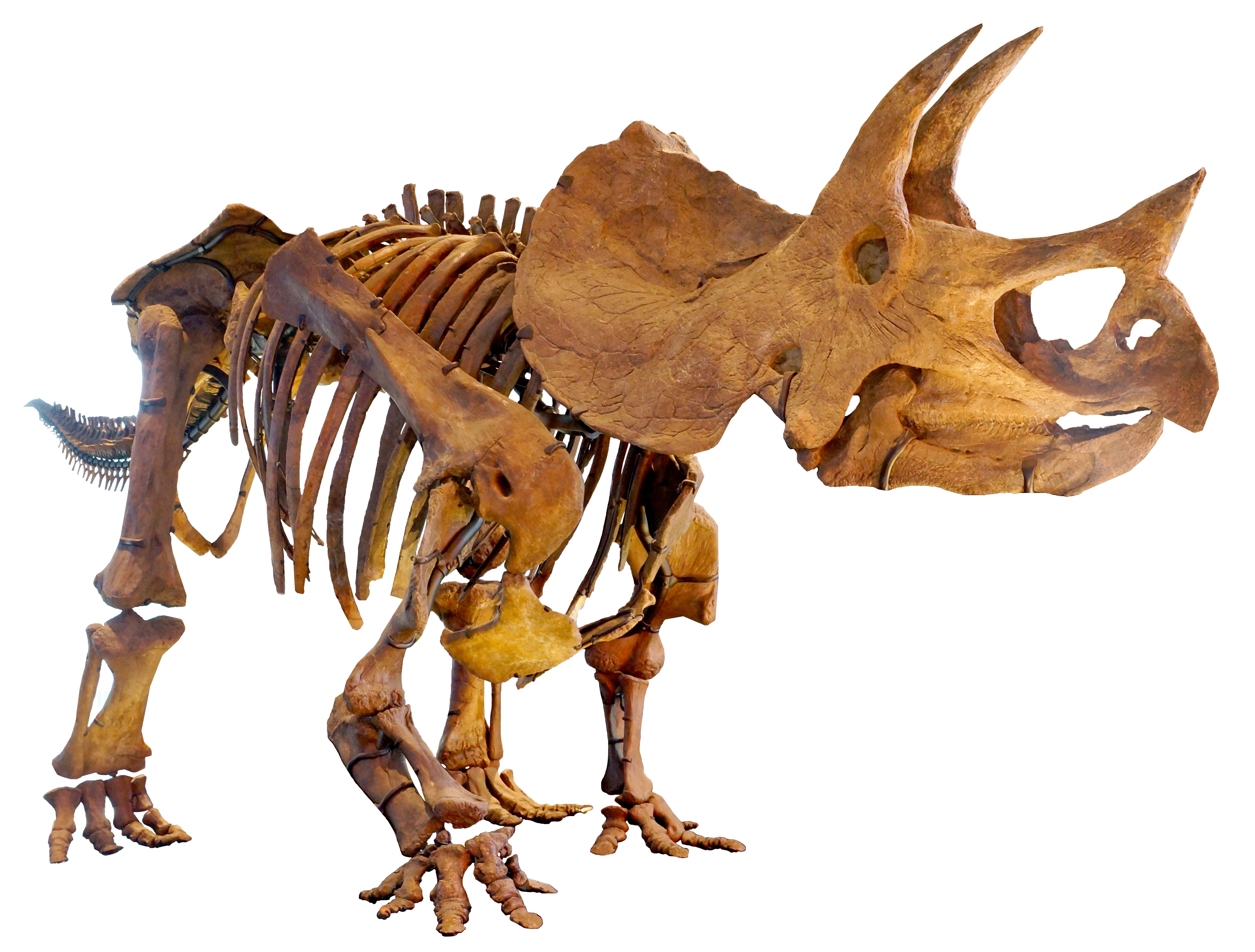
- Mounted fossilized skeleton of the Late Cretaceous horned dinosaur Triceratops
  †Triceratops – type locality for genus
  - †Triceratops horridus – type locality for species
  - †Triceratops ingens – type locality for species
  - †Triceratops prorsus – type locality for species
  - †Triceratops sulcatus – type locality for species
- †Trigonia
  - †Trigonia americana
  - †Trigonia elegantissima
  - †Trigonia montanaensis
  - †Trigonia quadrangularis
- †Trioracodon
  - †Trioracodon bisulcus – type locality for species
- †Troodon
  - †Troodon formosus
- Typha
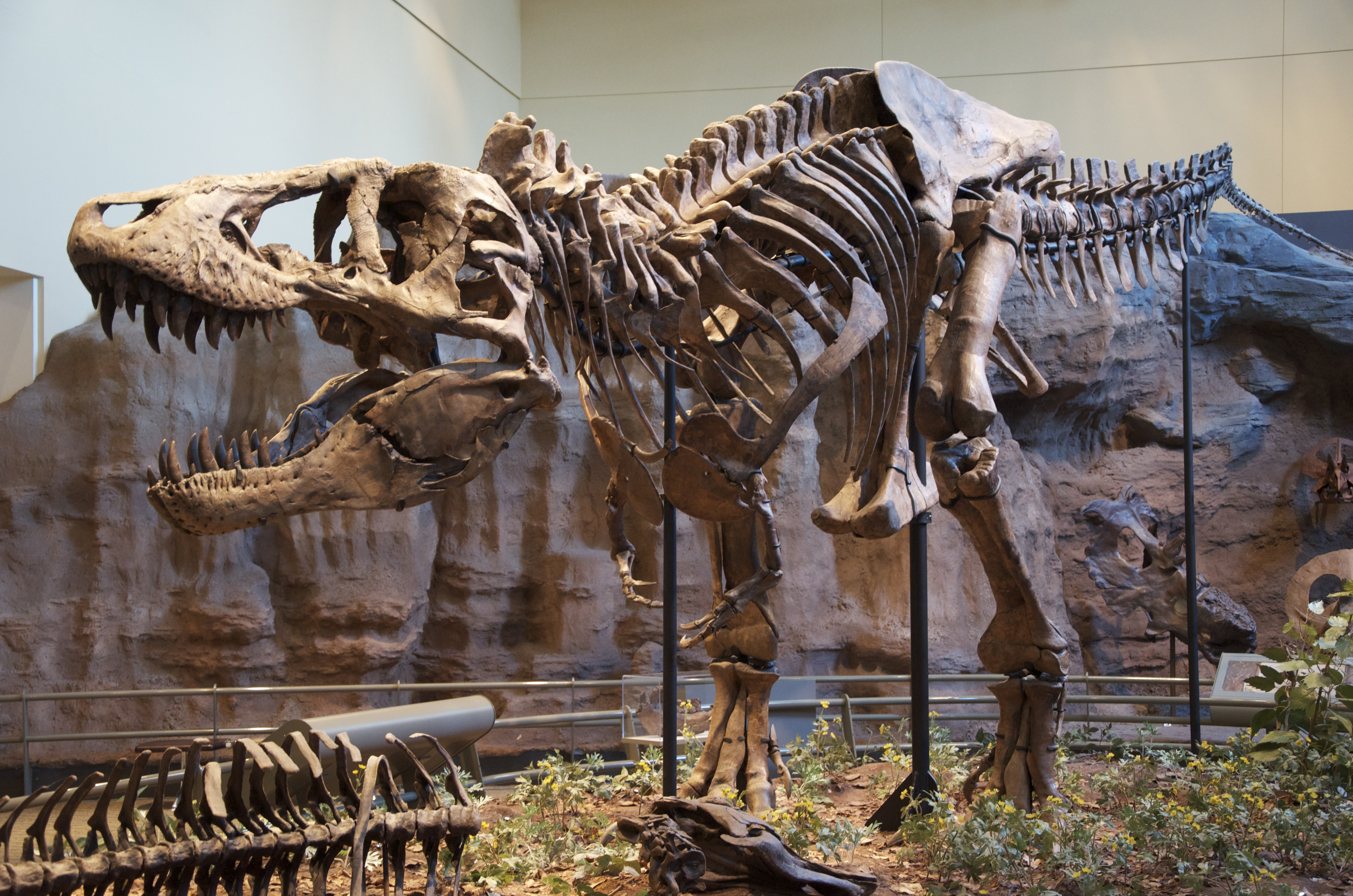
- Fossilized skeleton of the Late Cretaceous tyrannosaur Tyrannosaurus
  †Tyrannosaurus – type locality for genus
  - †Tyrannosaurus rex – type locality for species
- †Uluops – type locality for genus
  - †Uluops uluops – type locality for species
- Unio
- Vanikoro
- †Viburnum
- Vitis
- Viviparus – or unidentified comparable form
- †Weichselia
- †Williamsonia – tentative report
- †Woodwardia
- †Xenocephalites
- †Xiphactinus
- Yoldia
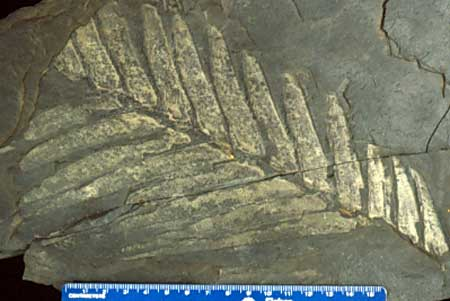
- Fossil of the Early Triassic-Eocene cycad-like frond Zamites
  †Zamites
  - †Zamites arcticus
  - †Zamites borealis
  - †Zamites brevipennis
- †Zapsalis – or unidentified comparable form
- †Zephyrosaurus – or unidentified comparable form
- †Zofiabaatar – type locality for genus
  - †Zofiabaatar pulcher – type locality for species

== Cenozoic ==
=== Selected Cenozoic taxa of Wyoming ===
- †Abuta – or unidentified related form
- †Acacia
- Accipiter
  - †Accipiter gentilis
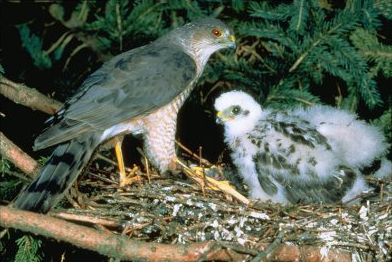
  - Living adult (center) and chick (lower right) Accipiter striatus, or sharp-shinned hawks
    †Accipiter striatus
- Acer
- †Acidomomys – type locality for genus
- †Acrostichum
- †Adilophontes – type locality for genus
- †Adocus
- Aegialia
- Aegolius
  - †Aegolius acadicus
  - †Aegolius funereus
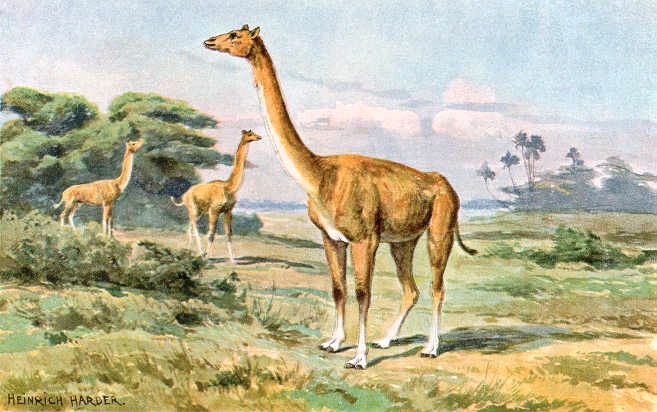
- Life restoration of the Miocene camel Aepycamelus, or the long-necked camel. Heinrich Harder (1920).
  †Aepycamelus
- †Aesculus
- †Afairiguana – type locality for genus
  - †Afairiguana avius – type locality for species
- Agelaius
  - †Agelaius phoeniceus
- †Agnotocastor
  - †Agnotocastor galushai – type locality for species
- †Agriochoerus
- †Ailanthus
- †Alastor
- Alces
  - †Alces alces
- †Alchornea – or unidentified related form
- †Aletodon
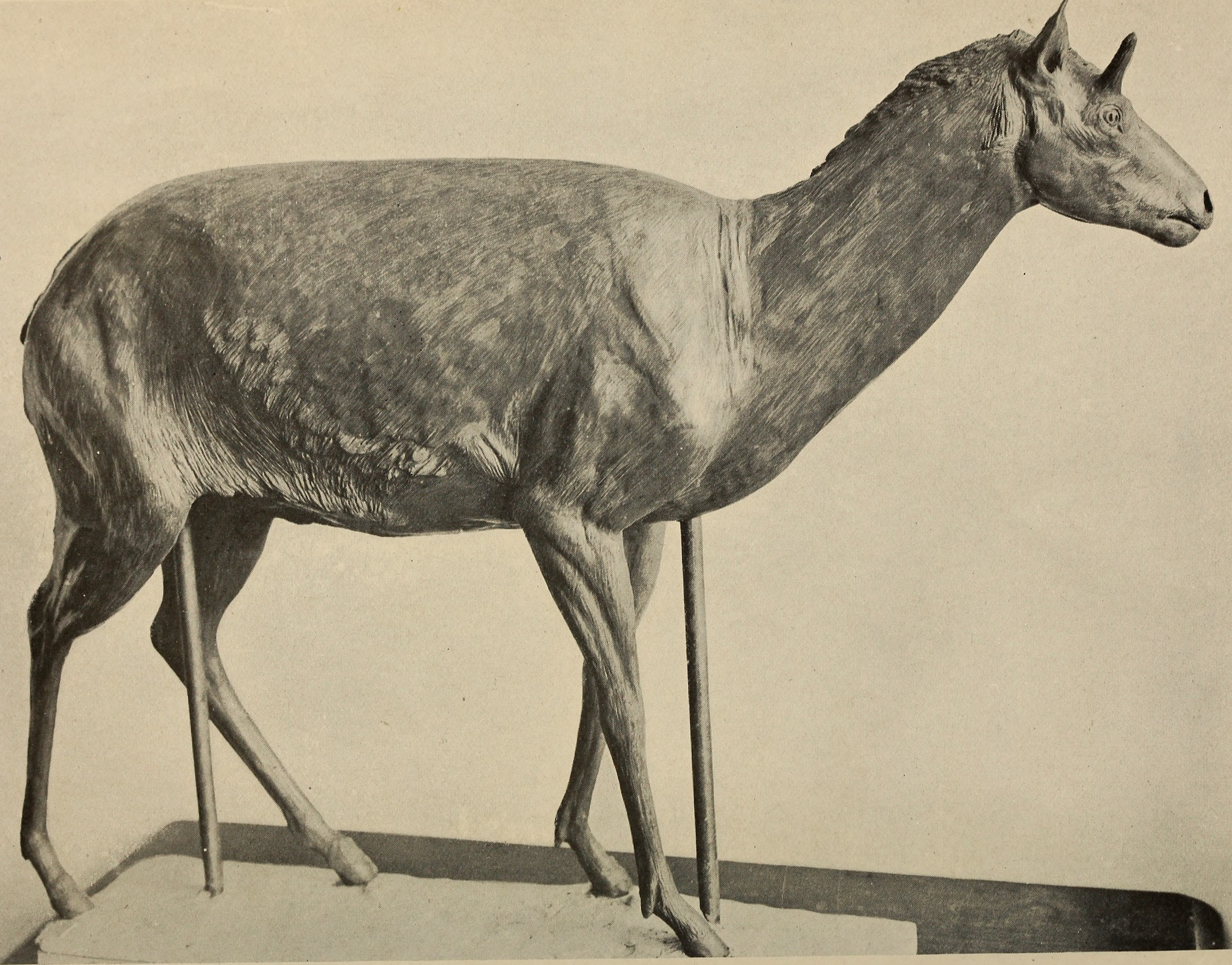
- Aletomeryx
  †Aletomeryx
- Aleurites
- †Allognathosuchus
- †Allophylus
- Alnus
- †Amentotaxus
- Amia
- †Amitabha – type locality for genus
  - †Amitabha urbsinterdictensis – type locality for species
- †Ampelopsis
- †Amphechinus
- Amphiuma
- Amyda
- †Anamirta – or unidentified comparable form
- Anas
  - †Anas acuta
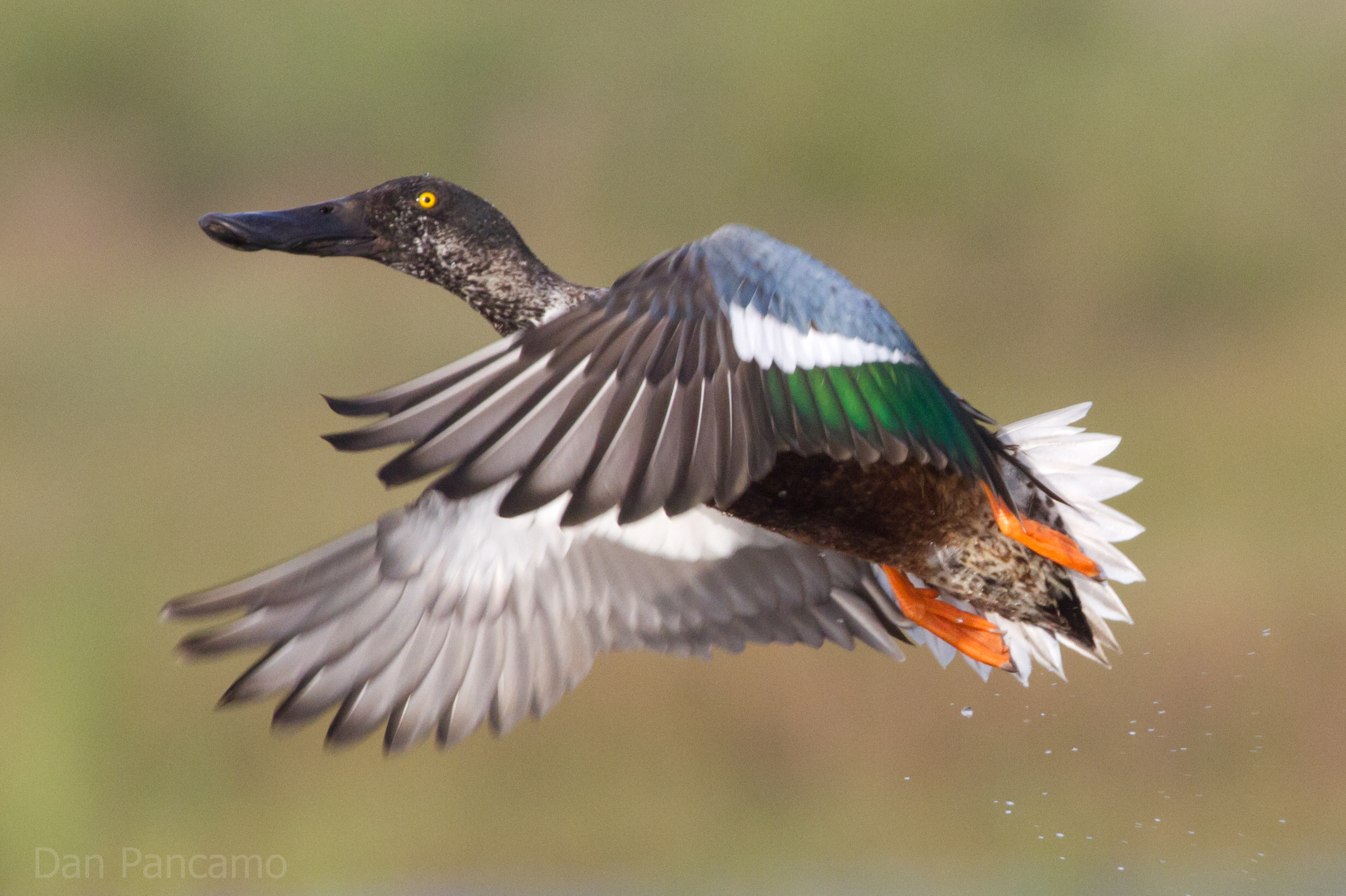
  - A living Spatula clypeata, or northern shoveler
    †Anas clypeata
  - †Anas crecca
  - †Anas platyrhynchos
- †Anconodon
- †Anemia
- †Anniealexandria – type locality for genus
- †Anobium
- †Anolbanolis – type locality for genus
  - †Anolbanolis banalis – type locality for species
  - †Anolbanolis geminus – type locality for species
- †Anosteira
- †Antherophagus
- Anthonomus
- Antilocapra
  - †Antilocapra americana
- Apalone
- †Aphelops
- Aquila
  - †Aquila chrysaetos
- Aralia
- Araneus
- †Araucaria
- †Archaeocyon
- †Archaeotherium
- †Archaerhineura – type locality for genus
- †Arctocyon
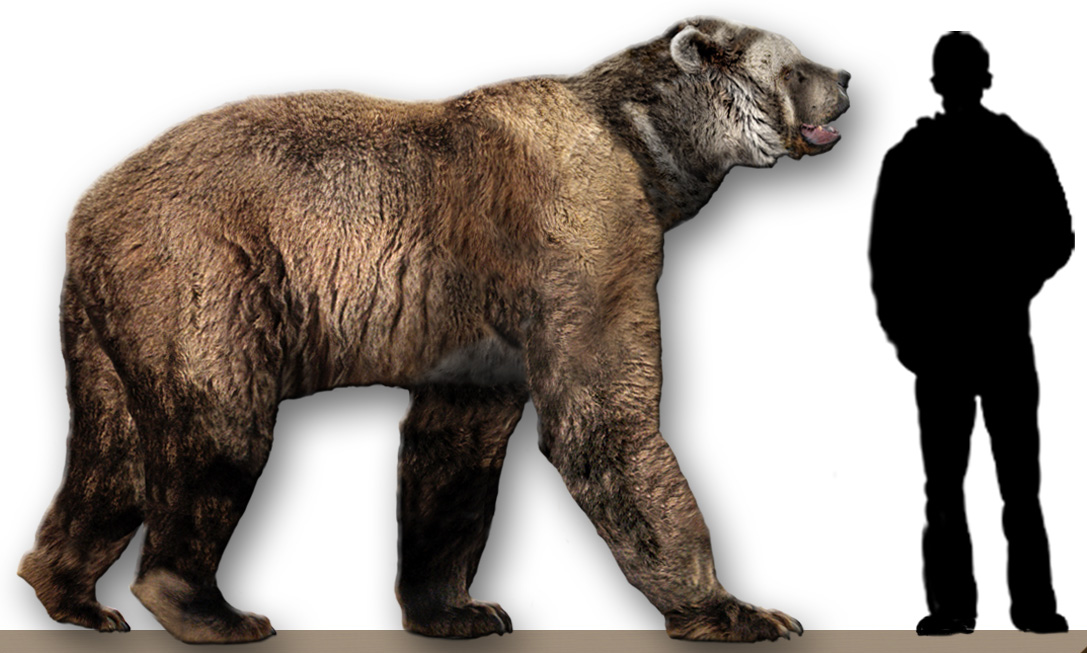
- Restoration of an Arctodus, or short-faced bear, with a human to scale
  †Arctodus
  - †Arctodus simus
- †Arctostaphylos
- †Arenahippus
- †Aristolochia
- †Armintomys
  - †Armintomys tullbergi
- †Artocarpus – tentative report
- †Asarkina
- Asio
  - †Asio flammeus
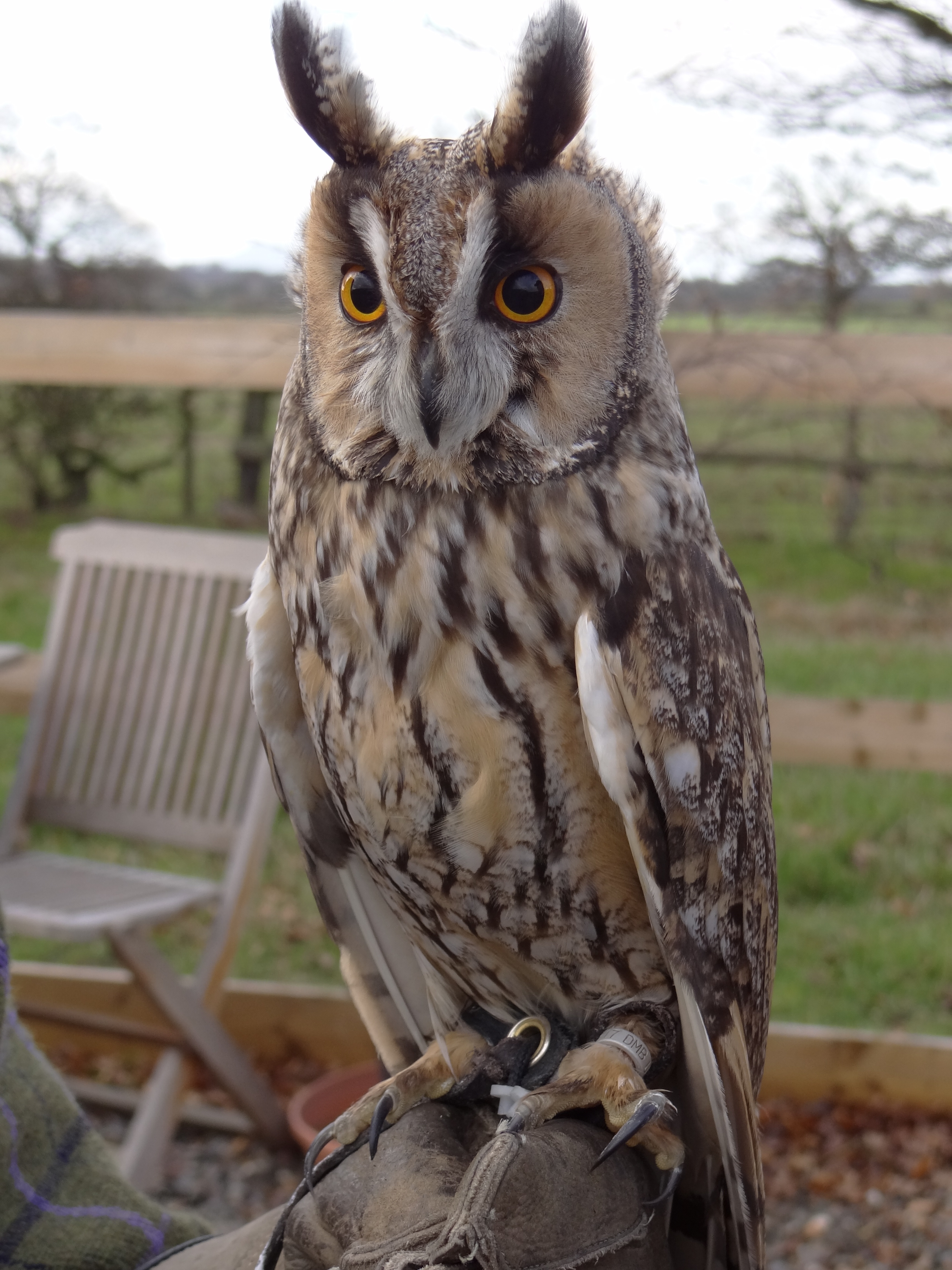
  - A living Asio otus, or long-eared owl
    †Asio otus
- †Asplenium
- †Astronium
- †Athyana
- †Avunculus
- Aythya
  - †Aythya collaris
- Azolla
- †Babibasiliscus – type locality for genus
- †Baena
- †Bahndwivici – type locality for genus
  - †Bahndwivici ammoskius – type locality for species
- †Baiotomeus
  - †Baiotomeus douglassi
  - †Baiotomeus lamberti
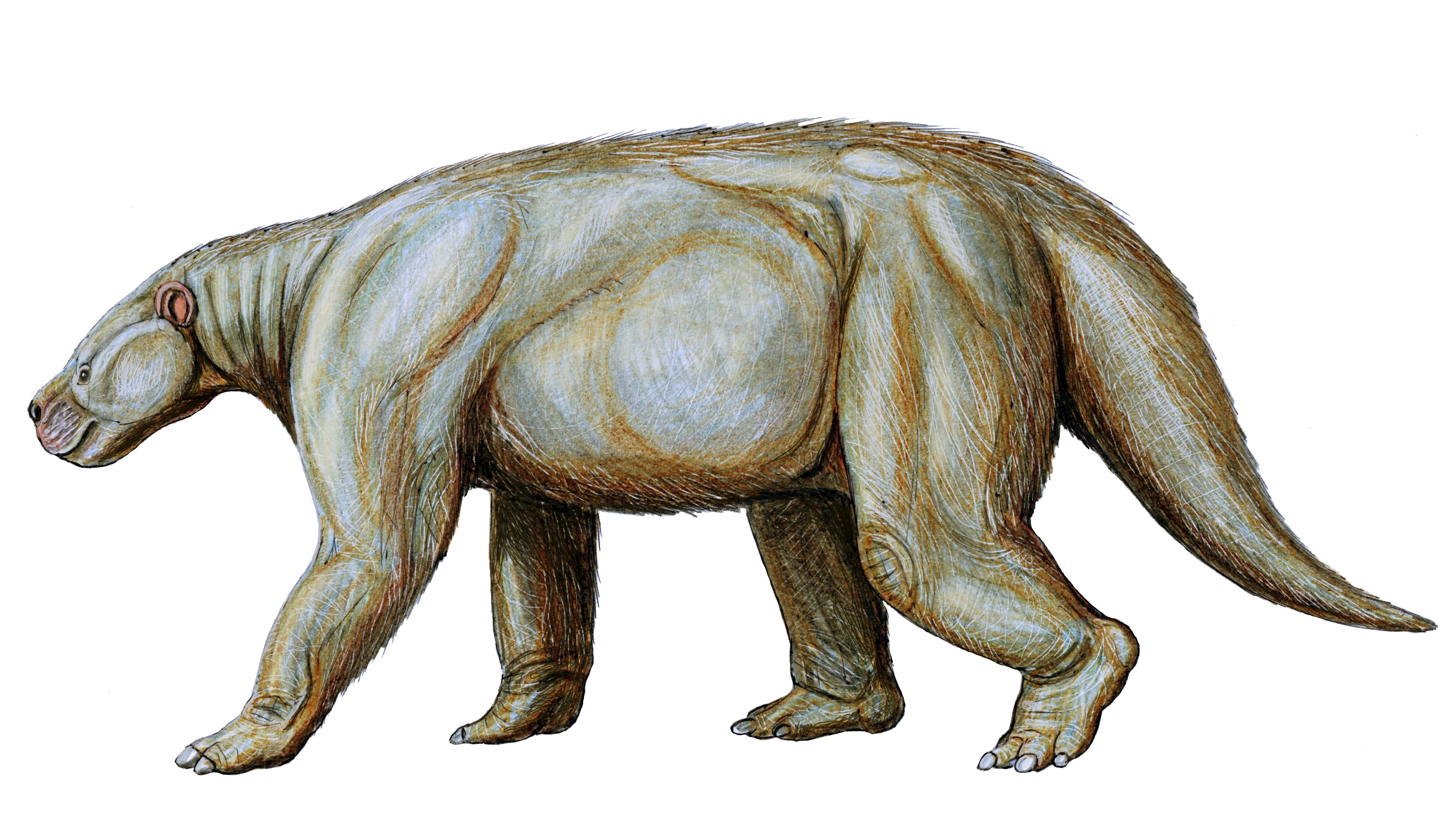
- Life restoration of the Paleocene-Eocene pantodont mammal Barylambda
  †Barylambda
- †Bathornis
- †Bathygenys
- †Bathyopsis
- †Batodonoides
  - †Batodonoides vanhouteni – type locality for species
- †Batrachosauroides – tentative report
- Bauhinia
- †Beilschmiedia
- †Berosus
- Betula
- Biomphalaria
- Bison
  - †Bison bison
- †Bisonalveus – type locality for genus
  - †Bisonalveus browni – type locality for species
- †Blechnum
- Bledius
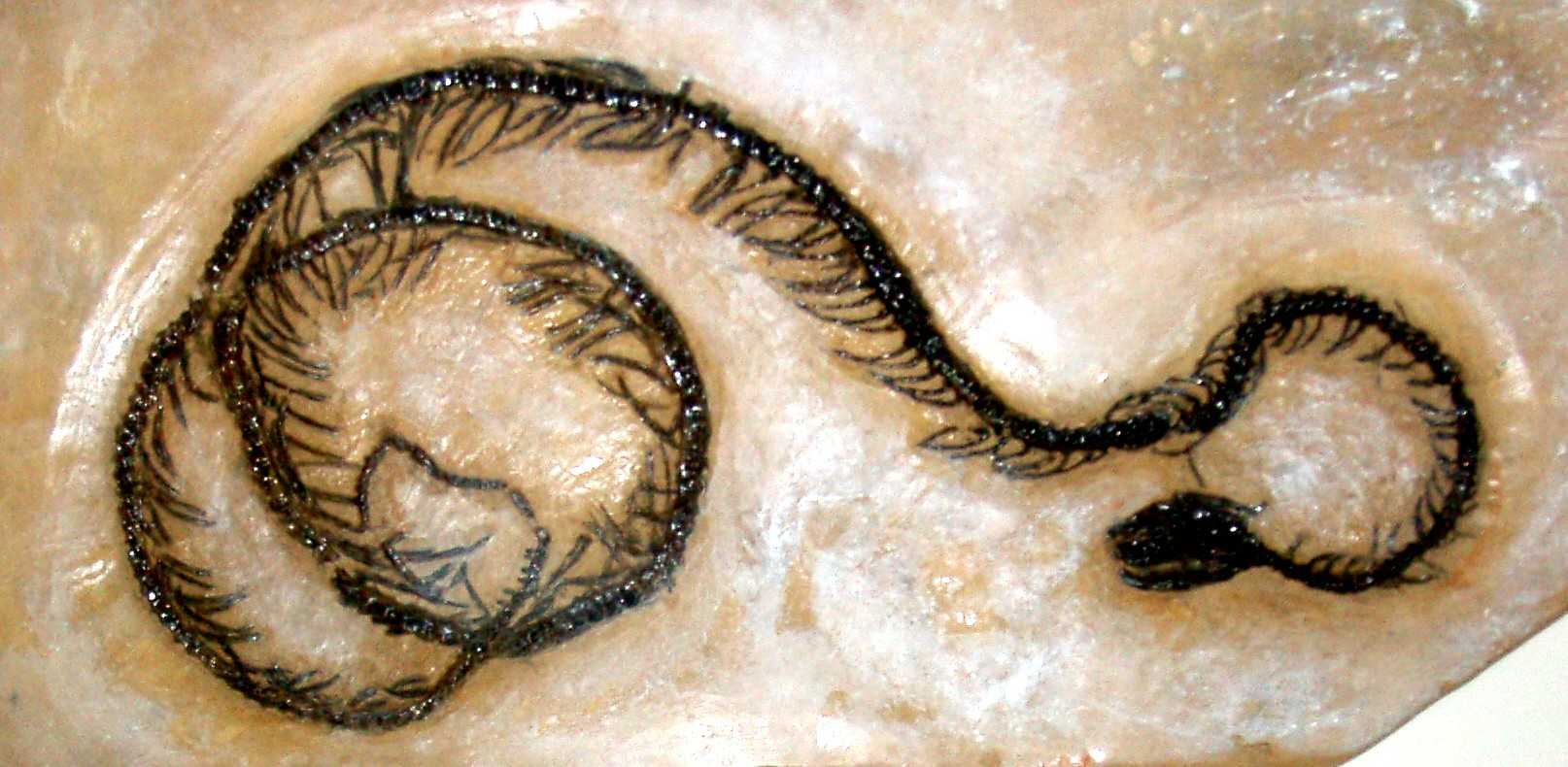
- Fossilized skeleton of the eocene-?Miocene boa snake Boavus
  †Boavus – type locality for genus
- Boletina
- †Bootherium
  - †Bootherium bombifrons
- †Borealosuchus
  - †Borealosuchus formidabilis
  - †Borealosuchus wilsoni – type locality for species
- †Boverisuchus
  - †Boverisuchus vorax
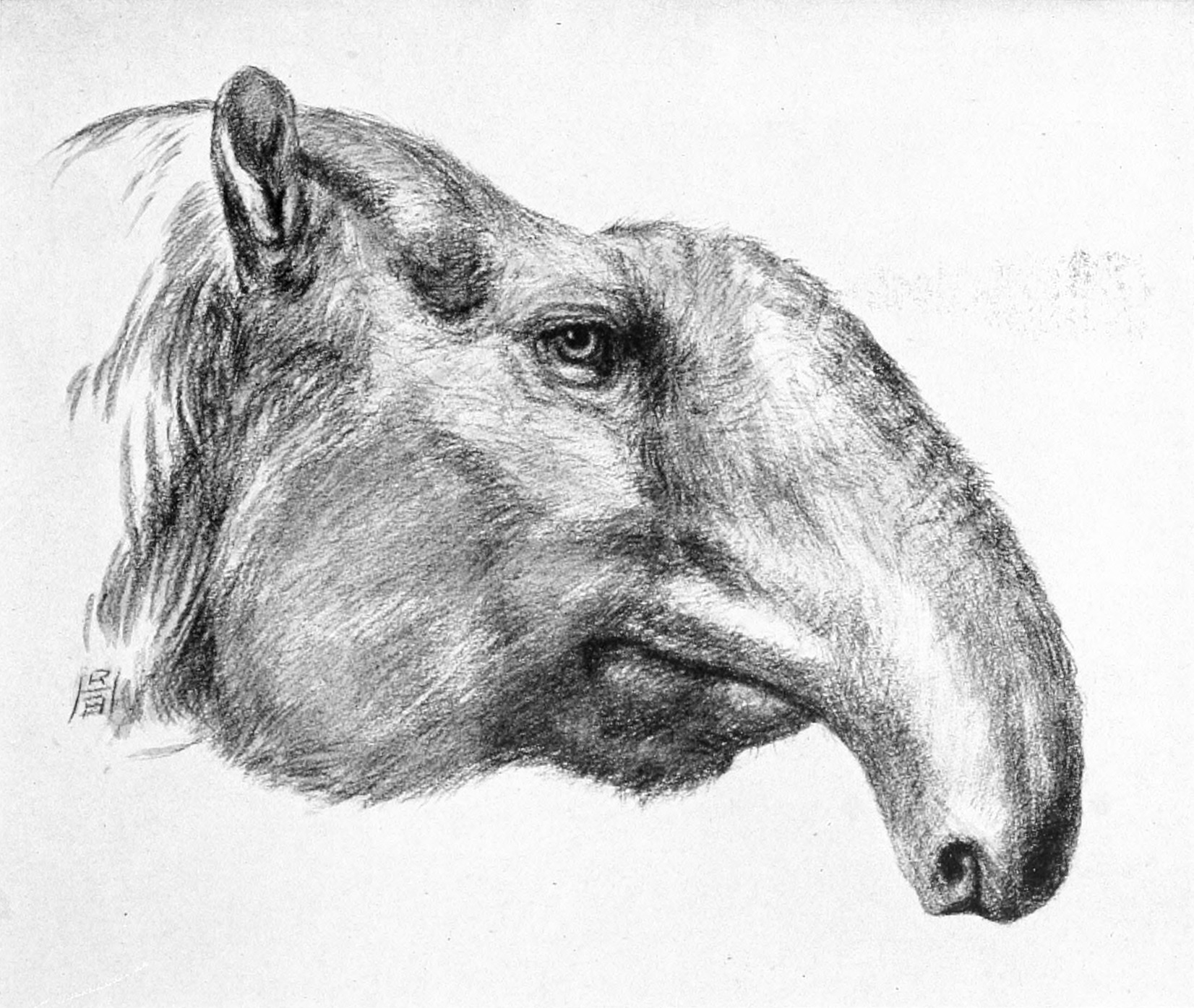
- Restorative portrait of the Miocene oreodont mammal Brachycrus
  †Brachycrus
- †Brachyhyops
- †Brachyrhynchocyon
- †Brachyuranochampsa – type locality for genus
  - †Brachyuranochampsa eversolei – type locality for species
- Bracon
- Branta
  - †Branta canadensis
- †Brontops
- †Bryophyte – or unidentified related form
- Bubo
  - †Bubo virginianus
- Buteo
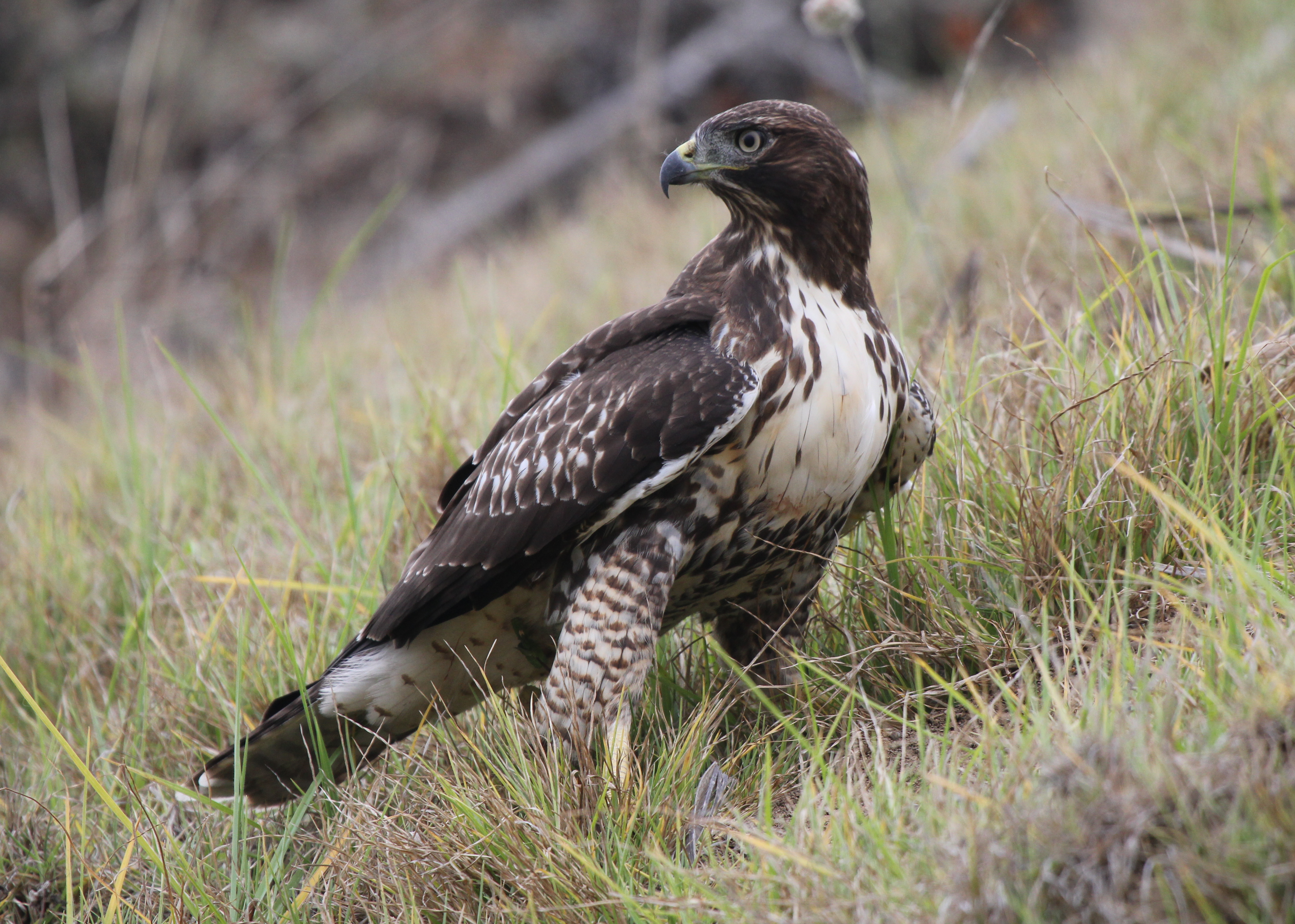
  - A living Buteo jamaicensis, or red-tailed hawk
    †Buteo jamaicensis
  - †Buteo lagopus
  - †Buteo regalis – or unidentified comparable form
- Buteogallus
- †Caedocyon
  - †Caedocyon tedfordi – type locality for species
- †Caenopus
- †Caesalpinia
- †Calamospiza
  - †Calamospiza melanocorys
- Calidris
  - †Calidris melanotos
- †Callomyia
- †Camelops
  - †Camelops hesternus – or unidentified comparable form
- †Canarium
- †Canavalia
- Canis
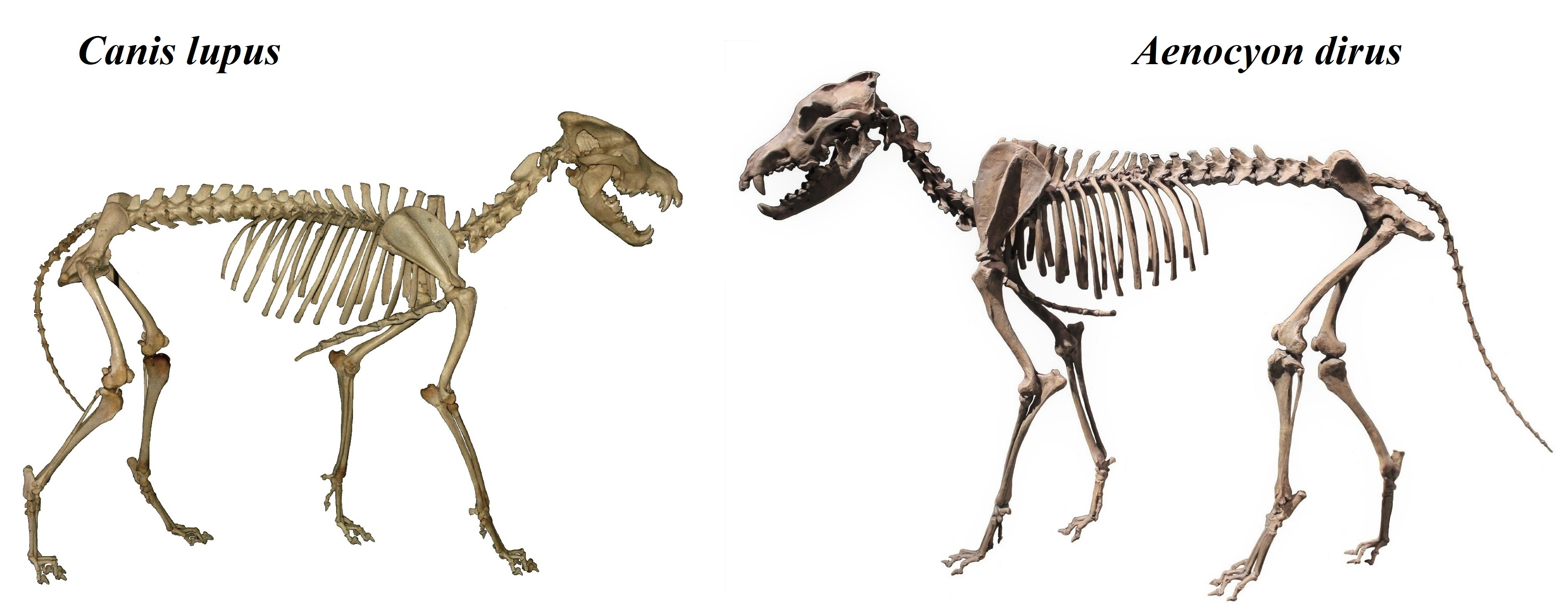
  - Modern mounted skeleton of Canis lupus, the grey wolf, to scale with a fossilized skeleton of the Pleistocene wolf Canis dirus, or dire wolf
    †Canis dirus
  - †Canis latrans
  - †Canis lupus
- †Cantius
  - †Cantius abditus – type locality for species
  - †Cantius frugivorus
  - †Cantius mckennai
  - †Cantius ralstoni
  - †Cantius torresi
  - †Cantius trigonodus – type locality for species
- Capella
  - †Capella gallinago
- Caracara
  - †Caracara plancus
- †Cardiospermum
- Carduelis
- †Carpolestes
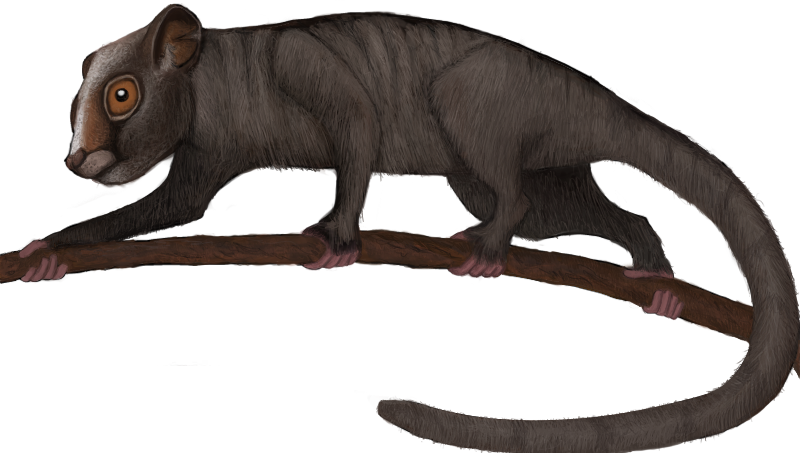
  - Life restoration of the Paleocene primate relative Carpolestes simpsoni
    †Carpolestes simpsoni – type locality for species
- Carya
- Castanea
- Castor
- †Catopsalis
  - †Catopsalis alexanderi
  - †Catopsalis calgariensis
- Cedrela
- †Cedrobaena – type locality for genus
- †Celastrus
- Celtis
- †Centrocercus
  - †Centrocercus urophasianus
- †Cephalogale
- †Ceratophyllum
  - †Ceratophyllum muricatum
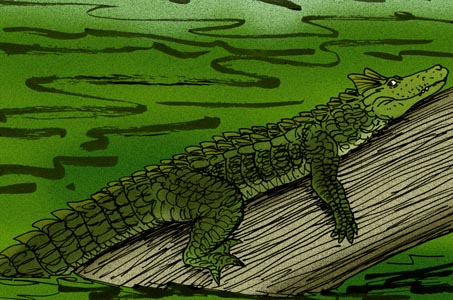
- Life restoration of the Paleocene-Eocene crocodilian Ceratosuchus
  †Ceratosuchus
  - †Ceratosuchus burdoshi
- Cercidiphyllum
- †Cercopis
- †Champsosaurus
- Chara
- Charadrius
  - †Charadrius montanus
  - †Charadrius vociferus
- Charina
- Cheilosia
- †Chelomophrynus – type locality for genus
- †Chilostigma – tentative report
- Chironomus
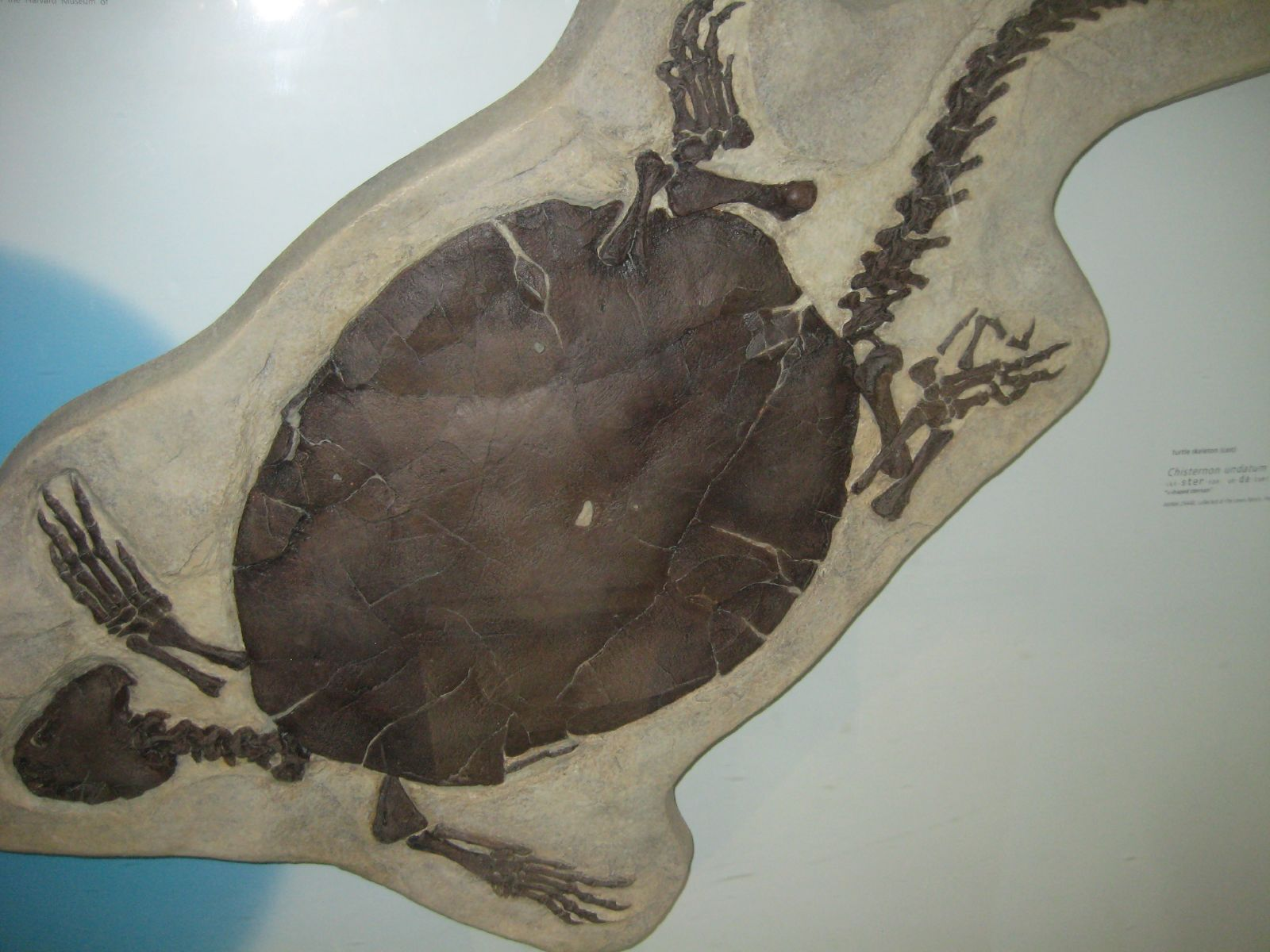
- Fossilized skeleton of the Eocene turtle Chisternon
  †Chisternon
- †Cholula
- †Choragus
- †Chordeiles
  - †Chordeiles minor
- †Chriacus
  - †Chriacus oconostotae
- †Cimolestes
- Cinnamomum
- Circus
  - †Circus cyaneus
- Cissus
- †Cixius – tentative report
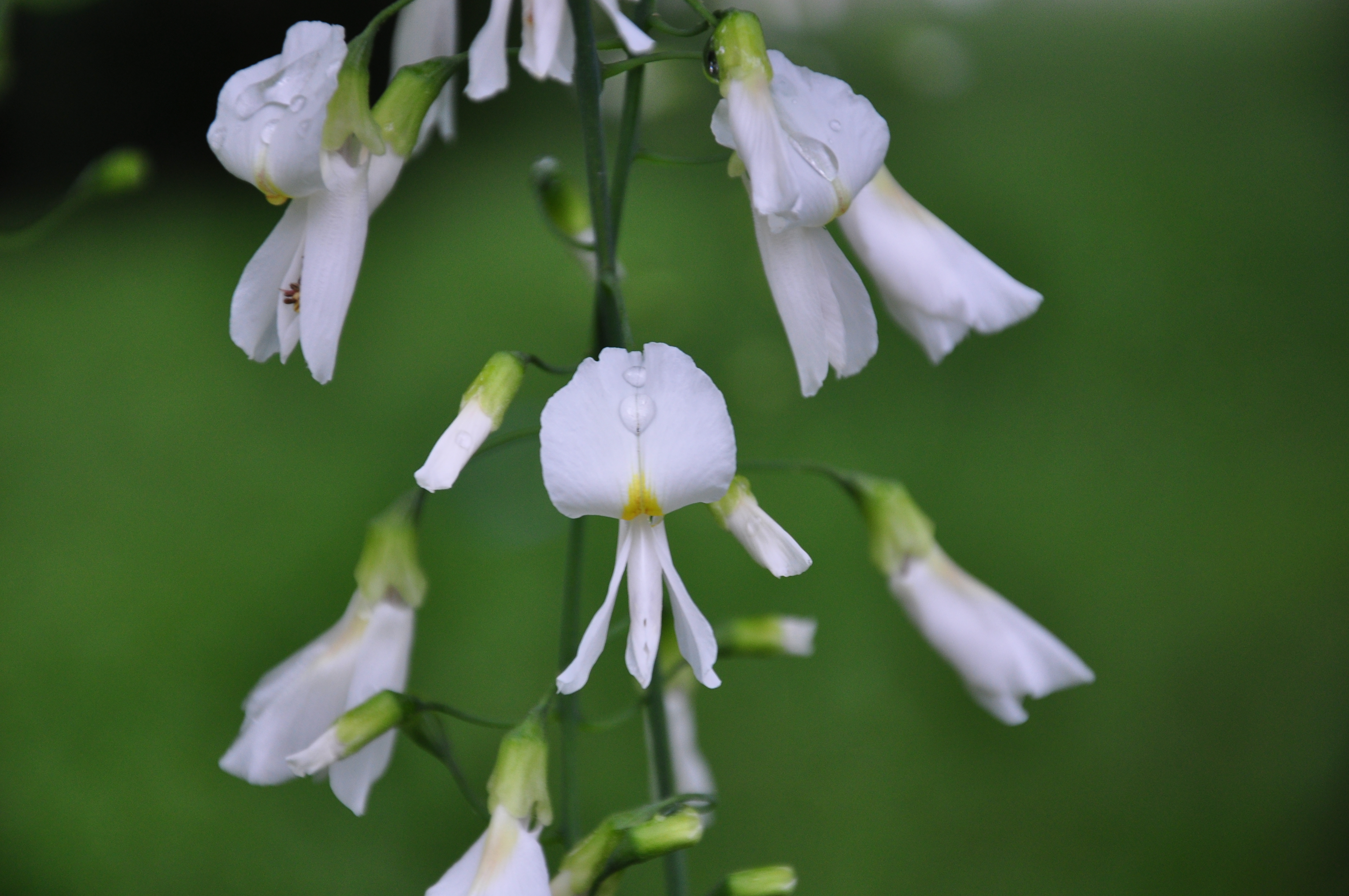
- Flowers of a living Cladrastis, or yellowwood
  Cladrastis
- †Cnemidaria
- †Coccothraustes
  - †Coccothraustes vespertinus
- Cocculus
- Colaptes
  - †Colaptes auratus
- †Colodon
- †Compsemys
- †Coniophis
- †Copecion
- †Copelemur
- †Corizus – tentative report
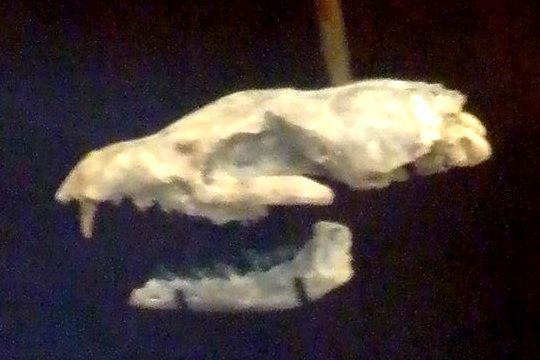
- Fossilized skull of the Oligocene-Miocene bone-crushing dog Cormocyon
  †Cormocyon
- Cornus
- Corvus
  - †Corvus brachyrhynchos
  - †Corvus corax
- †Corylus
- †Coryphodon
- Crataegus
- †Credneria
- Crocodylus
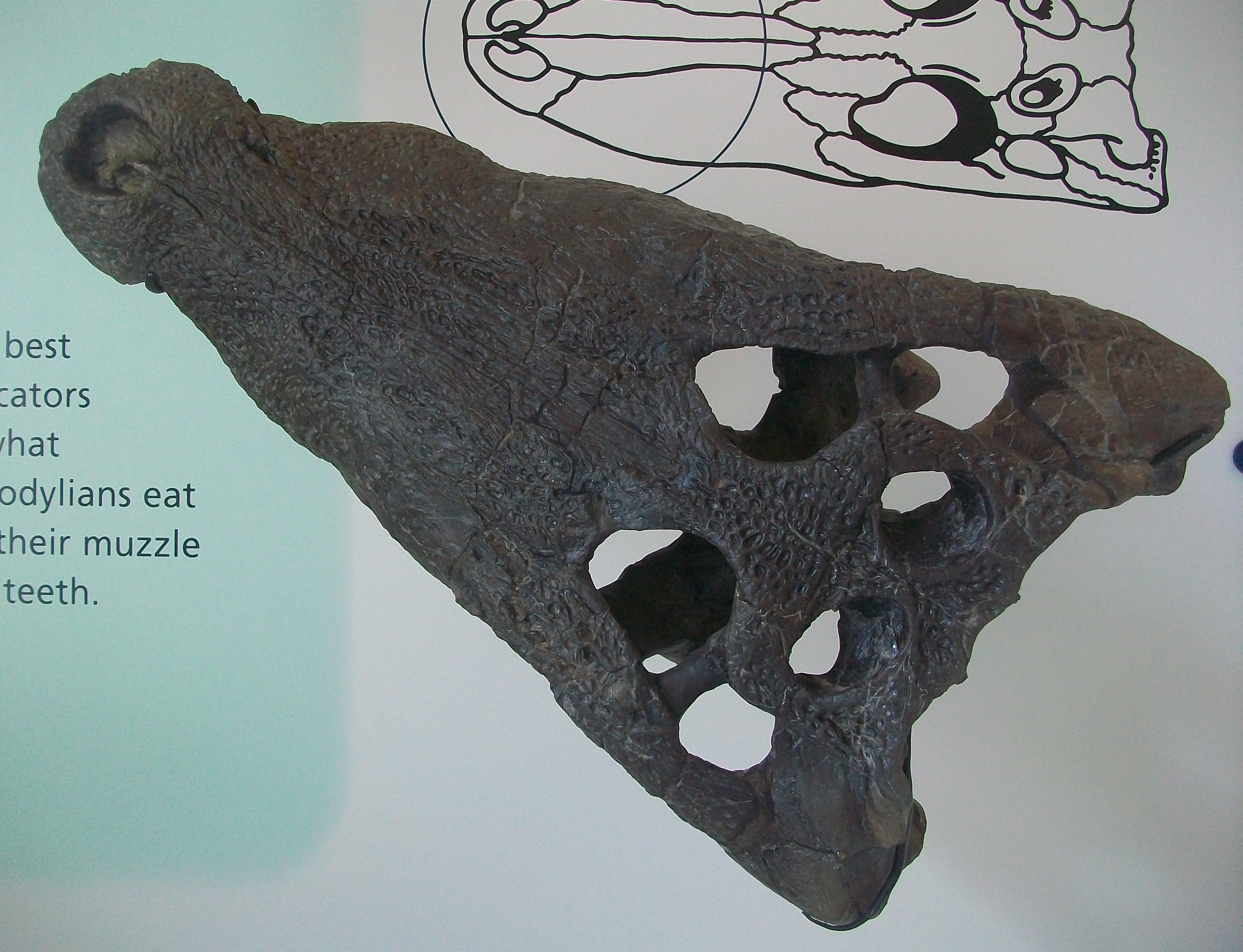
  - Fossilized skull of the Eocene crocodilian "Crocodylus" affinis
    †Crocodylus affinis – type locality for species
- †Cryptocephalus
- Cryptorhynchus
- Cryptotis
- Culex
- Cyclocarya
- †Cynarctoides
  - †Cynarctoides acridens
  - †Cynarctoides harlowi
  - †Cynarctoides luskensis – type locality for species
- †Dalbergia
- †Daphoenictis
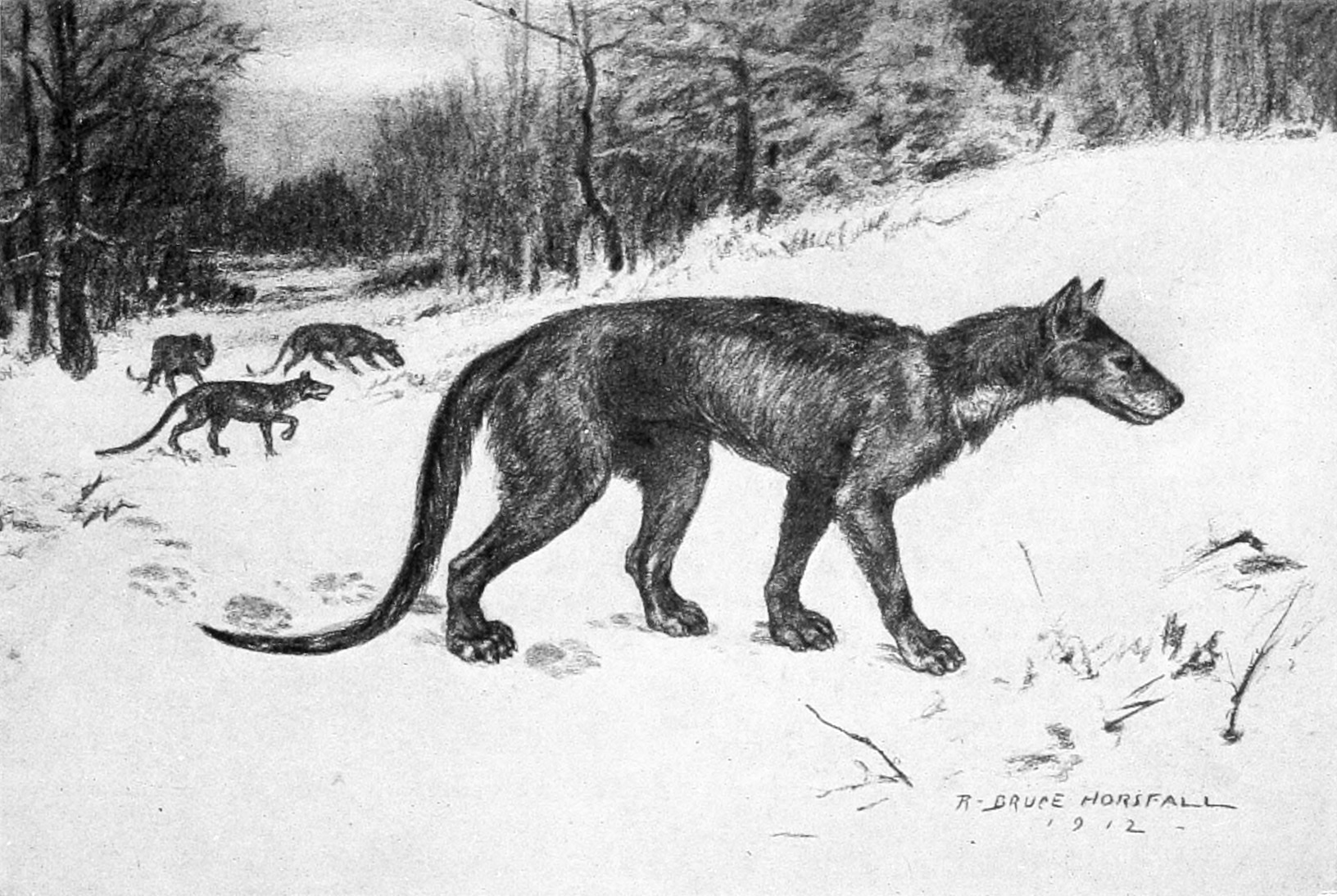
- Life restoration of the Miocene bear-dog Daphoenodon
  †Daphoenodon
- †Daphoenus
  - †Daphoenus lambei
- Dasyatis
- †Davidia
- †Dawsonicyon – type locality for genus
- Dendragapus
  - †Dendragapus obscurus
- †Dendropanax
- †Dennstaedtia
- †Desmatippus
- †Desmatochoerus
- †Desmocyon
- †Diacodexis
- †Diatryma – type locality for genus
- †Diceratherium
- Dicranomyia
- Dicrostonyx
- †Didymictis
- †Dilophodon
- †Dinictis
- †Dinohyus
- †Diospyros
- †Diplocynodon
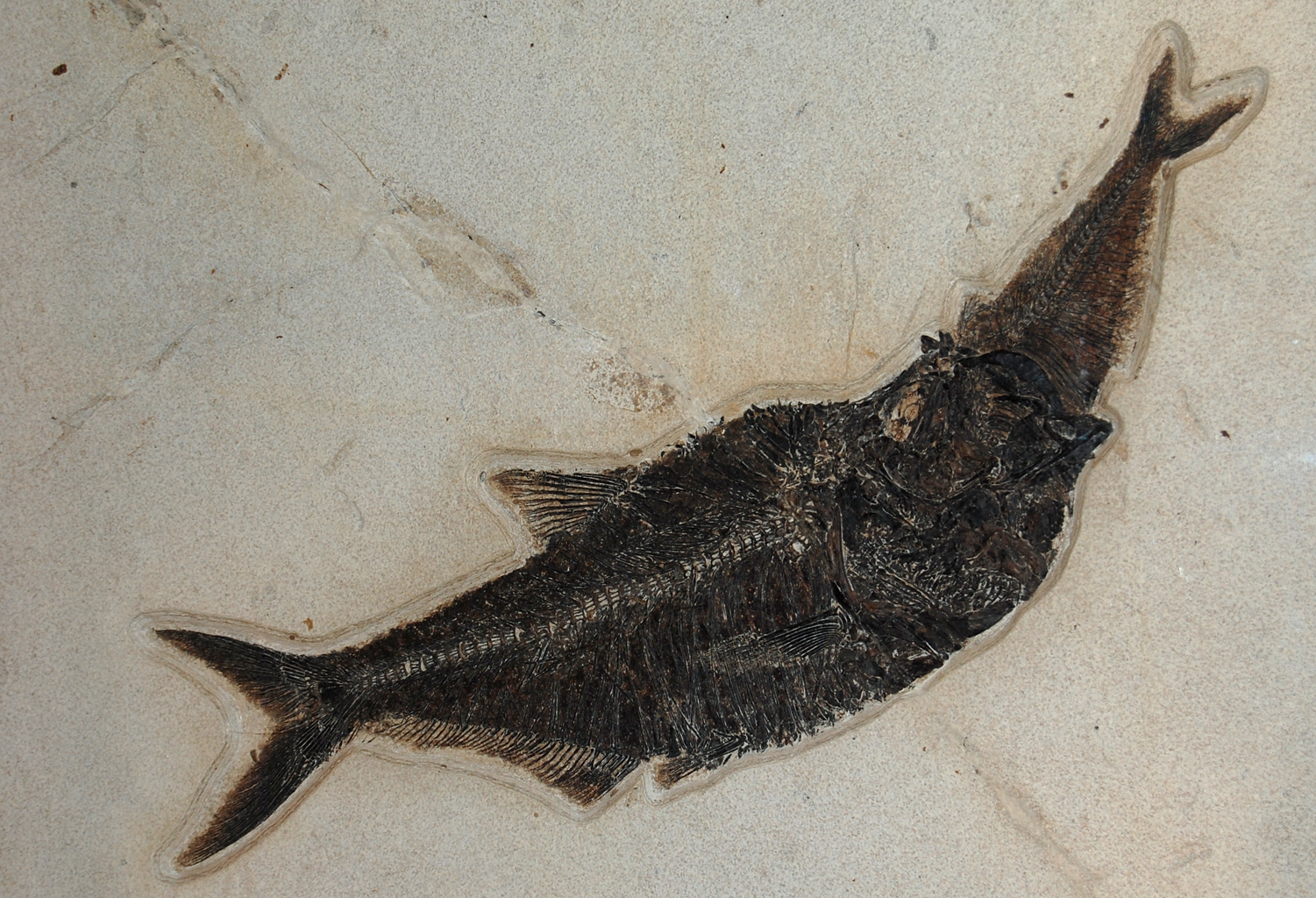
- Fossilized skeleton of the Early Cretaceous-Eocene bony fish Diplomystus preserved in the act of swallowing another fish
  †Diplomystus
  - †Diplomystus dentatus
- †Dipoides
- Dipteronia
- Discus
- †Dissacus
- †Distylium
- Dolichopus
- †Dombeya
- †Domnina
- †Drimys
- Dryopteris
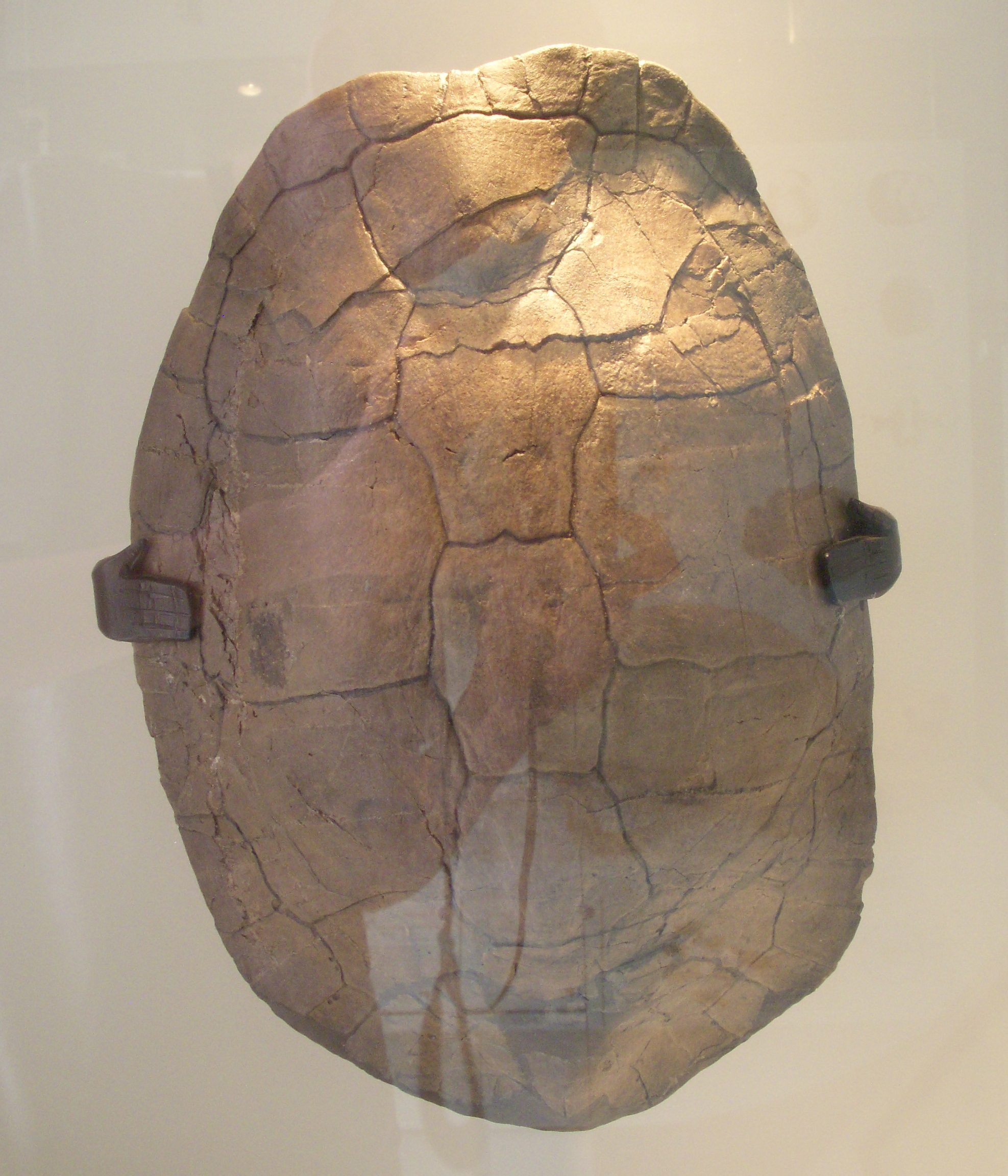
- Fossilized shell of the Eocene turtle Echmatemys
  †Echmatemys
- †Ectocion
- †Ectoconus
- †Ectopistes
  - †Ectopistes migratorius
- †Ectopocynus
- †Elaeodendron
- †Enhydrocyon
  - †Enhydrocyon basilatus
- Enochrus
- †Entelodon
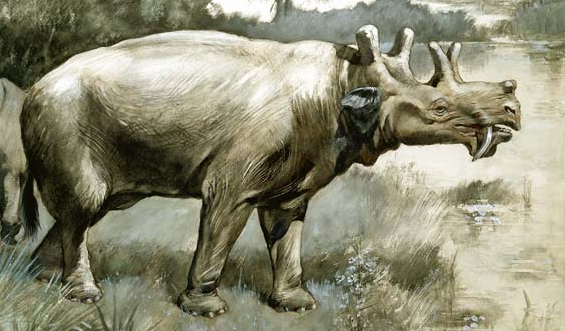
- Life restoration of a pair of the Eocene uintathere mammal Eobasileus. Charles R. Knight (1890s).
  †Eobasileus
  - †Eobasileus cornutus
- †Eoconodon
  - †Eoconodon copanus
- †Eohippus
- †Eorhinophrynus
- †Eostrix
- †Eotitanops
- †Epicaerus
- †Epihippus
- †Equisetum
- Equus
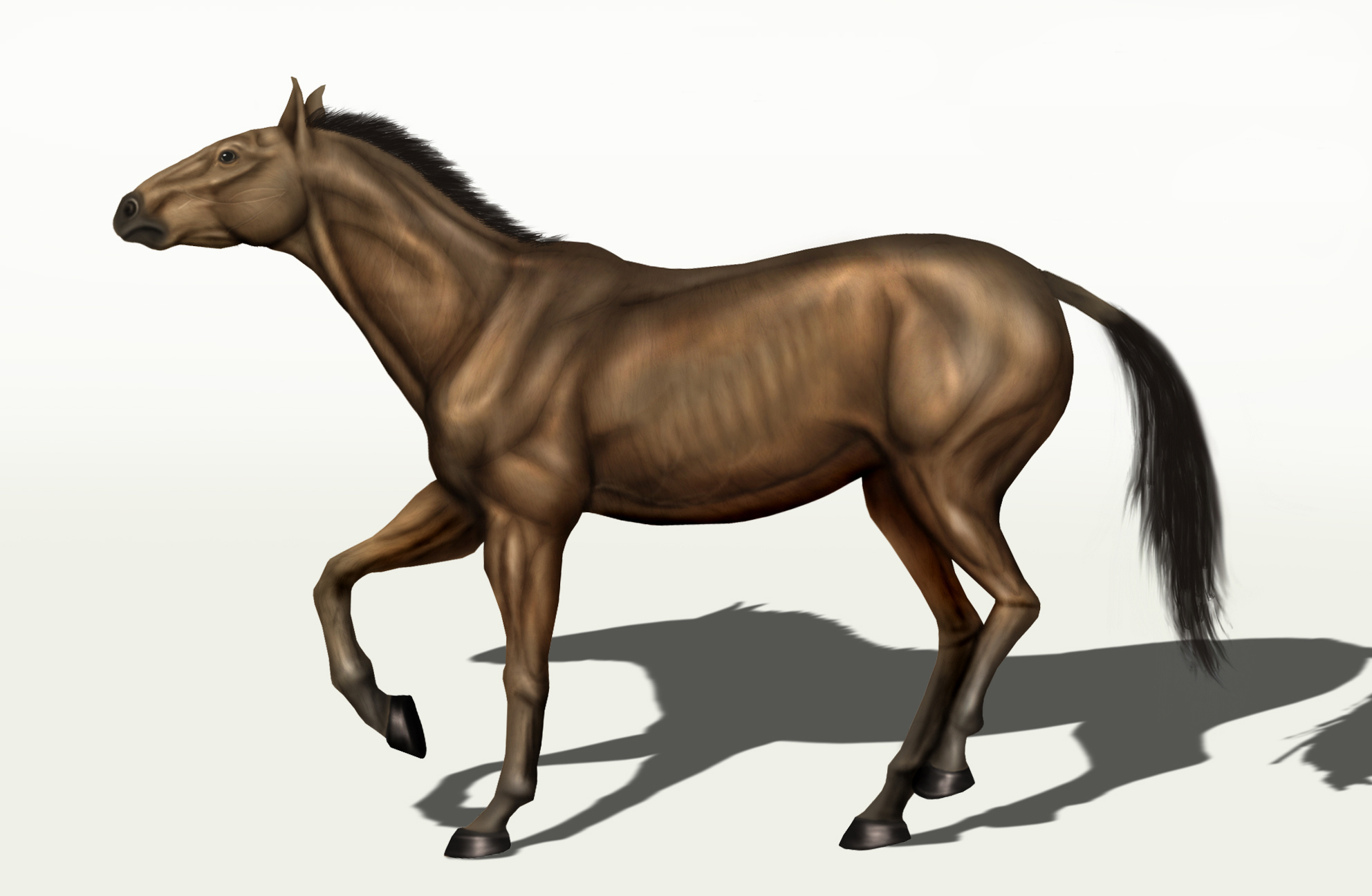
  - Restoration of the Pleistocene-Holocene Equus conversidens, or Mexican horse
    †Equus conversidens
- Eremophila
  - †Eremophila alpestris
- Erythrina
- Esox
- †Eucastor
- †Eucommia
- Eugenia
- †Euparius
- Euphagus
  - †Euphagus cyanocephalus
- †Eusmilus
- Eutamias
- Fagus
- Falco
  - †Falco columbarius
  - †Falco mexicanus
  - †Falco rusticolus
  - †Falco sparverius
- Ficus
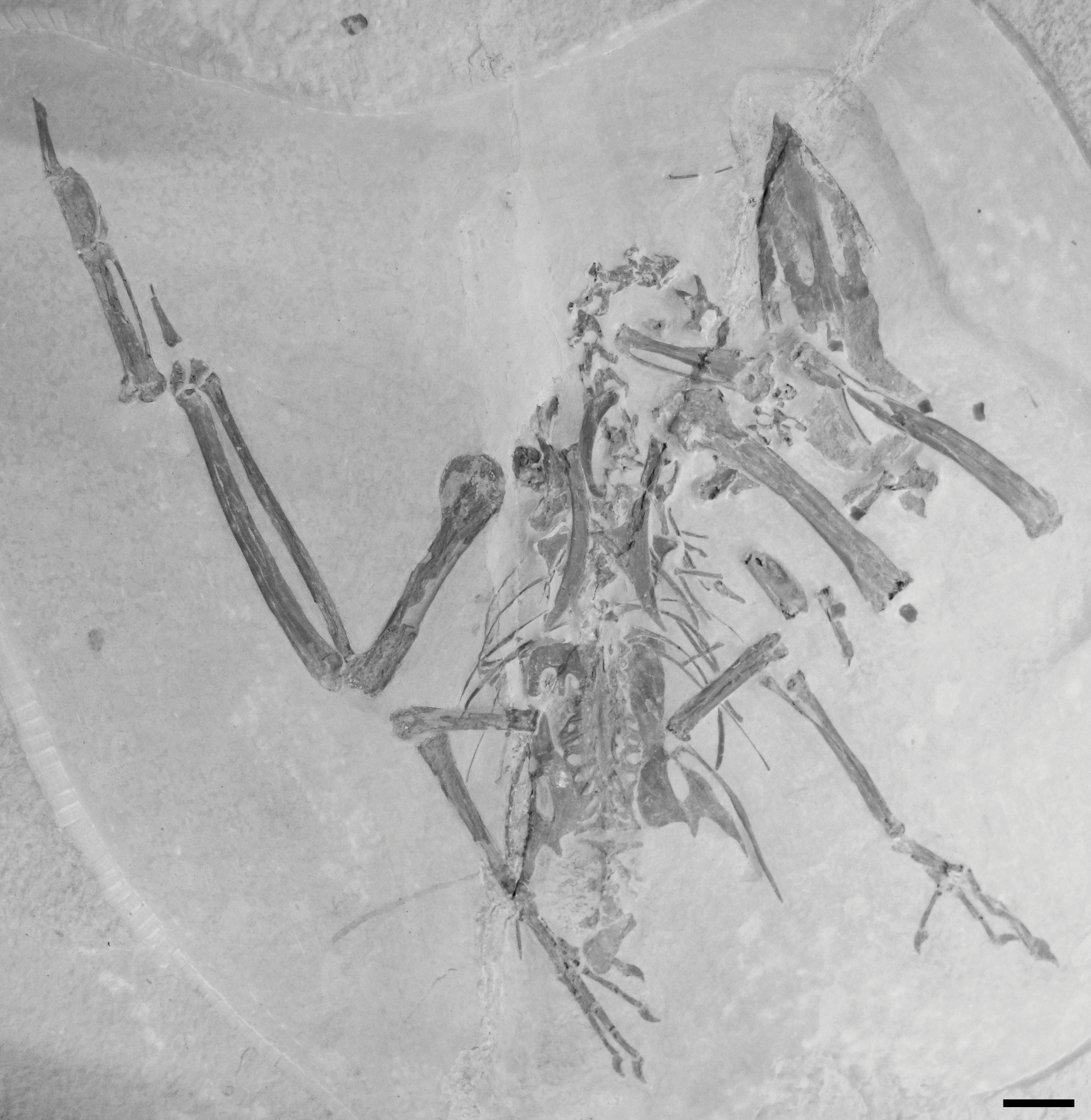
- Fossilized skeleton of the Eocene bird Fluvioviridavis
  †Fluvioviridavis – type locality for genus
- †Fortuna
- †Fraxinus
- †Fulgora
- †Gagadon
  - †Gagadon minimonstrum
- †Galecyon
- Galerita
- †Gallinuloides – type locality for genus
- Gastrocopta
- Gerrhonotus – or unidentified comparable form
- Ginkgo
  - †Ginkgo adiantoides
- †Gleditsia – or unidentified related form
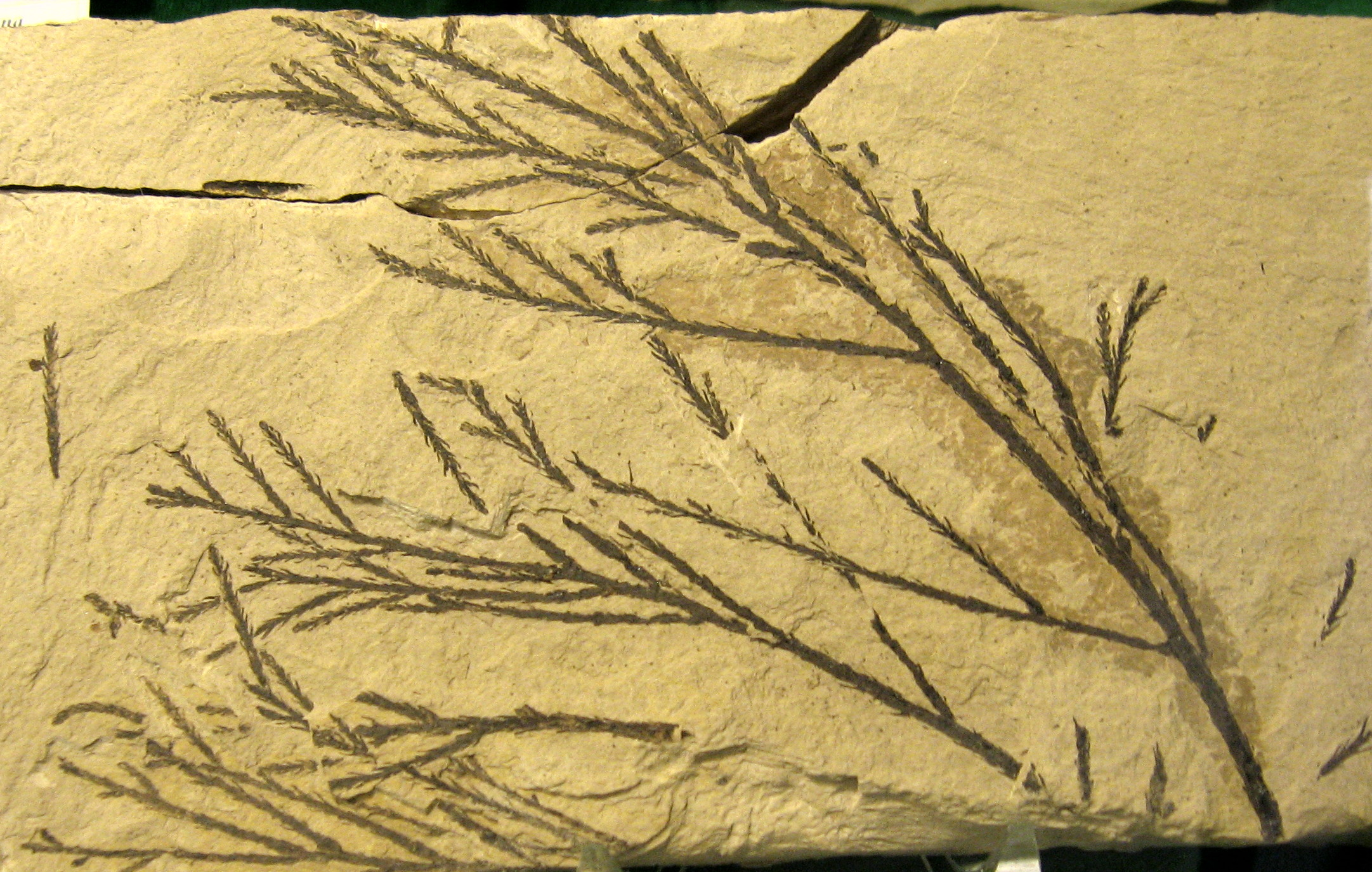
- Fossilized foliage of the cypress relative Glyptostrobus
  Glyptostrobus
  - †Glyptostrobus europaeus
- †Goniacodon
- Gopherus
- †Gracilocyon
- Grus
  - †Grus canadensis
- Gulo
  - †Gulo gulo
- †Gymnocladus
- Gyraulus – or unidentified comparable form
- †Habrosaurus
  - †Habrosaurus dilatus
- †Hadrianus
- †Hapalodectes
- †Hapalorestes
- †Haplolambda
- †Harpagolestes
- †Helaletes – type locality for genus
- †Helix
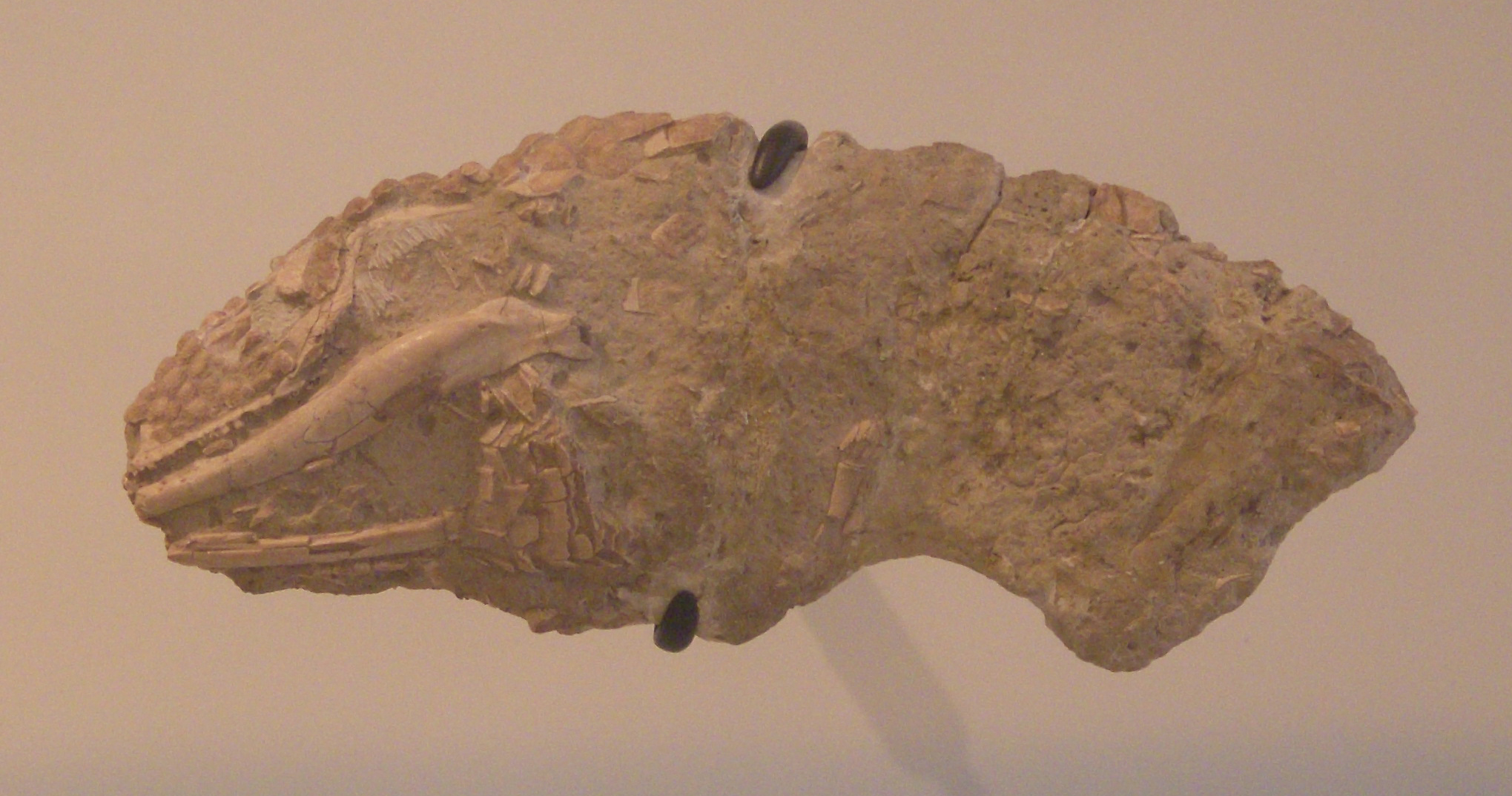
- Fossilized skull of the Oligocene lizard Helodermoides
  †Helodermoides
  - †Helodermoides tuberculatus
- †Hemiauchenia
- Hemitelia
- †Heptodon
- †Herpetotherium
  - †Herpetotherium knighti
- †Hesperocyon
- †Heteraletes
- Hirundo – or unidentified comparable form
  - †Hirundo pyrrhonota
- †Holospira
- †Homogalax
- †Hoplophoneus
- †Hovenia
- †Hutchemys
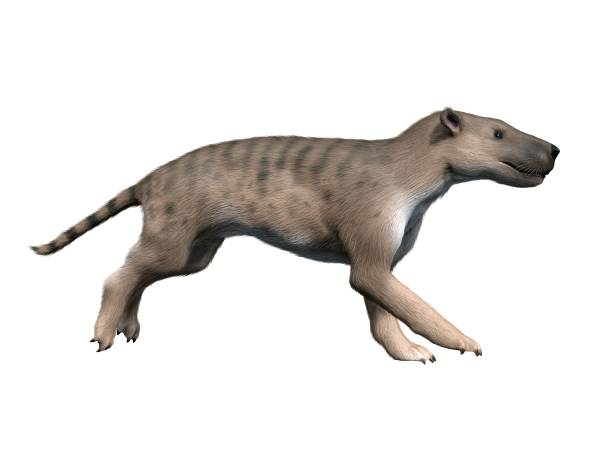
- Life restoration of the Eocene-Miocene creodont mammal Hyaenodon
  †Hyaenodon
  - †Hyaenodon crucians
  - †Hyaenodon horridus
  - †Hyaenodon megaloides
  - †Hyaenodon montanus
  - †Hyaenodon mustelinus
  - †Hyaenodon venturae
  - †Hyaenodon vetus
- Hydrangea
- Hydrobia – report made of unidentified related form or using admittedly obsolete nomenclature
- Hydrobius
- †Hydrochus
- †Hydromystria
- †Hylobius
- †Hyopsodus
  - †Hyopsodus lepidus – type locality for species
- †Hypertragulus
- †Hypisodus
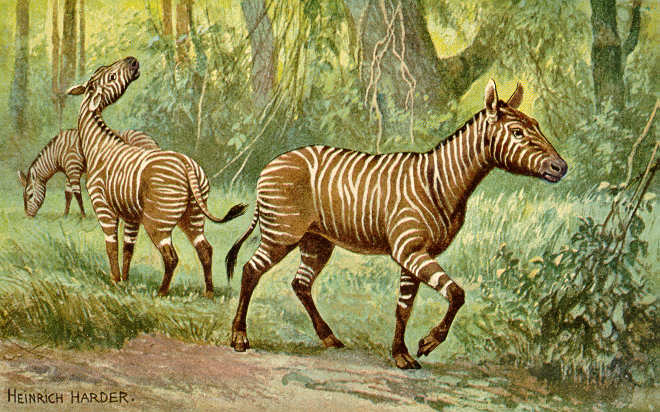
- Life restoration of the Miocene horse Hypohippus. Heinrich Harder (1920).
  †Hypohippus
- †Hypolagus
- †Hyporhina
- †Hypsiops
- †Hyrachyus
- †Hyracodon
- †Hyracotherium
  - †Hyracotherium vasacciense
- †Icaronycteris – type locality for genus
  - †Icaronycteris index – type locality for species
- †Indusia
- †Intyrictis
- †Ischyromys
- †Iulus
- Juglans
- †Juncitarsus – type locality for genus
- Junco – or unidentified comparable form
  - †Junco hyemalis
- †Kalmia
- †Kalobatippus
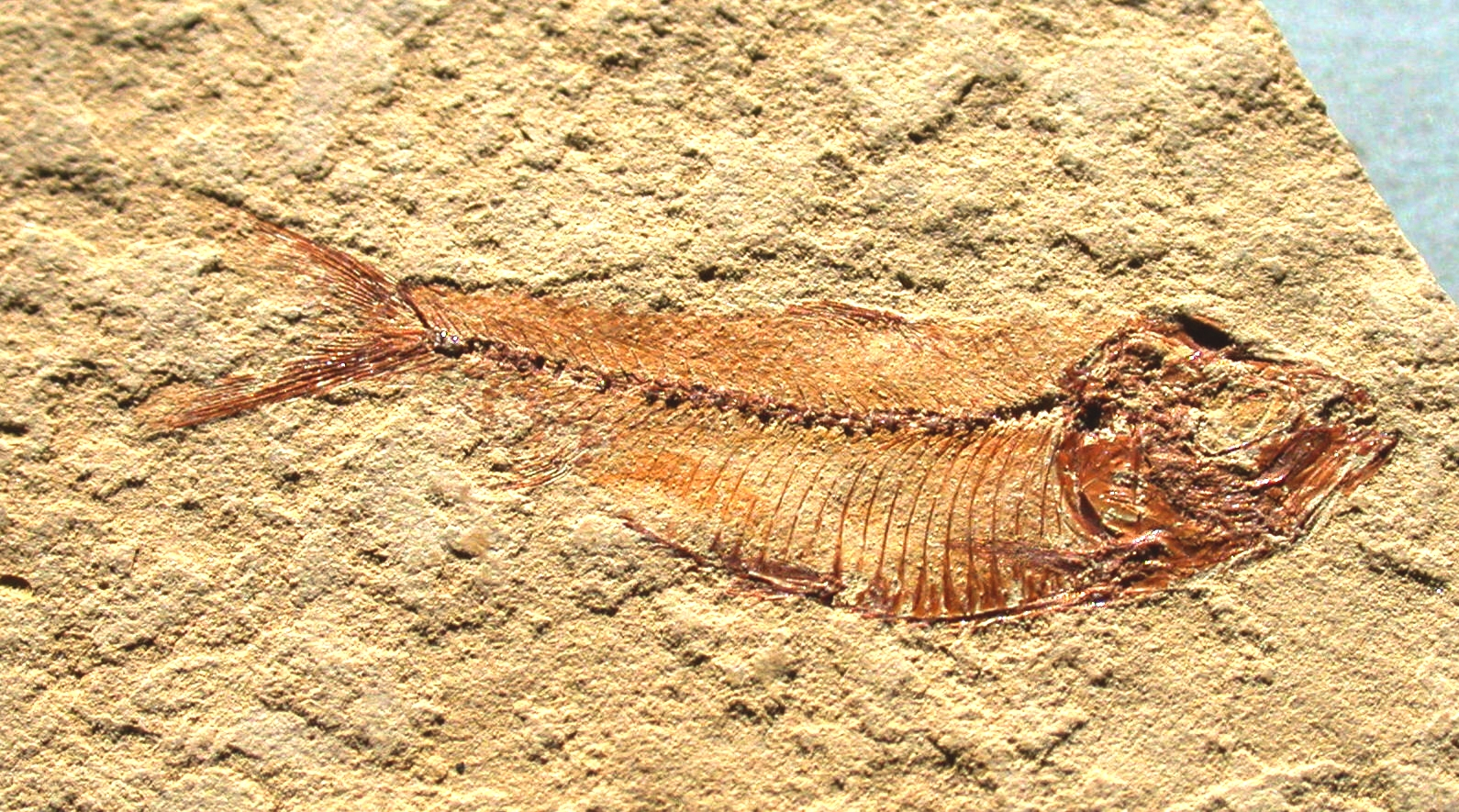
- Fossilized skeleton of the Eocene bony fish Knightia
  †Knightia
  - †Knightia eocaena
- Koelreuteria
- †Lagopus
  - †Lagopus leucurus – or unidentified comparable form
- †Lambdotherium
- †Lambertocyon
  - †Lambertocyon eximius
- Lanius
  - †Lanius ludovicianus
- Larus – or unidentified comparable form
- Lathrobium
- †Laurinoxylon
- Laurus
- Leiocephalus
- Lepisosteus
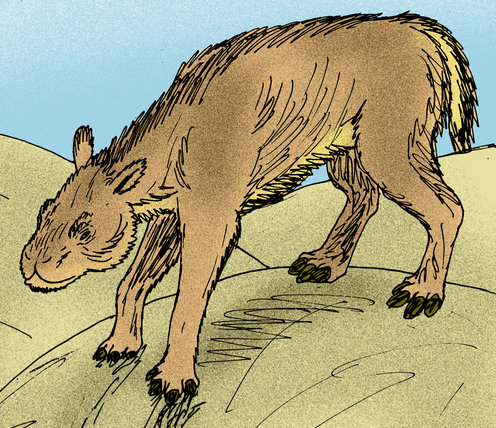
- Restoration of the Oligocene-Miocene oreodont mammal Leptauchenia
  †Leptauchenia
- †Leptictis
- †Leptocyon
- †Leptolambda
- †Leptomeryx
- †Leptoreodon
- †Leptotragulus
- Lepus
- †Leucosticte
  - †Leucosticte arctoa
- †Limnocyon
  - †Limnocyon verus – type locality for species
- †Limnofregata – type locality for genus
  - †Limnofregata azygosternon – type locality for species
- Lindera
- †Lisserpeton
  - †Lisserpeton bairdi
- †Listronotus
- †Lithophysa – type locality for genus
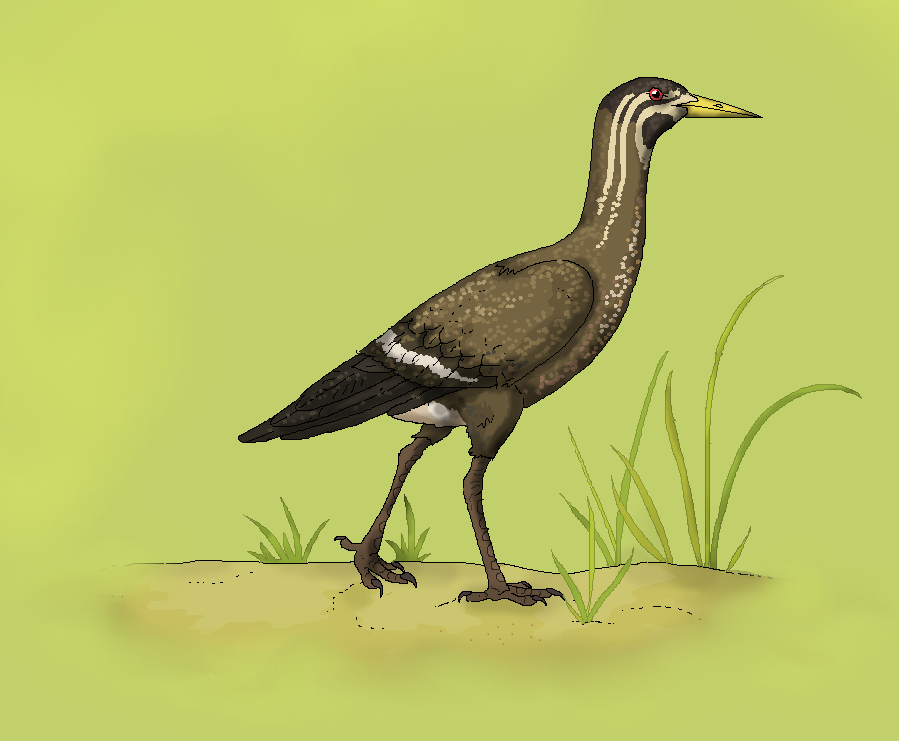
- Life restoration of the Paleocene-Eocene bird Lithornis
  †Lithornis
  - †Lithornis plebius – type locality for species
  - †Lithornis promiscuus – type locality for species
- Lygodium
- Lynx
  - †Lynx lynx – tentative report
- †Lystra – tentative report
- †Macginitiea
- †Machaeroides
- Macrocranion
- Magnolia
- †Maiorana
- †Mammacyon
- †Mammuthus
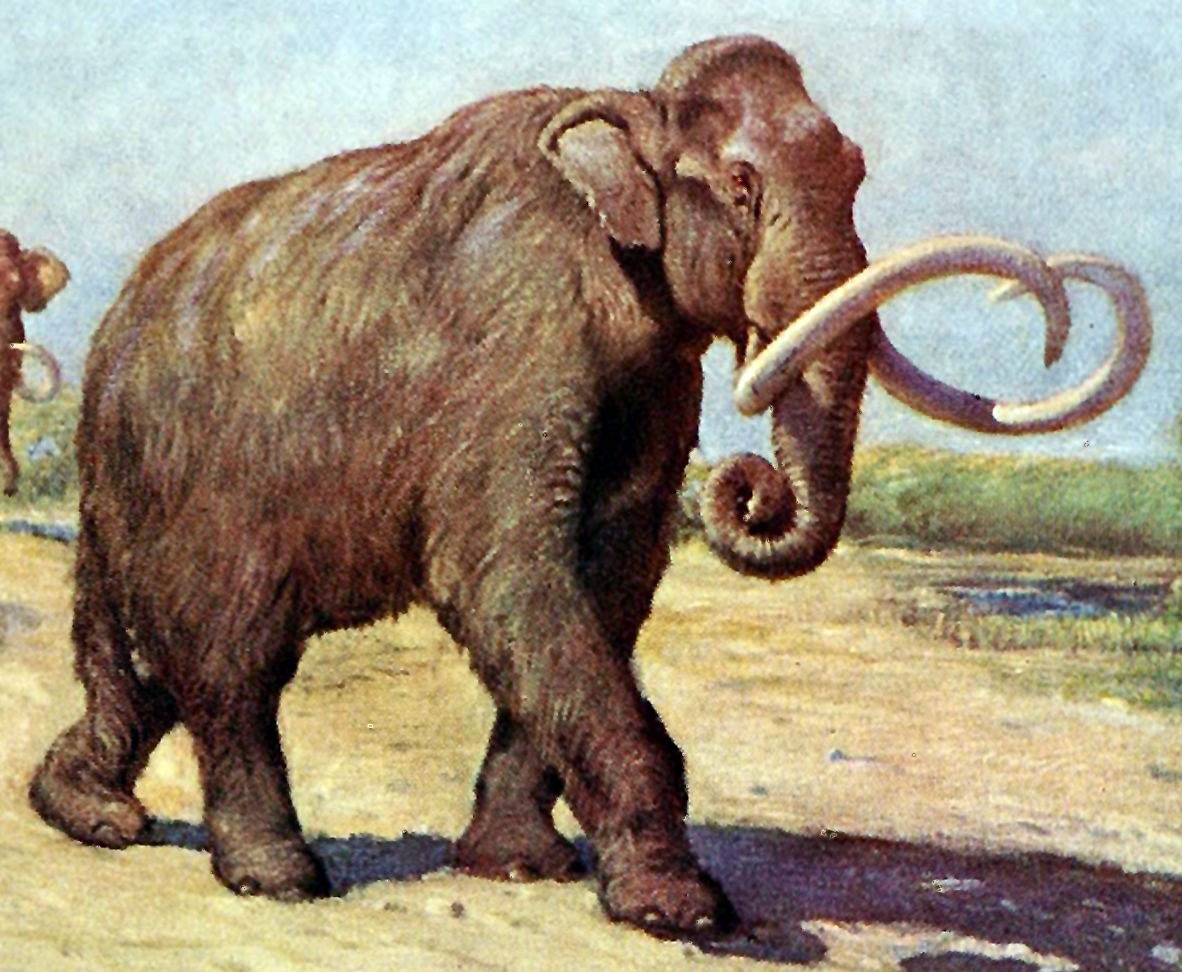
  - Life restoration of a herd of Mammuthus columbi, or Columbian mammoths. The extent of the fur depicted is hypothetical. Charles R. Knight (1909).
    †Mammuthus columbi
- Marmota
- †Megacerops
- †Megalictis
  - †Megalictis ferox
- †Meliosma
- †Meniscotherium
- †Menoceras
- †Menops
- †Mentoclaenodon
- Mergus
  - †Mergus merganser
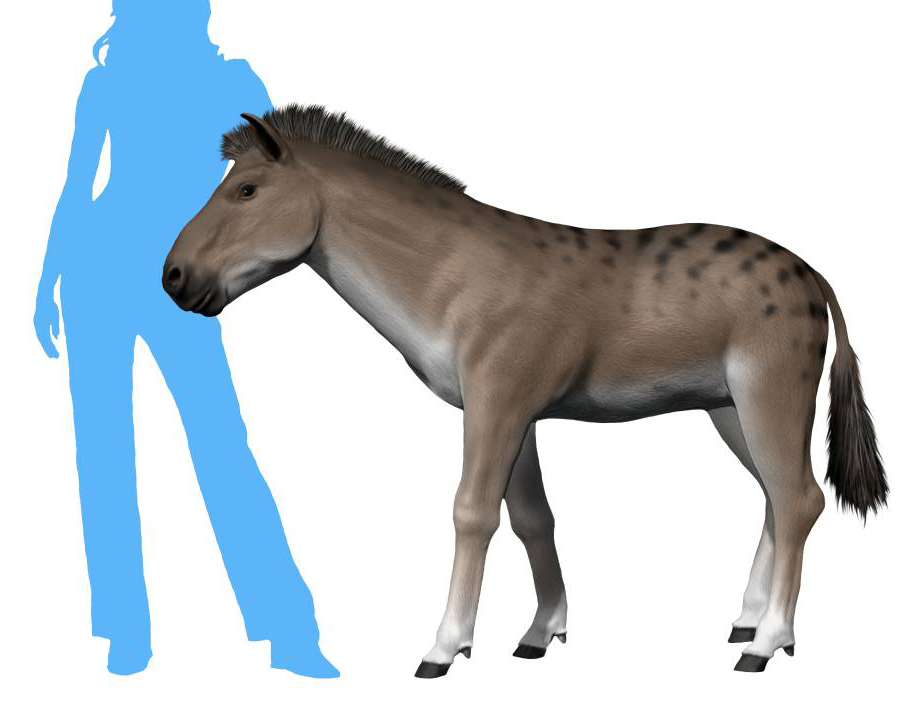
- Life restoration of the Miocene three-toed horse Merychippus
  †Merychippus
- †Merychyus
- †Merycochoerus
- †Merycodus
- †Merycoides
- †Merycoidodon
- †Mesatirhinus
- †Mesocyon – report made of unidentified related form or using admittedly obsolete nomenclature
- †Mesodma
  - †Mesodma formosa
  - †Mesodma garfieldensis – or unidentified comparable form
  - †Mesodma hensleighi
  - †Mesodma pygmaea
- †Mesohippus
- †Mesonyx
  - †Mesonyx obtusidens – type locality for species
- †Mesoreodon
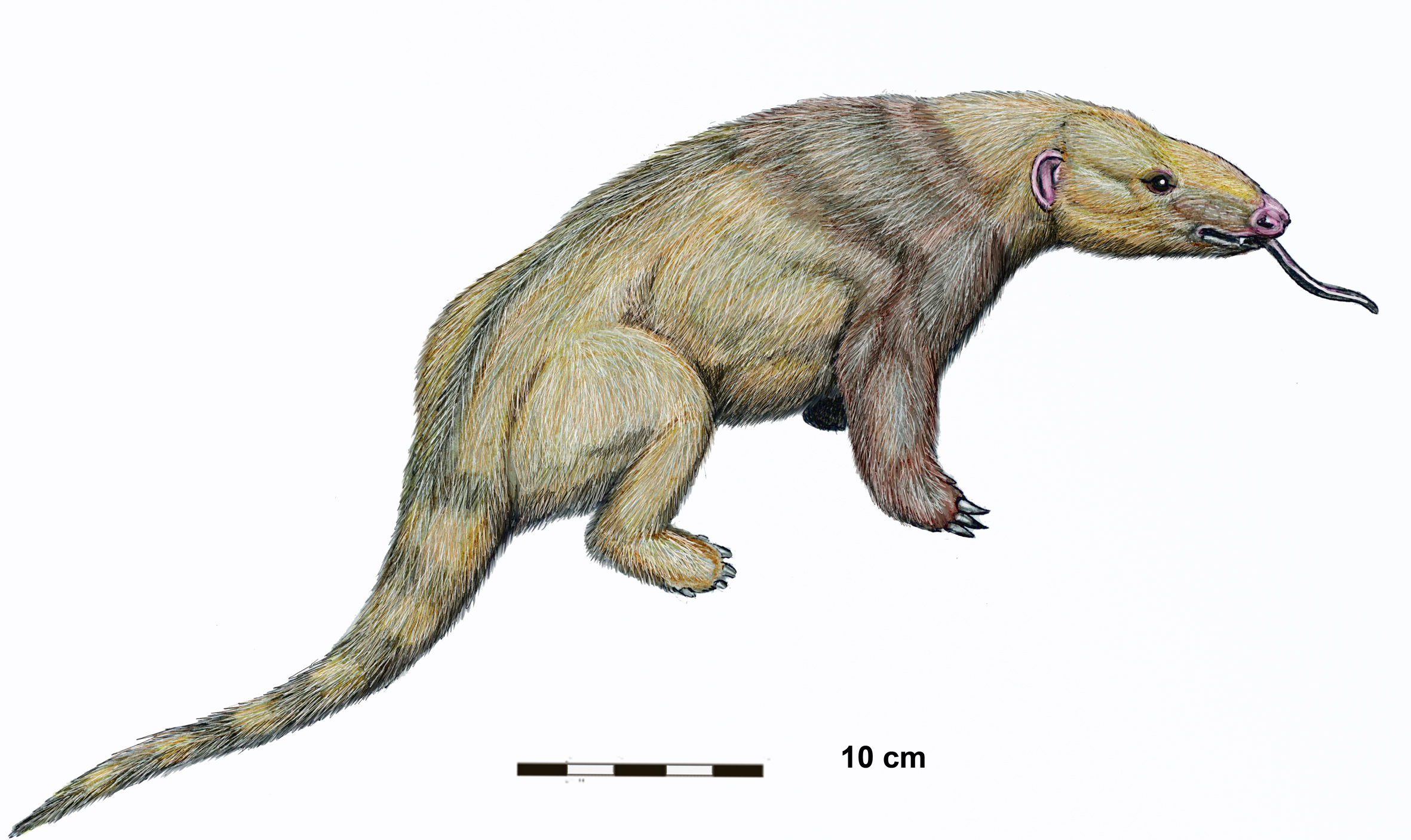
- Life restoration of the Eocene pangolin relative Metacheiromys
  †Metacheiromys
- †Metamynodon
  - †Metamynodon planifrons – or unidentified comparable form
- †Metarhinus
- Metasequoia
  - †Metasequoia occidentalis
- †Metatomarctus
- †Miacis
- †Michenia
- †Microcosmodon
  - †Microcosmodon conus – type locality for species
  - †Microcosmodon rosei – type locality for species
- Microphysula – or unidentified comparable form
- †Microsyops
- Microtus
  - †Microtus pennsylvanicus
- †Mimetodon
  - †Mimetodon churchilli – type locality for species
- †Mimoperadectes
  - †Mimoperadectes houdei – type locality for species
- †Miniochoerus
- †Miocyon
- †Miohippus
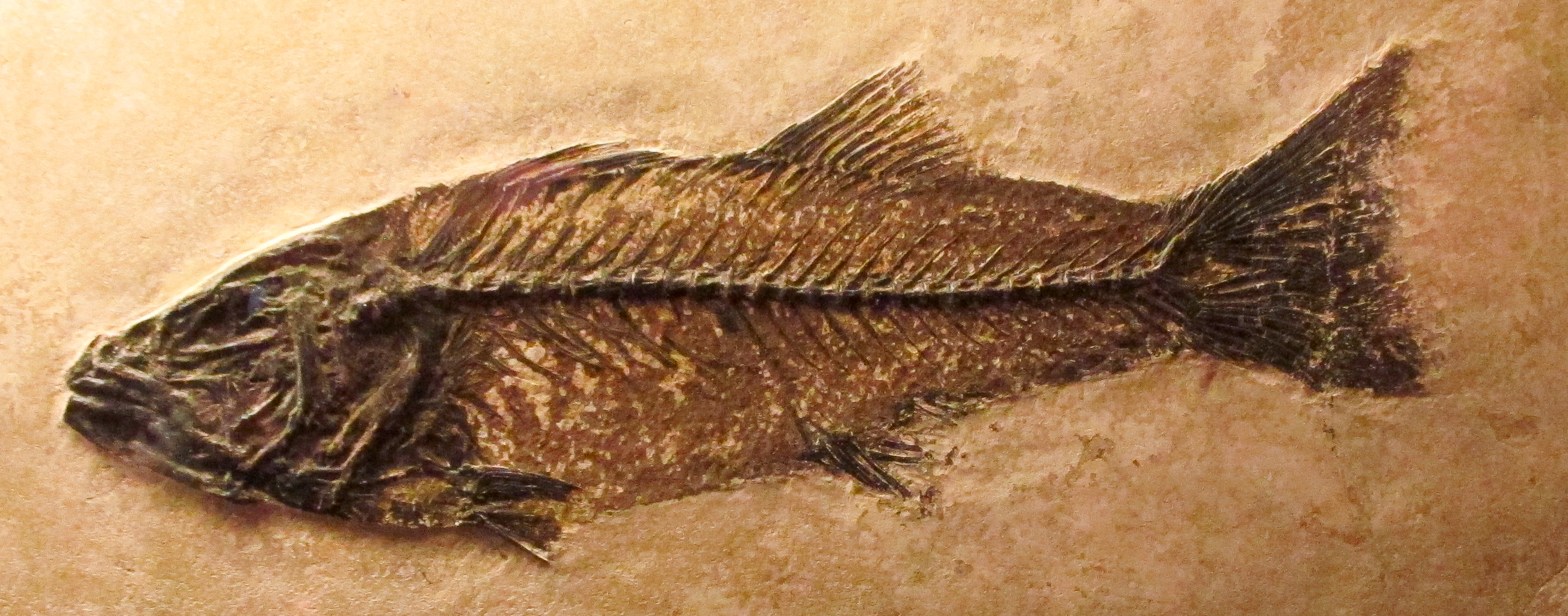
- Fossilized skeleton of the Eocene perch relative Mioplosus
  †Mioplosus
- †Miotapirus
  - †Miotapirus harrisonensis – type locality for species
- †Miotylopus
- †Miracinonyx
  - †Miracinonyx studeri
- †Mithrandir
- Mnemosyne
- †Monosaulax
- †Moropus
- Morus
- Mustela
  - †Mustela nigripes
- Myrica
- Myrmica
- †Nanotragulus
- †Neanis
- †Nelumbo
- †Neocathartes
  - †Neocathartes grallator
- †Neoliotomus
  - †Neoliotomus conventus
  - †Neoliotomus ultimus
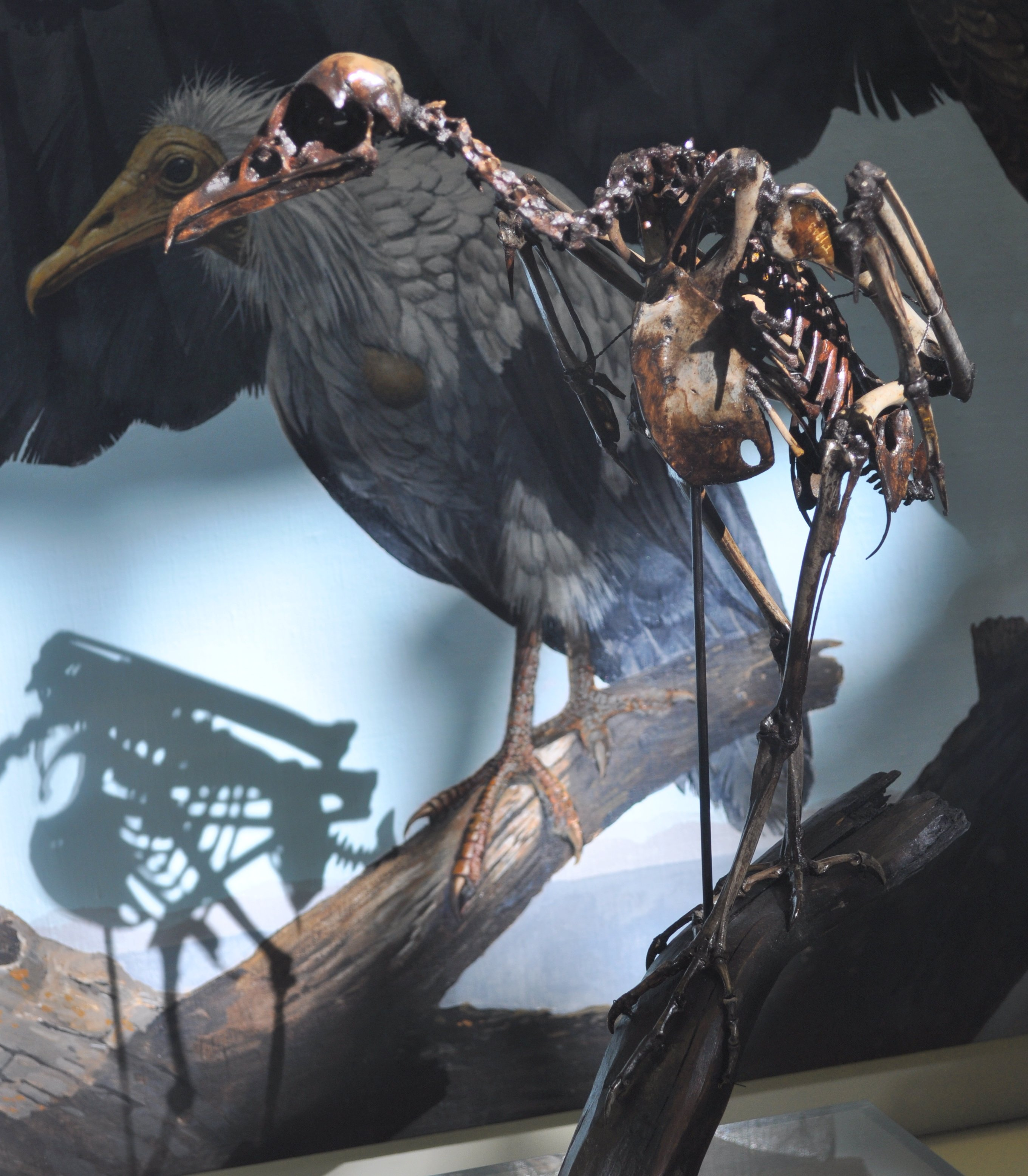
- Mounted fossilized skeleton of the Miocene Neophrontops
  Neophrontops
  - †Neophrontops americanus
- †Neoplagiaulax
  - †Neoplagiaulax grangeri – tentative report
  - †Neoplagiaulax hunteri
  - †Neoplagiaulax jepi – type locality for species
  - †Neoplagiaulax mckennai – type locality for species
  - †Neoplagiaulax nelsoni
- Neotoma
- †Nexuotapirus
- †Niglarodon
- †Notharctus
  - †Notharctus robustior
  - †Notharctus tenebrosus – type locality for species
  - †Notharctus venticolus
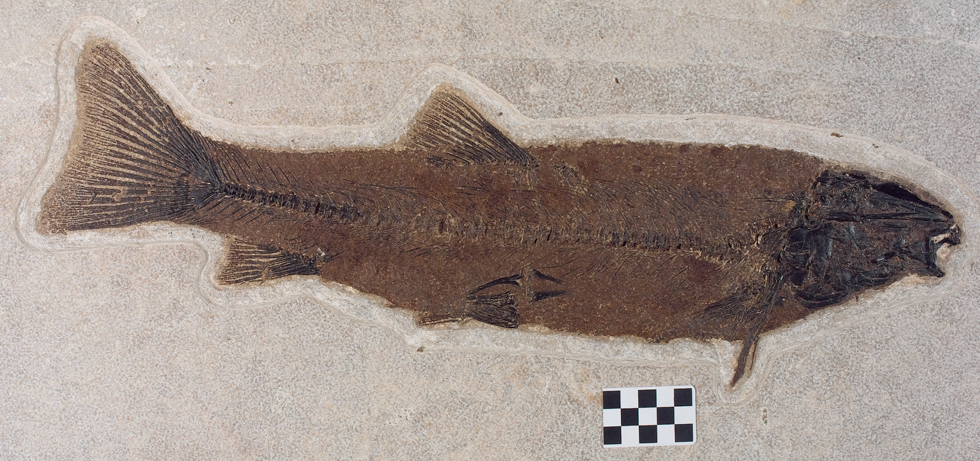
- Fossilized skeleton of the Late Cretaceous-Eocene beaked salmon relative Notogoneus
  †Notogoneus
- †Nototamias – or unidentified comparable form
- †Nucifraga
  - †Nucifraga columbiana
- Numenius
  - †Numenius americanus
  - †Numenius borealis
- †Nyctea
  - †Nyctea scandiaca
- †Nyssa
- Ochotona
  - †Ochotona princeps
- Ocotea
- †Odaxosaurus
  - †Odaxosaurus piger
- Ondatra
- †Onoclea
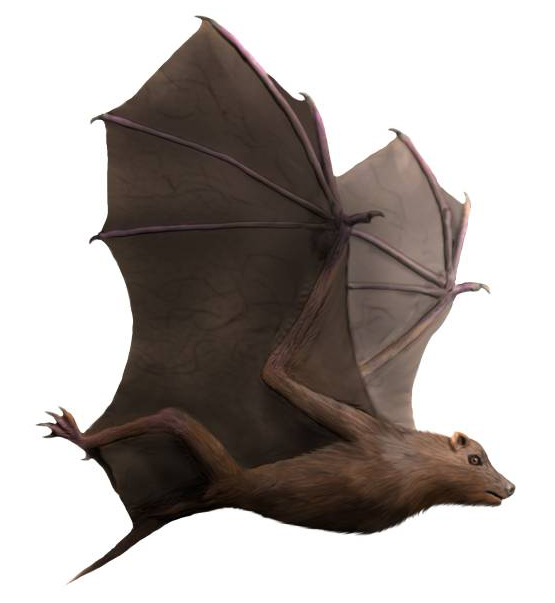
- Restoration of the Eocene bat Onychonycteris
  †Onychonycteris – type locality for genus
  - †Onychonycteris finneyi – type locality for species
- †Oodectes
- Ophryastes
- †Opisthotriton
- Oreamnos
- †Oreodontoides
- Oreohelix
- †Oreopanax
- †Ormiscus
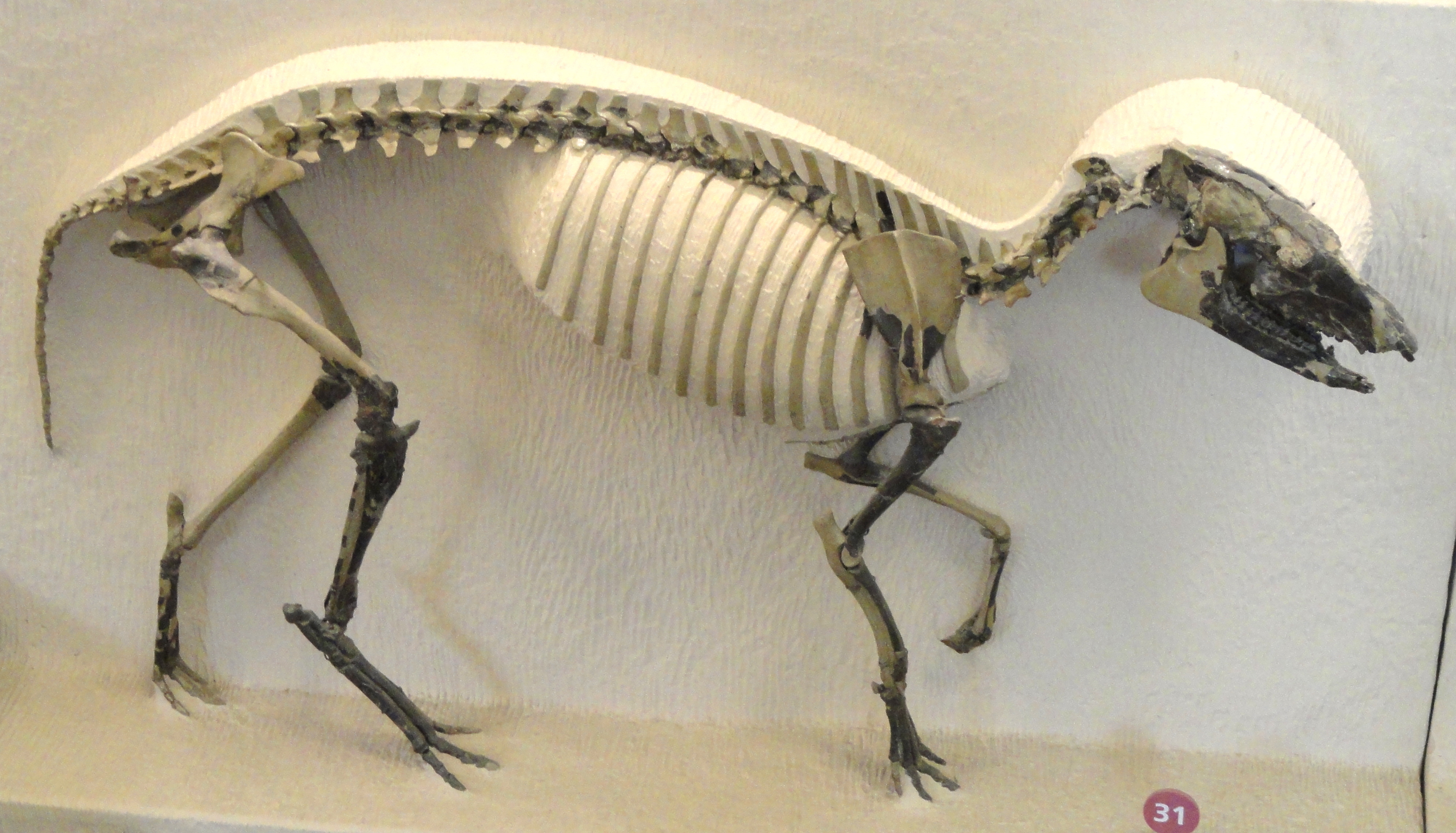
- Fossilized skeleton of the Eocene horse Orohippus
  †Orohippus
- †Orthogenysuchus – type locality for genus
  - †Orthogenysuchus olseni – type locality for species
- †Osbornodon
- †Osmanthus
- †Osmunda
- †Otarocyon
- †Otiorhynchus
- †Ototriton – type locality for genus
  - †Ototriton solidus – type locality for species
- Ovis
  - †Ovis canadensis
- †Oxyacodon
- †Oxyaena
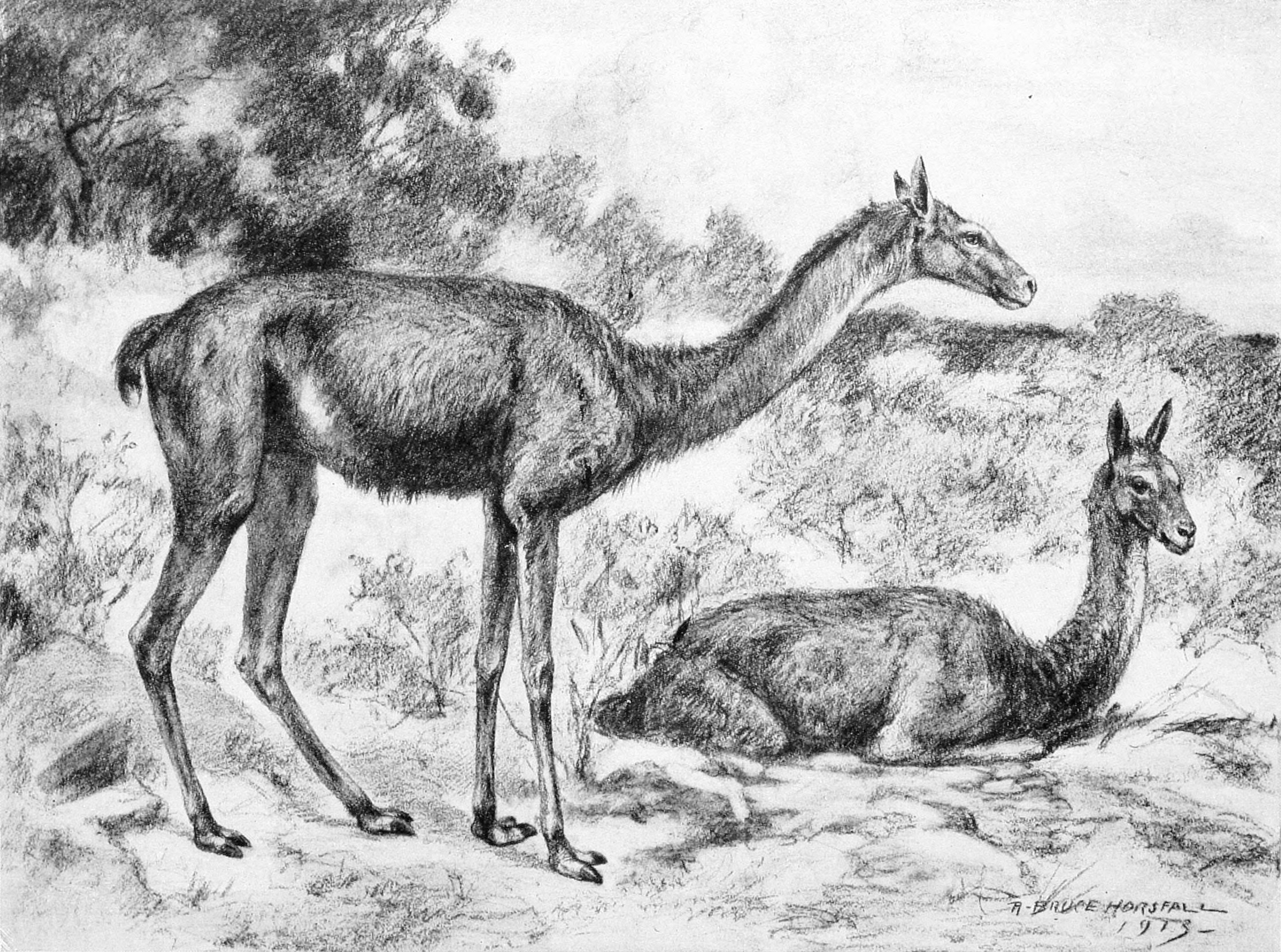
- Life restoration of a pair of the Oligocene-Miocene camel Oxydactylus. Robert Bruce Horsfall (1913).
  †Oxydactylus
- †Pachyaena
- Pachycondyla
- †Palaearctonyx
- †Palaeogale
- †Palaeolagus
- †Palaeonictis
- †Palaeoryctes
- †Palaeosinopa
- †Palaeosyops
- †Palatobaena – type locality for genus
- †Paleoamphiuma – type locality for genus
- Paliurus
- Panthera
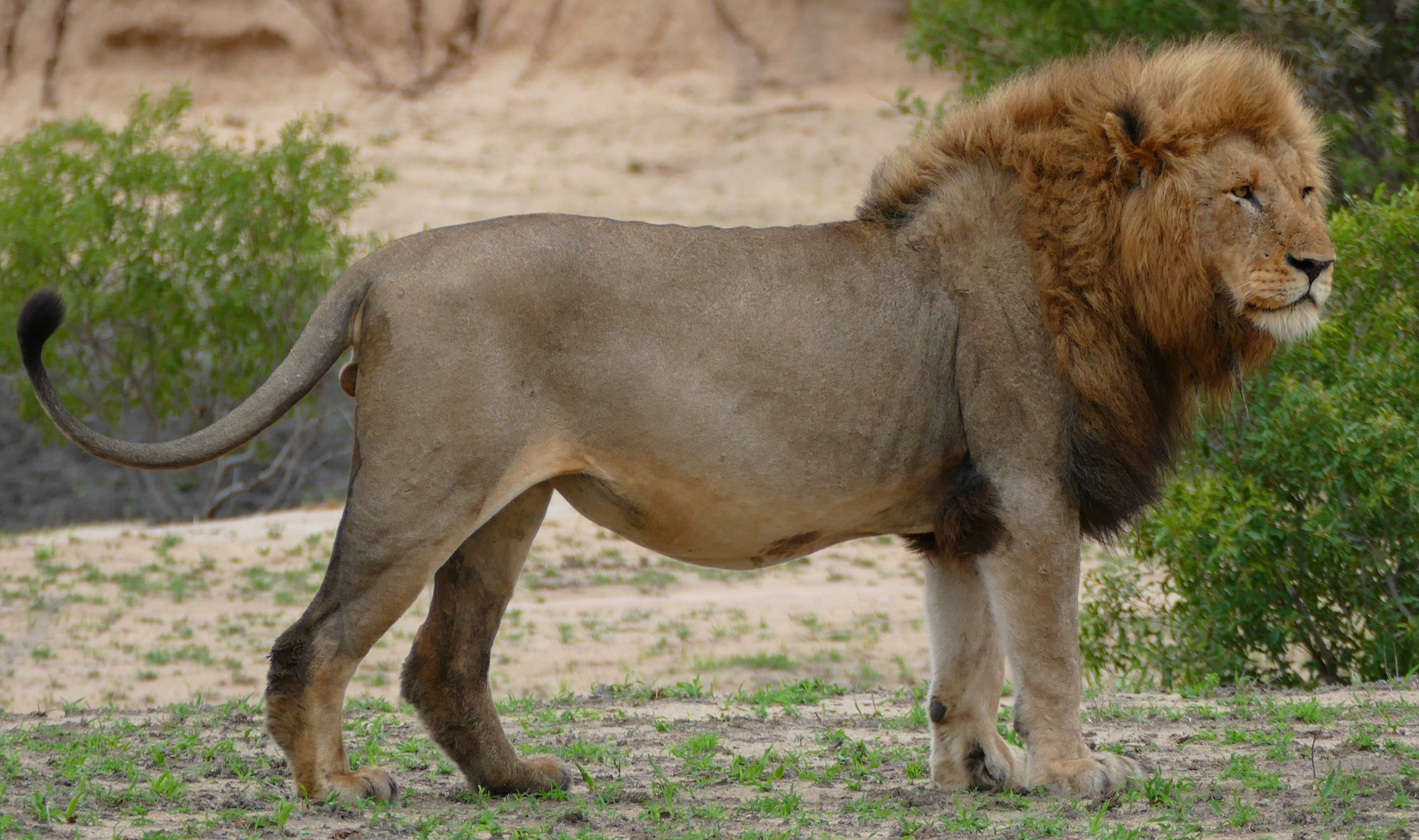
  - A living Panthera leo, or lion
    †Panthera leo
- †Pantolambda
- †Paracathartes
  - †Paracathartes howardae
- †Paracynarctus
- †Paraenhydrocyon
  - †Paraenhydrocyon josephi
- †Parahippus
- †Paramys
- †Parandrita
- †Paratomarctus
- †Paratylopus
- †Parectypodus
  - †Parectypodus lunatus
  - †Parectypodus sinclairi
  - †Parectypodus sylviae
- †Parictis
- †Parvitragulus
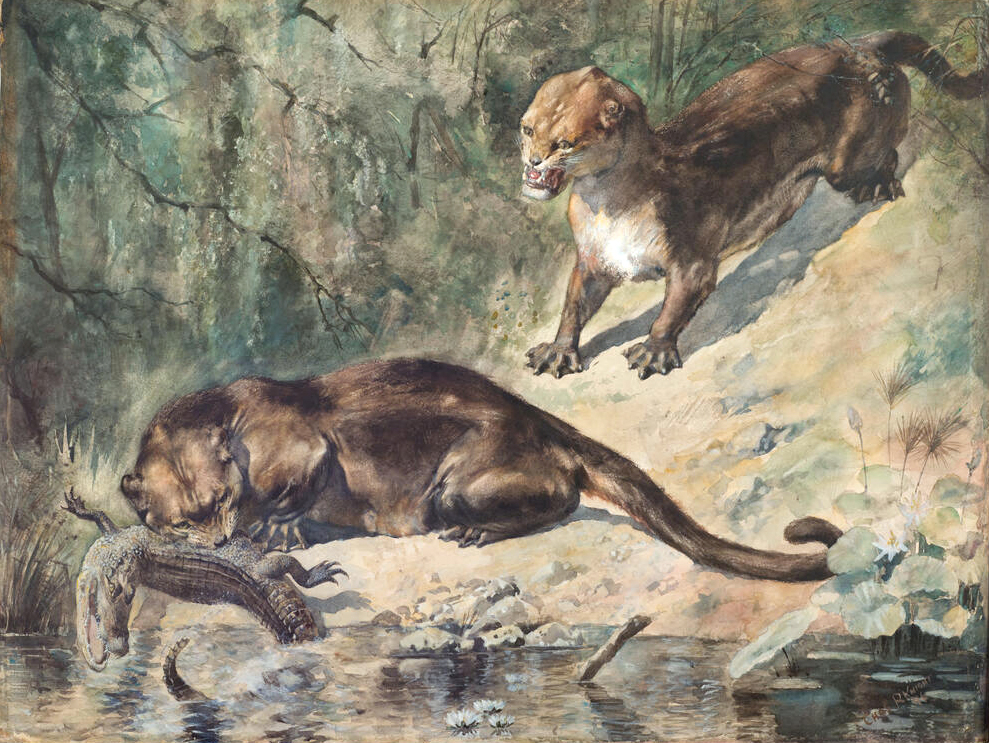
- Life restoration of the Eocene creodont mammal Patriofelis. Charles R. Knight (1896).
  †Patriofelis
  - †Patriofelis ferox – type locality for species
- †Patriomanis
- †Peltosaurus
- †Pelycodus
- †Pentacosmodon
  - †Pentacosmodon pronus – type locality for species
- †Peratherium
- Perognathus
- Peromyscus
- Persea
- †Phalaenoptilus
  - †Phalaenoptilus nuttallii
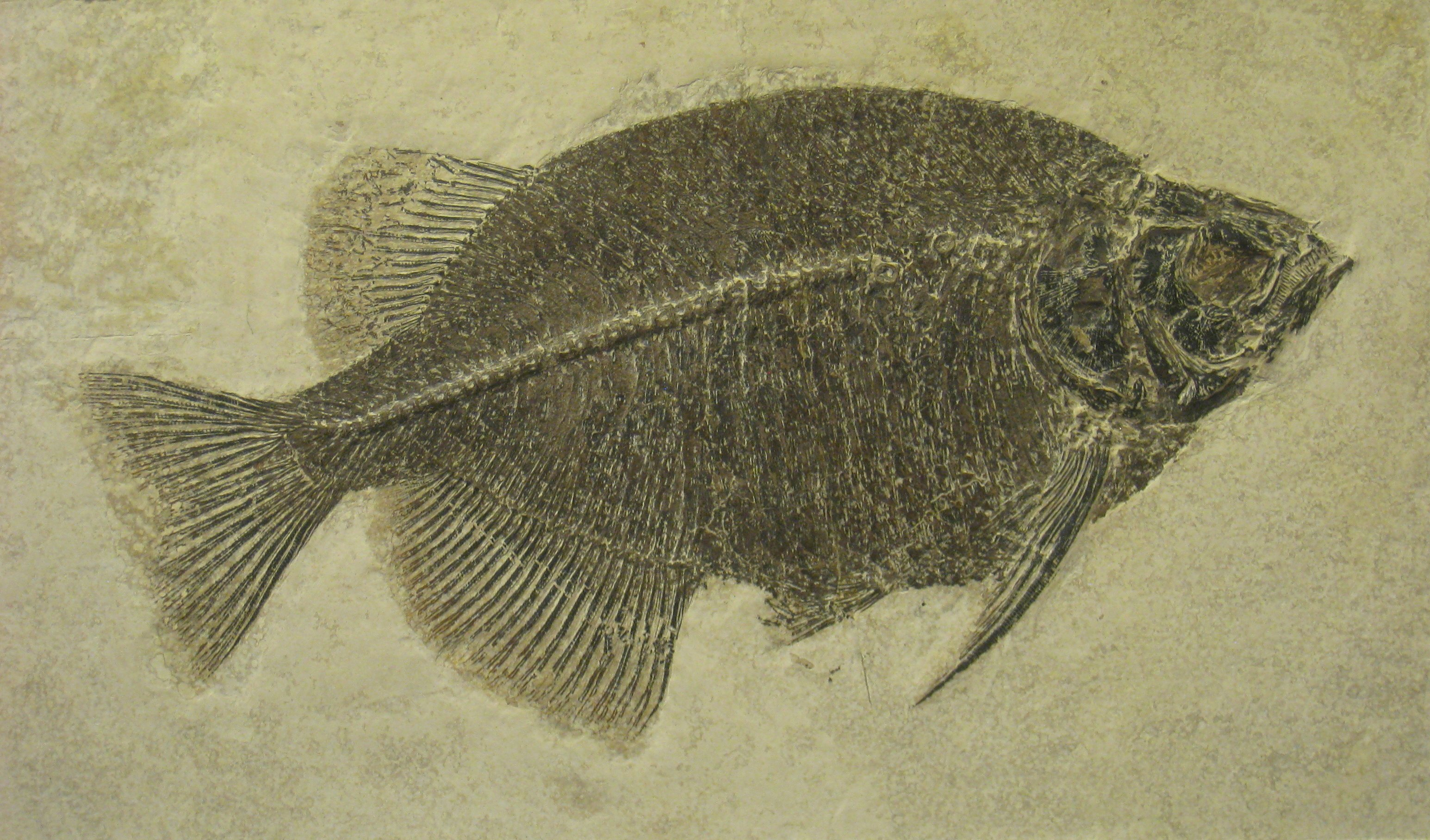
- Fossilized skeleton of the Paleocene-Eocene arowana relative Phareodus
  †Phareodus
  - †Phareodus encaustus
  - †Phareodus testis
- †Phenacocoelus
- †Phenacodontid
- †Phenacodus
- Phenacomys
- †Philodendron – or unidentified related form
- †Philotrox
  - †Philotrox condoni
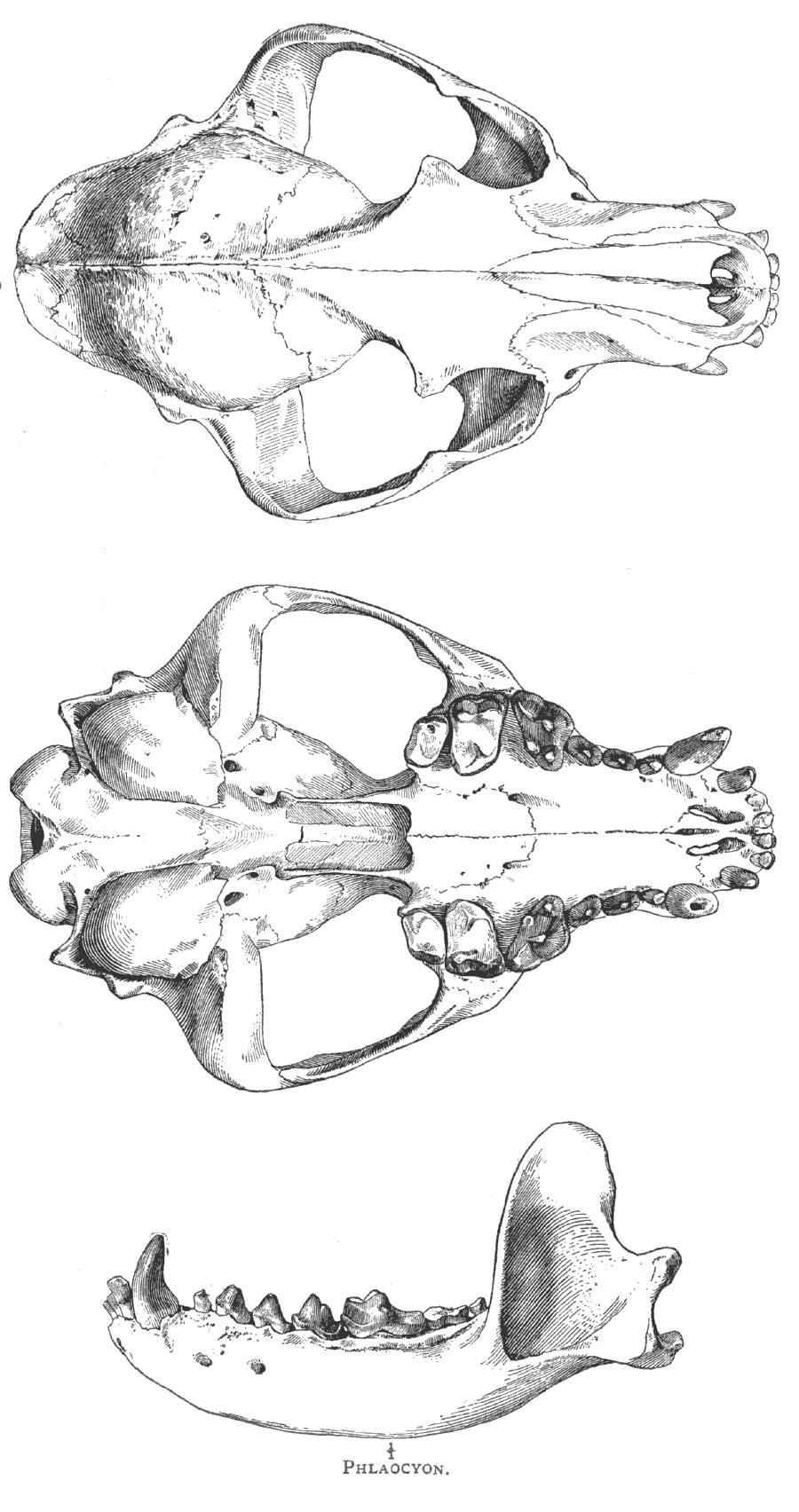
- Illustration of a fossilized skull in multiple views of the Oligocene-Miocene bone-crushing dog Phlaocyon
  †Phlaocyon
  - †Phlaocyon annectens
  - †Phlaocyon minor
- †Phoebe
- Phragmites – tentative report
- Phyllobius
- Physa
- Pica
  - †Pica pica
- †Piceoerpeton – type locality for genus
- Pinus
- Pipilo
  - †Pipilo chlorurus
- †Plagiomene
- †Planera
- †Planetetherium
  - †Planetetherium mirabile
- †Plastomenoides
- Platanus
- Platycarya
- Platynus
- Plecia
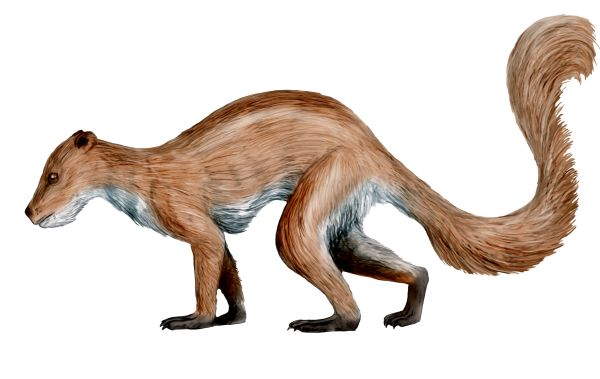
- Life restoration of the Paleocene-Eocene primate Plesiadapis
  †Plesiadapis
  - †Plesiadapis cookei
- †Poabromylus
- †Poebrodon
- †Poebrotherium
- Polygyra
- Populus
- Porzana
  - †Porzana carolina
- †Potamogeton
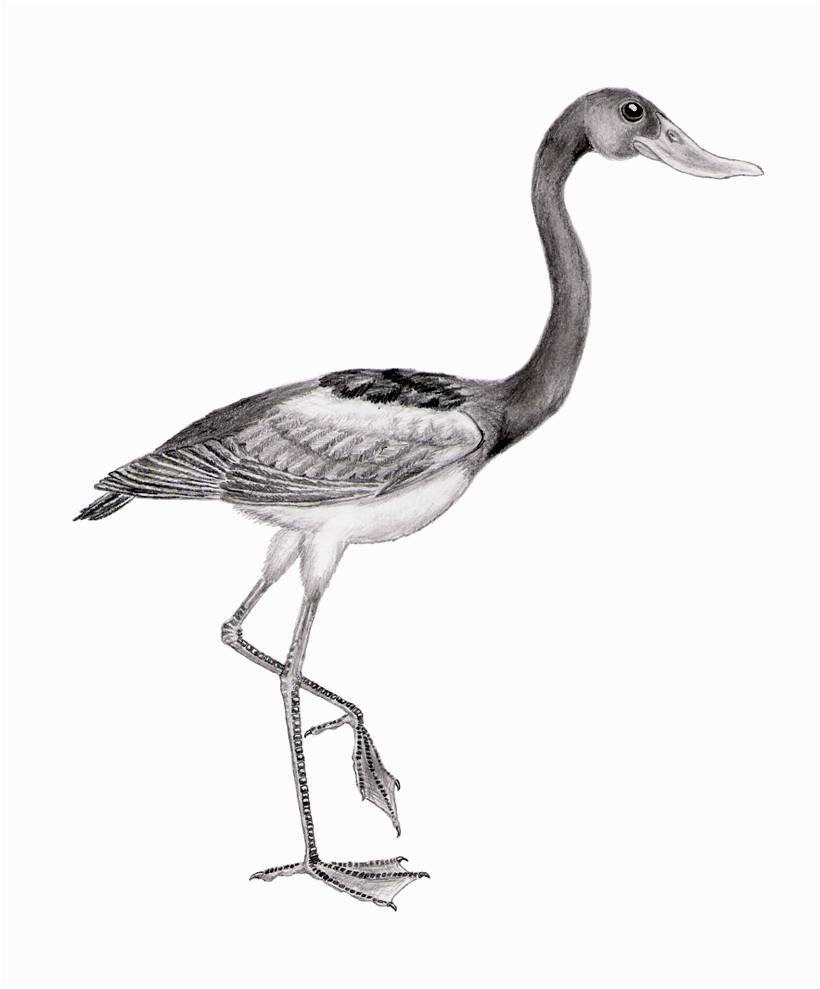
- Life restoration of the Paleocene-Eocene waterfowl Presbyornis
  †Presbyornis
- †Primobucco
- †Princetonia
- †Priscacara
- †Pristichampsus
- †Probathyopsis
- †Procaimanoidea
- †Procamelus
- †Prochetodon
  - †Prochetodon cavus – type locality for species
  - †Prochetodon foxi
  - †Prochetodon taxus – type locality for species
- †Procynodictis
- †Prolimnocyon
- †Promartes
- †Promerycochoerus
- †Proscalops
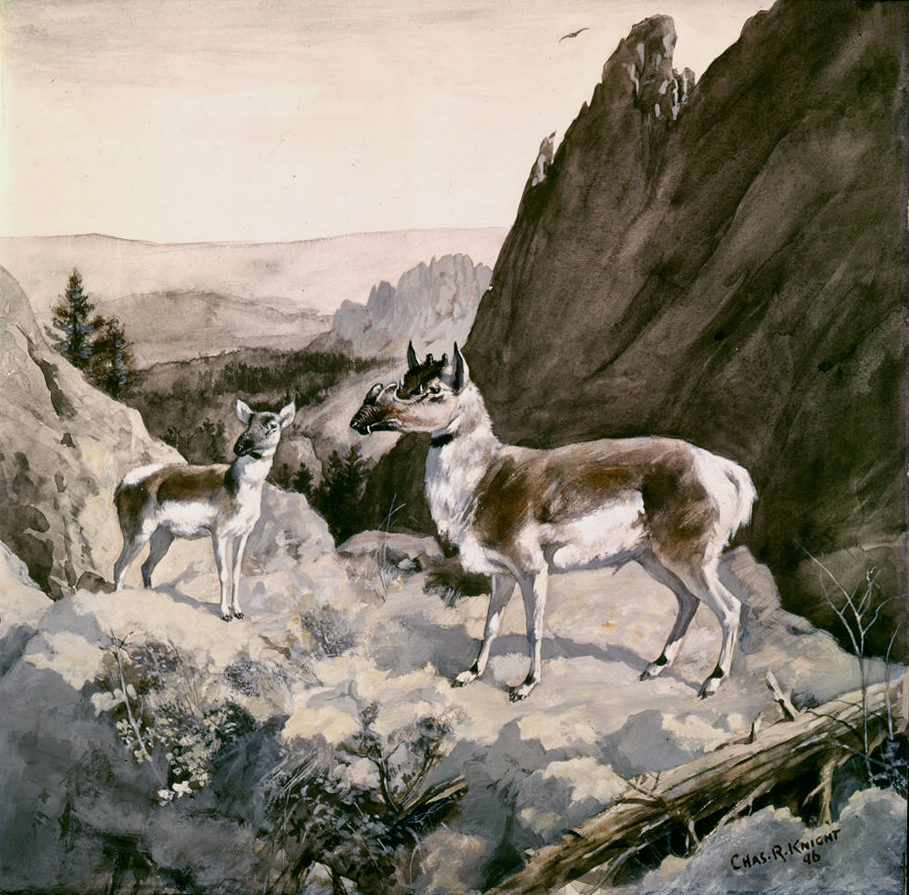
- Life restoration of a female (left) and male of the Oligocene-Miocene even-toed ungulate Protoceras. Charles R. Knight (1896).
  †Protoceras
- †Protochelydra
  - †Protochelydra zangerli – or unidentified comparable form
- †Protohippus
- †Protolabis
- †Protomarctus
- †Protorohippus
- †Protostrix
- †Protungulatum
  - †Protungulatum donnae
- †Protylopus
- Prunus
- †Pseudaelurus
- †Pseudhipparion
- †Pseudocrypturus – type locality for genus
  - †Pseudocrypturus cercanaxius – type locality for species
- †Pseudolabis
- †Pseudoprotoceras
- †Psilota
- †Psittacotherium
- Ptelea
- Pteris – or unidentified related form
- Pterocarya
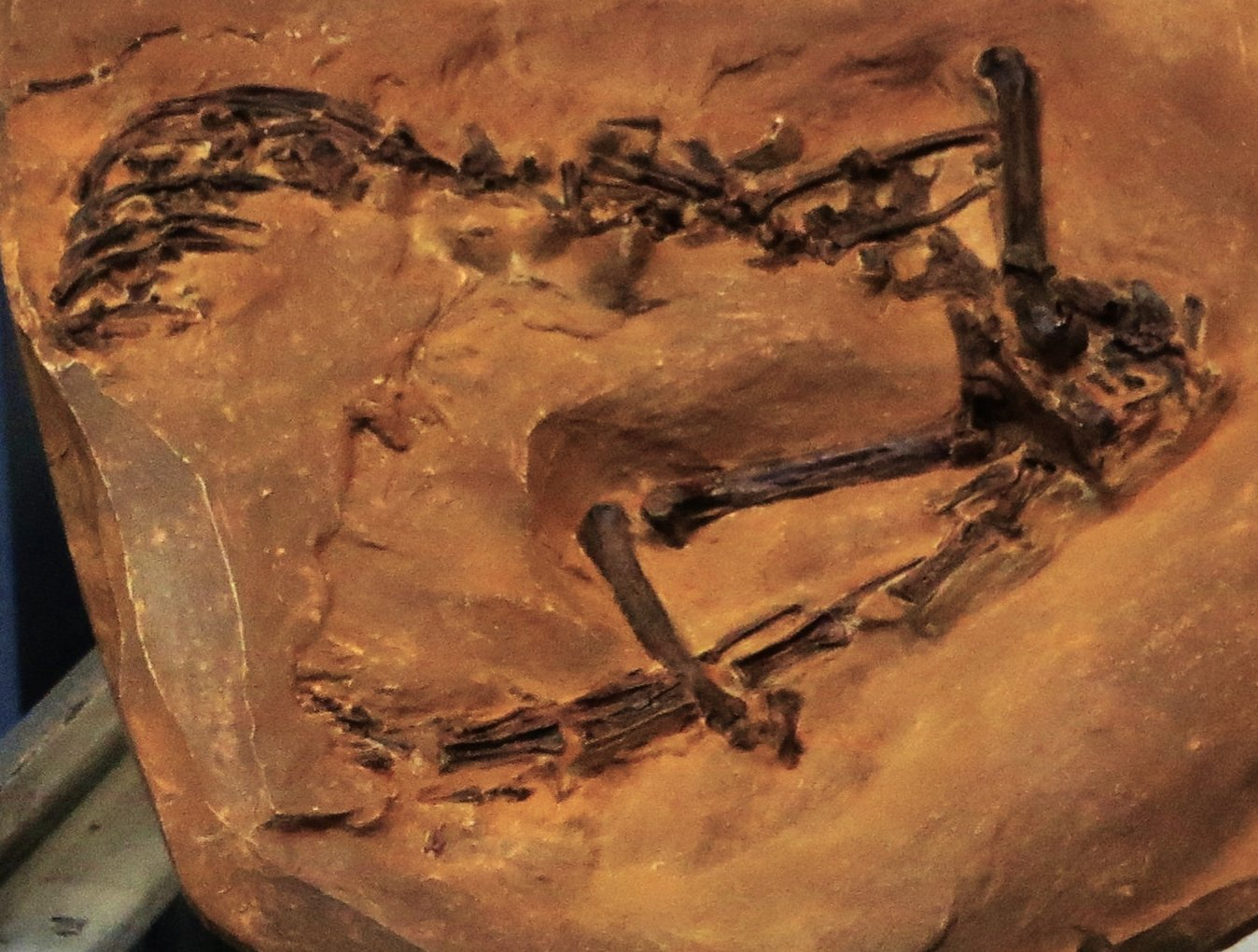
- Fossilized skeleton of the Paleocene multituberculate mammal Ptilodus
  †Ptilodus
  - †Ptilodus fractus
  - †Ptilodus gnomus
  - †Ptilodus kummae
  - †Ptilodus mediaevus
  - †Ptilodus montanus – or unidentified comparable form
  - †Ptilodus tsosiensis – or unidentified comparable form
  - †Ptilodus wyomingensis – type locality for species
- Puma
  - †Puma concolor
- Pupilla – or unidentified comparable form
- †Pyramidula
- †Pyrocyon
- Quercus
- Quiscalus – or unidentified comparable form
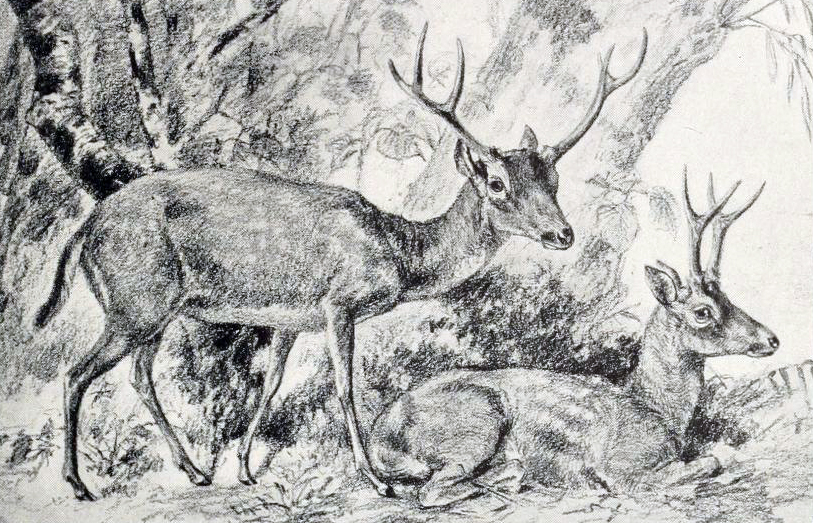
- Life restoration of the Miocene-Pliocene pronghorn Ramoceros and Cosoryx. Robert Bruce Horsfall (1913).
  †Ramoceros
- †Raphictis
- †Rhamnus
- Rhineura – type locality for genus
- Rhinoclemmys – report made of unidentified related form or using admittedly obsolete nomenclature
- Rhus
- †Rhyssa
- †Robinia
- Rosa
- Sabal
- †Saccoloma
- Salix
- †Salpinctes – or unidentified comparable form
  - †Salpinctes obsoletus
- †Salvinia
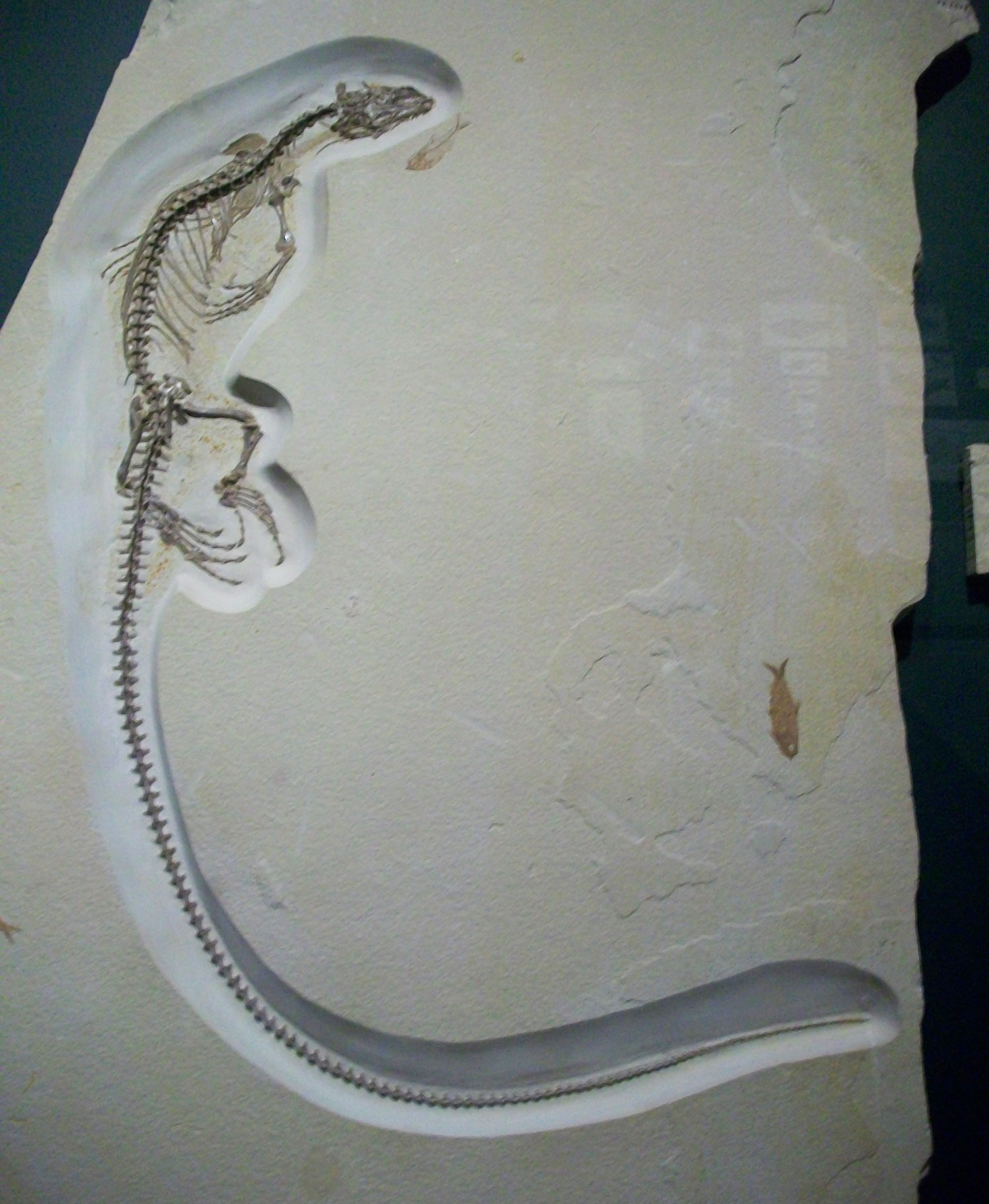
- Fossilized skeleton of the Eocene monitor lizard Saniwa
  †Saniwa – type locality for genus
  - †Saniwa ensidens – type locality for species
- †Sapindus
- Sassafras
- †Scapherpeton
- †Schoepfia
- Sciara
- †Sciophila
- Sequoia
- †Sespia
- †Shoshonius
  - †Shoshonius bowni
  - †Shoshonius cooperi
- †Sialia
- †Sifrhippus
- †Simoedosaurus
- †Sinomenium – or unidentified related form
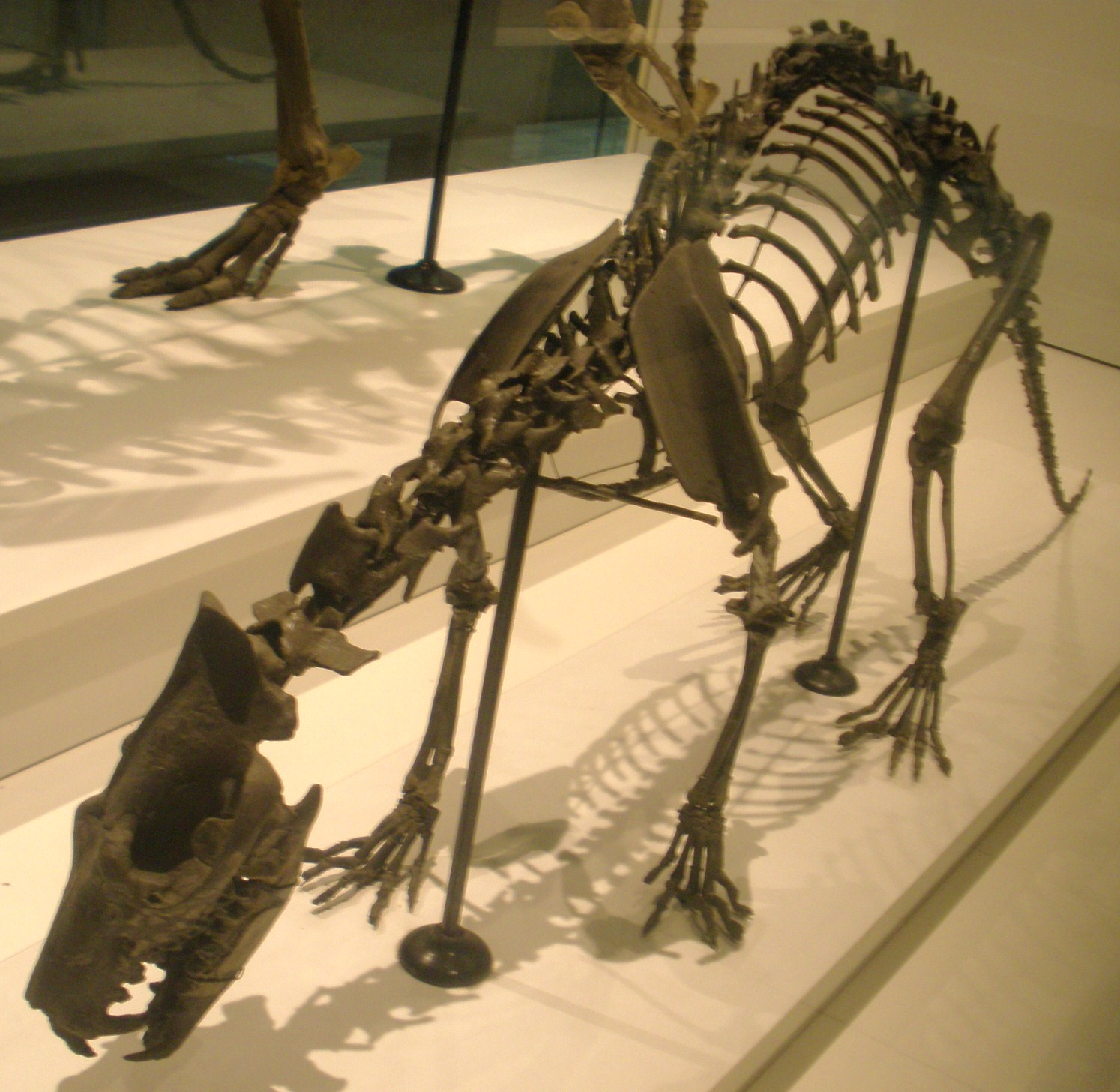
- Fossilized skeleton of the Eocene-Oligocene creodont mammal Sinopa
  †Sinopa
- Siren
  - †Siren dunni – type locality for species
- Sitona
- Sloanea – or unidentified related form
- †Smilax
- †Smilodectes
  - †Smilodectes gracilis – type locality for species
  - †Smilodectes mcgrewi – type locality for species
- Sorex
  - †Sorex hoyi
- †Sparganium
- †Spathorhynchus – type locality for genus
  - †Spathorhynchus fossorium – type locality for species
  - †Spathorhynchus natronicus
- Spermophilus
  - †Spermophilus variegatus
- †Sphenocoelus
- Spirodela
- †Spiza
  - †Spiza americana
- Stagnicola
- †Stegobium
- †Steneofiber
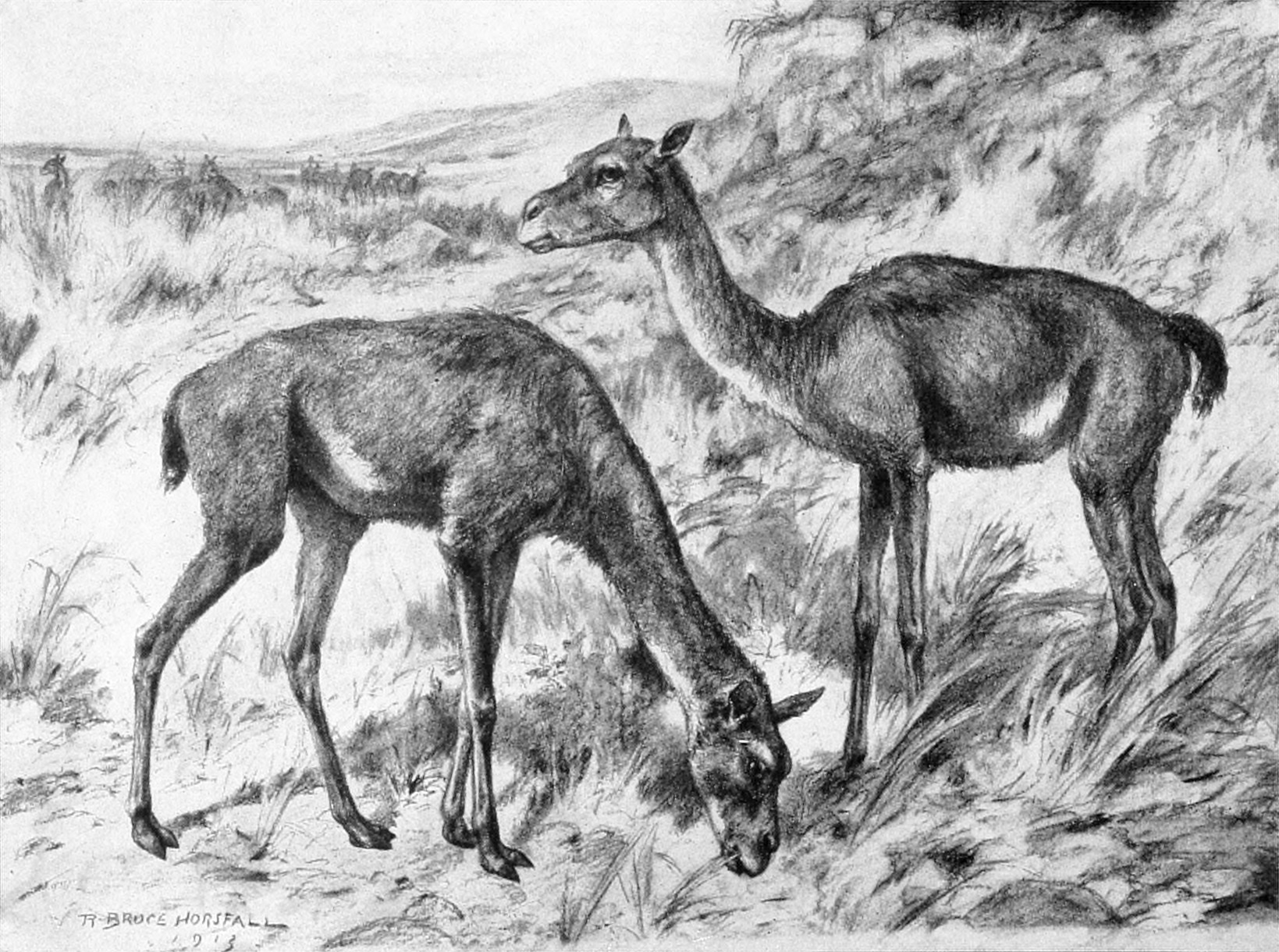
- Life restoration of the Oligocene-Miocene camel Stenomylus
  †Stenomylus
  - †Stenomylus gracilis
  - †Stenomylus hitchcocki
  - †Stenomylus keelinensis
- Sterculia
- †Stillingia
- Sturnella
  - †Sturnella neglecta
- †Stygimys
  - †Stygimys kuszmauli
- †Stylemys
- †Stylinodon
- †Styrax
- †Subhyracodon
- Surnia
  - †Surnia ulula
- †Suzanniwana – type locality for genus
  - †Suzanniwana patriciana – type locality for species
  - †Suzanniwana revenanta – type locality for species
- †Swartzia
- Sylvilagus
- Symplocos
- Synaptomys
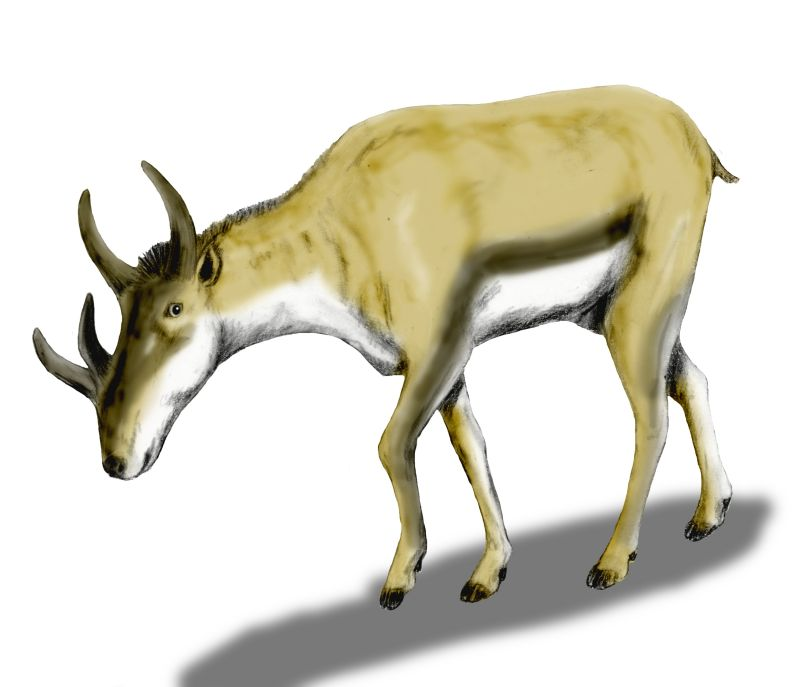
- Life restoration of the Miocene protoceratid mammal Syndyoceras
  †Syndyoceras
  - †Syndyoceras cooki
- Syrphus
- Tachycineta – or unidentified comparable form
  - †Tachycineta bicolor
- †Taeniolabis
  - †Taeniolabis taoensis
- Tamias
- †Tanymykter
- †Tapocyon
- †Tarka
- Taxidea
  - †Taxidea taxus
- Taxodium
- †Taxonus
- †Teilhardina
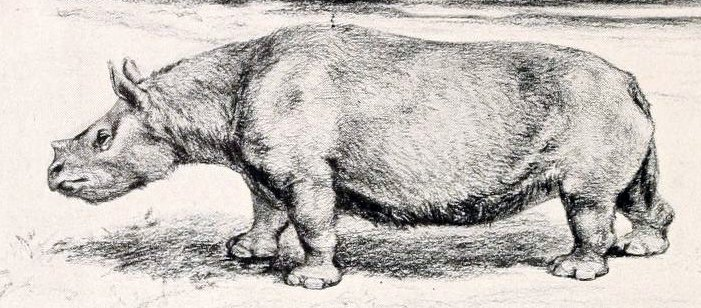
- Restoration of the Miocene-Pliocene rhinoceros Teleoceras
  †Teleoceras
- †Telmatherium
- †Temnocyon
- †Tetraclaenodon
- Thelypteris
- †Thouinia
- †Thuja
- Tilia
- Tipula
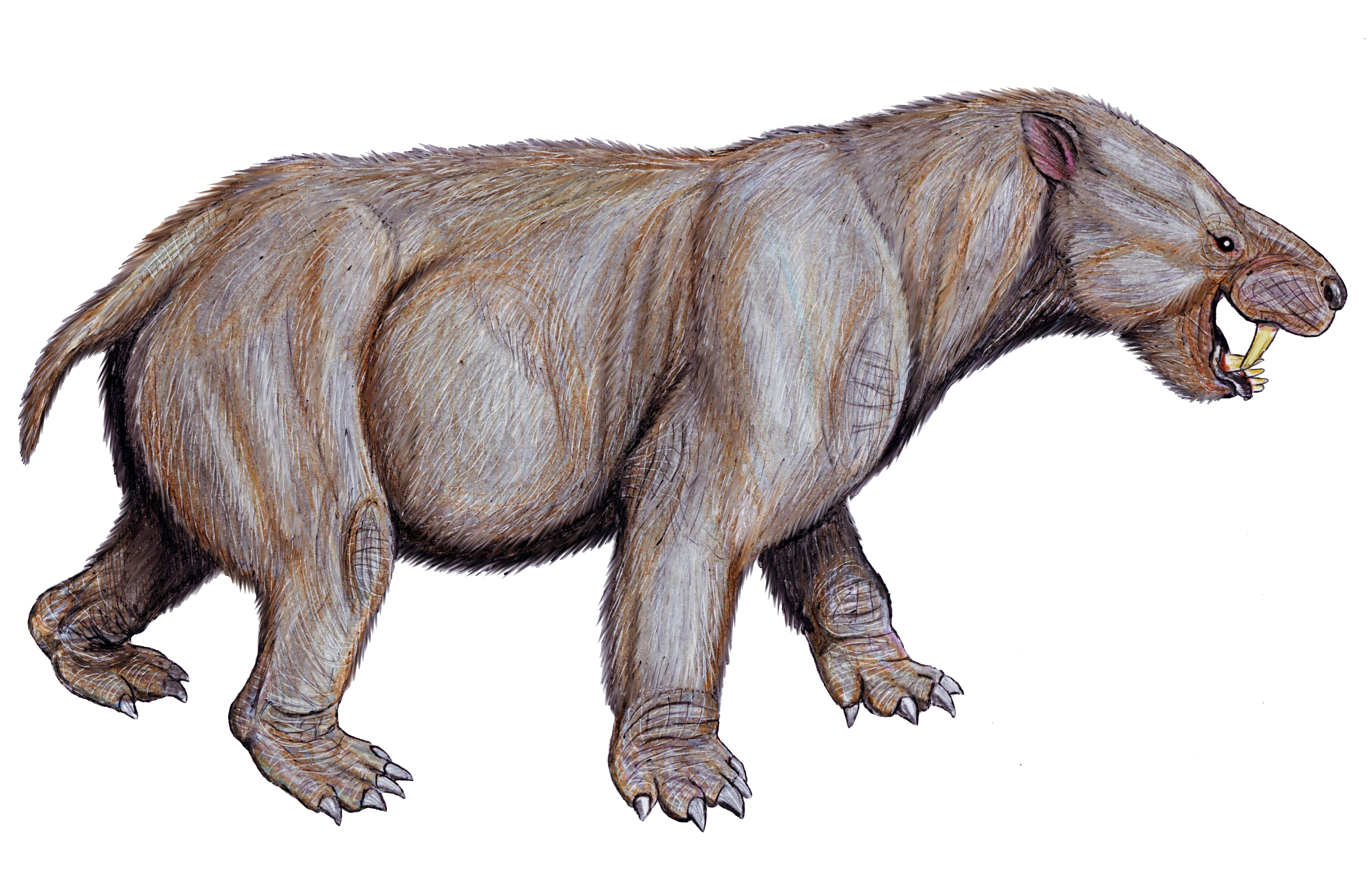
- Life restoration of the Paleocene pantodont mammal Titanoides
  †Titanoides
  - †Titanoides gidleyi – type locality for species
  - †Titanoides major
  - †Titanoides nanus – type locality for species
  - †Titanoides primaevus
- †Titanomyrma
  - †Titanomyrma lubei – type locality for species
- †Trapa
- †Trigenicus
- †Trigonias
- Trionyx
- †Tritemnodon
- †Tritoma
- †Triumfetta
- †Trogosus
- †Tropisternus
- †Trypodendron
- †Tsoabichi – type locality for genus
  - †Tsoabichi greenriverensis – type locality for species
- Turdus – or unidentified comparable form
  - †Turdus migratorius
- †Tylocephalonyx
- Tympanuchus
  - †Tympanuchus phasianellus
- Typha – or unidentified related form
- †Tytthaena
- †Uintacyon
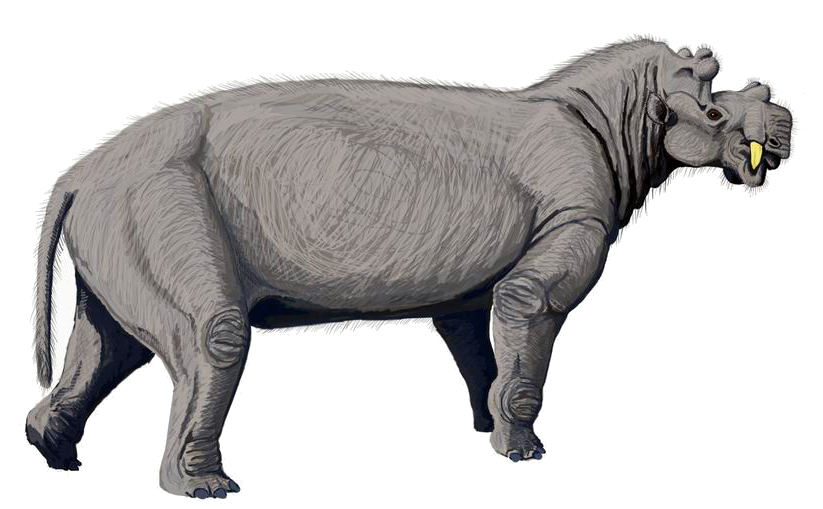
- Life restoration of the Eocene mammal Uintatherium
  †Uintatherium – type locality for genus
  - †Uintatherium anceps – type locality for species
- Ulmus
- Unio
- Ursus
  - †Ursus arctos
- †Ustatochoerus
- †Valenia
- †Valenopsalis
- †Vassacyon
- †Vauquelinia
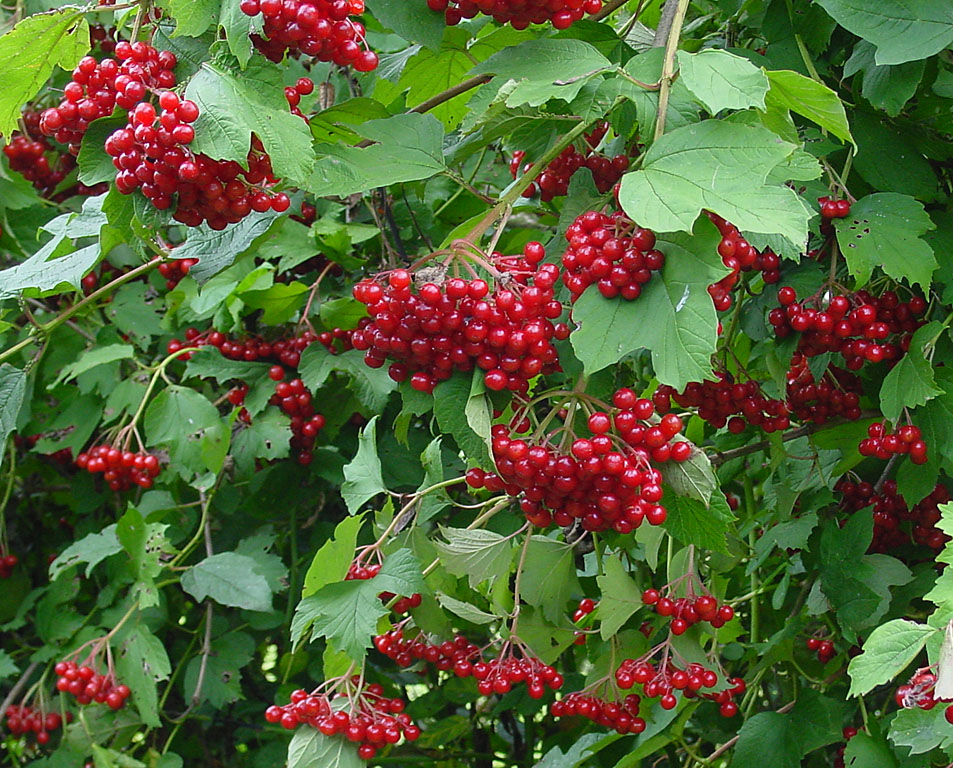
- Leaves and fruit of a living Viburnum.
  †Viburnum
- †Vinea – or unidentified comparable form
- Vitis
- †Viverravus
- Viviparus
- †Vulpavus
- Vulpes
  - †Vulpes vulpes
- †Woodwardia
- †Xanclomys
  - †Xanclomys mcgrewi – type locality for species
- †Xyronomys
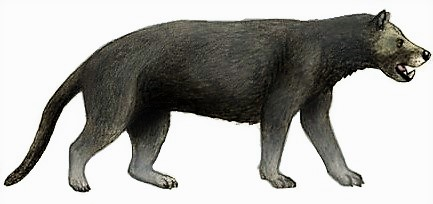
- Life restoration of the Miocene bear dog Ysengrinia
  †Ysengrinia
- †Zamia
- Zelkova
- Zenaida
- Zizyphus
- †Zodiolestes
- Zonotrichia
  - †Zonotrichia albicollis
