= List of the Paleozoic life of Wyoming =

This list of the Paleozoic life of Wyoming contains the various prehistoric life-forms whose fossilized remains have been reported from within the US state of Wyoming and are between 538.8 and 252.17 million years of age.

== A ==
- †Acanthopecten
  - †Acanthopecten alatus
  - †Acanthopecten coloradoensis
  - †Acanthopecten delawarensis – or unidentified comparable form
- †Acanthoscorpio – type locality for genus
  - †Acanthoscorpio mucronatus – type locality for species
- †Acanthracospirifer
  - †Acanthracospirifer occiduus – tentative report
  - †Acanthracospirifer shawi
- †Acondylacanthus
  - †Acondylacanthus browni – type locality for species
- †Acontiodus
- †Acratia – tentative report
  - †Acratia disjuncta
- †Actinoceras
- †Actinocoelia
  - †Actinocoelia maeandrina
- †Acuticarpus
  - †Acuticarpus delticus
  - †Acuticarpus republicensis – type locality for species
- †Adetognathodus
  - †Adetognathodus gigantea – or unidentified comparable form
- †Agassizodus
  - †Agassizodus variabilis
- †Agnostogonus
  - †Agnostogonus incognitus – or unidentified comparable form
- †Allocryptaspis
  - †Allocryptaspis ellipticus
  - †Allocryptaspis flabelliformis
- †Allumettoceras
- †Alokistocare
- †Amphiscapha
  - †Amphiscapha calix – type locality for species
- †Amphissites
  - †Amphissites robertsi
- †Amplexus
- †Ananias
  - †Ananias nevadensis – or unidentified related form
- †Anarthraspis
  - †Anarthraspis chamberlini
  - †Anarthraspis montanus
- †Ancistriodus
  - †Ancistriodus multisectus
- †Anematina
- †Angulotreta
- †Anidanthus
- †Ankoura
- †Anthracospirifer
  - †Anthracospirifer curvilateralis
  - †Anthracospirifer occidus
  - †Anthracospirifer occiduus
  - †Anthracospirifer rawlinsensis
  - †Anthracospirifer shawi
  - †Anthracospirifer welleri
- †Antiquatonia
  - †Antiquatonia coloradoensis – or unidentified comparable form
  - †Antiquatonia sulcatus – or unidentified comparable form
- †Antracospirifer
  - †Antracospirifer occidus
  - †Antracospirifer rawlinsensis
  - †Antracospirifer shawi
  - †Antracospirifer welleri
- †Apachella
  - †Apachella boydi – type locality for species
  - †Apachella capertoni
  - †Apachella franciscana
  - †Apachella pseudostrigillata
  - †Apachella turbiniformis
- †Aphanaia
  - †Aphanaia erectum – type locality for species
- †Aphelaspis
  - †Aphelaspis walcotti
- †Apiculatisporites
  - †Apiculatisporites microconus
- †Apiculiretusispora
  - †Apiculiretusispora plicata
  - †Apiculiretusispora spicula
- †Arapahoia
- †Archaediscus
  - †Archaediscus krestovnikovi – or unidentified loosely related form
- †Archaeocidaris
- †Arctacanthus
  - †Arctacanthus wyomingensis – type locality for species
- †Asphaltina
- †Astartella
  - †Astartella aueri – type locality for species
  - †Astartella concentrica
- †Asteroarchaediscus
  - †Asteroarchaediscus bachkiricus
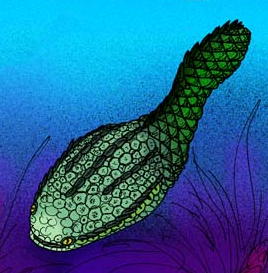
- Life restoration of the Middle-Late Ordovician jawless fish Astraspis
  †Astraspis
  - †Astraspis desiderata
- †Aviculopecten
  - †Aviculopecten basilicus – or unidentified comparable form
  - †Aviculopecten girtyi
  - †Aviculopecten gravidus
  - †Aviculopecten gryphus
  - †Aviculopecten kaibabensis – or unidentified comparable form
- †Aviculopinna

== B ==
- †Babylonites
- Bairdia
  - †Bairdia contracta
  - †Bairdia delicata
  - †Bairdia nasuta
- †Bakevellia – tentative report
- †Balantoides
  - †Balantoides quadrilobatus
- †Baltagnostus
  - †Baltagnostus wyomingensis – type locality for species
- †Barytichisma
  - †Barytichisma amsdenense
- †Batacanthus
  - †Batacanthus gigas – type locality for species
- †Bathymyonia
  - †Bathymyonia nevadensis
- †Batostoma
- †Bayfieldia
  - †Bayfieldia bindosa
  - †Bayfieldia simata – or unidentified comparable form
- †Baylea
  - †Baylea delawarensis
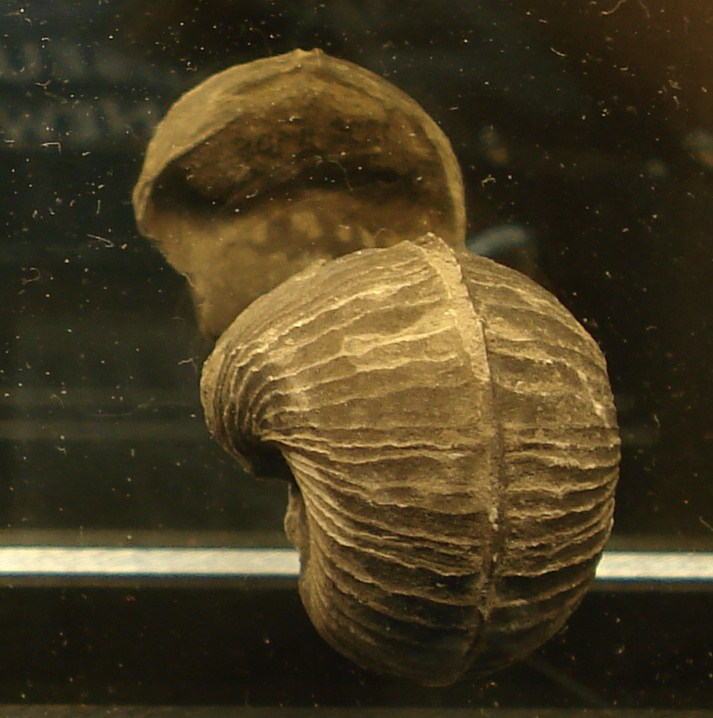
- Fossilized shell of the Silurian-Early Triassic mollusc Bellerophon
  †Bellerophon
  - †Bellerophon deflectus – or unidentified comparable form
- †Belodus
- †Bighornia
  - †Bighornia parva
  - †Bighornia patella
- †Billingsella
  - †Billingsella perfecta
- †Biseriella
  - †Biseriella moderata
  - †Biseriella parva
- †Blountia
  - †Blountia cora
  - †Blountia janei
- †Blountiella
  - †Blountiella alberta
- †Bolaspidella
- †Borestus
- †Bowmania
  - †Bowmania pennsylvania
- †Brachythyrina
  - †Brachythyrina washakiensis
- †Bradyina – tentative report
- †Branchioscorpio – type locality for genus
  - †Branchioscorpio richardsoni – type locality for species
- †Briscoia
- †Broeggeria – tentative report
  - †Broeggeria strobiliformis
- †Broggeria – tentative report
  - †Broggeria strobiliformis – type locality for species
- †Bryantodina
- †Bryantolepis
  - †Bryantolepis brachycephalus
  - †Bryantolepis cristatus
  - †Bryantolepis major
  - †Bryantolepis obscurus
- †Bucheria – type locality for genus
  - †Bucheria ovata – type locality for species
- †Bulbocanthus
  - †Bulbocanthus rugosus
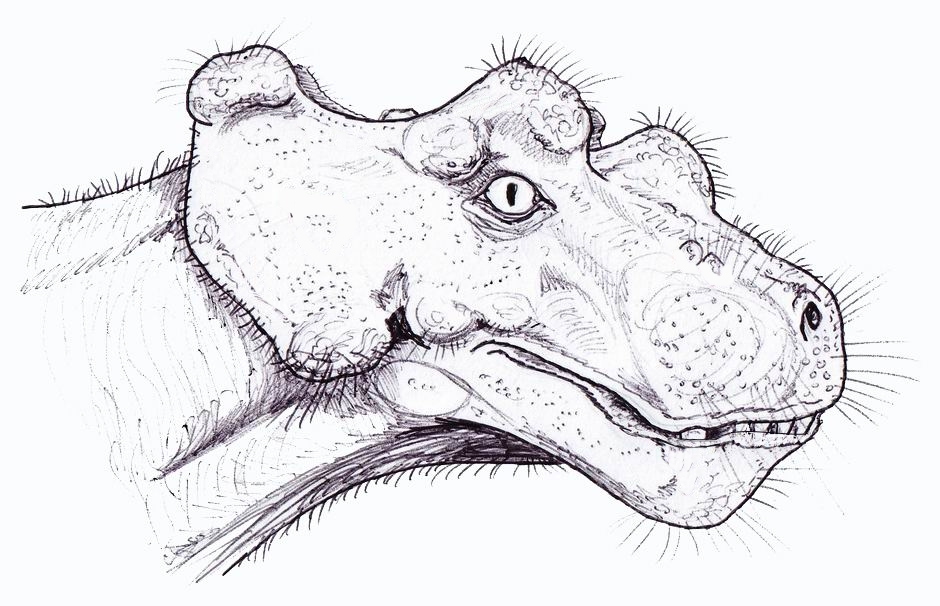
- Restorative portrait of the Permian synapsid (mammal precursor) Burnetia
  †Burnetia
  - †Burnetia alta – or unidentified comparable form
- †Bynumia

== C ==
- †Calapoecia
  - †Calapoecia coxi
- †Calcisphaera
  - †Calcisphaera laevis
  - †Calcisphaera pachysphaerica
- †Camaraspis
  - †Camaraspis convexa
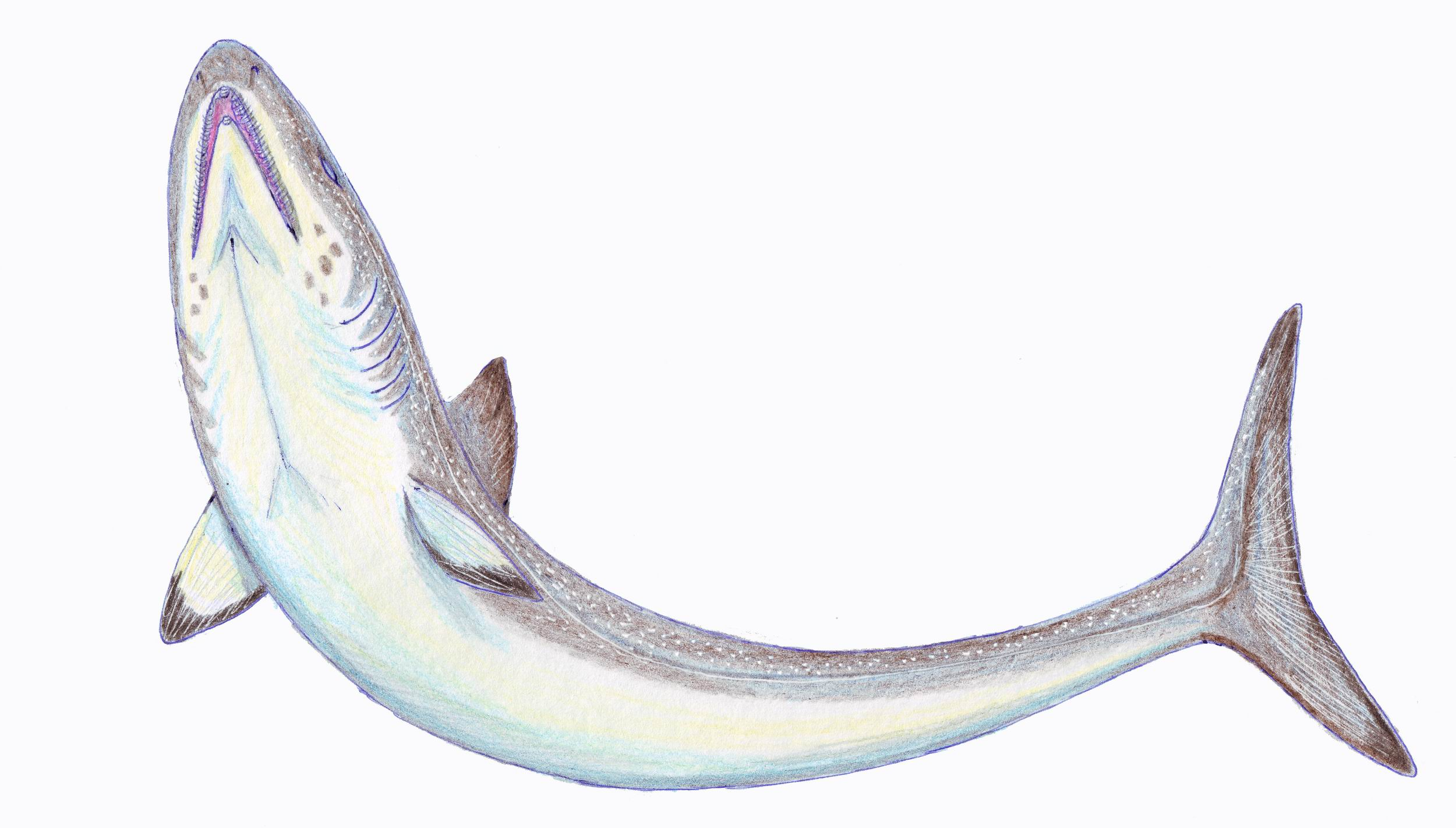
- Life restoration of the Carboniferous Chimaera relative
  †Campodus
- †Camptonectes – tentative report
- †Cancrinella
  - †Cancrinella phosphatica
- †Caneyella
- †Caninia
  - †Caninia nevadensis
- †Cardipeltis
  - †Cardipeltis bryanti
  - †Cardipeltis richardsoni
  - †Cardipeltis wallacii
- †Carlinia
  - †Carlinia amsdeniana
- †Cassianoides
  - †Cassianoides sexcostatus – type locality for species
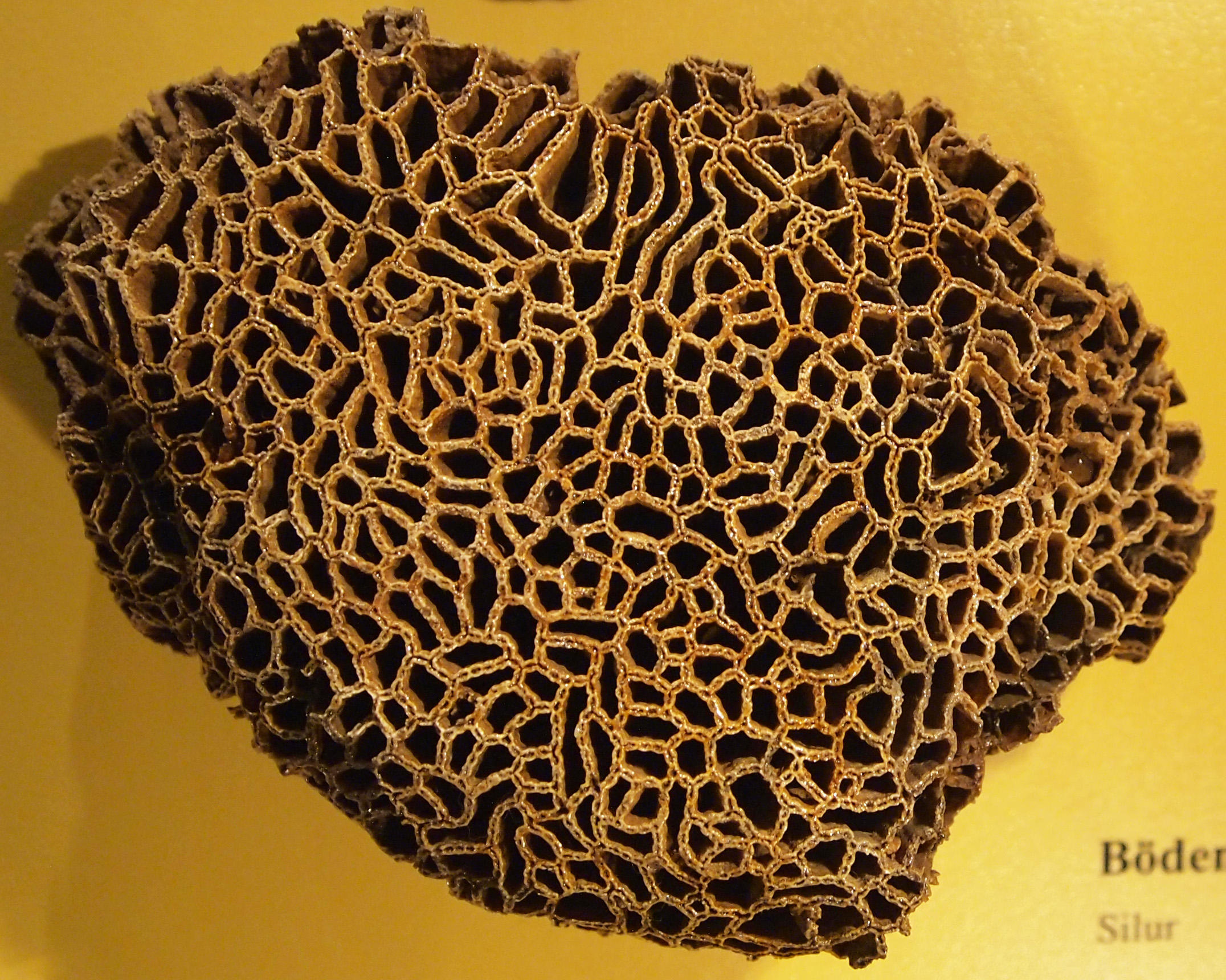
- Fossil of the Ordovician-Silurian tabulate coral Catenipora
  †Catenipora
  - †Catenipora robusta
- †Cavellina
  - †Cavellina bransoni
- †Cavusgnathus
  - †Cavusgnathus unicornis
- †Cedaria
- †Cedarina
- †Celtoides – type locality for genus
  - †Celtoides unioniformis – type locality for species
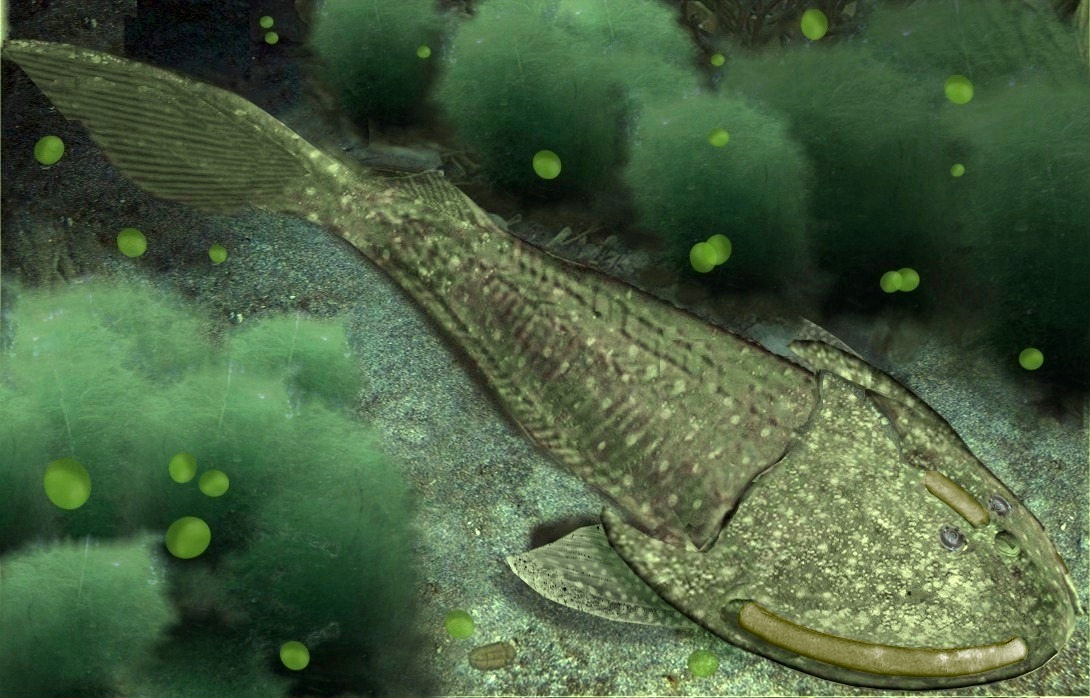
- Life restoration of the Early Devonian jawless fish Cephalaspis
  †Cephalaspis
  - †Cephalaspis wyomingense
- †Ceraunocochlis
- †Chaetetes
  - †Chaetetes eximius – or unidentified comparable form
  - †Chaetetes wyomingensis
- †Charactoceras – tentative report
- †Cheilocephalus
  - †Cheilocephalus delandi
- †Chirognathus
  - †Chirognathus alternata
  - †Chirognathus curvidens
  - †Chirognathus delicatulus
  - †Chirognathus monodactyla
  - †Chirognathus multidens
  - †Chirognathus reversa
  - †Chirognathus tenuidentatus
  - †Chirognathus unguliformis
- †Chonetes
- †Cibecuia
  - †Cibecuia gouldii – or unidentified comparable form
- †Cinclidonema
  - †Cinclidonema clausepeakensis – type locality for species
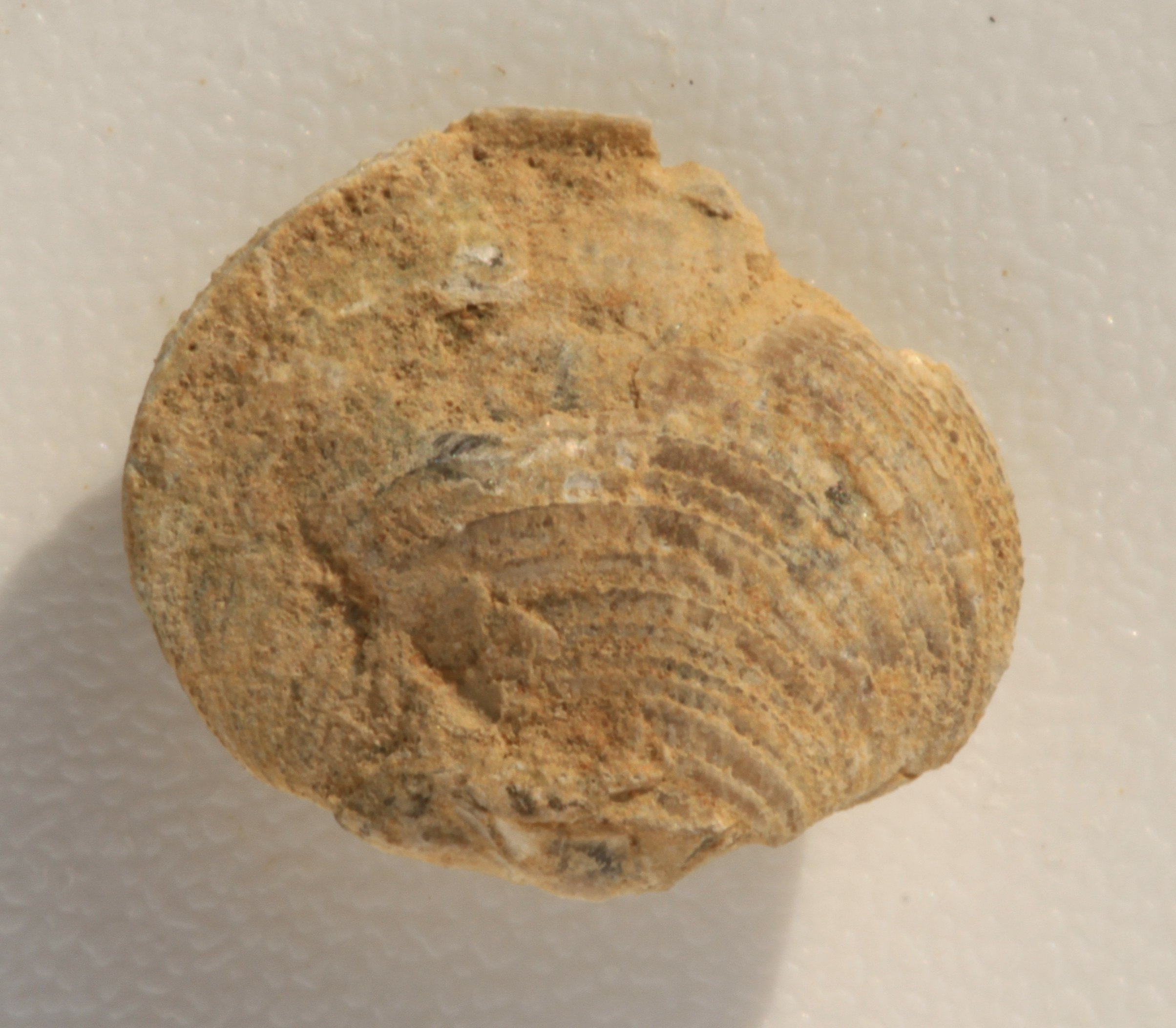
- Fossilized shell of the Middle Devonian-Permian brachiopod Cleiothyridina
  †Cleiothyridina
  - †Cleiothyridina atrypoides
  - †Cleiothyridina elegans – or unidentified related form
  - †Cleiothyridina hirsuta
  - †Cleiothyridina sublamellosa – or unidentified related form
- †Clelandia
  - †Clelandia typicalis
- †Cliffa
  - †Cliffa lataegenae
- †Cliffia
  - †Cliffia lataegenae
- †Climacammina
- †Coelogasteroceras
  - †Coelogasteroceras mexicanum
  - †Coelogasteroceras thomasi – type locality for species
- †Coleodus
  - †Coleodus simplex
- †Colpites
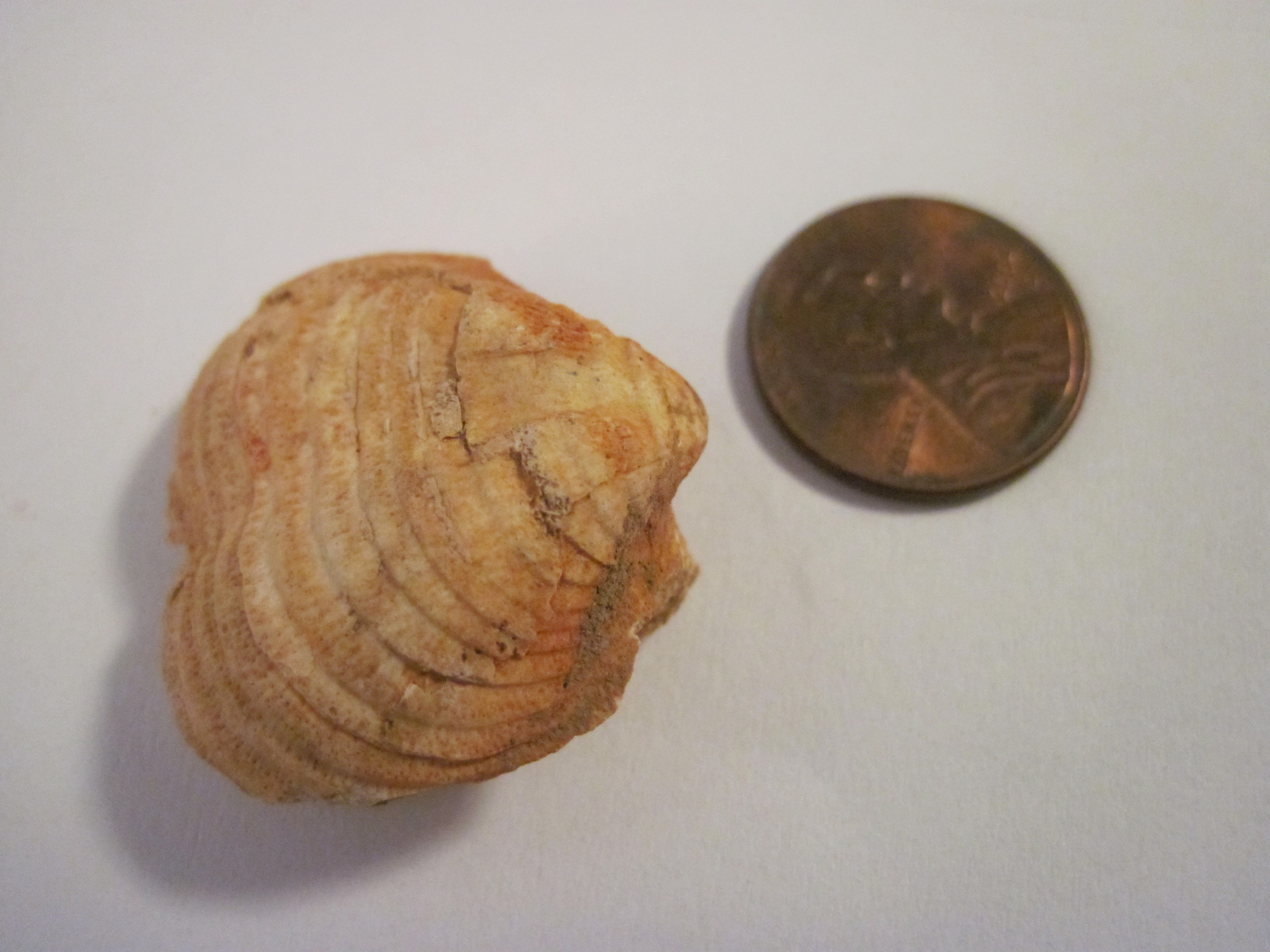
- Fossilized shell of the Late Devonian-Permian brachiopod Composita
  †Composita
  - †Composita elongata
  - †Composita laevis – or unidentified related form
  - †Composita mira
  - †Composita ovata
  - †Composita poposiensis
  - †Composita sigma
  - †Composita subquadrata
  - †Composita subtilita
  - †Composita sulcata
- †Conocardium
- †Coosella
- †Coosia
  - †Coosia alethes
- †Coosina
  - †Coosina ariston
- †Cordylodus
  - †Cordylodus concinnus – tentative report
- Cornuspira
- †Crassidonta
  - †Crassidonta stuckenbergi
- †Crepicephalus
  - †Crepicephalus auratus
  - †Crepicephalus buttsimontanaensis
  - †Crepicephalus rectus
- †Crurithyris
  - †Crurithyris arcuata
  - †Crurithyris arcuatus
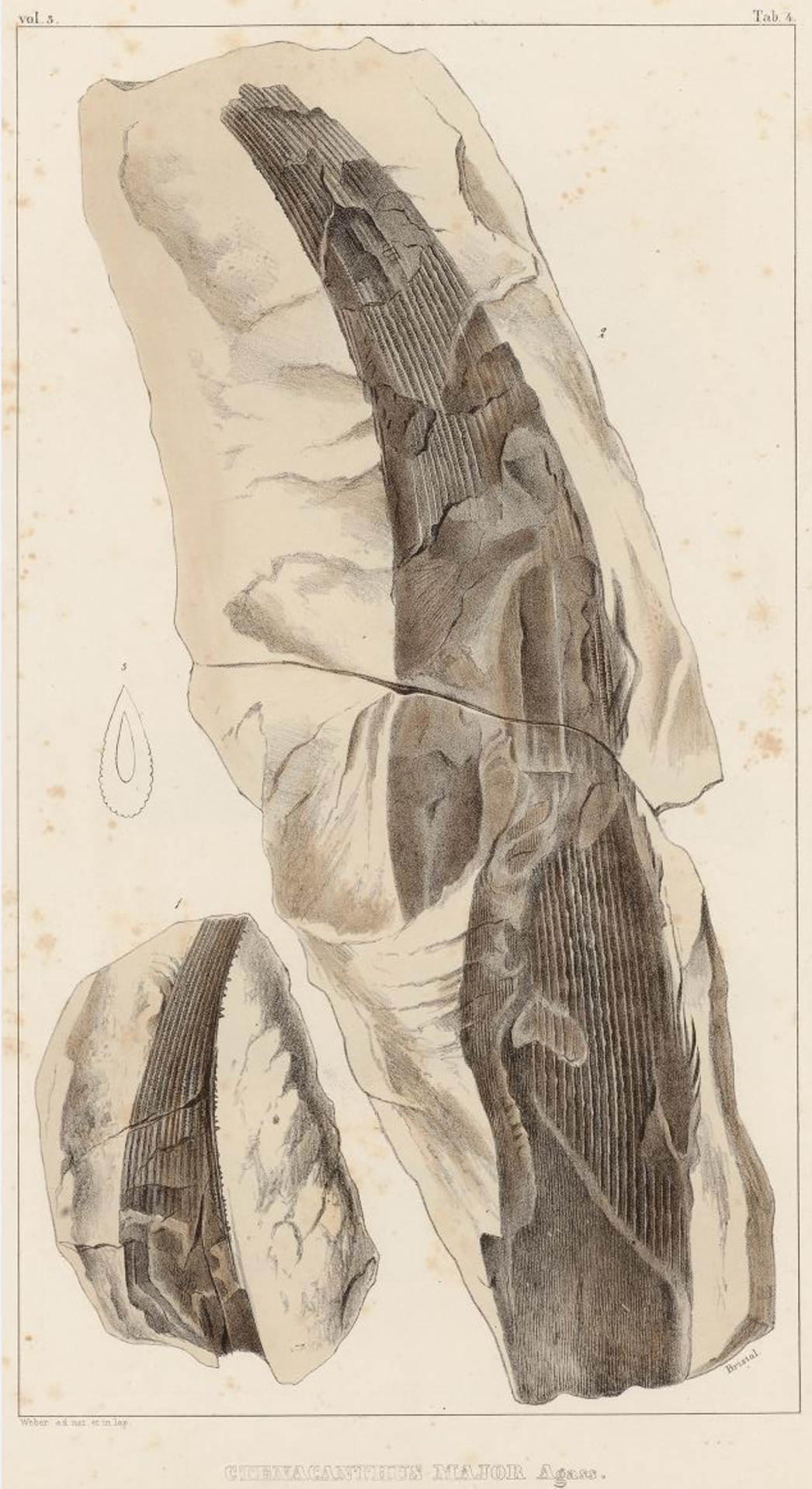
- Fossil of the Carboniferous shark Ctenacanthus
  †Ctenacanthus
  - †Ctenacanthus amblyxiphias
  - †Ctenacanthus mutabilis – type locality for species
  - †Ctenacanthus obscuracostatus – type locality for species
- †Ctenalosia
  - †Ctenalosia transversa – type locality for species
- †Cuffeyella
  - †Cuffeyella arachnoidea
- †Cupulocrinus
  - †Cupulocrinus latibrachiatus – or unidentified comparable form
- †Cyclites
  - †Cyclites depressus – or unidentified comparable form
- †Cyclospira – tentative report
  - †Cyclospira anticostiana
- †Cymbosporites
  - †Cymbosporites proteus
  - †Cymbosporites senex
- †Cypricardella – tentative report
- †Cyrtogomphoceras
- †Cyrtoniodus
  - †Cyrtoniodus complicatus
  - †Cyrtoniodus erectus
- †Cyrtorostra
  - †Cyrtorostra varicostata – type locality for species
- Cytherella – report made of unidentified related form or using admittedly obsolete nomenclature
  - †Cytherella benniei
- †Cytogomphoceras

== D ==
- †Deckera
  - †Deckera completa – or unidentified comparable form
- †Delaria
  - †Delaria sevilloidia – type locality for species
- †Della
  - †Della suada
- †Deltodus
  - †Deltodus mercurei
- †Dendrocrinus
- †Densonella
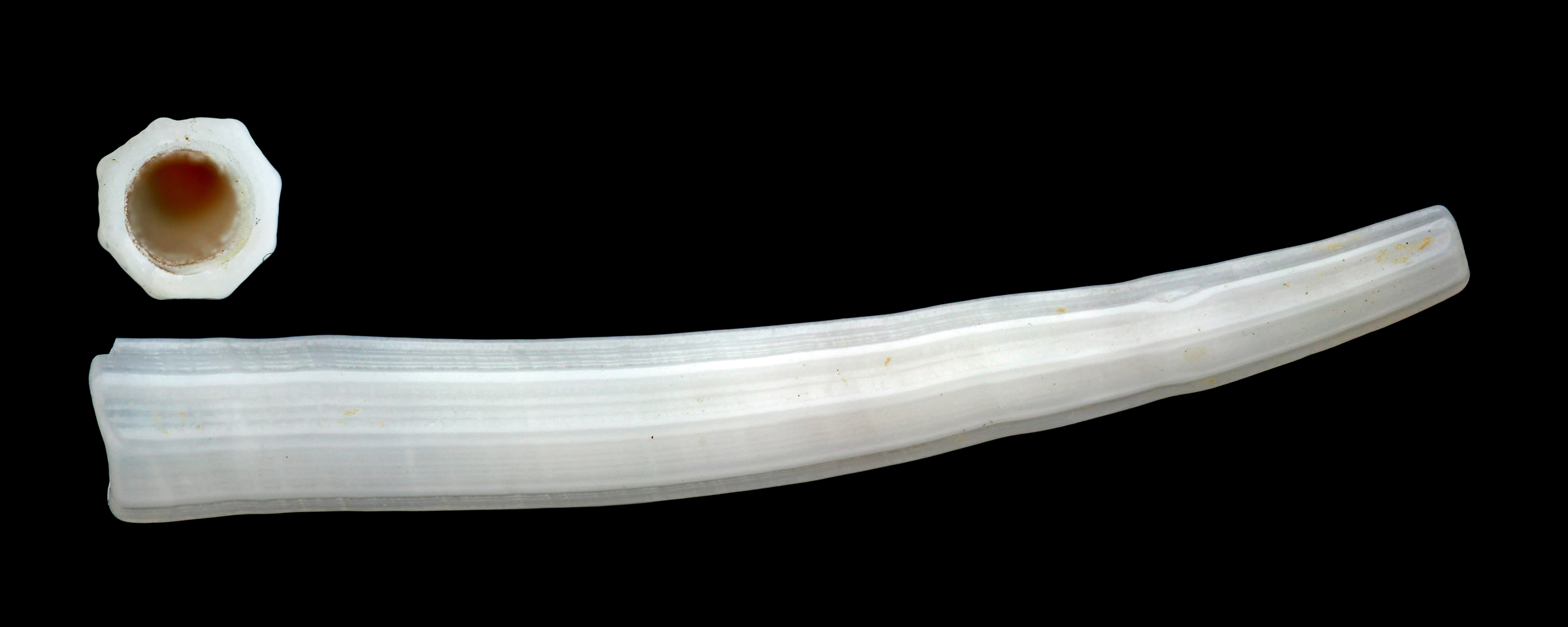
- Shell of a Dentalium tusk shell
  †Dentalium
- †Derbyia
  - †Derbyia magna
  - †Derbyia robusta – or unidentified comparable form
- †Diaphragmus
  - †Diaphragmus nivosus
- †Dibolisporites
  - †Dibolisporites abitibiensis
  - †Dibolisporites eifeliensis
  - †Dibolisporites wetteldorfensis
- †Dicellomus
  - †Dicellomus amblia
- †Diceromyonia
  - †Diceromyonia storeya
- †Dictyonina
- †Dictyotomaria
  - †Dictyotomaria carlbransoni – type locality for species
- †Dielasma
  - †Dielasma fabiforme – type locality for species
- †Diestoceras
- †Dimorphosiphon
  - †Dimorphosiphon talbotorum
- †Dinorthis
  - †Dinorthis occidentalis
- †Diplosphaerina
- †Distichophytum
  - †Distichophytum ovatum
- †Dokimocephalus
- †Donaldina
  - †Donaldina pygmaea – or unidentified related form
- †Donaldospira
  - †Donaldospira geminocarinata
- †Drepanodos
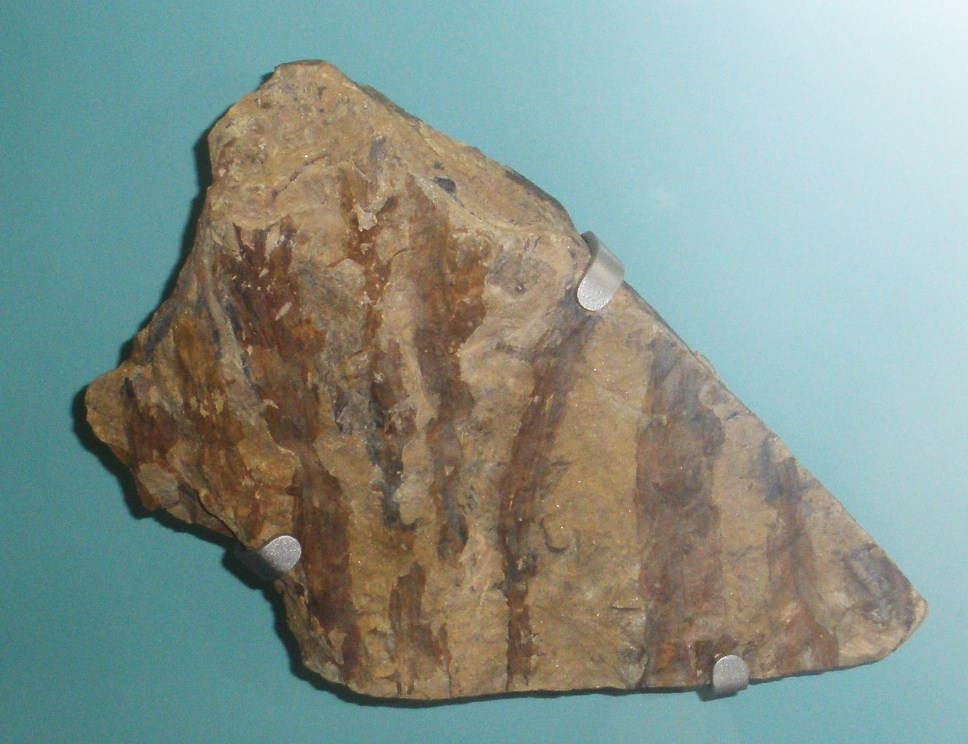
- Fossilized foliage from the Early-Late Devonian club moss relative Drepanophycus
  †Drepanophycus
  - †Drepanophycus devonicus
- †Duncanopora
  - †Duncanopora duncanae
- †Dysoristus
  - †Dysoristus lochmanae

== E ==
- †Earlandia
  - †Earlandia clavatula
  - †Earlandia elegans
- †Echinauris
  - †Echinauris magna
- †Echinoconchus
- †Ectenocrinus
- †Ectodemites
  - †Ectodemites warei
- †Edmondia
  - †Edmondia gibbosa
  - †Edmondia phosphatica
  - †Edmondia phosphoriensis – or unidentified comparable form
  - †Edmondia stuchburia
- †Eirlysia
  - †Eirlysia reticulata – or unidentified comparable form
- †Elvinia
  - †Elvinia roemeri
- †Emphanisporites
  - †Emphanisporites micrornatus
  - †Emphanisporites rotatus
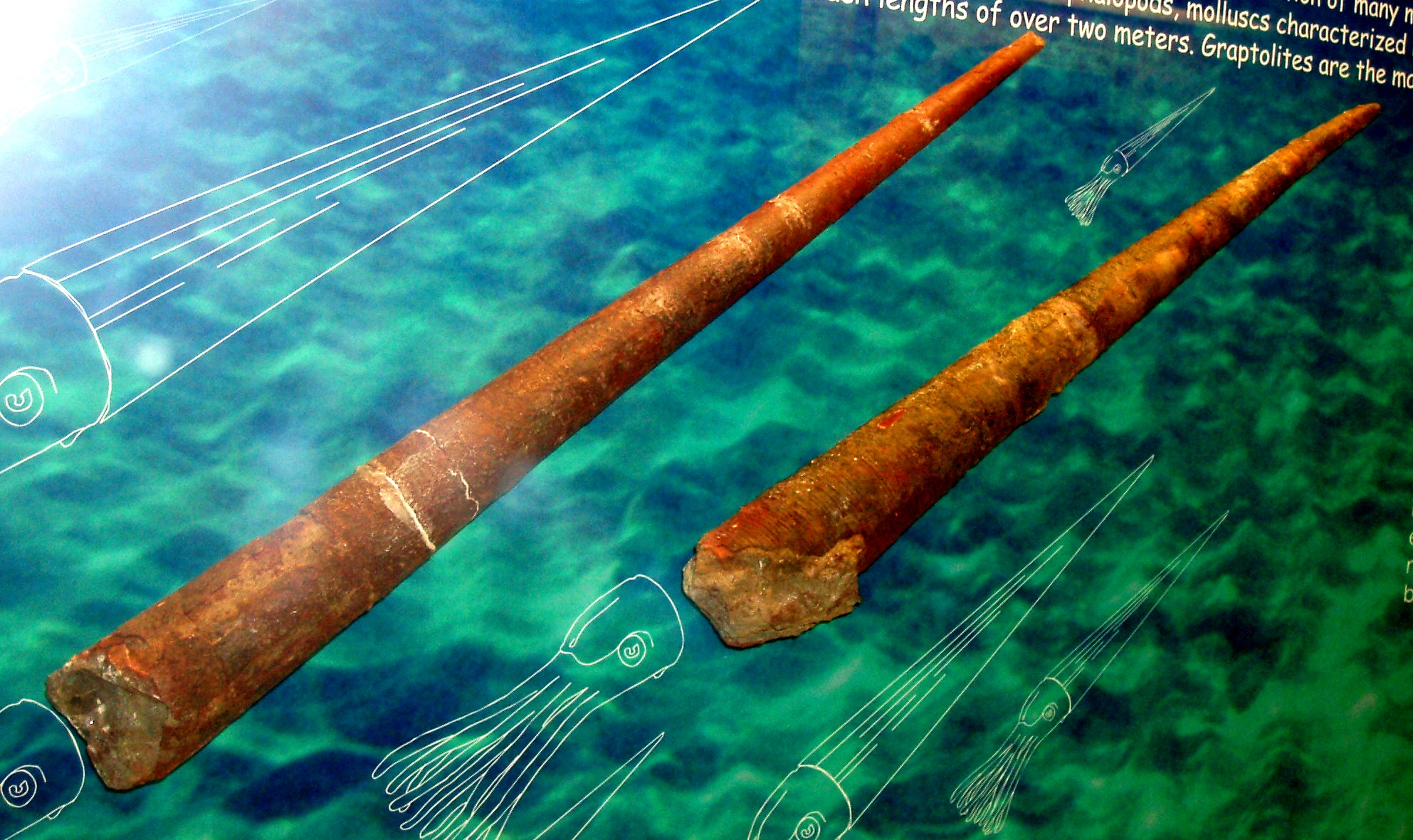
- Fossilized shells and restored appearances of the Middle-Late Ordovician nautiloid cephalopod Endoceras
  †Endoceras
- †Endothyra
  - †Endothyra bowmani – or unidentified loosely related form
  - †Endothyra excellens
  - †Endothyra prisca – or unidentified loosely related form
  - †Endothyra similis – or unidentified loosely related form
- †Endothyranella
- †Eoastarte – type locality for genus
  - †Eoastarte subcircularis – type locality for species
- †Eocamptonectes
  - †Eocamptonectes sculptilis
- †Eochonetes
  - †Eochonetes maearum – type locality for species
- †Eoorthis
  - †Eoorthis remnicha
- †Eoschubertella
- †Eostaffella
  - †Eostaffella acutissima – or unidentified loosely related form
  - †Eostaffella circuli
  - †Eostaffella pseudostruvei – or unidentified loosely related form
- †Eostaffellina
  - †Eostaffellina paraprotvae
- †Eotuberitina
- †Ephippiorthoceras
- †Eriptychius
  - †Eriptychius americanus
- †Erismodus
  - †Erismodus abbreviatus
  - †Erismodus typus
- †Eumetria
  - †Eumetria sulcata
- †Eunemacanthus
  - †Eunemacanthus keytei
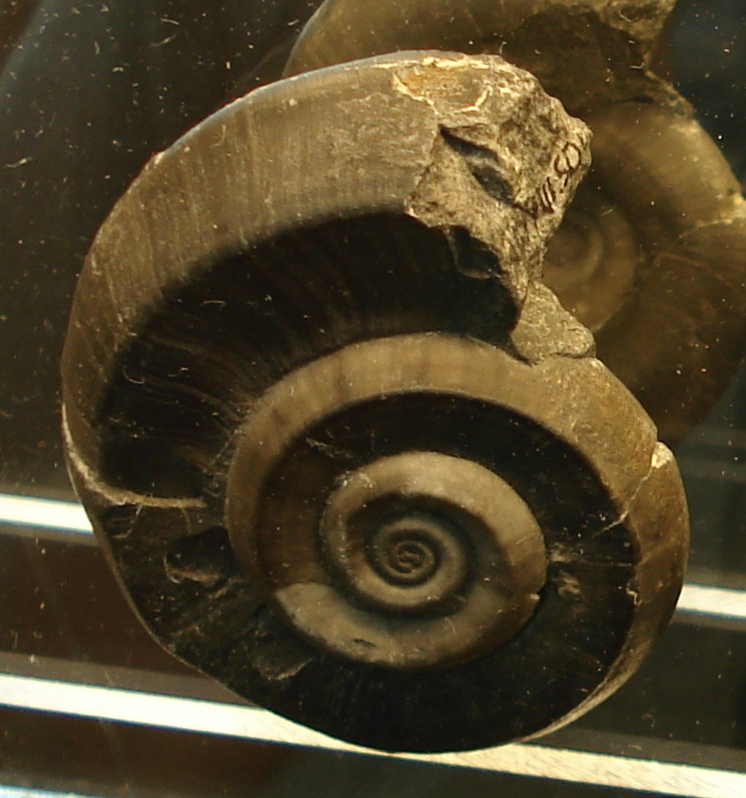
- Fossilized shell of the Silurian-Permian sea snail Euomphalus
  †Euomphalus
  - †Euomphalus plummeri – or unidentified related form
- †Euphemites
  - †Euphemites crenulatus
  - †Euphemites fremontensis – type locality for species
  - †Euphemites luxuriosus
  - †Euphemites sacajawensis
  - †Euphemites sparciliratus
- †Euphemitopsis
  - †Euphemitopsis multinodosa
  - †Euphemitopsis subpapillosa
- †Eurekia

== F ==
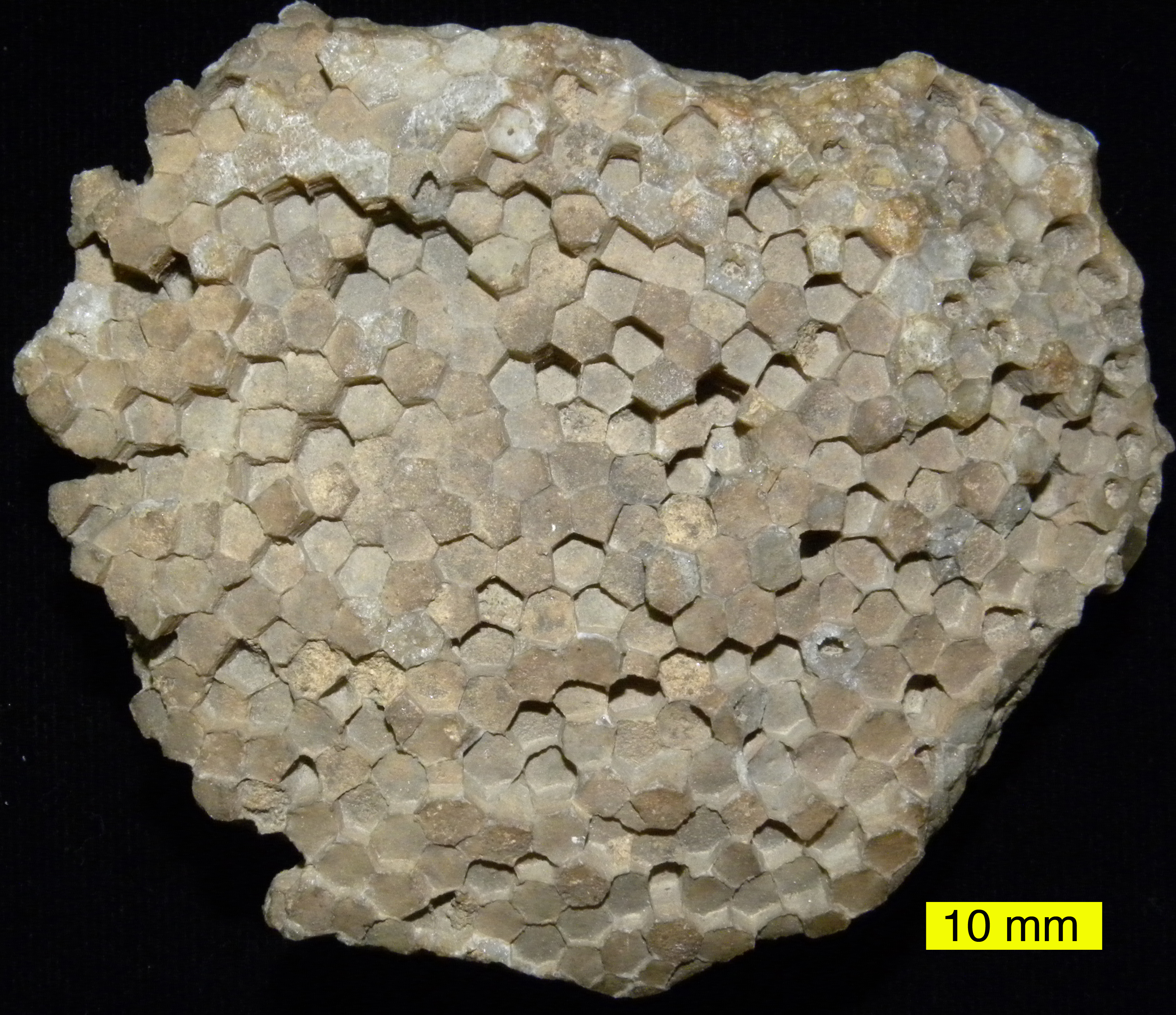
- Fossil of the Late Ordovician-Permian tabulate coral Favosites
  †Favosites
  - †Favosites prolificus – or unidentified comparable form
- †Flexaria – tentative report
- †Foerstephyllum
- †Fransonia
  - †Fransonia wyomingensis

== G ==
- †Gallatinospongia – type locality for genus
  - †Gallatinospongia conica – type locality for species
- †Gastrioceras – report made of unidentified related form or using admittedly obsolete nomenclature
  - †Gastrioceras williamsi – type locality for species
- †Genevievella
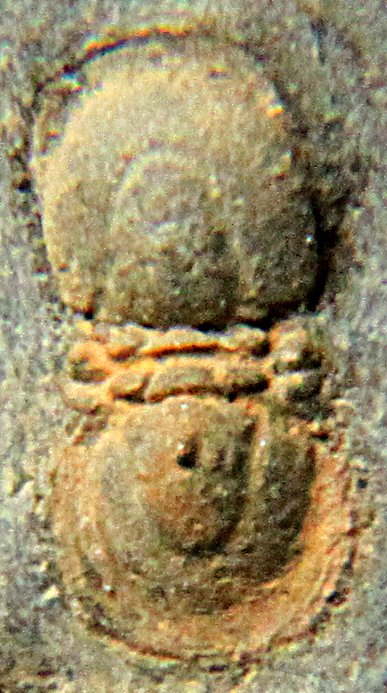
- Fossil of the Early-Late Ordovician trilobite Geragnostus
  †Geragnostus
  - †Geragnostus insoltus
- †Girtyella
  - †Girtyella indianensis – or unidentified comparable form
- †Girtypecten
  - †Girtypecten sublaqueatus
- †Girtyspira
- †Girvanella
- †Glabrocingulum
  - †Glabrocingulum alveozonum
  - †Glabrocingulum coronatum
  - †Glabrocingulum texanum
- †Glaphyraspis
  - †Glaphyraspis occidentalis
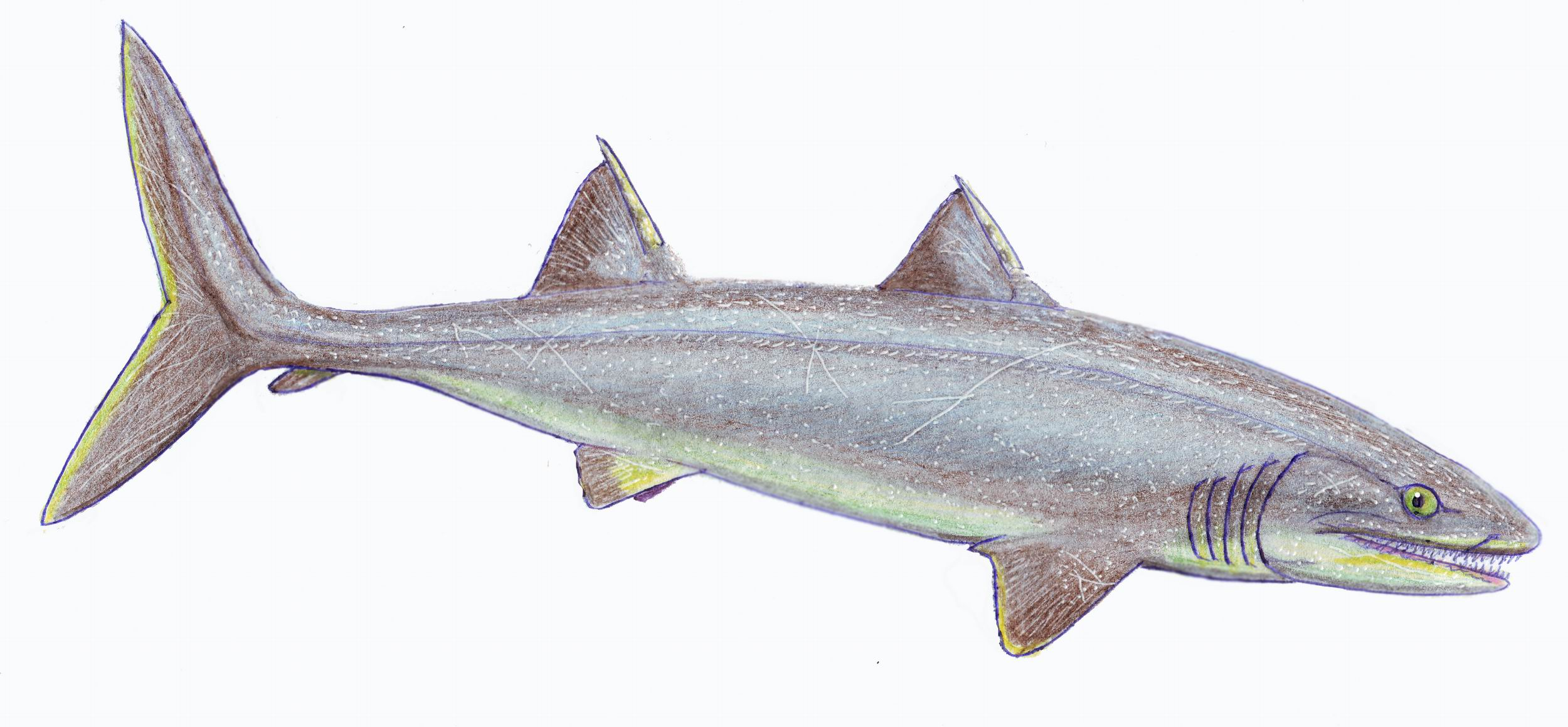
- Life restoration of the Carboniferous shark Glikmanius
  †Glikmanius
  - †Glikmanius occidentalis
- †Globivalvulina
  - †Globivalvulina bulloides – or unidentified loosely related form
- †Globoendothyra
- †Glyphaspis
  - †Glyphaspis tetonensis
- †Glyptopleura
  - †Glyptopleura multicostata
- †Gnamptorhynchos
  - †Gnamptorhynchos prayi
- †Goniasma – tentative report
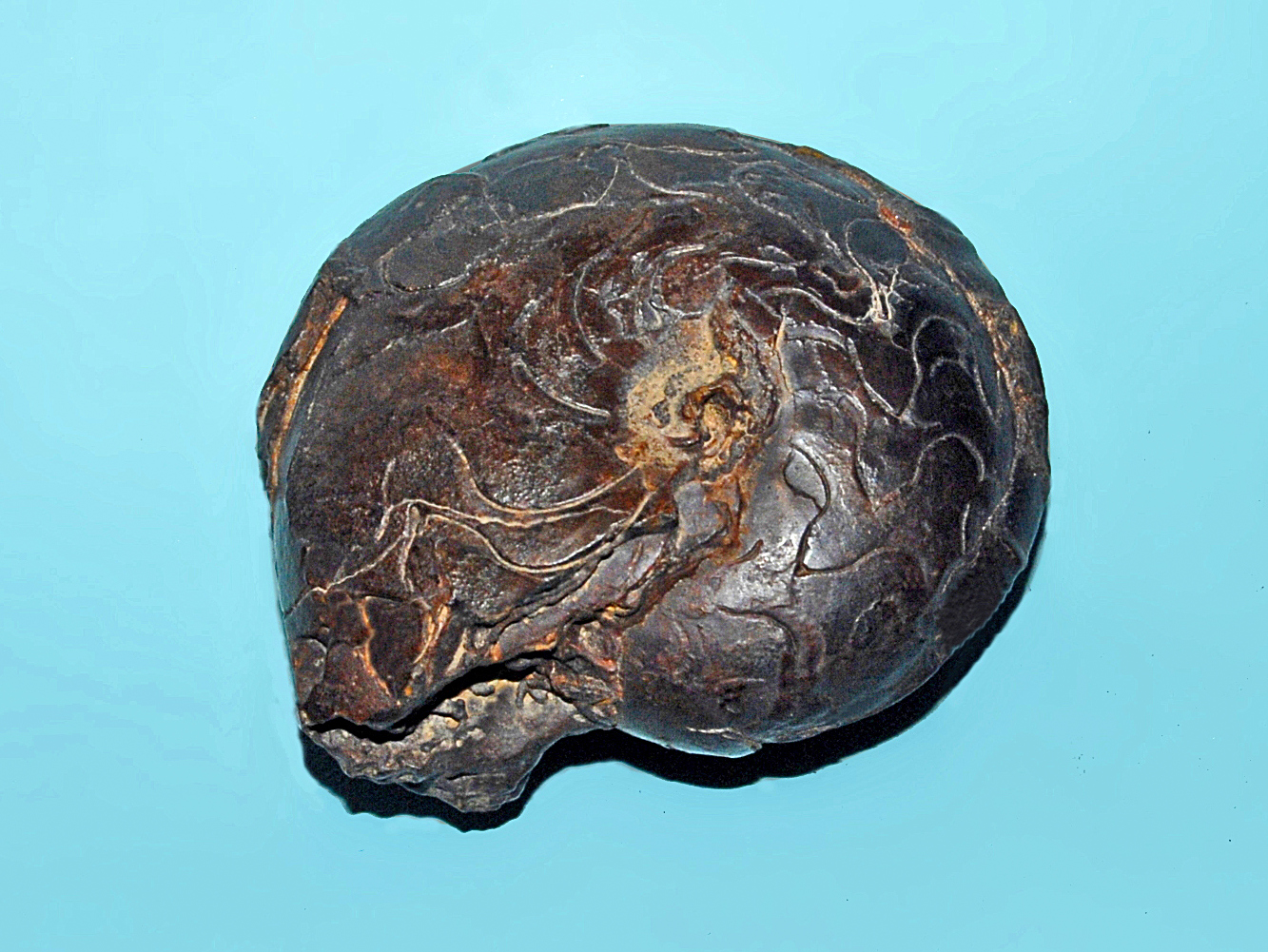
- Fossilized shell of the Late Devonian-Late Triassic ammonoid cephalopod Goniatites
  †Goniatites – tentative report
- †Goniophora – tentative report
- †Gosseletina
  - †Gosseletina idahoensis – type locality for species
  - †Gosseletina permiana
- †Gosslingia
  - †Gosslingia americana
- †Grandispora
  - †Grandispora biornata – tentative report
  - †Grandispora douglastownense
  - †Grandispora macrotuberculata – tentative report
  - †Grandispora micronata
- †Guizhoupecten
  - †Guizhoupecten cheni
  - †Guizhoupecten tubicostata – type locality for species

== H ==
- †Hadragnostus
  - †Hadragnostus modestus
- †Hamatus
  - †Hamatus phosphoriensis
- †Healdia
  - †Healdia ornata
- †Helemacanthus
  - †Helemacanthus incurvus
- †Helicelasma
  - †Helicelasma selectum
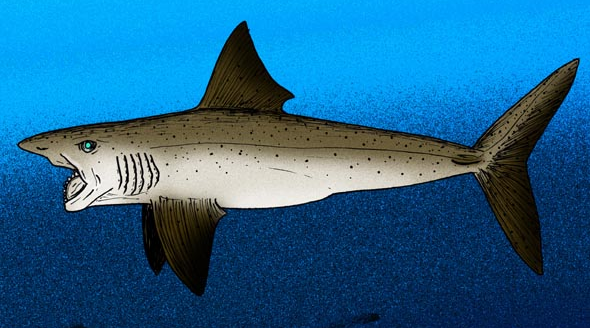
- Life restoration of the Permian Chimaera relative Helicoprion
  †Helicoprion
  - †Helicoprion davisii
- †Helodus
  - †Helodus rugosus
  - †Helodus subpolitus – type locality for species
- †Heslerodus
  - †Heslerodus divergens
- †Hesperorthis
  - †Hesperorthis pyramidalis – or unidentified comparable form
- †Heteropecten
  - †Heteropecten vanvleeti – or unidentified comparable form
- †Hibbardella
- †Hiscobeccus
  - †Hiscobeccus gigas
- †Holcacephalus
  - †Holcacephalus tenerus
- †Hollina
  - †Hollina occidentalis
- †Hollinella
  - †Hollinella typica
- †Holophragma – report made of unidentified related form or using admittedly obsolete nomenclature
- †Homagnostus
- †Hormotoma
- †Hostimella
- †Housia
- †Hustedia
  - †Hustedia phosphoriensis
- †Hydroscorpius – type locality for genus
  - †Hydroscorpius denisoni – type locality for species
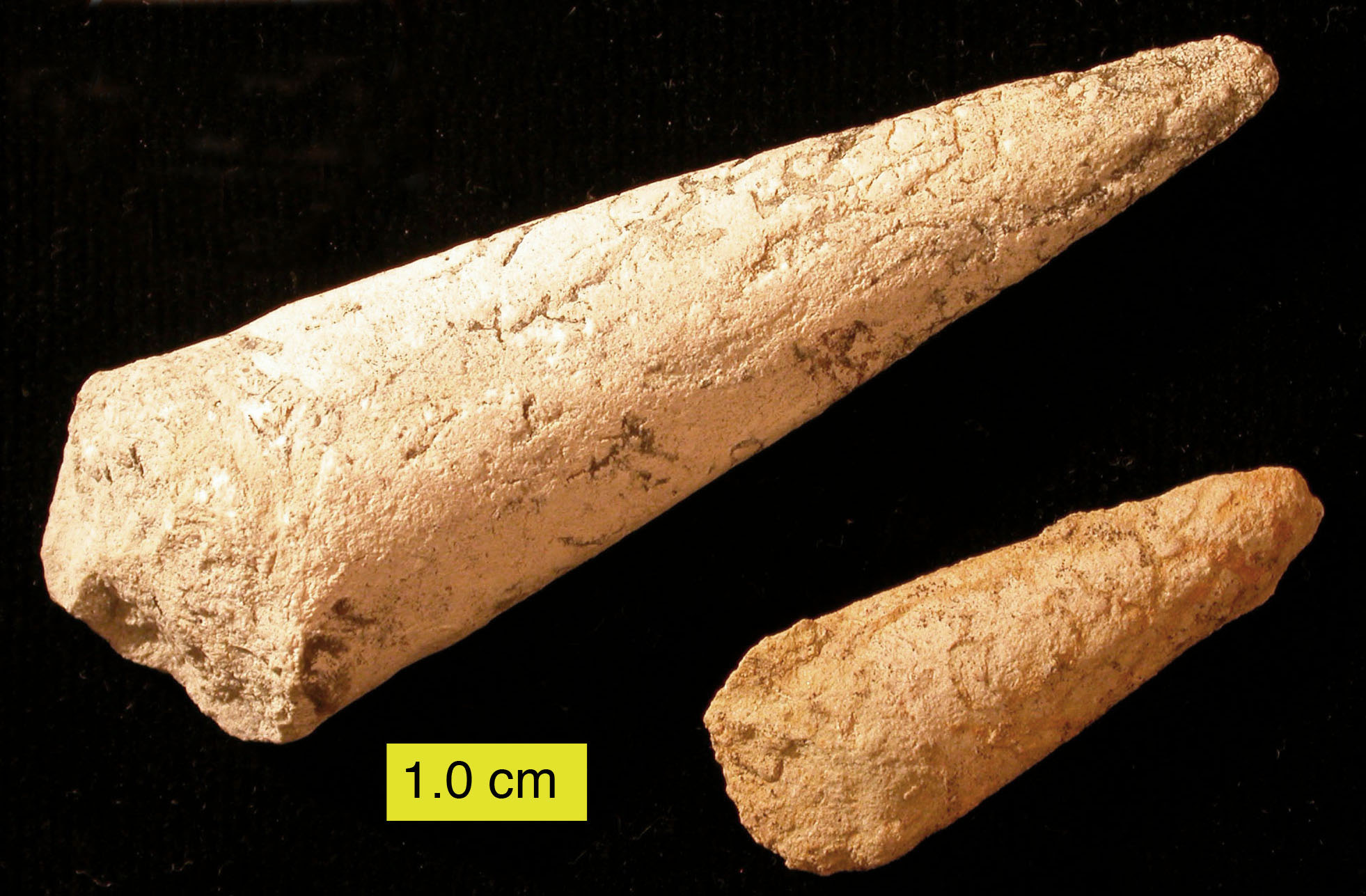
- Fossilized shells of the Cambrian-Permian brachiopod relative Hyolitha
  †Hyolithes
  - †Hyolithes primordialis
- †Hypergonia
  - †Hypergonia percostata
- †Hypseloconus
  - †Hypseloconus simplex
- †Hypsiptycha
  - †Hypsiptycha anticostiense
  - †Hypsiptycha anticostiensis
  - †Hypsiptycha neenah – or unidentified comparable form
- †Hystriculina

== I ==
- †Ianthinopsis
- †Idiognathoides
  - †Idiognathoides corrugata
  - †Idiognathoides sinuata
- †Illaenurus
  - †Illaenurus priscus
- †Incrustatospongia – type locality for genus
  - †Incrustatospongia superficiala – type locality for species
- †Inflatia
  - †Inflatia lovei
- †Ithyektyphus
  - †Ithyektyphus tetonensis

== J ==
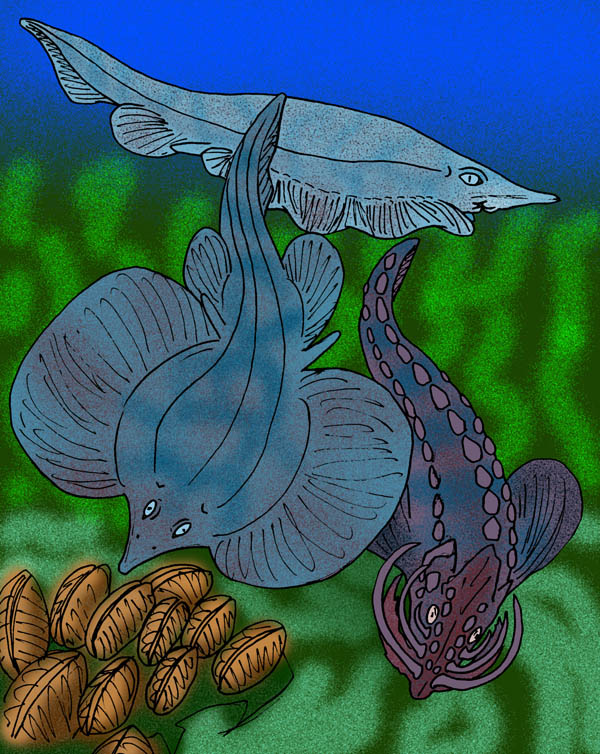
- Restoration of the Carboniferous-Permian ray-like cartilaginous fish Janassa (top and left)
  †Janassa
  - †Janassa angularis
  - †Janassa unguicula
  - †Janassa unguiformis
- †Jonesina
  - †Jonesina carbonifera
- †Josina – type locality for genus
  - †Josina festiva – type locality for species
- †Juresania

== K ==
- †Kaibabella
  - †Kaibabella basilica – type locality for species
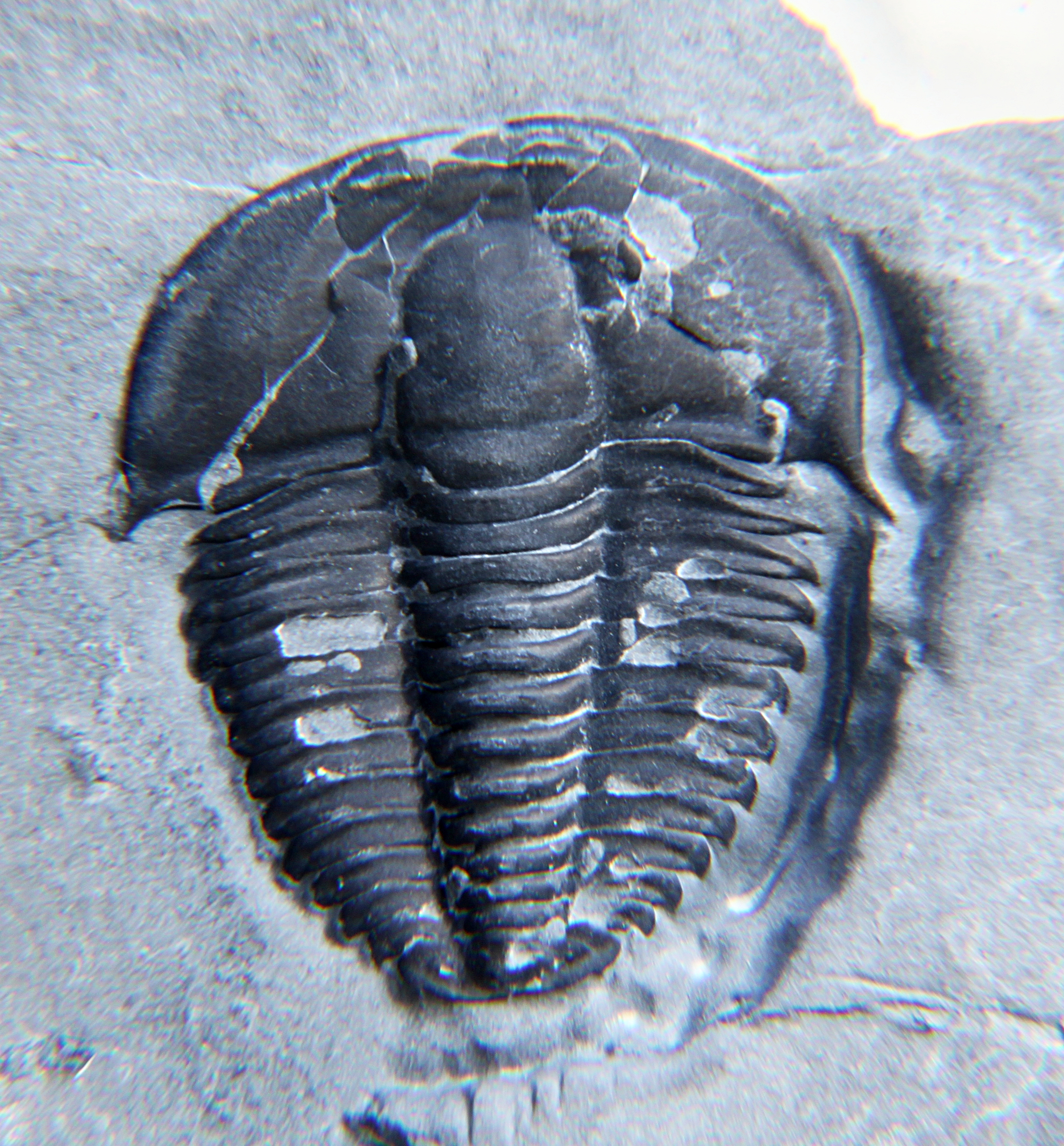
- Fossil of the Cambrian trilobite Kendallina
  †Kendallina
  - †Kendallina eryon
- †Kingstonia
  - †Kingstonia walcotti
- †Kionoceras
- †Kochoceras
- †Komiella
  - †Komiella ostiolata
- †Kormagnostus
  - †Kormagnostus seclusus
- †Kyphocephalus

== L ==
- †Lambeoceras
- †Lamellospira
  - †Lamellospira alveozona – type locality for species
- †Lampraspis
  - †Lampraspis tuberculata
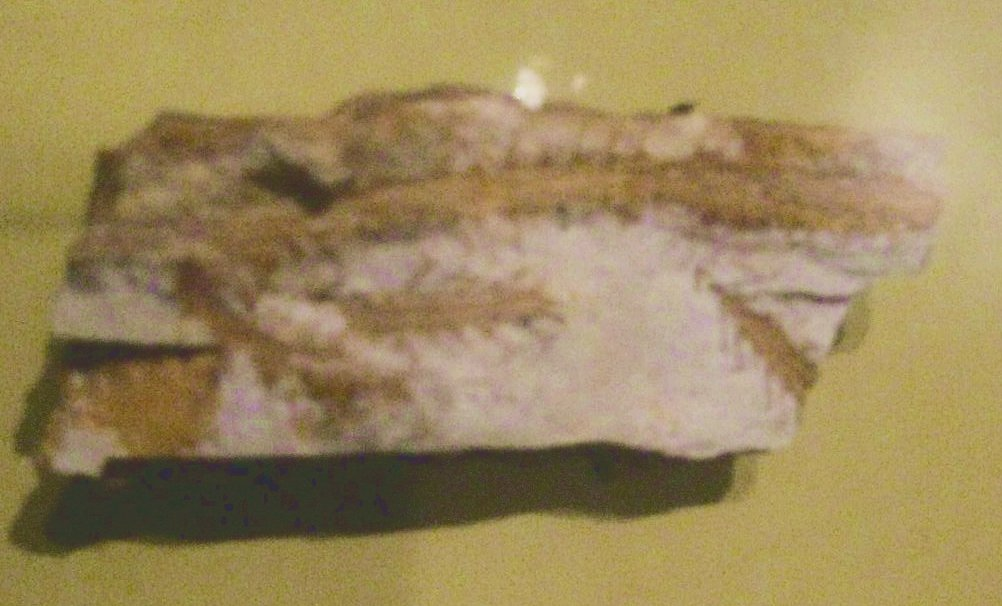
- Fossils of the Middle Devonian clubmoss Leclercqia
  †Leclercqia
  - †Leclercqia complexa
- †Leiorhynchus
  - †Leiorhynchus weeksi
- †Lepidocyclus
- †Leptochondria
  - †Leptochondria curtocardinalis – type locality for species
- †Leptodesma
- †Levizygopleura
  - †Levizygopleura inornata – or unidentified comparable form
- †Limipecten – tentative report
- †Linglella
  - †Linglella modesta
- †Lingula
  - †Lingula carbonaria
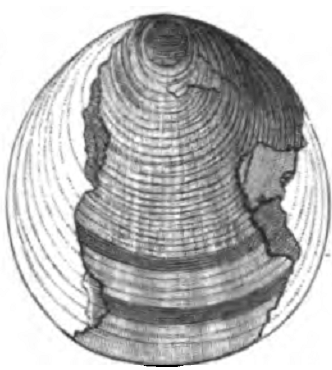
- Illustration of a fossilized shell of the Cambrian-Late Ordovician brachiopod Lingulella
  †Lingulella
  - †Lingulella modesta
- †Linnarssonella
  - †Linnarssonella girtyi
  - †Linnarssonella girtyyi
- †Linoproductus
  - †Linoproductus eastoni
  - †Linoproductus planiventralis
- †Liosotella – tentative report
- †Lipinella
- †Liroceras
- †Lobocorallium
  - †Lobocorallium trilobatum
- †Lonchocephalus
- †Lonchodus
- †Lyroschizodus
  - †Lyroschizodus oklahomensis – or unidentified comparable form

== M ==
- †Machaeracanthus
  - †Machaeracanthus minor
- †Maclurina
  - †Maclurina manitobensis
- †Maclurites
- †Macrostylocrinus
  - †Macrostylocrinus wyomingensis – type locality for species
- †Marginifera
  - †Marginifera haydenensis
- †Maryvillia
- †Meekella
  - †Meekella attenuata
- †Meekopinna
  - †Meekopinna sagitta
- †Meekospira
- †Megamyonia
  - †Megamyonia nitens
- †Meniscocoryphe
  - †Meniscocoryphe platycephala
- †Meniscocryphe
  - †Meniscocryphe platycephala
- †Mesolobus
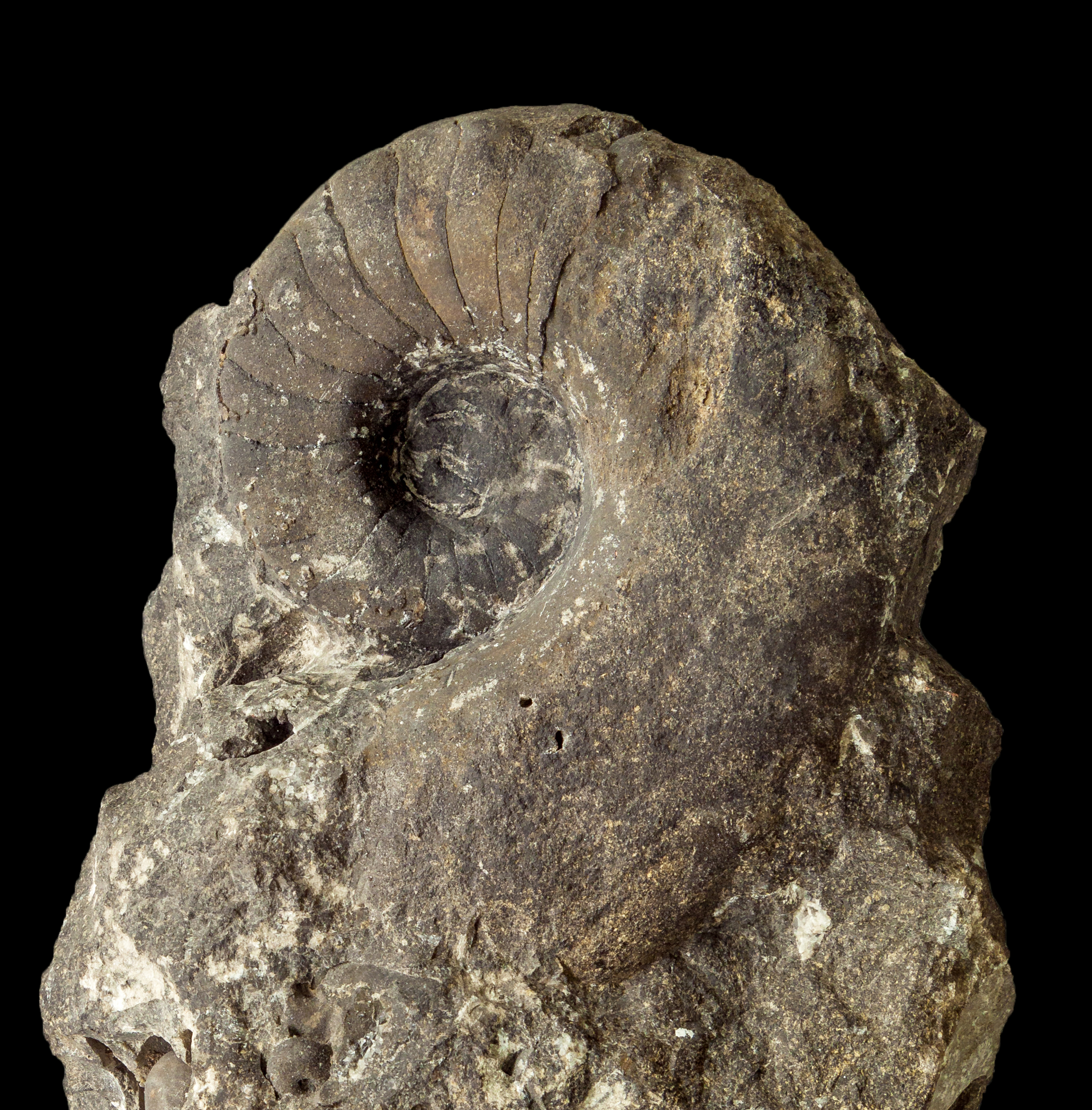
- Fossilized shell of the Carboniferous-Permian nautiloid cephalopod Metacoceras
  †Metacoceras
  - †Metacoceras knighti – type locality for species
  - †Metacoceras sulciferum – type locality for species
- †Meteoraspis
- †Microcoelodus
  - †Microcoelodus breviconus
  - †Microcoelodus unicornis
- †Microdoma – tentative report
- †Micromitra
  - †Micromitra modesta
- †Millerella
  - †Millerella pressa
  - †Millerella pura – or unidentified related form
- †Miltonella
  - †Miltonella shupei
- †Minicephalus – type locality for genus
  - †Minicephalus primus – type locality for species
- †Modocia
- †Monocheilus
  - †Monocheilus truncatus
- †Mooreoceras – tentative report
- †Mourlonia
- †Multithecopora
  - †Multithecopora amsdenensis
- †Myalina
  - †Myalina aviculoides
  - †Myalina sinuata – type locality for species
  - †Myalina wyomingensis

== N ==
- †Nahannagnostus
  - †Nahannagnostus nganasanicus
- †Nasutimena
  - †Nasutimena fluctuosa
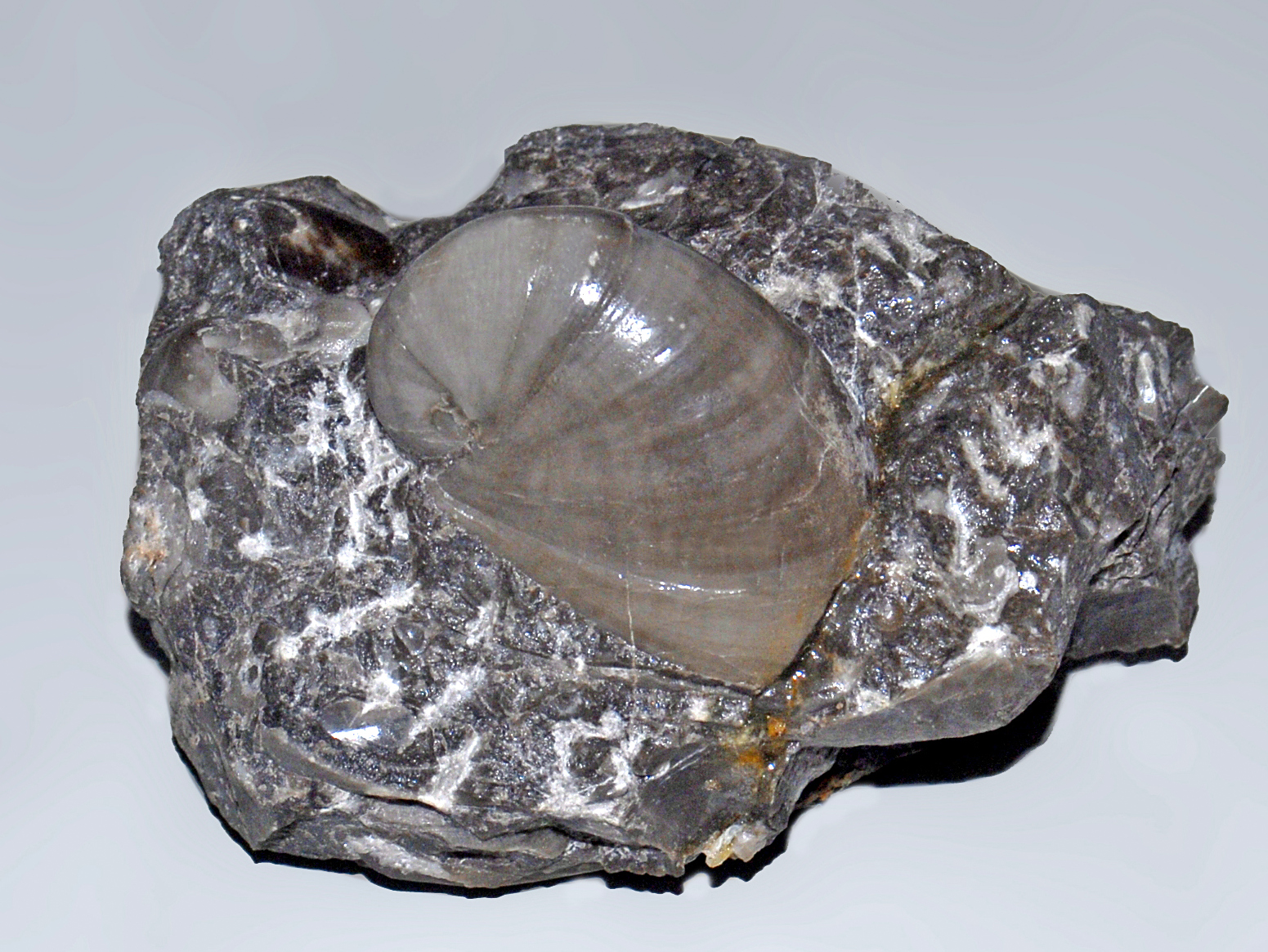
- Fossilized shell of the Early Devonian – Triassic sea snail Naticopsis
  †Naticopsis
  - †Naticopsis judithae
  - †Naticopsis kaibabensis
  - †Naticopsis marthaae – or unidentified comparable form
- †Natiria
  - †Natiria americana
- †Neoarchaediscus
  - †Neoarchaediscus incertus
  - †Neoarchaediscus parvus
- †Neocoleodus
  - †Neocoleodus spicatus
- †Neokoninckophylllum
  - †Neokoninckophylllum inconstans
- †Neokoninckophyllum
  - †Neokoninckophyllum hamatilis
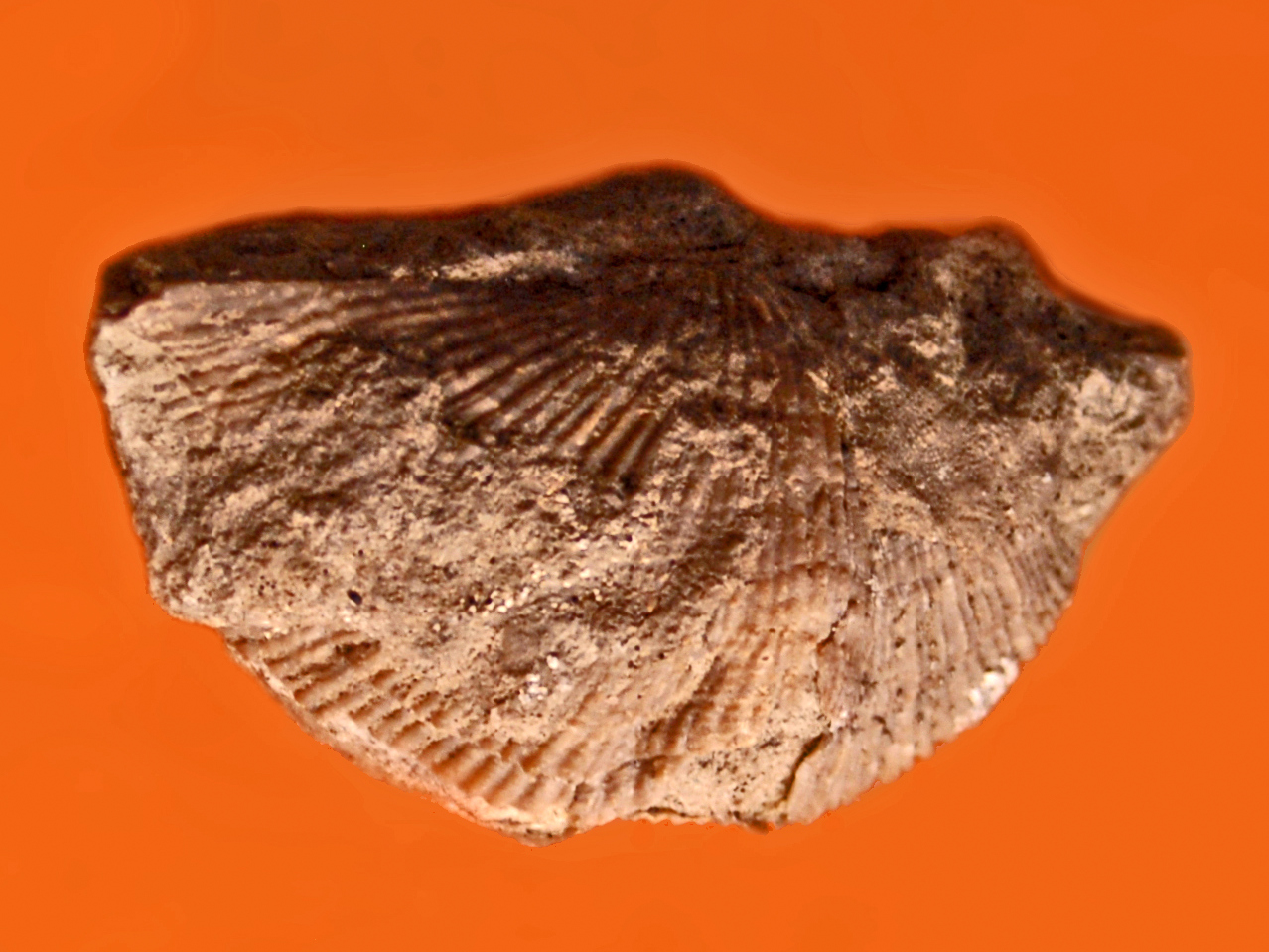
- Fossilized shell of the Carboniferous-Permian brachiopod Neospirifer
  †Neospirifer
  - †Neospirifer bakeri
- †Nixonella
- Nucula – tentative report
- †Nuculopsis
  - †Nuculopsis montpelierensis
  - †Nuculopsis poposiensis – type locality for species
  - †Nuculopsis pulchra
- †Nuferella – tentative report
  - †Nuferella puncta

== O ==
- †Obliquipecten
- †Ocnerorthis
  - †Ocnerorthis cooperi
- †Oepikina
  - †Oepikina pergibbosa – or unidentified comparable form
- †Oistodus
  - †Oistodus curvatus
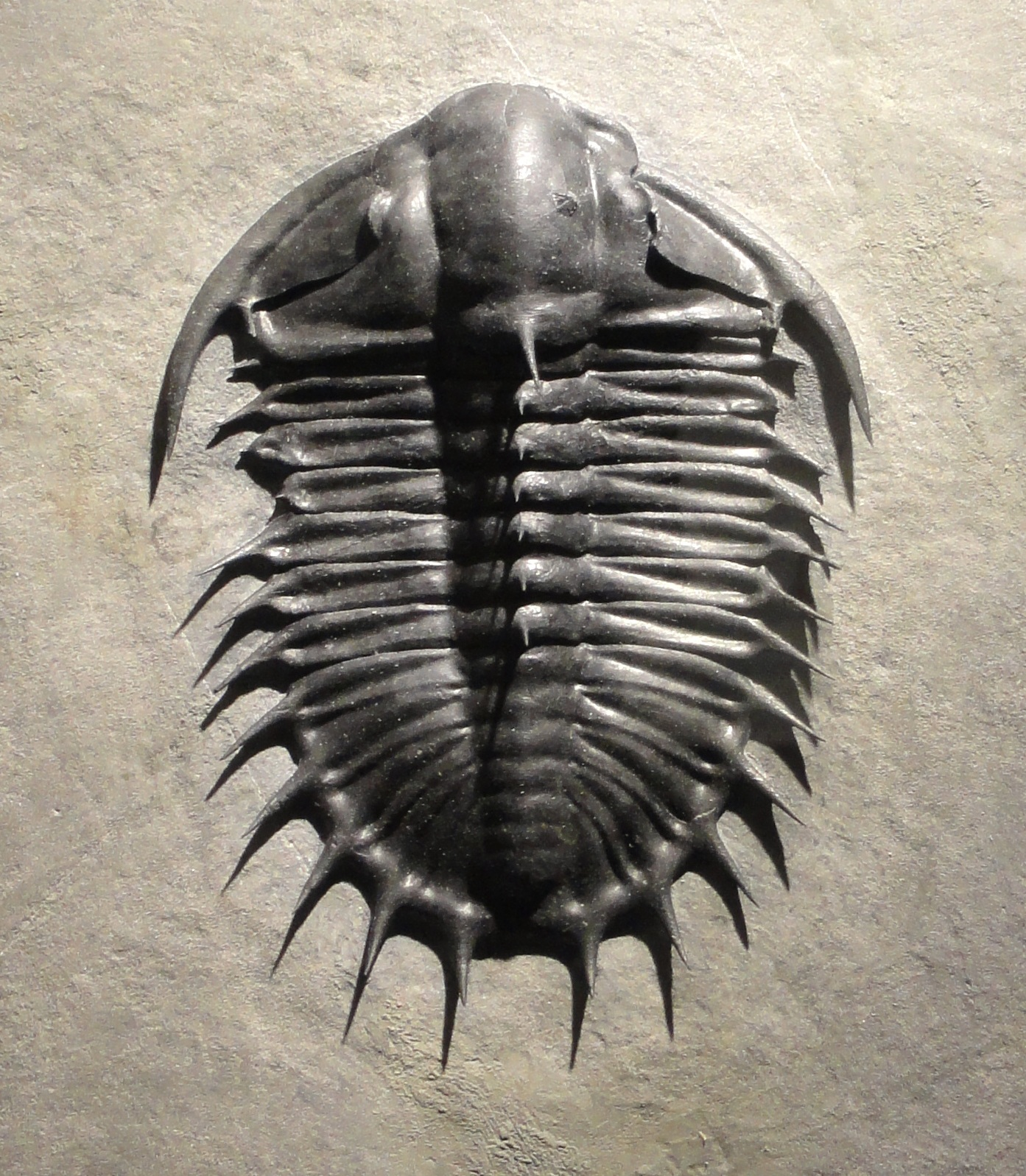
- Fossil of the Cambrian trilobite Olenoides
  †Olenoides
  - †Olenoides incertus – or unidentified comparable form
- †Onchus
  - †Onchus penetrans
  - †Onchus peracutus
- †Orbiculoidea
  - †Orbiculoidea missouriensis
  - †Orbiculoidea utahensis
  - †Orbiculoidea wyomingensis
- †Oreaspis
  - †Oreaspis ampla
  - †Oreaspis dunklei
  - †Oreaspis williamsi
- †Oriocrassatella
  - †Oriocrassatella elongata – type locality for species
- †Orthonema
- †Orthotetes
  - †Orthotetes kaskaskiensis
- †Orthothetina
  - †Orthothetina amsdenensis
- †Otusia
- †Ovatia
  - †Ovatia croneisi
  - †Ovatia muralis
- †Ozarkodina

== P ==
- †Paladin
  - †Paladin moorei
- †Palaeoneilo
  - †Palaeoneilo mcchesneyana
- †Palaeonubecularia – or unidentified comparable form
- †Palaeophyllum
  - †Palaeophyllum gracile
  - †Palaeophyllum humei
- †Palaeotextularia
  - †Palaeotextularia consobrina – or unidentified loosely related form
  - †Palaeotextularia longiseptata – or unidentified loosely related form
- †Paleocuticularia – type locality for genus
  - †Paleocuticularia perforata – type locality for species
- †Paleofavosites
  - †Paleofavosites prayi
- †Paleyoldia
  - †Paleyoldia amsdenensis
- †Paltodus
- †Parabolinoides
  - †Parabolinoides expansus
- †Paracedaria
- †Paracedarina
- †Paractinoceras
- †Parajuresania
  - †Parajuresania nebrascensis
- †Parallelodon
  - †Parallelodon multistriatus – or unidentified comparable form
- †Paraschizodus – type locality for genus
  - †Paraschizodus elongatus – type locality for species
- †Paraspiriferina
  - †Paraspiriferina formulosa – type locality for species
- †Parehmania
  - †Parehmania inornata
- †Peripetoceras
- †Permophorus
  - †Permophorus albequus
  - †Permophorus pricei – type locality for species
- †Pernopecten
- †Petrocrania
- †Pharkidonotus
  - †Pharkidonotus altitropis – type locality for species
- †Phestia
  - †Phestia perumbonata
- †Pimmacanthus
  - †Pimmacanthus inequistriatus
- †Plaesiomys
  - †Plaesiomys rockymontana – or unidentified related form
- †Plagioglypta
- †Planoendothyra
- †Planospirodiscus
- †Platyceras
  - †Platyceras yochelsoni – type locality for species
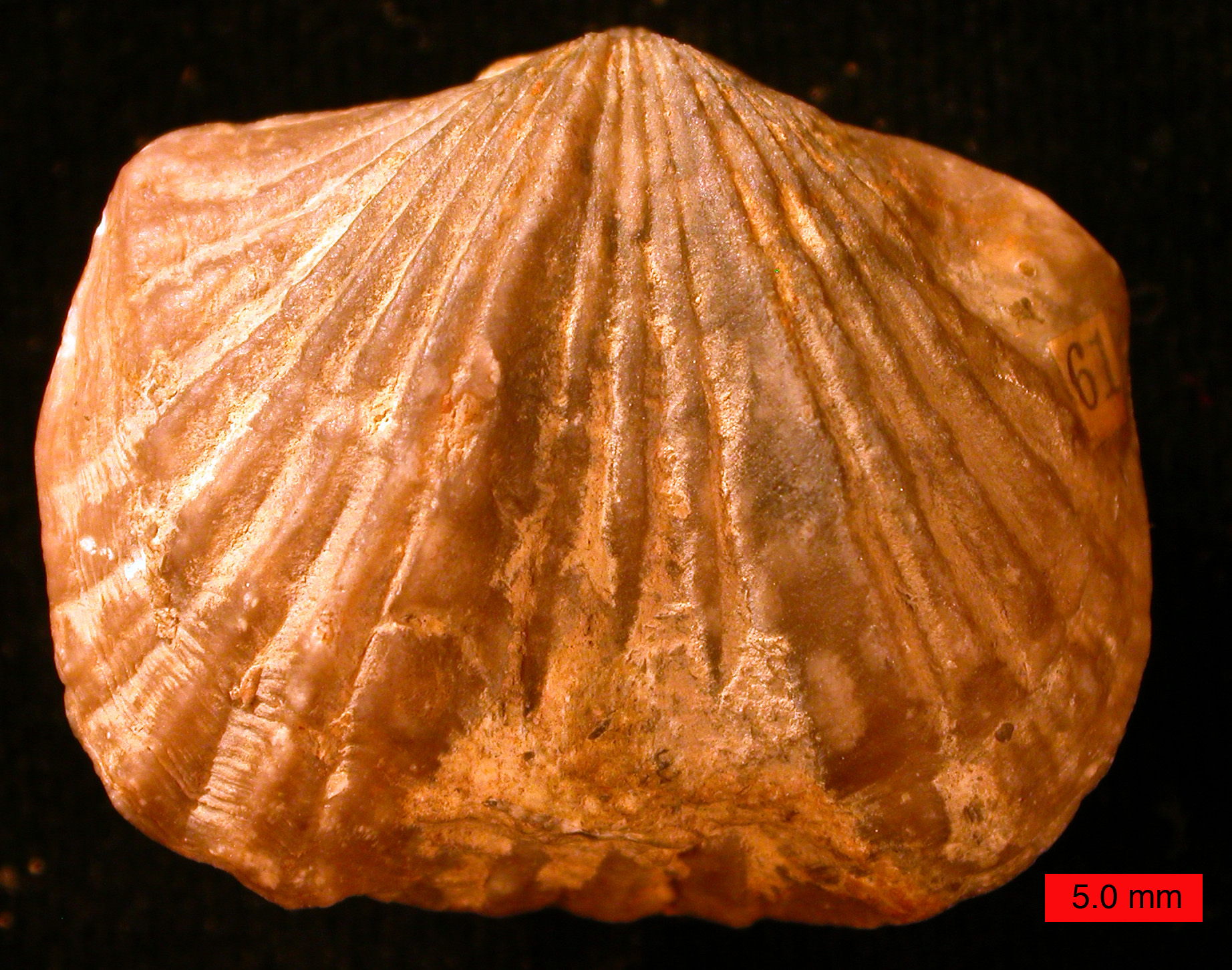
- Fossilized shell of the Middle Ordovician-Silurian brachiopod Platystrophia
  †Platystrophia
  - †Platystrophia equiconvexa
- †Plethopletis
  - †Plethopletis arbucklensis
- †Pleurosiphonella
  - †Pleurosiphonella drummondi
- †Polidevcia
  - †Polidevcia bellistriata
  - †Polidevcia obesa
- †Polycaulodus
  - †Polycaulodus bidentatus
- †Posidonia
- †Praearcturus
- †Proagnostus – or unidentified comparable form
- †Procostatoria
  - †Procostatoria sexradiata
- †Prodentalium
  - †Prodentalium canna
- †Protaspis
  - †Protaspis brevispina
  - †Protaspis mcgrewi
  - †Protaspis ovata
  - †Protaspis sculpta
  - †Protaspis transversa
- †Prototreta
- †Pseudagnostus
  - †Pseudagnostus douvillei
  - †Pseudagnostus prolongus – or unidentified comparable form
- †Pseudobythocypris – tentative report
  - †Pseudobythocypris amsdenensis
- †Pseudoendothyra
  - †Pseudoendothyra kremenskensis – or unidentified loosely related form
- †Pseudogastrioceras
- †Pseudoglomospira
- †Pseudomatthevia
  - †Pseudomatthevia conica
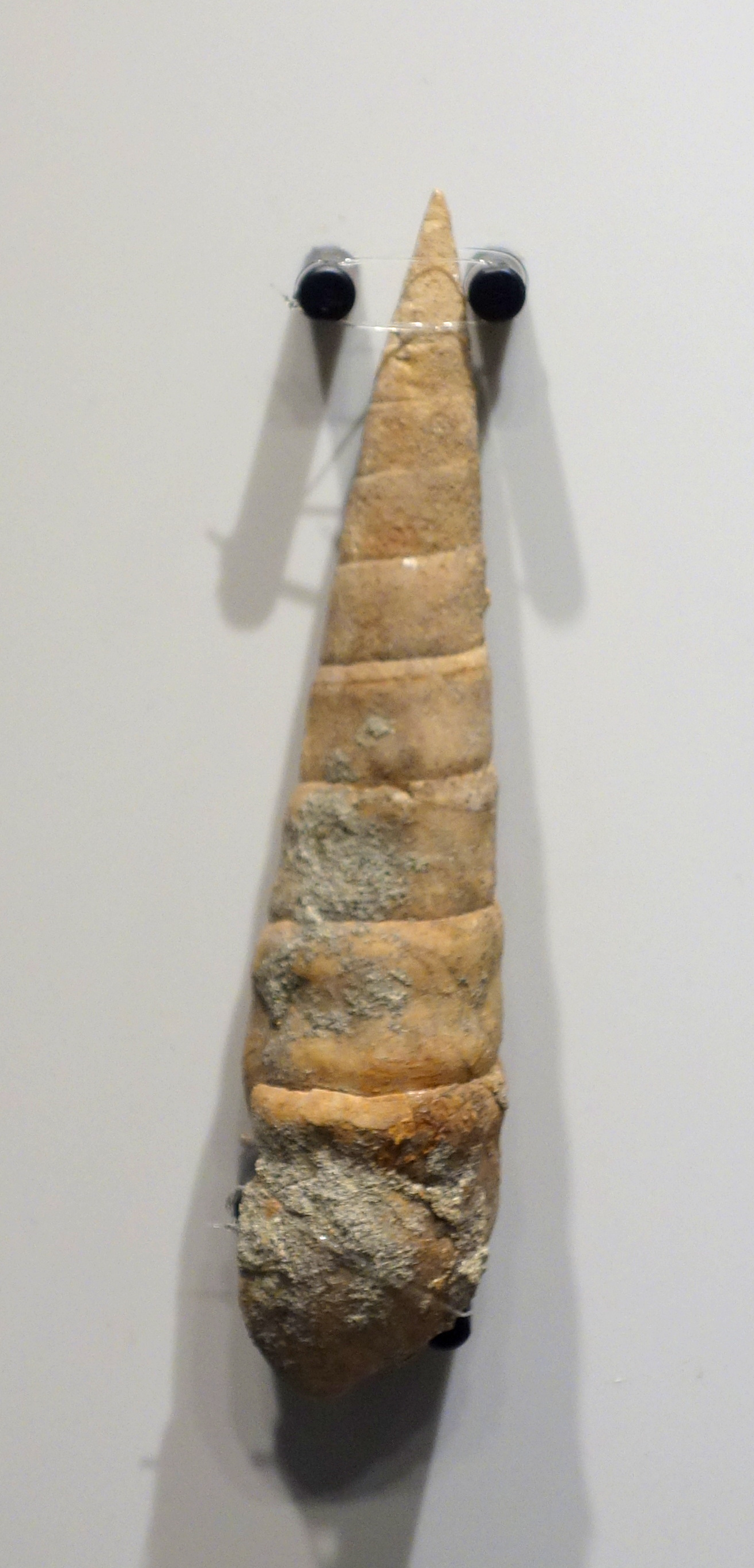
- Fossilized shell of a Pseudomelania sea snail
  †Pseudomelania – tentative report
- †Pseudomonotis
  - †Pseudomonotis likharevi
- †Pseudorthoceras
  - †Pseudorthoceras knoxense
- †Pseudovidrioceras
  - †Pseudovidrioceras girtyi
- †Pseudozygopleura
  - †Pseudozygopleura croneisi
  - †Pseudozygopleura girtyi – or unidentified comparable form
- †Psilophyton
  - †Psilophyton wyomingense – type locality for species
- †Pterocephalia
  - †Pterocephalia bridgei
- †Pteroconus
  - †Pteroconus gracilis
- †Pugnoides
  - †Pugnoides quinqeuplecis
  - †Pugnoides quinqueplecis
- †Pulsia
  - †Pulsia delira

== R ==
- †Rawlinsella
- †Renalcis
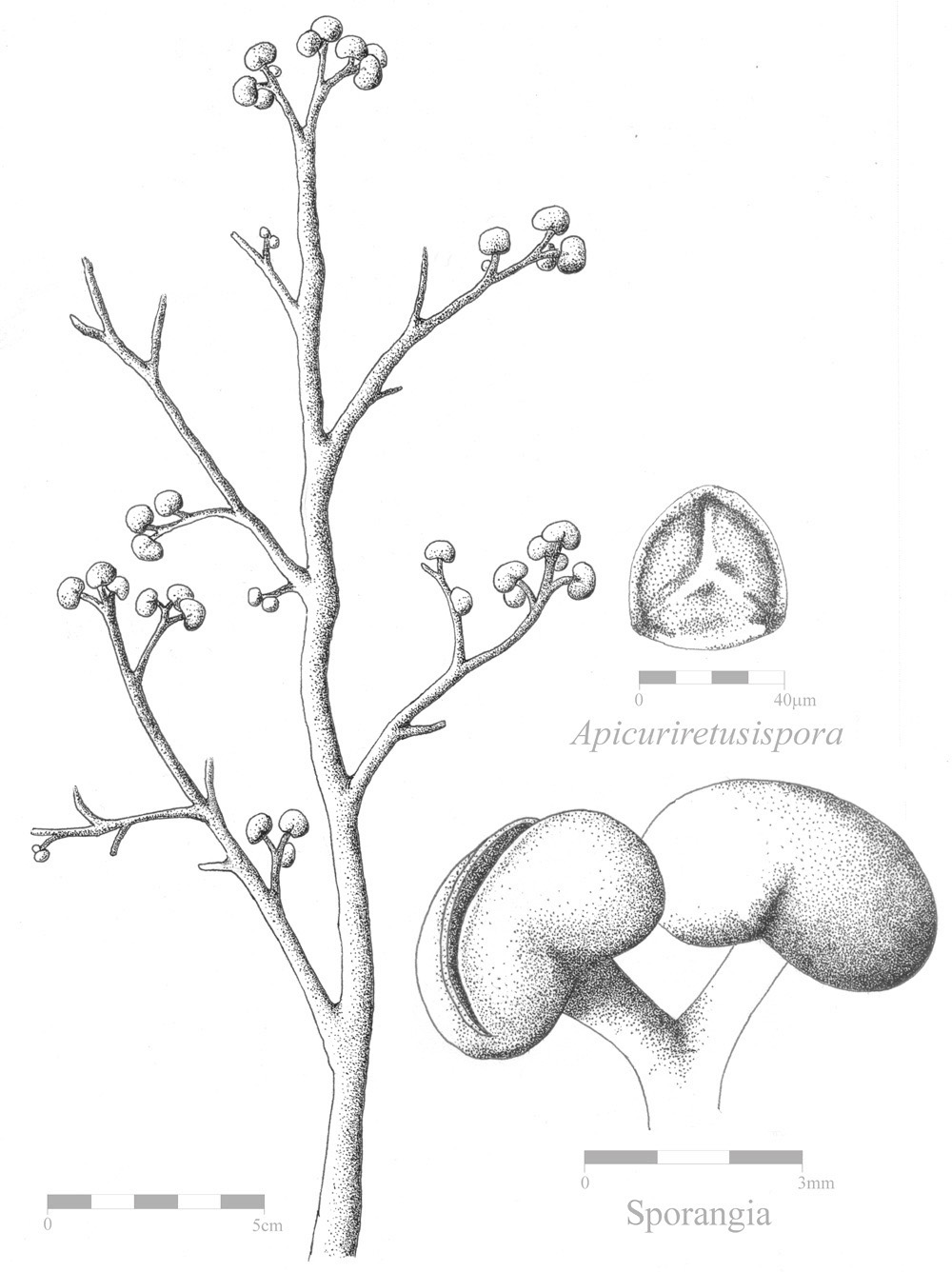
- Restoration of the Early Devonian primitive vascular plant Renalia
  †Renalia
  - †Renalia dorfii – type locality for species
- †Reticulariina
  - †Reticulariina browni
- †Reticulatia
  - †Reticulatia americana
- †Retispira
  - †Retispira fragilis
  - †Retispira modesta
  - †Retispira tenuilineata – or unidentified loosely related form
  - †Retispira textiliformis
- †Retusotriletes
  - †Retusotriletes actinomorphus
  - †Retusotriletes dubiosus
  - †Retusotriletes simplex
  - †Retusotriletes warringtonii
- †Rhynchotrema
  - †Rhynchotrema iowense
- †Rhynoleichus
  - †Rhynoleichus weeksi
- †Rugomena
  - †Rugomena planocorrugata

== S ==
- †Sallya
  - †Sallya linsa
- †Sanguinolites
- †Sansabella
  - †Sansabella reversa
- †Sargentina – tentative report
  - †Sargentina amsdenensis
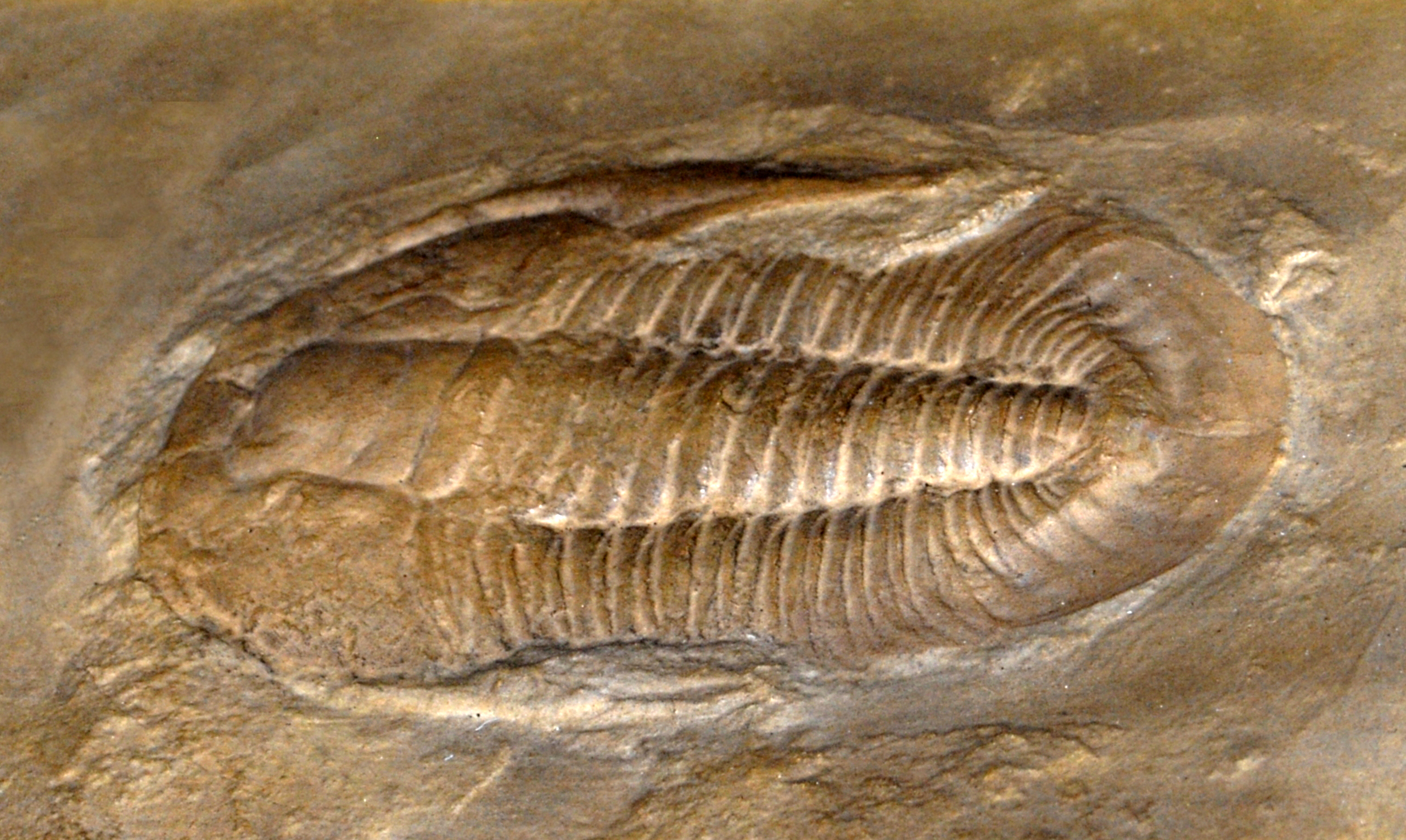
- Fossil of the Cambrian-Ordovician trilobite Saukiella
  †Saukiella
  - †Saukiella pyrene
- †Sawdonia
  - †Sawdonia wyomingense – type locality for species
- †Scapallina
  - †Scapallina phosphoriensis
- †Scaphellina
  - †Scaphellina concinna – type locality for species
- †Sceptropora
  - †Sceptropora facula – or unidentified comparable form
- †Schizodus
  - †Schizodus affinis – or unidentified related form
  - †Schizodus alpinus
  - †Schizodus altus – type locality for species
  - †Schizodus bifidus
  - †Schizodus canalis
  - †Schizodus depressus – or unidentified comparable form
  - †Schizodus ferrieri
  - †Schizodus subovatus
  - †Schizodus wheeleri – or unidentified comparable form
  - †Schizodus wyomingensis – type locality for species
- †Schizophoria
  - †Schizophoria depressa
  - †Schizophoria texana – or unidentified comparable form
- †Schuchertella
  - †Schuchertella poposiensis – or unidentified comparable form
- †Scoloconcha
  - †Scoloconcha globosa
- †Sedgewickia – tentative report
- †Semicircularea
  - †Semicircularea arcuata
- †Shansiella
- †Shedhornia – type locality for genus
  - †Shedhornia ornata – type locality for species
- †Shishaella
  - †Shishaella moreyi
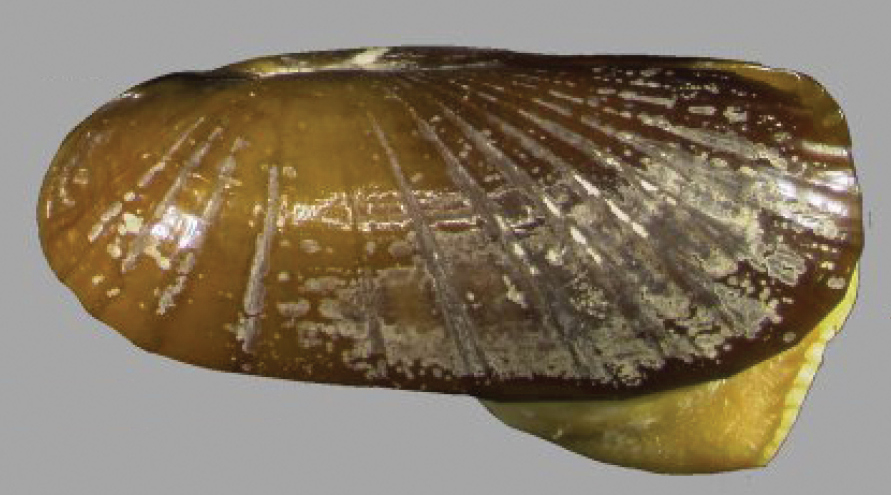
- Modern specimen of the marine bivalve Solemya
  Solemya
- †Soleniscus
  - †Soleniscus altonensis – or unidentified related form
  - †Soleniscus primogenius
  - †Soleniscus typicus
- †Solenochilus
  - †Solenochilus brammeri – or unidentified comparable form
- †Sphenalosia – type locality for genus
  - †Sphenalosia smedleyi – type locality for species
- †Sphenosteges
  - †Sphenosteges hispidus
- †Sphondylophyton
  - †Sphondylophyton hyenioides
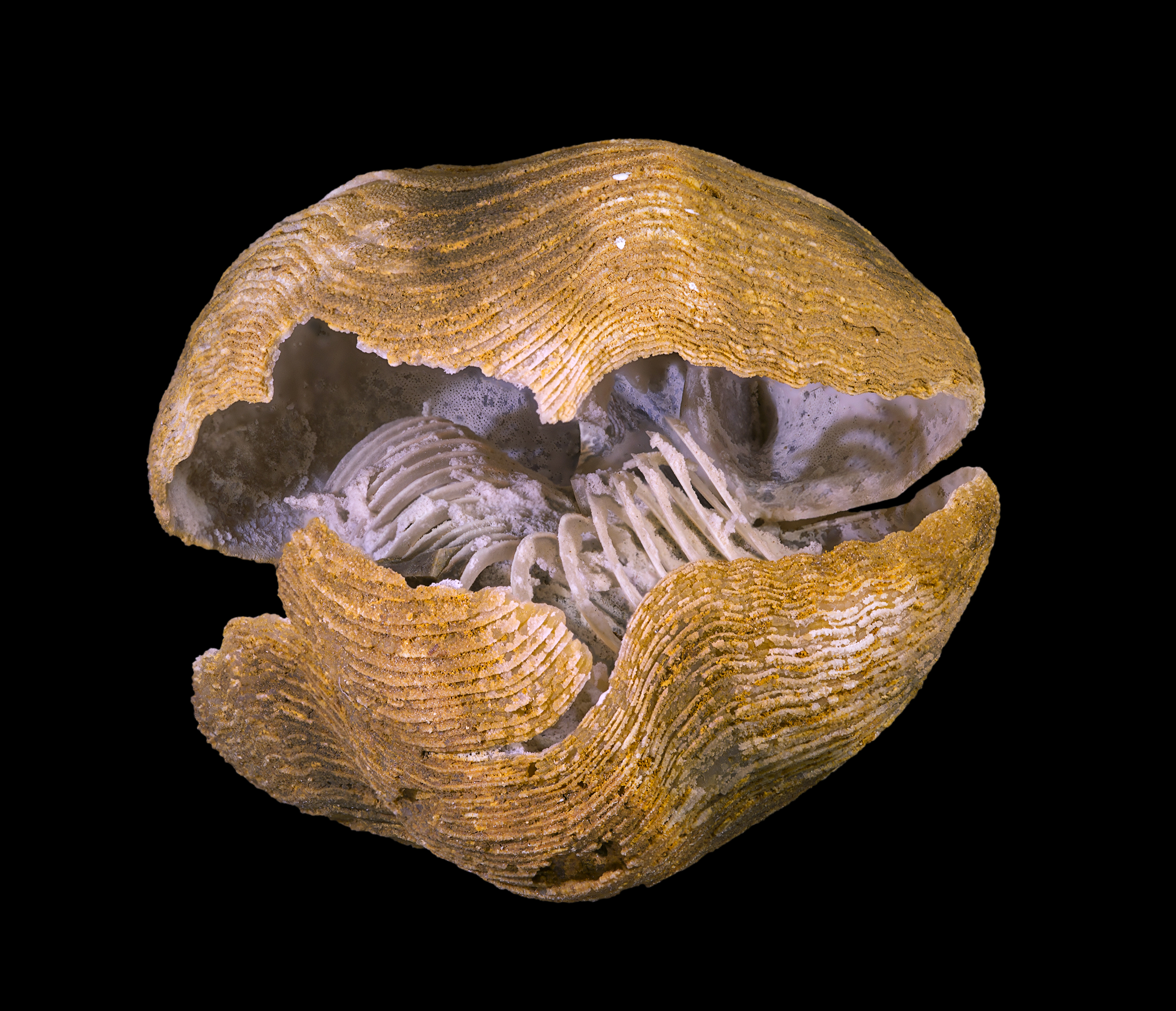
- Fossilized shell and lophophore of the Silurian-Middle Jurassic brachiopod Spiriferina
  †Spiriferina
  - †Spiriferina kentuckensis – or unidentified comparable form
- †Spyroceras
- †Stacheia
- †Stacheoides
- †Stearoceras
  - †Stearoceras phosphoriense
- †Stegocoelia
- †Stenolobulites
  - †Stenolobulites simulator
- †Stenopilus
  - †Stenopilus glaber
- †Stenopoceras
  - †Stenopoceras abundum – type locality for species
- †Steroconus
  - †Steroconus gracilis
  - †Steroconus plenus
  - †Steroconus robustus
- †Straparollus
- †Streblopteria
  - †Streblopteria montpelierensis
- †Streplopteria
- †Streptelasma
  - †Streptelasma trilobatum
- †Streptognathodus
  - †Streptognathodus parvus
- †Streptognathus
- †Strobeus
  - †Strobeus intercalaris – or unidentified comparable form
  - †Strobeus paludinaeformis – or unidentified comparable form
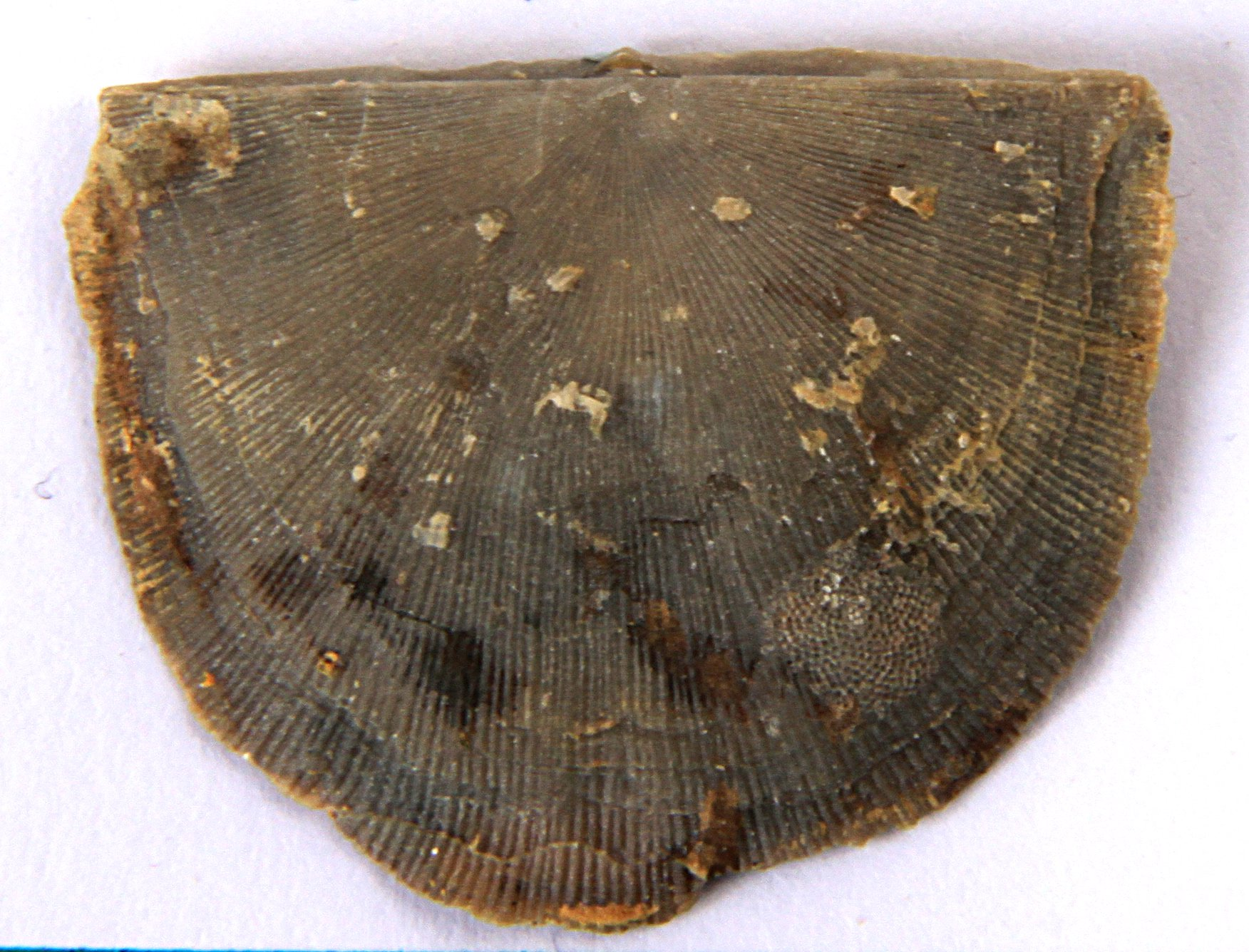
- Fossilized shell of the Ordovician-Silurian brachiopod Strophomena
  †Strophomena
- †Strophostylus
- †Stutchburia
- †Syspacheilus

== T ==
- †Taenicephalus
  - †Taenicephalus shumardi
- †Tainoceras
  - †Tainoceras wyomingense – type locality for species
- †Talbotina
- †Tapinotomaria – tentative report
- †Tatonkacystis – type locality for genus
  - †Tatonkacystis codyensis – type locality for species
- †Tetrataxis
- †Timaniella
  - †Timaniella pseudocamerata
- †Torynifer
  - †Torynifer setiger
- †Trachelocrinus
  - †Trachelocrinus resseri
- †Tracheolcrinas – tentative report
- †Trachydomia – tentative report
- †Trepeilopsis
- †Triarthropsis
  - †Triarthropsis nitida – or unidentified comparable form
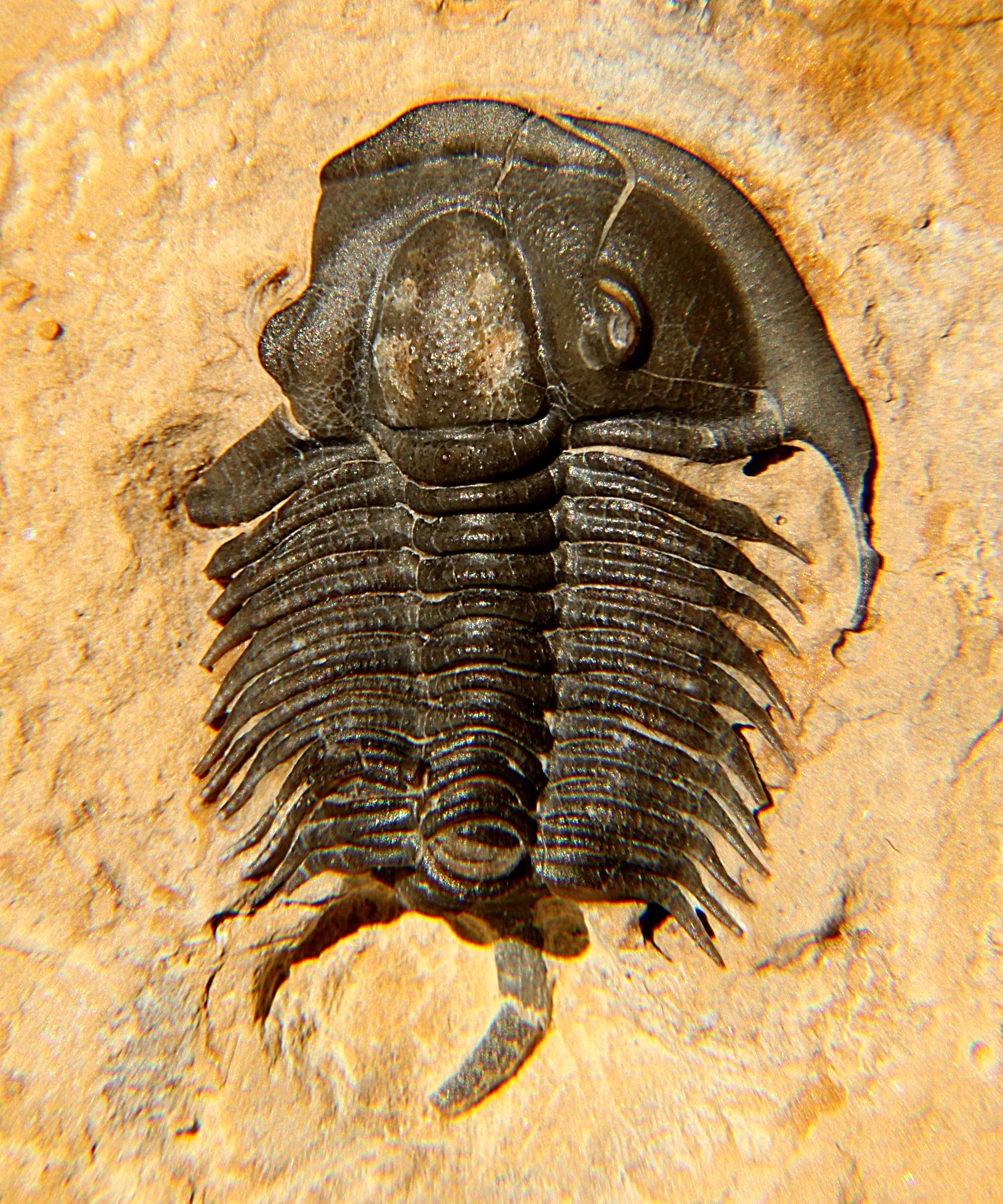
- Fossil of the Cambrian trilobite Tricrepicephalus
  †Tricrepicephalus
  - †Tricrepicephalus coria
- †Triticites
  - †Triticites ventricosus
- †Tuberitina
- †Turbinatocanina
- †Turbinatocaninia – tentative report

== U ==
- †Uncaspis
  - †Uncaspis limbata
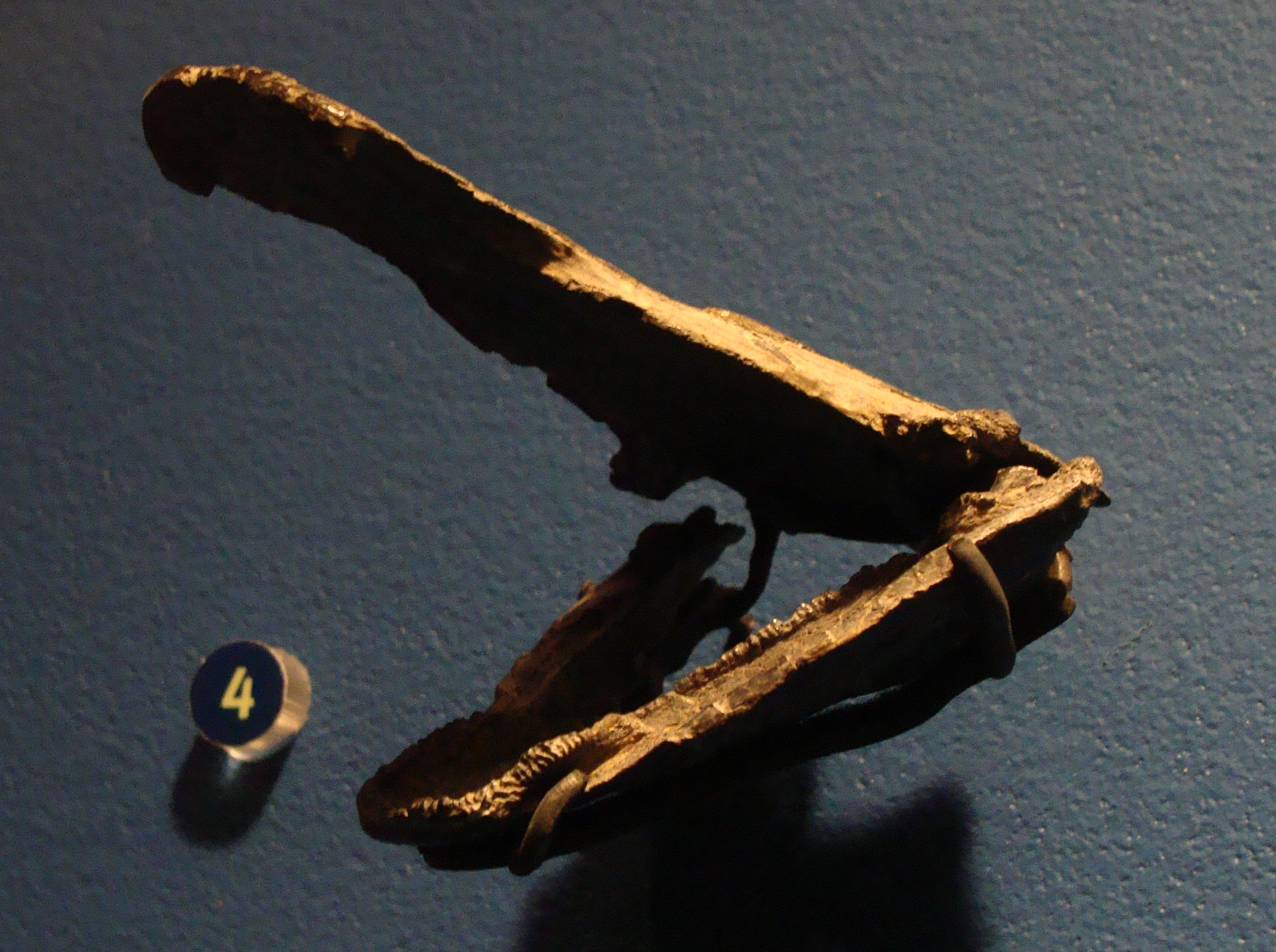
- Fossilized jaws of the Late Devonian lungfish Uranolophus
  †Uranolophus
  - †Uranolophus wyomingense

== V ==
- †Virgaspongiella – type locality for genus
  - †Virgaspongiella ramosa – type locality for species
- †Vnigripecten
  - †Vnigripecten phosphaticus – type locality for species
- †Volvotextularia

== W ==
- †Waagenella
  - †Waagenella crassus – or unidentified comparable form
- †Warthia
  - †Warthia fissus
  - †Warthia waageni – or unidentified comparable form
- †Wellerella
  - †Wellerella osagensis – or unidentified comparable form
- †Westonoceras
- †Whitfieldoceras
- †Wilkingia
  - †Wilkingia terminalis
  - †Wilkingia wyomingensis – type locality for species
- †Wilsonoceras
- †Winnipegoceras
- †Worthenia
  - †Worthenia corrugata

== X ==
- †Xestotrema
  - †Xestotrema pulchrum

== Y ==
- †Yakovlevia
  - †Yakovlevia multistriatus
- †Yochelsonellisa
  - †Yochelsonellisa eximia
- †Yunnania – tentative report

== Z ==
- †Zaphrentites – tentative report
- †Zellerina
  - †Zellerina discoidea
- †Zygospira
  - †Zygospira aequivalvis
