= Josina =

Josina is a feminine given name. Notable people with the name include:

- Josina Elder, member of American R&B and soul quartet For Real
- Josina Machel (1945–1971), Mozambican politician activist
- Josina Z. Machel (born 1976), Mozambican civil rights activist
- Josina Peixoto (1857–1911), 2nd first lady of Brazil
- Josina van Aerssen (1733–1797), Dutch composer and painter
- Josina Walburgis of Löwenstein-Rochefort (1615–1683), sovereign Princess Abbess of Thorn Abbey
