= Sphondylophyton =

Sphondylophyton Temporal range: Lower Devonian

Scientific classification
- Domain: Eukaryota
- Clade: Archaeplastida
- Division: Rhodophyta
- Genus: †Sphondylophyton; R.E.Schultes & Dorf
- Species: †S. hyenioides

Binomial name
- †Sphondylophyton hyenioides R.E.Schultes & Dorf

Sphondylophyton is an early Devonian fossil that was originally interpreted as the oldest sphenopsid, but has since been reinterpreted as a possible red alga
